= List of poor law unions in Dorset =

The Poor Law Amendment Act 1834 and its administration entailed the creation of entirely new administrative areas throughout the United Kingdom: groups of parishes known as Poor Law Unions or simply Unions.

(Parish here = civil parish, defined as "area[s] for which a poor rate is or can be assessed" in mid-19th century legislation, as for example the Poor Law Amendment Act 1866; the thing is of course older than the term.)

These groupings were based on geographical and demographic practicalities and took little account of most previous administrative arrangements, even cutting across county boundaries if necessary. By doing so, they were created new Poor Law Counties, so called, in regard to the Poor Law itself, and other administrative functions, such as the decennial census, which used the Union boundaries. Note below, for example, Bourton and Silton, which although in Dorset, were for decades in the Wiltshire Union of Mere, and thus the Poor Law County of Wiltshire; the Somerset parishes in Sherborne Union, and thus in the Poor Law County of Dorset; and Lyme Regis, in Axminster Union and the Poor Law County of Devon.

In Dorset, however, the 1834 Unions were closely related to the pre-existing divisions (a unit developed principally for tax purposes), updated as recently as 1830 in a local Act of Parliament. See List of divisions in Dorset.

The Unions once established were used as the basis for subsequent administrative changes: they were taken from 1837 as the civil registration districts, and also as the basis for the sanitary districts introduced in the 1870s (see List of sanitary districts in Dorset).

== Unions in Dorset and the civil parishes contained in each ==
=== Beaminster Union ===
- Dorset:
  - Beaminster, Bettiscombe, Broadwindsor, Burstock
  - Chedington, Corscombe
  - East Chelborough, Evershot
  - Halstock, Hooke
  - Mapperton, Marshwood, Melbury Osmond, Melbury Sampford, Mosterton
  - Netherbury, North Poorton
  - Pilsdon, Powerstock
  - Rampisham
  - South Perrott, Stoke Abbott
  - West Chelborough, Wraxall
- Somerset:
  - Misterton (transferred to Chard PLU 1896)
  - Seaborough (transferred to Dorset 1895)
- Devon:
  - Thorncombe (transferred from Axminster PLU 1894; transferred to Devon 1844 and back to Dorset 1896)

=== Blandford Union ===
  - Almer (transferred to Wimborne PLU 1894), Anderson
  - Blandford Forum, Blandford St Mary, Bryanston
  - Charlton Marshall
  - Durweston
  - Hilton
  - Iwerne Courtney, Iwerne Stepleton
  - Langton Long Blandford
  - Milborne St Andrew, Milborne Stileham, Milton Abbas
  - Pimperne
  - Spetisbury, Stourpaine
  - Tarrant Crawford, Tarrant Gunville, Tarrant Hinton, Tarrant Keyneston, Tarrant Launceston, Tarrant Monkton, Tarrant Rawston, Tarrant Rushton, Turnworth
  - Winterborne Clenston, Winterborne Houghton, Winterborne Kingston, Winterborne Stickland, Winterborne Tomson, Winterborne Whitchurch, Winterborne Zelston

Later Additions:

Chettle (transferred from Wimborne PLU 1894); Farnham (transferred from Wimborne PLU 1894)

=== Bridport Union ===
  - Allington, Askerswell
  - Bothenhampton, Bradpole, Bridport, Burton Bradstock
  - Catherston Leweston, Chideock, Chilcombe
  - Litton Cheney, Loders
  - Puncknowle
  - Shipton Gorge, Stanton St Gabriel, Swyre, Symondsbury
  - Walditch, Whitchurch Canonicorum, Wootton Fitzpaine

Later Additions:

Charmouth (transferred from Axminster PLU 1896)

=== Cerne Union ===
  - Alton Pancras
  - Batcombe, Buckland Newton
  - Cattistock, Cerne Abbas, Cheselbourne, West Compton
  - Frome St Quintin
  - Glanvilles Wootton, Godmanstone, Gorewood
  - Hermitage, Hilfield
  - Mappowder, Melbury Bubb, Melcombe Horsey, Minterne Magna
  - Nether Cerne
  - Piddletrenthide, Pulham
  - Sydling St Nicholas
  - Up Cerne

Cranborne, see Wimborne

=== Dorchester Union ===
  - Athelhampton
  - Bradford Peverell, Broadmayne, Burleston
  - Charminster, Chilfrome, Compton Valence
  - Dewlish, Dorchester (All Saints, Holy Trinity, St Peter)
  - Fordington, Frampton, Frome Vauchurch
  - Kingston Russell
  - Littlebredy, Long Bredy
  - Maiden Newton
  - Piddlehinton, Puddletown
  - Stinsford, Stratton
  - Tincleton, Toller Fratrum, Toller Porcorum, Tolpuddle
  - Warmwell, West Knighton, West Stafford, Whitcombe, Winterborne Came, Winterborne Herringston, Winterborne Monkton, Winterborne St Martin, Winterbourne Abbas, Winterbourne Steepleton, Woodsford, Wynford Eagle

Later Additions:

Watercombe (from 1862)

=== Poole Union ===
  - Canford Magna
  - Hamworthy
  - Kinson
  - Longfleet, Lytchett Matravers, Lytchett Minster
  - Parkstone, Poole (Poole St James)

Later Additions:

Branksome (from 1894)

Purbeck, see Wareham

=== Shaftesbury Union ===
  - Ashmore
  - Cann, Compton Abbas
  - East Orchard, East Stour
  - Fontmell Magna
  - Gillingham
  - Iwerne Minster
  - Margaret Marsh, Melbury Abbas, Motcombe
  - Shaftesbury (Holy Trinity, St James, St Peter), Stour Provost, Sutton Waldron
  - Todber
  - West Orchard, West Stour

Later Additions (all in 1894):

Alcester (created from Shaftesbury); Bourton and Silton (transferred from Mere PLU); Buckhorn Weston and Kington Magna (transferred from Wincanton PLU)

=== Sherborne Union ===
- Dorset:
  - Beer Hackett, Bishops Caundle, Bradford Abbas
  - Castleton, Caundle Marsh, Chetnole, Clifton Maybank
  - Folke
  - Haydon, Holnest
  - Leigh, Leweston, Lillington, Longburton
  - Nether Compton, North Wootton
  - Oborne, Over Compton
  - Purse Caundle
  - Ryme Intrinseca
  - Sherborne, Stockwood
  - Thornford
  - Yetminster
- Somerset:
  - Holwell (transferred to Dorset 1844)
  - Goathill, Poyntington, Sandford Orcas, Trent (all transferred to Dorset 1895)
  - Marston Magna (transferred to Yeovil PLU 1894)
  - Rimpton (transferred to Yeovil PLU 1896)

=== Sturminster Union ===
  - Belchalwell (divided between Fifehead Neville and Okeford Fitzpaine 1884)
  - Child Okeford
  - Fifehead Magdalen, Fifehead Neville
  - Hammoon, Hazelbury Bryan, Hinton St Mary
  - Ibberton
  - Lydlinch
  - Manston, Marnhull
  - Okeford Fitzpaine
  - Shillingstone, Stalbridge, Stock Gaylard, Stoke Wake, Stourton Caundle, Sturminster Newton
  - Woolland

Later Addition:

Hanford (from 1858)

=== Wareham & Purbeck Union ===
Separate Poor Law Unions for Wareham and for Purbeck were formed 25 March 1836, but were merged into a single Wareham & Purbeck Union in September 1836.

- The original Wareham Union
  - Affpuddle, Arne
  - Bere Regis, Bloxworth
  - Chaldon Herring, Coombe Keynes
  - East Holme, East Lulworth, East Stoke
  - Morden, Moreton
  - Turners Puddle
  - Wareham (Holy Trinity, Lady St Mary, St Martin), West Lulworth, Winfrith Newburgh, Wool
- The original Purbeck Union
  - Church Knowle, Corfe Castle
  - Kimmeridge
  - Langton Matravers
  - Steeple, Studland, Swanage
  - Tyneham
  - Worth Matravers

=== Weymouth Union ===
  - Abbotsbury
  - Bincombe, Broadwey, Buckland Ripers
  - Fleet
  - Langton Herring
  - Melcombe Regis
  - Osmington, Owermoigne
  - Portesham, Portland, Preston, Poxwell
  - Radipole
  - Upwey
  - West Chickerell, Weymouth, Wyke Regis

=== Wimborne & Cranborne Union ===
Separate Poor Law Unions for Wimborne and for Cranborne were formed on 28 September and 30 September 1835 respectively, but were merged into a single Wimborne & Cranborne Union in October 1836.

- The original Wimborne Union
  - Chalbury, Corfe Mullen
  - Hampreston, Hinton Martell, Hinton Parva
  - Shapwick, Sturminster Marshall
  - West Parley, Wimborne Minster, Witchampton
- The original Cranborne Union
  - Chettle (moved to Blandford PLU 1894), Cranborne
  - Edmondsham
  - Farnham (moved to Blandford PLU 1894)
  - Gussage All Saints, Gussage St Michael
  - Horton
  - Long Crichel
  - Moor Crichel
  - Pentridge
  - Sixpenny Handley
  - Tollard Royal
  - Wimborne St Giles, Woodlands

Later additions:

East Woodyates and West Woodyates (created 1858)
Almer (transferred from Blandford PLU 1894)
Alderholt and Verwood (created from Cranborne 1894)
Holt and Pamphill (created from Wimborne Minster from 1894)
Colehill (created from Holt 1896)

== Unions in other Poor Law counties containing Dorset civil parishes ==
=== Axminster Union ===
(in Devon)

  - Chardstock
  - Charmouth (1836–94)
  - Hawkchurch
  - Lyme Regis
  - Thorncombe (1836–94)

=== Chard Union ===
(in Somerset)

  - Wambrook

=== Mere Union ===
(in Wiltshire)

  - Bourton (1835–94)
  - Silton (1835–94)

=== Wincanton Union ===
(in Somerset)

  - Buckhorn Weston (1835–94)
  - Kington Magna (1835–94)

== References and sources ==
- Boswell, Edward, 1833: The Civil Division of the County of Dorset (published on CD by Archive CD Books Ltd, 1992)
- Hutchins, John, History of Dorset, vols 1-4 (3rd ed 1861-70; reprinted by EP Publishing, Wakefield, 1973)
- Mills, A. D., 1977, 1980, 1989: Place Names of Dorset, parts 1-3. English Place Name Society: Survey of English Place Names vols LII, LIII and 59/60
