= List of sanitary districts in Dorset =

Under the Public Health Acts 1873 and 1875 the Poor Law Unions were used as the basis for sanitary districts. All municipal boroughs and areas with bodies such as improvement commissioners became Urban Sanitary Districts. (Any area which acquired borough or urban status after the Act also became at that point an Urban Sanitary District). The remaining areas of the country - i.e., the Unions minus the urban areas - became Rural Sanitary Districts.

Under the Local Government Act 1894 the Urban and Rural Sanitary Districts in Dorset were succeeded by Urban Districts and Rural Districts.

== Sanitary districts in Dorset between 1875 and 1894 ==
- RSD - Rural Sanitary District
- USD - Urban Sanitary District

=== Axminster RSD ===
In Devon but also covered the following parishes, then in Dorset:

- Chardstock
- Hawkchurch

=== Beaminster RSD ===
Dorset:

- Beaminster, Bettiscombe, Broadwindsor, Burstock
- Chedington, Corscombe
- East Chelborough, Evershot
- Halstock, Hooke
- Mapperton, Marshwood, Melbury Osmond, Melbury Sampford, Mosterton
- Netherbury, North Poorton
- Pilsdon, Powerstock
- Rampisham
- South Perrott, Stoke Abbott
- West Chelborough, Wraxall

Somerset:

- Misterton
- Seaborough

=== Blandford RSD ===
- Almer, Anderson
- Blandford Forum, Blandford St Mary, Bryanston (parts only)
- Charlton Marshall
- Durweston
- Hilton
- Iwerne Courtney, Iwerne Stepleton
- Langton Long Blandford
- Milborne St Andrew, Milborne Stileham, Milton Abbas
- Pimperne
- Spetisbury, Stourpaine
- Tarrant Crawford, Tarrant Gunville, Tarrant Hinton, Tarrant Keyneston, Tarrant Launceston, Tarrant Monkton, Tarrant Rawston, Tarrant Rushton, Turnworth
- Winterborne Clenston, Winterborne Houghton, Winterborne Kingston, Winterborne Stickland, Winterborne Tomson, Winterborne Whitchurch, Winterborne Zelston

=== Blandford Forum USD ===
- parts of Blandford Forum, Blandford St Mary and Bryanston

=== Bridport RSD ===
- Allington (part), Askerswell
- parts of Bothenhampton, Bradpole and Burton Bradstock
- Catherston Leweston, Chideock, Chilcombe
- Litton Cheney, Loders
- Puncknowle
- Shipton Gorge, Stanton St Gabriel, Swyre, Symondsbury (part)
- Walditch (part), Whitchurch Canonicorum, Wootton Fitzpaine

=== Bridport USD ===
- Bridport
- parts of Allington, Bothenhampton, Bradpole, Burton Bradstock, Symondsbury and Walditch

=== Cerne RSD ===
- Alton Pancras
- Batcombe, Buckland Newton
- Cattistock, Cerne Abbas, Cheselbourne, West Compton
- Frome St Quintin
- Glanvilles Wootton, Godmanstone, Gorewood
- Hermitage, Hilfield
- Mappowder, Melbury Bubb, Melcombe Horsey, Minterne Magna
- Nether Cerne
- Piddletrenthide, Pulham
- Sydling St Nicholas
- Up Cerne

=== Chard RSD ===
In Somerset but also covered the following parish, at that time in Dorset:

- Wambrook

=== Dorchester RSD ===
- Athelhampton
- Bradford Peverell, Broadmayne, Burleston
- Charminster, Chilfrome, Compton Valence
- Dewlish, Dorchester (Holy Trinity) (part)
- Fordington (part), Frampton, Frome Vauchurch
- Kingston Russell
- Littlebredy, Long Bredy
- Maiden Newton
- Piddlehinton, Puddletown
- Stinsford, Stratton
- Tincleton, Toller Fratrum, Toller Porcorum, Tolpuddle
- Warmwell, Watercombe, West Knighton, West Stafford, Whitcombe, Winterborne Came, Winterborne Herringston, Winterborne Monkton, Winterborne St Martin, Winterbourne Abbas, Winterbourne Steepleton, Woodsford, Wynford Eagle

=== Dorchester USD ===
- Dorchester (All Saints, St Peter; part of Holy Trinity)
- part of Fordington

=== Kinson USD ===
- part of Kinson (1892–94)

=== Lyme Regis USD ===
- Lyme Regis

=== Mere RSD ===
In Wiltshire but also covered the following Dorset parishes:

- Bourton; Silton

=== Poole RSD ===
- Canford Magna
- Kinson (entire to 1892; part from 1892 to 1894)
- Lytchett Matravers, Lytchett Minster

=== Poole USD ===
- Hamworthy
- Longfleet
- Parkstone, Poole (Poole St James)

=== Portland USD ===
- Portland

=== Shaftesbury RSD ===
- Ashmore
- Cann, Compton Abbas
- East Orchard, East Stour
- Fontmell Magna
- Gillingham
- Iwerne Minster
- Margaret Marsh, Melbury Abbas, Motcombe
- parts of Shaftesbury (Holy Trinity, St James, St Peter); Stour Provost, Sutton Waldron
- Todber
- West Orchard, West Stour

=== Shaftesbury USD ===
- parts of Shaftesbury (Holy Trinity, St James, St Peter)

=== Sherborne RSD ===
Dorset:

- Beer Hackett, Bishops Caundle, Bradford Abbas
- Castleton (part), Caundle Marsh, Chetnole, Clifton Maybank
- Folke
- Haydon, Holnest, Holwell
- Leigh, Leweston, Lillington, Longburton
- Nether Compton, North Wootton
- Oborne, Over Compton
- Purse Caundle
- Ryme Intrinseca
- Sherborne (part), Stockwood
- Thornford
- Yetminster

Somerset:

- Goathill, Marston Magna, Poyntington, Rimpton, Sandford Orcas, Trent

=== Sherborne USD ===
- part of Castleton
- part of Sherborne

=== Sturminster RSD ===
- Belchalwell (divided between Fifehead Neville and Okeford Fitzpaine 1884)
- Child Okeford
- Fifehead Magdalen, Fifehead Neville
- Hammoon, Hanford, Hazelbury Bryan, Hinton St Mary
- Ibberton
- Lydlinch
- Manston, Marnhull
- Okeford Fitzpaine
- Shillingstone, Stalbridge, Stock Gaylard, Stoke Wake, Stourton Caundle, Sturminster Newton
- Woolland

=== Swanage USD ===
- Swanage

=== Wareham and Purbeck RSD ===
- Affpuddle, Arne
- Bere Regis, Bloxworth
- Chaldon Herring, Church Knowle, Coombe Keynes, Corfe Castle
- East Holme, East Lulworth, East Stoke
- Kimmeridge
- Langton Matravers
- Morden, Moreton
- Steeple, Studland
- Turners Puddle, Tyneham
- Wareham (Holy Trinity and St Martin - part; Lady St Mary - part 1875-86; entire 1886-94), West Lulworth, Winfrith Newburgh, Wool, Worth Matravers

=== Wareham USD ===
- Wareham Holy Trinity (part); Lady St Mary (part 1875-86; entire 1886-94); St Martin (part)

=== Weymouth RSD ===
- Abbotsbury
- Bincombe, Broadwey, Buckland Ripers
- Fleet
- Langton Herring
- Osmington, Owermoigne
- Portesham, Preston, Poxwell
- Radipole (part)
- Upwey
- West Chickerell, Wyke Regis (part)

=== Weymouth and Melcombe Regis USD ===
- Melcombe Regis
- Radipole (part)
- Weymouth, Wyke Regis (part)

=== Wimborne and Cranborne RSD ===
- Chalbury, Chettle, Corfe Mullen, Cranborne
- East Woodyates, Edmondsham
- Farnham (moved to Blandford PLU 1894)
- Gussage All Saints, Gussage St Michael
- Hampreston, Hinton Martell, Hinton ParvaHorton
- Long Crichel
- Moor Crichel
- Pentridge
- Shapwick, Sixpenny Handley, Sturminster Marshall
- Tollard Royal
- West Parley, West Woodyates, Wimborne Minster (entire to 1892; part from 1892 to 1894), Wimborne St Giles, Witchampton, Woodlands

=== Wimborne Minster USD ===
- part of Wimborne Minster (1892–94)

=== Wincanton RSD ===
In Somerset but covered the following Dorset parishes:

- Buckhorn Weston; Kington Magna
