= North Dorset (district) =

Former non-metropolitan district in England

North Dorset District
- Non-metropolitan district
- North Dorset shown within Dorset
- Coordinates: 50.86°N 2.17°E
- Sovereign state: United Kingdom
- Constituent country: England
- Region: South West England
- Non-metropolitan county: Dorset
- Status: Abolished
- Admin HQ: Blandford Forum
- Incorporated: 1 April 1974 to 31 March 2019

Government
  - Type: Non-metropolitan district council
  - Body: North Dorset District Council
  - Leadership: Leader and Cabinet ( )

Area
  - Total: 235.2 sq mi (609.2 km^{2})

Population (mid-2018)
  - Total: 71,100
  - Density: 302/sq mi (117/km^{2})
  - Ethnicity: 98.6% White
- Time zone: UTC0
  - Summer (DST): UTC+1 (BST)
- ONS code: 19UE (ONS); E07000050 (GSS)
- OS grid reference: ST8806

North Dorset was a local government district in Dorset, England, between 1974 and 2019. Its area was largely rural, but included the towns of Blandford Forum, Gillingham, Shaftesbury, Stalbridge and Sturminster Newton. Much of North Dorset was in the River Stour valley, known as the Blackmore Vale. The economy of North Dorset was largely based on dairy agriculture.

The district was formed on 1 April 1974, under the Local Government Act 1972, from the municipal boroughs of Blandford Forum, Shaftesbury, Blandford Rural District, Shaftesbury Rural District and Sturminster Rural District. The district and its council were abolished on 1 April 2019 and, together with the other four Dorset districts outside the greater Bournemouth area, incorporated into a Dorset unitary authority.

At the 2001 UK census North Dorset had a population of 61,905, a rise of 8,300 from 1991, with 25,248 households.

North Dorset is home to North Dorset Rugby Football Club.

== District Council ==
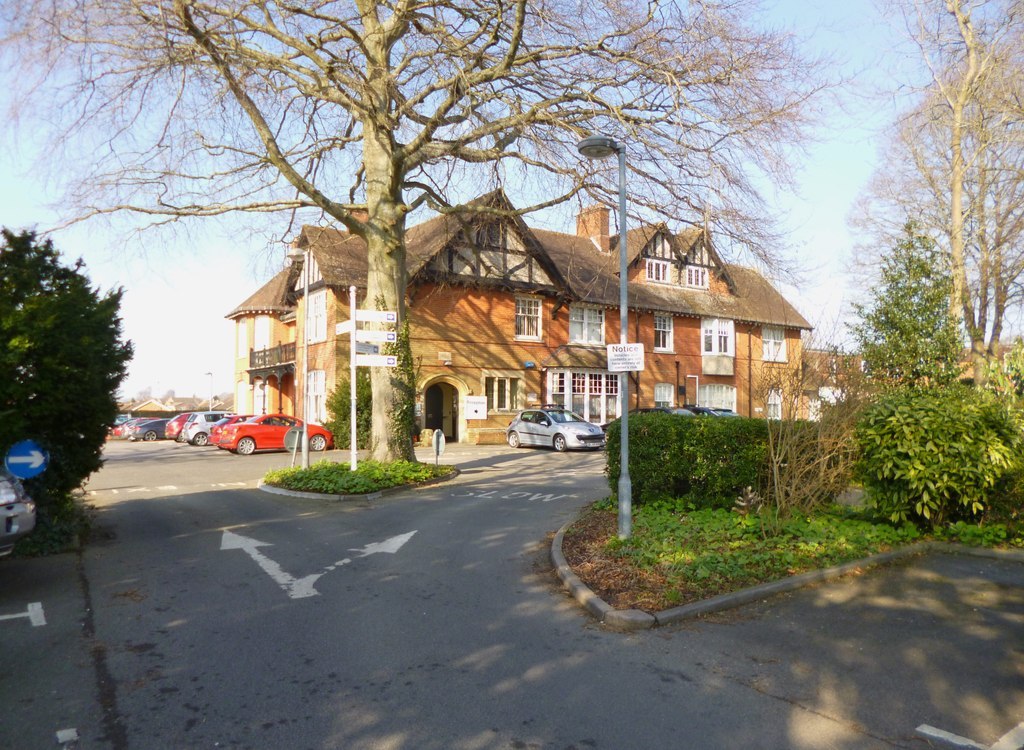
Nordon, Salisbury Road, Blandford Forum: Council's headquarters, since demolished

North Dorset District Council had its main offices at a large converted house called Nordon on Salisbury Road, Blandford Forum, which had previously been the offices of the Blandford Rural District Council, one of the council's predecessors. Councillors were elected every four years; the final election before abolition was held in 2015.

== Settlements ==
Towns with a population over 2,500 are in bold.

- Anderson, Ashmore
- Belchalwell, **Blandford Forum**, Bourton, Bryanston, Buckhorn Weston
- Cann, Charlton Marshall, Chettle, Child Okeford, Compton Abbas
- Durweston
- East Orchard, East Stour
- Farnham, Fifehead Magdalen, Fifehead Neville, Fontmell Magna
- **Gillingham**, Glanvilles Wootton
- Hammoon, Hazelbury Bryan, Hilton, Hinton St Mary
- Ibberton, Iwerne Courtney, Iwerne Minster
- Kington Magna
- Langton Long Blandford, Lydlinch
- Manston, Mappowder, Margaret Marsh, Marnhull, Melbury Abbas, Milborne St Andrew, Milton Abbas, Motcombe
- Okeford Fitzpaine
- Pimperne, Pulham
- **Shaftesbury**, Shillingstone, Silton, Spetisbury, **Stalbridge**, Stoke Wake, Stourpaine, Stour Provost, Stourton Caundle, Stour Row, **Sturminster Newton**, Sutton Waldron
- Tarrant Crawford, Tarrant Gunville, Tarrant Hinton, Tarrant Keyneston, Tarrant Launceston, Tarrant Monkton, Tarrant Rawston, Tarrant Rushton, Todber, Turnworth
- West Orchard, West Stour, Winterborne Clenston, Winterborne Houghton, Winterborne Kingston, Winterborne Stickland, Winterborne Whitechurch, Winterborne Zelston, Woolland

== See also ==
- Grade II* listed buildings in North Dorset
- List of churches in North Dorset
