= Grade II* listed buildings in North Dorset =

North Dorset shown in Dorset

There are over 20,000 Grade II* listed buildings in England. This is a list of these buildings in the former district of North Dorset in the county of Dorset.

== North Dorset ==
Name	Location	Type	Completed (Note: The date given is the date used by Historic England as significant for the initial building or that of an important part in the structure's description.)	Date designated	Grid ref. (Note: The grid reference is based on the British national grid reference system, sometimes known as OSGB36, used by the Ordnance Survey.) Geo-coordinates	Entry number (Note: The "List Entry Number" is a unique number assigned to each listed building and scheduled monument by Historic England.)	Image
Tomson Farmhouse	Winterborne Tomson, Anderson	Farmhouse	Early 17th century	14 July 1955	SY8856897403; 50°46′34″N 2°09′49″W	1324258	Tomson Farmhouse More images
Dale House	Blandford Forum	Detached house	c. 1690–1700	27 October 1950	ST8856106639; 50°51′33″N 2°09′50″W	1153057	Dale House More images
Eastway House	Blandford Forum	House	Possibly after 1731	27 October 1950	ST8879406373; 50°51′24″N 2°09′38″W	1108704	Eastway House More images
Lime Tree House	Blandford Forum	House	Early to mid-18th century	27 October 1950	ST8850806407; 50°51′25″N 2°09′53″W	1108653	Lime Tree House More images
Lyston House	Blandford Forum	House	Probably post-1731 to mid-18th century	27 October 1950	ST8868606350; 50°51′24″N 2°09′44″W	1108679	Lyston House More images
Ryves Almshouses	Blandford Forum	Almshouse	1682	27 October 1950	ST8853006518; 50°51′29″N 2°09′52″W	1108628	Ryves Almshouses More images
1 Market Place	Blandford Forum	House	Post-1731	27 October 1950	ST8842906291; 50°51′22″N 2°09′57″W	1108683	1 Market Place More images
9 Market Place	Blandford Forum	House	Probably late 18th century	27 October 1950	ST8845506307; 50°51′22″N 2°09′55″W	1304602	9 Market Place More images
Church of St Mary	Lower Blandford St Mary, Blandford St Mary	Anglican parish church	14th century tower	14 July 1955	ST8916805271; 50°50′49″N 2°09′19″W	1110176	Church of St Mary More images
The Manor House	Lower Blandford St Mary, Blandford St. Mary	Manor house	Early 17th century	14 July 1955	ST8909205536; 50°50′57″N 2°09′23″W	1171679	The Manor House
Church of St John	Buckhorn Weston	Anglican parish church	14th-century origin	3 January 1985	ST7569024717; 51°01′17″N 2°20′53″W	1324559	Church of St John More images
Church of St Mary	Chettle	Anglican parish church	Early 16th-century tower	14 July 1955	ST9515813283; 50°55′08″N 2°04′13″W	1324295	Church of St Mary More images
Church of St Nicholas	Child Okeford	Anglican parish church	Late 15th or early 16th-century tower	4 October 1960	ST8355312750; 50°54′50″N 2°14′07″W	1110263	Church of St Nicholas More images
Fontmell Parva House	Fontmell Parva, Child Okeford	House	c. 1665	12 October 1978	ST8269014550; 50°55′48″N 2°14′52″W	1324593	Fontmell Parva House More images
Church of St Nicholas	Durweston	Anglican parish church	15th-century tower	14 July 1955	ST8587308523; 50°52′34″N 2°12′08″W	1110271	Church of St Nicholas More images
Durweston Bridge	Durweston	Road bridge	1795	14 July 1955	ST8635808628; 50°52′37″N 2°11′43″W	1110240	Durweston Bridge More images
Church of St Lawrence	Farnham	Anglican parish church	Probably 12th-century origin	14 July 1955	ST9578315050; 50°56′06″N 2°03′41″W	1172411	Church of St Lawrence More images
Church of All Saints	Fifehead Neville	Anglican parish church	c. 1500	4 October 1960	ST7679911001; 50°53′53″N 2°19′53″W	1324503	Church of All Saints More images
Footbridge over the River Divelish	Fifehead Neville	Packhorse bridge	Medieval	4 October 1960	ST7718911146; 50°53′58″N 2°19′33″W	1110485	Footbridge over the River Divelish More images
Church of St Andrew	Fontmell Magna	Anglican parish church	15th-century origin	16 August 1960	ST8654016985; 50°57′08″N 2°11′35″W	1305380	Church of St Andrew More images
Parish Church of St Mary	Glanvilles Wootton	Anglican parish church	South chapel c. 1344	4 October 1960	ST6802508155; 50°52′19″N 2°27′21″W	1110491	Parish Church of St Mary More images
Round Chimneys Farmhouse	Glanvilles Wootton	House	c. 1590s	4 October 1960	ST6819009457; 50°53′01″N 2°27′13″W	1324467	Round Chimneys Farmhouse More images
Manor House	Hammoon	Manor house	16th century	4 October 1960	ST8173614612; 50°55′50″N 2°15′41″W	1110215	Manor House More images
Church of St Michael and All Angels	Hanford	Anglican parish church	17th century	4 October 1960	ST8456411178; 50°54′00″N 2°13′15″W	1110147	Church of St Michael and All Angels More images
Hanford School	Hanford	Country house	1623	14 October 1960	ST8448011111; 50°53′57″N 2°13′19″W	1110146	Hanford School More images
Church of St Peter	Hinton St Mary	Anglican parish church	15th-century tower	4 October 1960	ST7867816099; 50°56′38″N 2°18′18″W	1110423	Church of St Peter More images
Dalton's Farmhouse Including Front Garden Walls	Hinton St Mary	House	Early to mid-18th century	4 October 1960	ST7868716280; 50°56′44″N 2°18′17″W	1110428	Dalton's Farmhouse Including Front Garden Walls More images
Stable block 40m south of St Peter's Church	Hinton St Mary	Stable	Probably 16th century	4 October 1960	ST7869216049; 50°56′37″N 2°18′17″W	1324511	Upload Photo
The Manor House	Hinton St Mary	Manor house	Possibly 13th century	4 October 1960	ST7870316121; 50°56′39″N 2°18′16″W	1110420	The Manor House More images
Tithe Barn Approximately 100 Metres South of Hinton St Mary Manor House	Hinton St Mary	Tithe barn	Probably 15th century	4 October 1960	ST7872816032; 50°56′36″N 2°18′15″W	1110422	Upload Photo
Parish Church of St Eustace	Ibberton	Anglican parish church	15th century	4 October 1960	ST7893407562; 50°52′02″N 2°18′03″W	1287985	Parish Church of St Eustace More images
The Chantry	Iwerne Minster	House	17th century	16 August 1960	ST8679514414; 50°55′44″N 2°11′21″W	1172228	The Chantry
Church of St Mary	Iwerne Stepleton	Anglican parish church	11th century	14 July 1955	ST8628211246; 50°54′02″N 2°11′47″W	1324643	Upload Photo
Church of All Saints	Kington Magna	Anglican parish church	Late 15th-century tower	16 August 1960	ST7681423135; 51°00′26″N 2°19′55″W	1324579	Church of All Saints More images
Parish Church of St Thomas a Beckett	Lydlinch	Anglican parish church	15th-century tower	4 October 1960	ST7424013364; 50°55′09″N 2°22′04″W	1110465	Parish Church of St Thomas a Beckett More images
Stock Gaylard House	Stock Gaylard, Lydlinch	Country house	Late 18th century	4 October 1960	ST7220513007; 50°54′57″N 2°23′48″W	1324496	Stock Gaylard House More images
Mappowder Court	Mappowder	Country house	Mid-18th century	4 October 1960	ST7389105800; 50°51′04″N 2°22′20″W	1324499	Mappowder Court
Church of St Margaret	Margaret Marsh	Anglican parish church	15th-century tower	16 August 1960	ST8235218632; 50°58′01″N 2°15′10″W	1305445	Church of St Margaret More images
Chantry Farm	Marnhull	Farmhouse	17th century	4 October 1960	ST7713818189; 50°57′46″N 2°19′37″W	1110410	Chantry Farm More images
Senior's Farmhouse and Attached Barn	Marnhull	House	c. 1500	4 October 1960	ST7810218710; 50°58′03″N 2°18′48″W	1172057	Senior's Farmhouse and Attached Barn More images
Stable/dwelling Range Approximately 10 M South-west of Chantry Farm	Marnhull	Stable/dwelling	17th century	4 October 1960	ST7715018163; 50°57′45″N 2°19′36″W	1172053	Stable/dwelling Range Approximately 10 M South-west of Chantry Farm
Church of St Thomas	Melbury Abbas	Anglican parish church	1852	16 August 1960	ST8821020076; 50°58′48″N 2°10′10″W	1304933	Church of St Thomas More images
Parish Church of Saint Andrew	Milborne St Andrew	Anglican parish church	15th-century tower	14 July 1955	SY8011897401; 50°46′33″N 2°17′00″W	1118618	Parish Church of Saint Andrew More images
Almshouses and the Reading Room	Milton Abbas	Almshouse	1674, relocated in 1779	14 July 1955	ST8062501822; 50°48′56″N 2°16′35″W	1118594	Almshouses and the Reading Room More images
Delcombe Manor	Delcombe, Milton Abbas	Country house	c. 1750	14 July 1955	ST7929004846; 50°50′34″N 2°17′44″W	1324251	Upload Photo
Garden House, Delcombe Manor	Delcombe, Milton Abbas	House	c. 1750	14 July 1985	ST7931404812; 50°50′33″N 2°17′43″W	1151968	Upload Photo
Parish Church of St James	Milton Abbas	Anglican parish church	c. 1786	14 July 1955	ST8064801785; 50°48′55″N 2°16′34″W	1118560	Parish Church of St James More images
The Old Rectory	Milton Abbas	House	c. 1780	14 July 1955	ST8033501708; 50°48′52″N 2°16′50″W	1304949	The Old Rectory More images
The Stone Lodge, and the Gatehouse, with Gatepiers and Gates	Milton Abbas	Lodges	Probably c. 1775	2 August 1979	ST8057202958; 50°49′33″N 2°16′38″W	1151927	Upload Photo
Church of St Mary	Motcombe	Anglican parish church	1846	16 August 1960	ST8490925238; 51°01′35″N 2°13′00″W	1152195	Church of St Mary More images
North End Farmhouse	North End, Motcombe	Farmhouse	17th century	3 January 1985	ST8456827524; 51°02′49″N 2°13′17″W	1324606	Upload Photo
Church of St Aldhelm	Belchalwell, Okeford Fitzpaine	Anglican parish church	15th century	4 October 1960	ST7924709803; 50°53′14″N 2°17′47″W	1216309	Church of St Aldhelm More images
Parish Church of St Andrew	Greenhayes, Okeford Fitzpaine	Anglican parish church	15th century	4 September 1960	ST8073210816; 50°53′47″N 2°16′31″W	1216617	Parish Church of St Andrew More images
Church of St Peter	Pimperne	Anglican parish church	Mid 15th century	26 June 1953	ST9037009415; 50°53′03″N 2°08′18″W	1110839	Church of St Peter More images
Parish Church of St Thomas a Becket	Pulham	Anglican parish church	15th century	4 October 1960	ST7116908518; 50°52′32″N 2°24′40″W	1228063	Parish Church of St Thomas a Becket More images
The Old Rectory	Pulham	House	Late 18th century	7 June 1973	ST7121208465; 50°52′30″N 2°24′38″W	1228064	The Old Rectory More images
Church of St Peter	Shaftesbury	Anglican parish church	Late 15th and early 16th century	20 June 1952	ST8628722946; 51°00′21″N 2°11′49″W	1292132	Church of St Peter More images
Ox House	Shaftesbury	House	Probably late 16th to early 17th century	20 June 1952	ST8598222919; 51°00′20″N 2°12′04″W	1108758	Upload Photo
Pensbury House	Shaftesbury	House	18th and 19th century	15 October 1973	ST8634023552; 51°00′40″N 2°11′46″W	1218389	Pensbury House
The Grosvenor Arms Hotel	Shaftesbury	Hotel	Early 19th century	20 June 1952	ST8618822993; 51°00′22″N 2°11′54″W	1218032	The Grosvenor Arms Hotel More images
Cedar Court	Spetisbury	House	1716	14 July 1955	ST9104302837; 50°49′30″N 2°07′43″W	1110160	Upload Photo
Church of St Mary	Stalbridge	Anglican parish church	Late 14th century	4 October 1960	ST7334618190; 50°57′45″N 2°22′51″W	1108611	Church of St Mary More images
Market Cross	Stalbridge	Market cross	Second half of 15th century	4 October 1960	ST7349218002; 50°57′39″N 2°22′44″W	1153032	Market Cross More images
Thornhill House	Thornhill, Stalbridge	Country house	c. 1730	4 October 1960	ST7405814936; 50°56′00″N 2°22′14″W	1324460	Thornhill House More images
The Manor House	Stoke Wake	House	c. 1700	4 October 1960	ST7645006404; 50°51′24″N 2°20′09″W	1228071	Upload Photo
Jolliffe's Farmhouse Including Attached Barn	Stour Provost	House	17th century	16 August 1960	ST8316821805; 50°59′43″N 2°14′28″W	1324535	Jolliffe's Farmhouse Including Attached Barn
Church of the Holy Trinity	Stourpaine	Anglican parish church	15th-century tower	24 June 1985	ST8603209372; 50°53′01″N 2°12′00″W	1305170	Church of the Holy Trinity More images
Chapel, Approximately 90 Metres West of Manor Farmhouse	Stourton Caundle	Chapel	13th century	4 October 1960	ST7132514929; 50°55′59″N 2°24′34″W	1287276	Chapel, Approximately 90 Metres West of Manor Farmhouse
Sturminster Newton Castle	Sturminster Newton	Manor house	Probably 14th century	4 October 1960	ST7846913498; 50°55′14″N 2°18′28″W	1324461	Upload Photo
Sturminster Newton Mill	Sturminster Newton	Gristmill	16th or 17th century	4 October 1960	ST7819713519; 50°55′15″N 2°18′42″W	1153666	Sturminster Newton Mill More images
Church of Saint Bartholomew	Sutton Waldron	Anglican parish church	1847	16 August 1960	ST8620815705; 50°56′26″N 2°11′52″W	1110209	Church of Saint Bartholomew More images
Barn and Outbuilding Range 100 Metres North East of Tarrant Abbey House	Tarrant Crawford	Barn	Late 15th century	26 June 1953	ST9213103398; 50°49′48″N 2°06′47″W	1110841	Upload Photo
Tarrant Abbey House	Tarrant Crawford	Box-frame house	15th century	26 June 1953	ST9206103301; 50°49′45″N 2°06′51″W	1153838	Upload Photo
Church of St Mary	Tarrant Gunville	Anglican parish church	Late 14th century	14 July 1955	ST9251912670; 50°54′48″N 2°06′28″W	1305101	Church of St Mary More images
Church of All Saints	Tarrant Keyneston	Anglican parish church	15th-century tower	26 June 1953	ST9251604059; 50°50′10″N 2°06′28″W	1153944	Church of All Saints More images
Church of All Saints	Tarrant Monkton	Anglican parish church	15th century	14 July 1955	ST9439308820; 50°52′44″N 2°04′52″W	1172540	Church of All Saints More images
Church of St Mary	Tarrant Rawston	Anglican parish church	14th century	26 June 1953	ST9390506666; 50°51′34″N 2°05′17″W	1154056	Church of St Mary More images
Rawston Farmhouse	Tarrant Rawston	Farmhouse	Late 16th or early 17th century	26 June 1953	ST9387106663; 50°51′34″N 2°05′18″W	1324322	Rawston Farmhouse More images
Church of St Mary	Tarrant Rushton	Anglican parish church	12th century	26 June 1953	ST9374306058; 50°51′14″N 2°05′25″W	1118488	Church of St Mary More images
Church of St Mary	Turnworth	Anglican parish church	15th-century tower	14 July 1955	ST8211707490; 50°52′00″N 2°15′20″W	1110163	Church of St Mary More images
Church of St Mary	West Stour	Anglican parish church	13th century	16 August 1960	ST7846422907; 51°00′19″N 2°18′30″W	1152142	Church of St Mary More images
Church of St Nicholas	Winterborne Clenston	Anglican parish church	1840	14 July 1955	ST8398002796; 50°49′28″N 2°13′44″W	1324267	Church of St Nicholas More images
Church of St Nicholas	Winterborne Kingston	Anglican parish church	14th century	14 July 1955	SY8622597599; 50°46′40″N 2°11′48″W	1152548	Church of St Nicholas More images
Muston Manor	Winterborne Muston	House	Late 17th century	10 October 1985	SY8734097673; 50°46′43″N 2°10′51″W	1304719	Upload Photo
Quarleston Farmhouse	Winterborne Stickland	Farmhouse	15th century	14 July 1955	ST8366303992; 50°50′07″N 2°14′00″W	1172390	Quarleston Farmhouse
Whatcombe House	Whatcombe, Winterborne Whitechurch	Country house	1750	14 July 1955	ST8373501295; 50°48′40″N 2°13′56″W	1118543	Whatcombe House More images

== See also ==
- Grade I listed buildings in Dorset
