= River Winterborne =

River in Dorset, England

Coordinates: 50.80190°N 2.07748°W

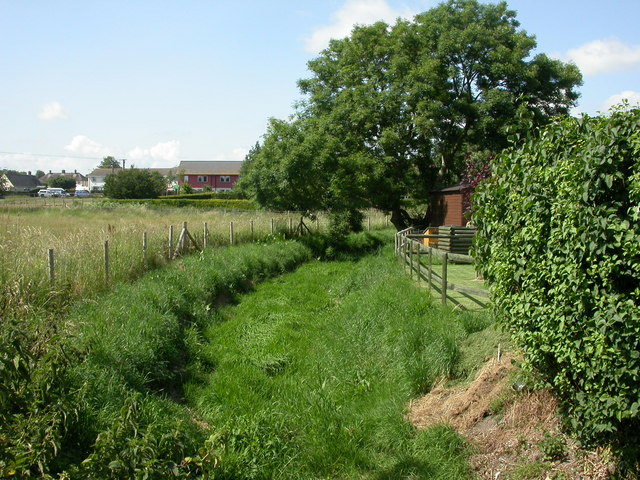
The River Winterborne at Winterborne Kingston.

The River Winterborne at Winterborne Zelston.

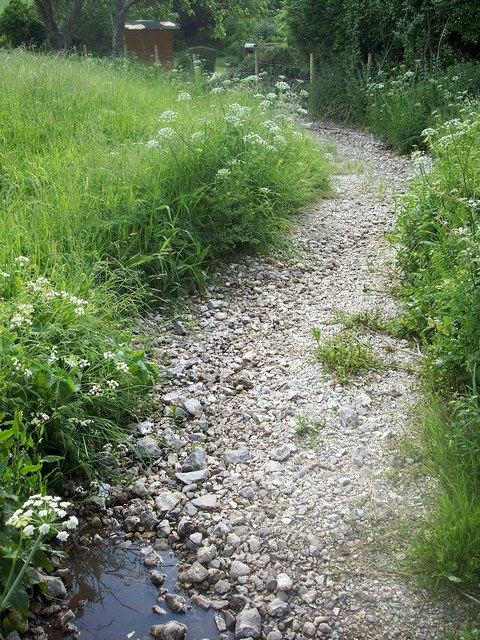
The River Winterborne drying at the end of May at Winterborne Clenston.

The River Winterborne is a river in Dorset, England.

The river is a chalk stream and it only flows overground during the winter, hence the name. It flows through a number of villages with a first name of "Winterborne".

It flows through the following villages in Dorset from its source to the point where it joins the River Stour:

- Winterborne Houghton
- Winterborne Stickland
- Winterborne Clenston
- Winterborne Whitechurch
- Winterborne Kingston
- Winterborne Muston
- Winterborne Anderson
- Winterborne Tomson
- Winterborne Zelston
- Almer
- Sturminster Marshall

The river flows at first southwards and then eastwards.

== See also ==
- South Winterborne
- Winterbourne (stream)
