= Edward Austin (cricketer) =

English cricketer (1847–1891)

Personal information
- Full name: Edward James Austin
- Born: 25 September 1847; Buckland Ripers, Dorset, England
- Died: 13 April 1891 (aged 43); Pimlico, London, England
- Batting: Right-handed
- Bowling: Unknown arm roundarm medium

Domestic team information
- Years: Team
- 1869: Oxford University

Career statistics
Competition	First-class
Matches	1
Runs scored	10
Batting average	10.00
100s/50s	–/–
Top score	10
Balls bowled	96
Wickets	2
Bowling average	29.00
5 wickets in innings	–
10 wickets in match	–
Best bowling	2/58
Catches/stumpings	1/–
- Source: Cricinfo, 26 December 2011

Edward James Austin (25 September 1847 – 13 April 1891) was an English cricketer. Austin was a right-handed batsman who bowled roundarm medium pace, though which arm he bowled with is unknown. He was born at Buckland Ripers, Dorset.

While studying at Trinity College, Oxford, Austin made a single first-class appearance for Oxford University against the Marylebone Cricket Club at the Magdalen Ground, Oxford in 1869. Austin ended unbeaten on 0 in Oxford University's first-innings of 75 all out, while in the Marylebone Cricket Club's first-innings of 229 all out, Austin took the wickets of Herbert Stewart and John West, finishing with figures of 2/58 from 24 overs. In Oxford University's second-innings, Austin was dismissed for 10 runs by George Wootton, with the university being dismissed for 124 to lose the match by an innings and 30 runs. This was his only major appearance for Oxford University.

He died at Pimlico, London on 13 April 1891.
