= Alweston =

Village in Dorset, England

Coordinates: 50.92°N 02.48°W

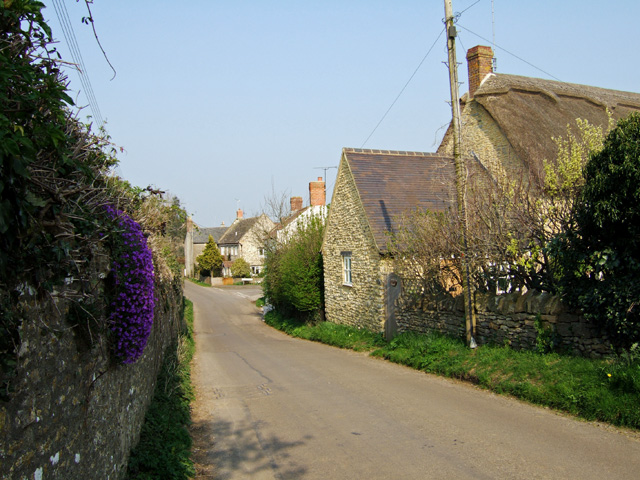

- Location within Dorset
- OS grid reference: ST6614
- Unitary authority: Dorset
- Ceremonial county: Dorset
- Region: South West
- Country: England
- Sovereign state: United Kingdom
- Police: Dorset
- Fire: Dorset and Wiltshire
- Ambulance: South Western

Alweston is a village in Dorset, England, situated roughly 3.5 miles (5.6 km) southeast of Sherborne. Historically it belonged to the Parish of Folke, in the Hundred of Sherborne. It lies just off the A3030 road, with Haydon to the north, North Wootton to the west, Caundle Marsh to the southeast and Folke to the south.

The village is known for its baking, and bread is delivered to Sherborne, Blandford, Canford Cliffs and Westbourne from the village.

== Landmarks ==
The village contains Munden House, which is a farmhouse consisting of a complex of stone cottages which were built before 1700. It is a certified AA five star gold rated bed and breakfast.
