= Anderson Manor, Dorset =

Grade I listed manor house in England

Coordinates: 50°46′40″N 2°10′17″W

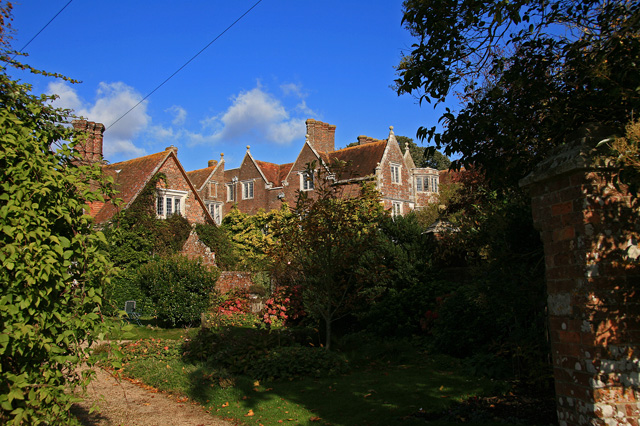
Anderson Manor

Anderson Manor is a Grade I listed manor house in the Dorset village of Anderson in England. It was built in 1622 for John Tregonwell. Today it is privately owned, but its gardens are open to the public under the National Gardens Scheme. The gardens are Grade II listed in the National Register of Historic Parks and Gardens.

== History ==
Anderson Manor was built in 1622 for John Tregonwell. It was restored around 1912 and listed in 1955. Its listing describes it as a Jacobean manor house; due to its completion date. But it appears the house was started in the 1590s by Sir John Moreton and purchased in 1613 by Tregonwell, who completed it. It is clearly partly Elizabethan – to which many of its features, such as the E-shaped floor plan, bear witness.

The manor remained in the Tregonwell family until 1902, when it was purchased by a Mrs Gratrix. When she died the house contents were sold by auction and, unfortunately, all the bespoke furniture and Tregonwell artefacts were removed. Other owners were the Tabors and the Cholmondeleys; finally, in 1975, the manor was bought by its present owners.

During the Second World War, the manor was requisitioned, initially, as the headquarters of the Small Scale Raiding Force (SSRF) attached to 62 Commando and became the planning centre for Operation Pinprick, a series of raids designed to force the Germans to waste valuable manpower defending a multitude of targets. In 1943 the SSRF were disbanded and the house was commandeered by the Special Operations Executive. There is still evidence of this wartime use in the building.

== Description ==
The listing describes the building as a three-storey manor house with a symmetrical front and projecting gabled wings. It has brick walls in garden wall bond with burnt headers, and stone dressings, on a flint plinth. The roofs are tiled, with moulded copings to its parapets and gables. There are ball finials to the gables at the apex and springing. The house has 2 brick stacks. It has a so-called "double-pile plan" with parallel roofs.

Rather more prosaically Treves describes Anderson Manor House as "a remarkably fine and stately building. It is of faded red brick faced with stone, has high gables and towering chimneys, handsome stone mullioned windows, and a general bearing of great dignity and charm. The village has vanished, so that the manor house and the church are left alone, one on either side of the faithless stream."

== Gardens ==
For several years Anderson Manor Gardens have been open to the public on a few days each year in order to raise money for the Macmillan nurses' charity or for the maintenance of St Michael's Church, Anderson. The gardens are set within the old walls and mature topiary of the manor house. Typical flowers include snowdrops and daffodils in the spring, wisteria and blossoms in May and June, old roses and peonies in midsummer and herbaceous borders in the autumn.

The historic formal gardens contain mature box and yew topiary, a pleached lime walk, a bowling green, two stone gazebos and an old rose walk by the River Winterborne. The walled garden has a parterre garden, herbaceous beds and an orchard. Beyond the garden the enclosed pasture is gradually being converted to woodland.

The 12th century church of St Michael's is now a private chapel, but is also open to the public.
