= Winterborne Houghton =

Village in Dorset, England

Coordinates: 50.8394°N 2.2571°W

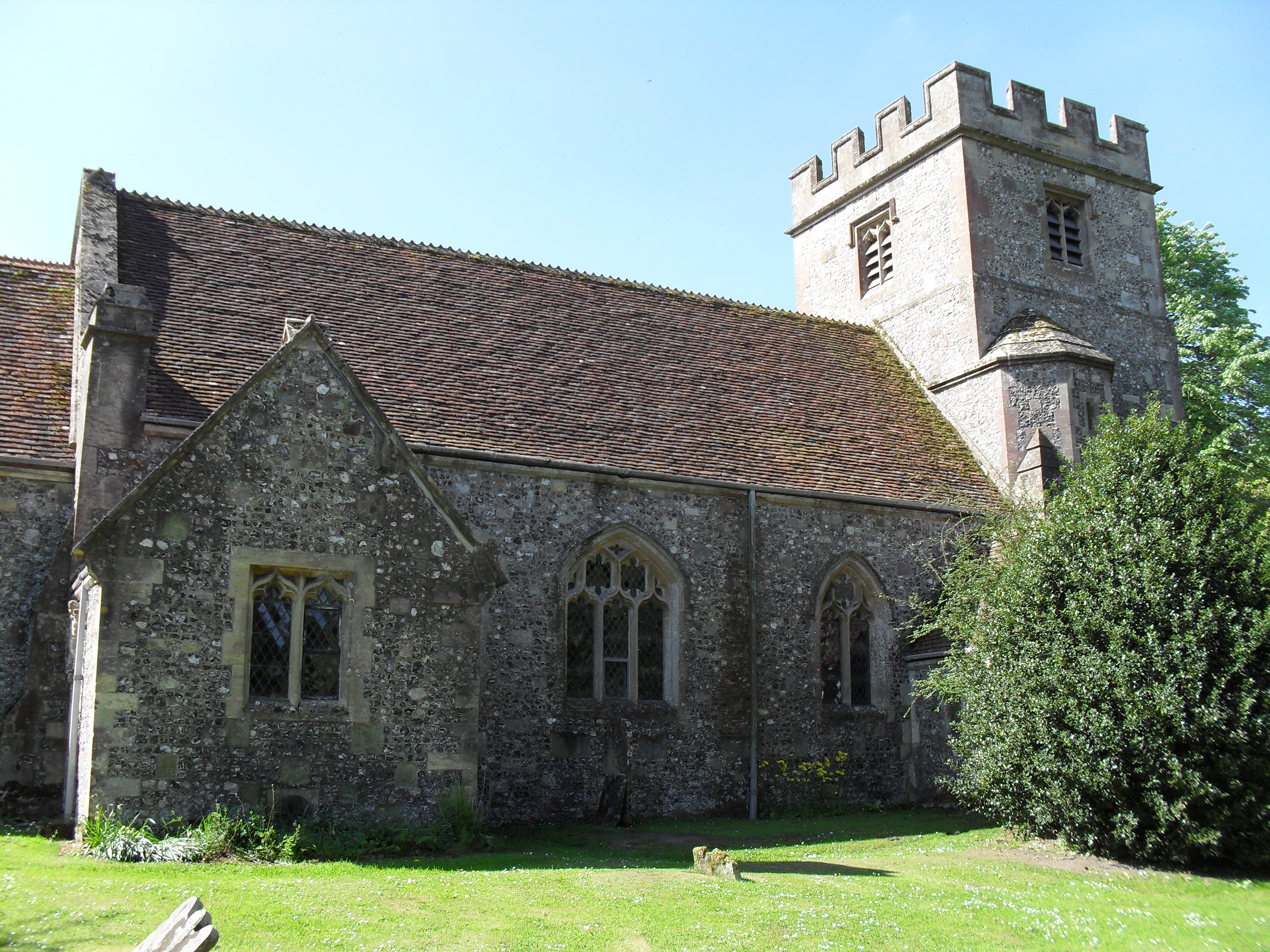
- St Andrew's Church, Winterborne Houghton

- Location within Dorset
- Population: 171
- OS grid reference: ST820045
- Unitary authority: Dorset
- Ceremonial county: Dorset
- Region: South West
- Country: England
- Sovereign state: United Kingdom
- Post town: Blandford Forum
- Postcode district: DT11
- Police: Dorset
- Fire: Dorset and Wiltshire
- Ambulance: South Western
- UK Parliament: North Dorset

Winterborne Houghton is a village and civil parish in north Dorset, England. It is situated in a winterbourne valley on the Dorset Downs, 5 miles (8 km) southwest of Blandford Forum. In the 2021 census the parish had 79 households and a population of 171. In 2011, the parish had 82 households and a population of 183.

The name derives from the River Winterborne, which has its source here. The river only flows overground during the winter, hence the name. To the east is Winterborne Stickland and the river flows on to this village, eventually joining the River Stour. To the southwest is Milton Abbas.

Residents of Winterborne Houghton used to be known as "Houghton Owls", in reference to the story of a villager who, when calling for help having got lost in the woods, mistook the calls of owls for answering human voices. In his book Dorset Villages Roland Gant posits the theory that Thomas Hardy used this tale as inspiration for the scene where Joseph Poorgrass gets lost in Yalbury Wood in Far from the Madding Crowd.

== Church ==
The Church of St Andrew, grade II listed since 1955, was designed by Thomas Henry Wyatt and built during 1861–62. It is in the Perpendicular style and faced with flint with a tiled roof. It has a simple plan with nave, chancel, north aisle and south porch. The tower is on the west end and is built in two stages with a battlemented parapet. Internally, the nave has a hammer beam roof and the chancel a wagon roof. The fifteenth century font has a carved octagonal bowl on an octagonal stem, and the other fittings are nineteenth century.

== Higher Houghton ==
Higher Houghton is a hamlet located at the top of Winterborne Houghton. There is a horse stable in Higher Houghton which is only used for special events (this was open to the public until 2020). Fields that are adjacent to said stables are occasionally used for 'cross country' horse races.

== Houghton Down ==
Houghton Down is a series of fields located towards the west of Winterborne Houghton. It is accessible from the Bridleway (nicknamed 'The Grovers Track') leading to Milton Abbas.

== Amenities ==
There used to be a post office in the village with a shop but this closed by 1998.

There is a fish farm in the village called 'Houghton Springs Trout Farm', which provides fish directly to consumers and to many restaurants and companies around the UK.

To the east of the village there is a small pond, Millennium Pond, which was completed in 2000 in time for the new millennium hence why it is called the 'millennium' pond. In 2004, the pond won an award for 'the best millennium project'.

Towards the north of the village there is an orchard named the 'Jubilee Orchard' which was placed on the Diamond Jubilee of Elizabeth II in 2012.
