= Delcombe Manor =

- Interactive map of Delcombe Manor
- 50.8427°N 2.2954°W
- Location: Milton Abbas, Dorset, England

Listed Building – Grade II*
- Designated: 14 July 1955

Delcombe Manor is a Grade II*-listed manor in Milton Abbas, Dorset, England.

== History ==
The manor was built circa 1750 using flint and stone from Milton Abbey. It was originally two separate cottages which were joined. It was designed in the Romantic Gothic architectural style.

In 1929 it was purchased by merchant banker Charles Jocelyn Hambro, who lived there with his wife Pamela Hambro and their children, including his son Charles.

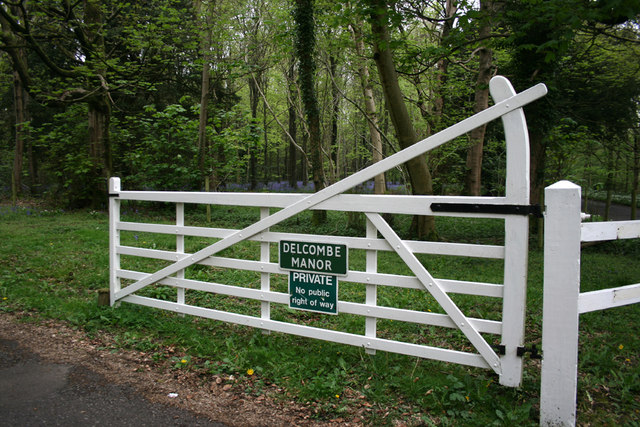
Gateway to Delcombe Manor

== Architectural significance ==
The manor is listed as Grade II* by Historic England; the listing was applied on 14 July 1955.
