= Haydon, Dorset =

Village in Dorset, England

Coordinates: 50.941°N 2.471°W

Haydon
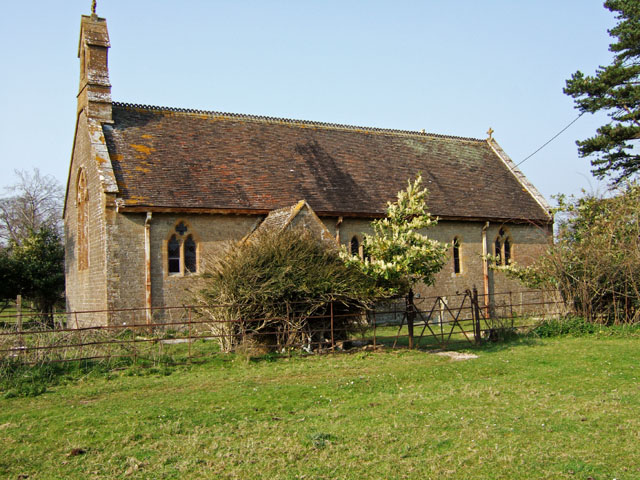
- Former church of St Catherine

- Location within Dorset
- Area: 1.89 km^{2} (0.73 sq mi)
- Population: 44 (2001 census)
  - Density: 23/km^{2} (60/sq mi)
- OS grid reference: ST670158
- Civil parish: Haydon
- Unitary authority: Dorset
- Ceremonial county: Dorset
- Region: South West
- Country: England
- Sovereign state: United Kingdom
- Post town: Sherborne
- Postcode district: DT9
- Police: Dorset
- Fire: Dorset and Wiltshire
- Ambulance: South Western
- UK Parliament: West Dorset

Haydon is a village and civil parish 4 miles (6.4 km) southeast of Sherborne, in the Dorset district, in the county of Dorset, England. In 2001 the parish had a population of 44. The parish touches Castleton, Caundle Marsh, Folke, Goathill, North Wootton and Purse Caundle.

== Features ==
There are three listed buildings in Haydon. Among them is the former St Catherine's Church, which is now in residential use. The small church, in dressed stone with a bell-cote, was built in 1883 to replace an earlier church; it had a medieval piscina and some 17th-century pews.

== History ==
The name "Haydon" probably means 'Hay-down' though the 1st part may be "hedge-enclosure". The village is one of the possible sources of the surname Haydon. On 25 March 1886 part of Haydon parish were transferred to the parish of Holnest. The transferred area contained 2 houses in 1891.
