= Longburton =

Village in Dorset, England

Coordinates: 50.9116°N 2.5000°W

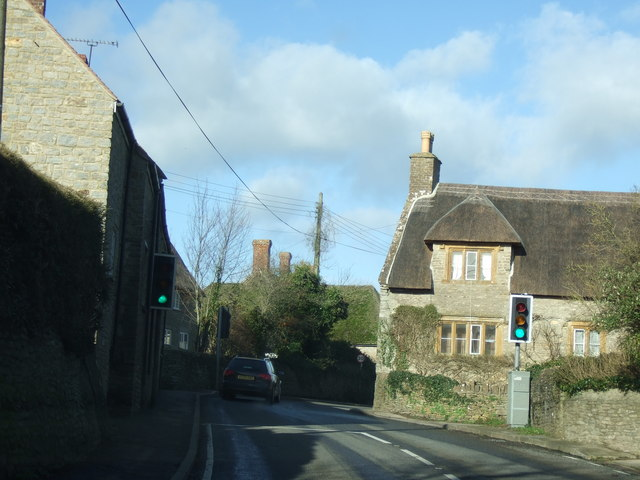

- Location within Dorset
- Population: 524 (2021 census)
- OS grid reference: ST648126
- Unitary authority: Dorset
- Ceremonial county: Dorset
- Region: South West
- Country: England
- Sovereign state: United Kingdom
- Post town: Sherborne
- Postcode district: DT9
- Dialling code: 01963
- Police: Dorset
- Fire: Dorset and Wiltshire
- Ambulance: South Western
- UK Parliament: West Dorset

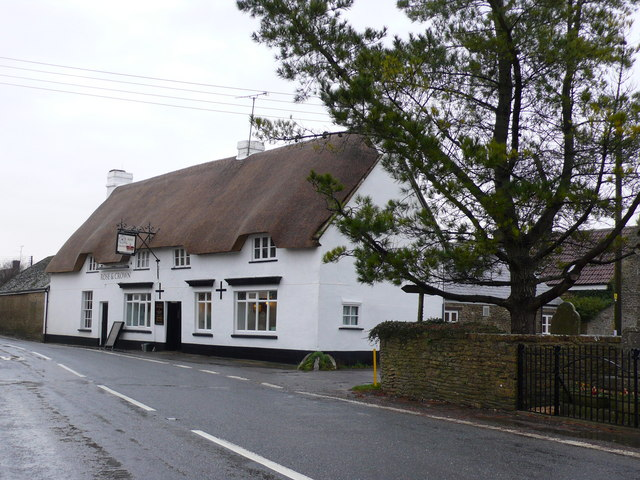
The Rose and Crown public house

Longburton or Long Burton is a village in Dorset, England, three miles (5 km) south of Sherborne. It is sited on a narrow outcrop of Cornbrash limestone, at the western end of Blackmore Vale. At the 2021 census, it had a population of 524.

== History ==
Medieval records show that Longburton belonged to the See of Sarum. In 1547, the Bishop of Salisbury granted the Manors of Long Burton and Holnest to Edward Seymour, 1st Duke of Somerset, the Protector. After his execution the manor was held by the Crown until it was granted to Sir Walter Raleigh. In 1594 Raleigh conveyed Long Burton and Holnest to John Fitzjames, who was already lord of the neighbouring manor of Leweston. The Fitzjames family lived at Redlynch near Bruton, Somerset. Their manors were sequestrated in 1645, but were returned at the Restoration.

To the north of the church chancel is a small chapel that was added by Leweston Fitzjames (d. 1638), who installed effigies of his parents Sir John Fitzjames (d. 1625) and Joan (d. 1602). Another monument contains similar effigies of three members of the Winston family from Standish in Gloucestershire: these are the parents and grandfather of Leweston's wife Eleanor. Eleanor's younger sister, Sarah, married John Churchill and was the grandmother of John Churchill, Duke of Marlborough, whose line included Sir Winston Churchill. The Christian name Winston had become a family name to commemorate Sarah Winston. Sir John Fitzjames (d. 1670), son of Leweston, and his wife Margaret Stephens are buried beneath a tablet on the floor immediately west of the church altar.

When Sir John Fitzjames Junior died in 1699, the manor passed jointly to his sisters, Grace and Catherine and ultimately was settled on Grace's husband Sir George Strode until he died in 1702. The manor then passed to his only daughter Grace Strode who subsequently married and was widowed before dying intestate in 1729. In the absence of her will the terms of her father's will of 1700 applied and matters were so complex that Parliament appointed a royal commission to determine how the Strode estates should be divided between Grace's daughters. It took seventeen years before an Act of Parliament was passed to agree the apportionment of the lands between the two heirs, one of whom had since died. The dead daughter's son received her portion and Long Burton manor passed to the dowager Countess of Hertford. She died in 1754 and her estates passed to Sir Hugh Smithson, husband of her only daughter Elizabeth, and subsequently Duke of Northumberland. His family sold the manor to Anthony Chapman, who built an elegant small mansion at Long Burton, which was later owned by Mark Davis. Chapman's widow sold the manor to J.S.W. Sawbridge in 1826. Sawbridge married Sarah Frances Erle-Drax, the heiress of Charborough, and assumed her surname.

With the coming of the railway to Sherborne in the mid nineteenth century the village developed rapidly as a dormitory community and most of the present housing stock was built as part of the railway boom. The village housing is mostly either seventeenth-century, late nineteenth-century or late twentieth-century.

The present parish is a tithing of the larger medieval parish of Long Burton. The name derives from burg, a fortified manor, and tun, a homestead or village. It was distinguished as Long Burton (presumably to distinguish it from the other four Burtons in Dorset) because of the length of its main street. The present form of the name as a single word seems to have arisen in the late nineteenth century. However, writing in 1980, author and Dorset resident Roland Gant insisted on using Long Burton, and commented that the village was "irritatingly often now spelled 'Longburton' on road signs, which to me changes its pronunciation in line with Warburton". The village is still recorded as Long Burton on the 1889 Ordnance Survey map of the area.

== Governance ==
Longburton and the surrounding area is a major part of Cam Vale electoral ward which also covers the villages of Alweston, Holwell and Leigh. The population of this ward at the 2011 census was 2,000. This ward is one of 32 that comprise the West Dorset parliamentary constituency.

== Geography ==
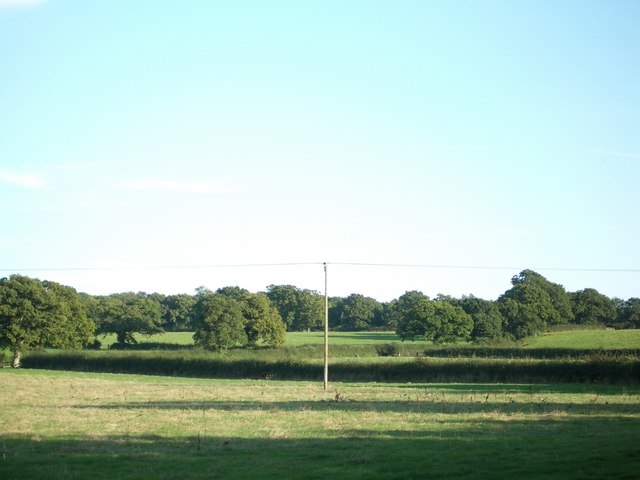
Pasture at Stockbridge Oak, southwest of Longburton village

Longburton village is a ribbon development along the A352 road, which was the turnpike between Dorchester and Sherborne. A set of traffic lights controls the passage of vehicles between stone cottages sited close to the road.

Longburton parish covers approximately 4 square kilometres (1.5 sq mi), measuring approximately 3 km long north to south and about half that west to east. The neighbouring parishes are Castleton, Folke, Holnest, Leweston, and North Wootton.

The surrounding landscape is typical Dorset pasture with small fields divided by hedgerows and small patches of woodland. Away from the narrow strip of Cornbrash limestone on which the village sits, the underlying geology of the vicinity is Oxford Clay, which here results in moist and fertile soil that yields rich dairy pastures. Although the dominant industry is dairy farming, other local industries have included stone-quarrying and more recently land has been given over to orchards. In the early eighteenth century at least five attempts were made to find coal in the area; this was documented by the local vicar William Sharpe.

== Demography ==
The population of the village rose regularly from 216 in 1801 to 339 in 1851, and then fell steadily until in 1931 it was only 241. In 1971 the inhabitants numbered 292 and during that decade increased by 44% to 420 by 1981 when a small housing estate was built on the south western edge of the village. The population has since increased slowly from 414 in 1991 to 435 in 2001 and 470 in 2011.

Census population of Longburton parish
Census	Population	Female	Male	Households	Source
1921	238				
1931	241				
1951	268				
1961	233				
1971	290				
1981	420				
1991	410				
2001	435	225	210	198	
2011	470	237	233	216	
2021	524	267	257	230	

== Architecture ==
The parish church is dedicated to Saint James the Great. It was originally a chapelry of Sherborne Minster. Most of it was built in the fifteenth century although the square tower was built local of rubble with freestone dressings about two hundred years earlier. The tower's upper storey has a crenellated parapet which was added as part of the main fifteenth-century development. The tower holds six bells with the tenor tuned to G#. Local superstition had it that if the tenor bell sounded dull someone in the parish would die within the week.

West Hall is a grade I listed Elizabethan manor house to the north of the village. It was owned by the Hymerford and Moleyn families, and later by the 17th century MP Thomas Chafe. In the 20th century, the house was used by the Royal Army Medical Corps.

The seventeenth-century houses in the village are traditional two-storeyed Dorset cottages, and some retain their thatched roofs. After the Second World War some bungalows were built in the heart of the village. Burton House, just north of the church, is a modern building incorporating a mixture of decorations and structural elements of different periods from all over Dorset. Set apart from the village is Leweston Farm, which may have been the old Long Burton manor house. The farm also has a late seventeenth-century five-bay barn.

Two substantial buildings mark the southern extent of the village on opposite sides of the road. The Methodist chapel built in 1878 stands to the East and the now disused Temperance Hall built in 1907 stands to the West.

== Records in Dorset County Records Office, Dorchester ==
The Longburton parish registers begin in 1589 (marriages and burials) or 1590 (baptisms). The latter continue without gaps to 1865. Marriages are likewise complete to 1842, except for the one year 1812. Burials are missing for 1797–1601 and 1804, and have not been deposited after 1812. There are banns for 1824–45 and 1869–1940. There is a printed copy of the register to 1812, while typescripts are available for the whole register for 1813–1837, burials being extended to 1865. Churchwardens' accounts cover a remarkable span from 1634 to 1897 with just two short gaps. Accounts for the Overseers of the Poor survive for 1681–1759; there are six settlement orders, nine removal orders and one bastardy order.

A court book of the Manors of Long Burton and Holnest survives for 1523 to 1609. There are deeds for various properties from 1705 onwards in the archive D/FFO in the County Record Office. One dated 1702/3 relates to property in Long Burton, Little Burton and Leweston.

The tithe map of 1843–4 has an attached apportionment. Another map of 1768 shows lands in Long Burton and Holnest. A facsimile record of land given for a school by J.S.W.S. Erle-Drax, Lord of the Manor, has also been deposited. The school records include log-books for 1872–1900 and 1920–1949 and an attendance register for 1853–1887. Minutes and accounts of the Longburton parish council are deposited for 1894 to 1935.

== Notable residents ==
The most notable resident of Longburton was Reverend Charles Herbert Mayo, the antiquarian who was vicar of Longburton from 1872 to 1912. More prosaically, in 1664 the probate inventory of the late Henry Gumbleton, village blacksmith was valued at £18-13-08.
