= Winterborne Muston =

Coordinates: 50.777°N 2.183°W

Housing development at Winterborne Muston.

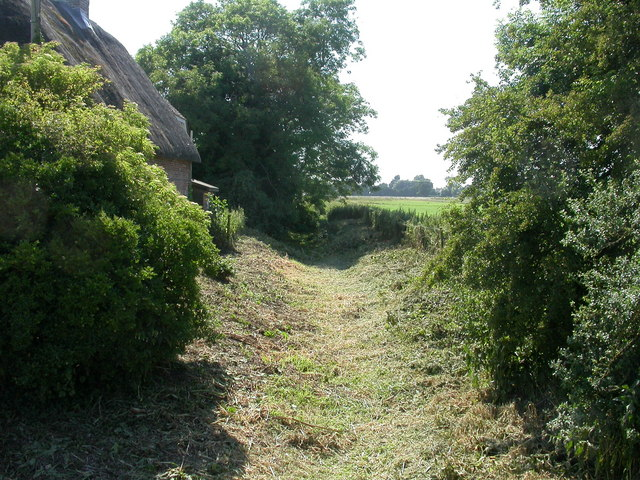
The dry River Winterborne at Winterborne Muston.

Winterborne Muston is a village in Dorset, England.

The first name of "Winterborne" comes from the River Winterborne, which flows from west to east through the village. The river only flows overground during the winter, hence the name. To the west is Winterborne Kingston and to the east is Anderson. The river flows through both these villages as well.

== See also ==
- Winterbourne (stream)
