= Milborne St Andrew =

Village in Dorset, England

Coordinates: 50.7779°N 2.2819°W

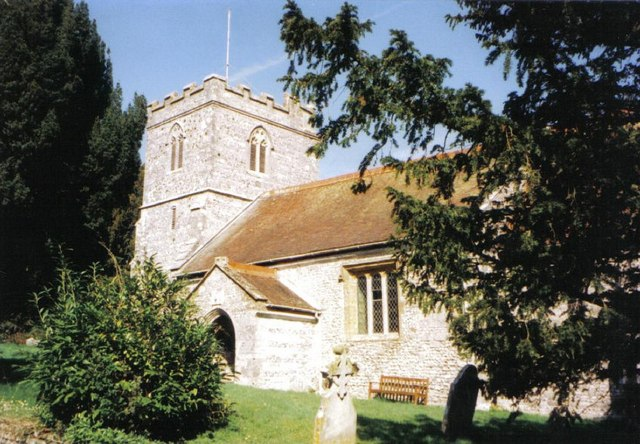
- Parish church of St Andrew

- Location within Dorset
- Population: 1,062 (2011)
- OS grid reference: SY805975
- Civil parish: Milborne St Andrew
- Unitary authority: Dorset
- Ceremonial county: Dorset
- Region: South West
- Country: England
- Sovereign state: United Kingdom
- Post town: BLANDFORD FORUM
- Postcode district: DT11
- Dialling code: 01258
- Police: Dorset
- Fire: Dorset and Wiltshire
- Ambulance: South Western
- UK Parliament: North Dorset

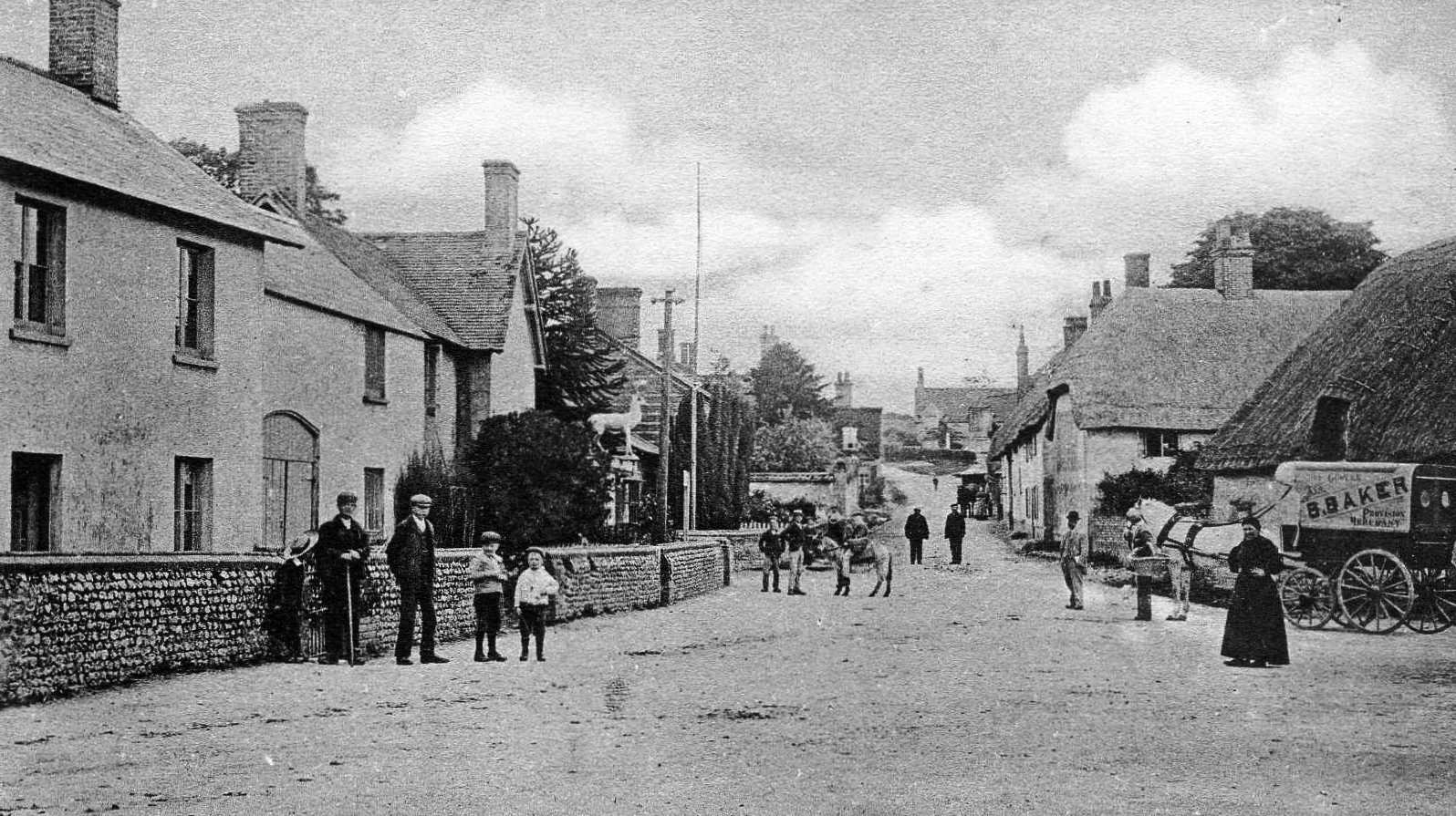
The Square, Milborne St Andrew, circa 1900

Milborne St Andrew is a village and civil parish in the county of Dorset in southern England. It is situated on the A354 road, 9 miles (14 kilometres) northeast of the county town Dorchester, in a winterbourne valley on the dip slope of the Dorset Downs. In the 2011 census the parish had 472 dwellings, 453 households and a population of 1,062.

== History ==
Weatherby Castle is an Iron Age hill fort that encloses about 17 1/2 acres (7 hectares) on a spur of land about 3/4 mile (1.2 kilometres) south of the village. Its structure comprises two concentric enclosures, though parts have been damaged by cultivation and ploughing. Pieces of Roman ware were found within the site in the 19th century.

In 1086 in the Domesday Book Milborne St Andrew was recorded as Meleburne; it had 10 households, 4 ploughlands, 5 acres (2 hectares) of meadow and one mill. It was in Puddletown Hundred and the lord and tenant-in-chief was Matthew of Mortagne.

There were originally two settlements within the parish: St Andrew to the south of the Dorchester-Blandford road, and Deverel to the north, though over time these coalesced into one settlement around where the road crosses the Milborne Brook. At the end of the 19th century St Andrew's ecclesiastical parish was enlarged by the addition of neighbouring Milborne Stileham to the south east (previously part of Bere Regis parish), though the civil parishes remained separate until 1933.

== Governance ==
Milborne St Andrew is in the Abbey electoral ward, which also includes Winterborne Kingston, Winterborne Whitechurch, Milton Abbas and Hilton. The ward population in the 2011 census was 3,897. The ward is part of the constituency of North Dorset that is currently (2024) represented in the UK parliament by the Conservative Simon Hoare.

== Amenities ==
There are a number of community facilities within the village, including an infants' school (Milborne St Andrew First School), a public house (the Royal Oak), a parish church (Church of England, dedicated to St Andrew and founded in 1069), and a sports club and pavilion, home of the Milborne Sports Football Club which was named Dorset FA Charter Standard Club of the Year in 2008. Milborne Sports Football Club also supports two youth teams.

== Literary connections ==
Thomas Hardy described Milborne St Andrew as "Millpond St Jude's" in his novel Far From the Madding Crowd. Weatherby Castle is the 'tower' of Hardy's novel Two on a Tower.

== Notable residents ==
John Morton, the 15th-century Lord Chancellor and Archbishop of Canterbury, was born at Milborne Stileham.
