= Walditch =

Village and civil parish in Dorset, England

Coordinates: 50.7314°N 2.7341°W

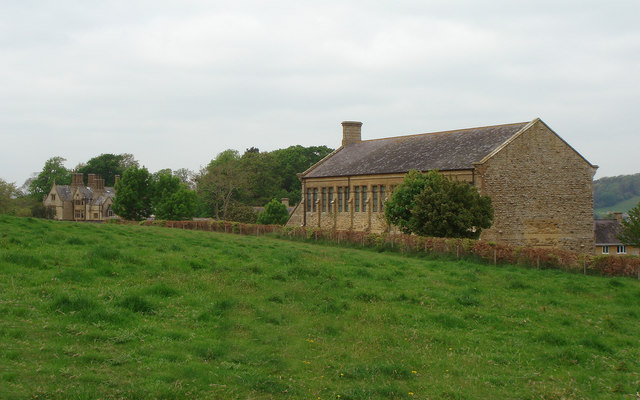
- The real tennis court at Hyde House, Walditch

- Location within Dorset
- OS grid reference: SY485925
- Civil parish: Bridport
- Unitary authority: Dorset
- Ceremonial county: Dorset
- Region: South West
- Country: England
- Sovereign state: United Kingdom
- Post town: Bridport
- Postcode district: DT6
- Dialling code: 01308
- Police: Dorset
- Fire: Dorset and Wiltshire
- Ambulance: South Western

Walditch is a small village in the civil parish of Bridport, in the Dorset district, in the ceremonial county of Dorset, England. It is situated about 1 kilometre (0.62 mi) to the east of the town of Bridport. The name Walditch is derived from an older term Waldyke, which alludes to the village's location: Walditch is located in the valley of a curved hill that encompasses the village; the hill has a dry stone wall still partially in place, which continues over towards Bothenhampton. In 1891 the parish had a population of 175. In 1897 the parish was abolished and merged with Bothenhampton and Bridport.

Walditch has a real tennis court, on the site of which Henry VII of England played during his visits to the area.

Walditch is composed of Old Walditch (the original Walditch) and lower Walditch, a housing estate built around 1998.

The village no longer has a stated member of clergy; the last person to fill this role being the Rev. Maureen Alchin, who was a local figure.

Walditch formerly lay within the Hundred of Godderthorne.
