= Frome St Quintin =

Village in Dorset, England

Coordinates: 50.8214°N 2.5726°W

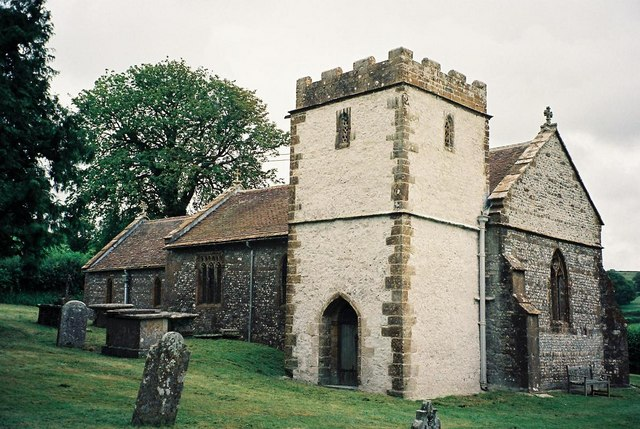
- Parish church of St Mary

- Location within Dorset
- Population: 167 (2021 census)
- OS grid reference: ST598026
- Unitary authority: Dorset
- Ceremonial county: Dorset
- Region: South West
- Country: England
- Sovereign state: United Kingdom
- Post town: Dorchester
- Postcode district: DT2
- Police: Dorset
- Fire: Dorset and Wiltshire
- Ambulance: South Western
- UK Parliament: West Dorset

Frome St Quintin is a village and civil parish in the county of Dorset, southern England, situated approximately 11 miles (18 km) northwest of the county town of Dorchester. It is located on an outcrop of greensand near the head of the Frome valley, among the chalk hills of the Dorset Downs. The area features naturally occurring springs, and the first habitation likely dates back to the Roman era. The parish church dates back to the 13th century. Just over 0.5 miles (0.80 km) west of the village, within Cattistock, lies Chantmarle, a 15th-century manor house with later additions.

The civil parish has a group parish council, Frome Valley Parish Council, together with neighbouring Cattistock and Chilfrome parishes.

== Demographics ==
Census population of Frome St Quintin parish
Census	Population	Female	Male	Households	Source
1921	140				
1931	110				
1951	121				
1961	129				
1971	120				
1981	130				
1991	150				
2001	157	81	76	70	
2011	171	90	81	69	
2021	167	92	75	74	
