= Winterbourne Steepleton =

Village in Dorset, England

Coordinates: 50.70679°N 2.53029°W

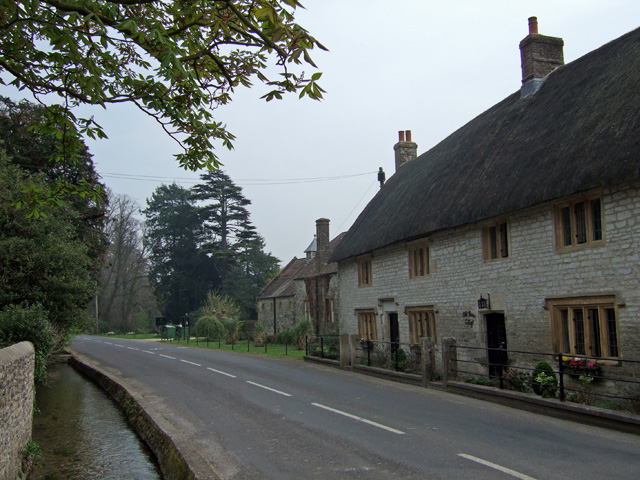
- Winterbourne Steepleton

- Location within Dorset
- Population: 297
- OS grid reference: SY628898
- Unitary authority: Dorset
- Ceremonial county: Dorset
- Region: South West
- Country: England
- Sovereign state: United Kingdom
- Post town: Dorchester
- Postcode district: DT2
- Police: Dorset
- Fire: Dorset and Wiltshire
- Ambulance: South Western
- UK Parliament: West Dorset

Winterbourne Steepleton is a village and civil parish in south west Dorset, England, situated in a winterbourne valley 5 miles (8.0 km) west of Dorchester, next to the village of Winterbourne Abbas. The name of the village derives from its site next to a seasonal winterbourne stream and from having a stone church steeple - one of only three medieval stone spires in the county (the others being at Iwerne Minster and Trent). In the 2011 census the parish had a population of 297.

== The village ==
Winterbourne Steepleton is a rural village set back from the main road. Notable buildings include Steepleton Manor, a large house built of Portland stone dating from 1870 and replacing a previous building. Close by is the thatched Manor Cottage, built in the 16th century, and Manor Farm, dating from the 17th century or earlier. Close to the east end of the parish church is the 17th century Mill House, built of stone and brick.

== The church ==
The parish church, dedicated to St Michael, dates mostly from the 12th and 13th centuries, although the nave has Saxon elements and the tower and porch are 14th-century addition. It is a Grade I listed building, having been inscribed in the register on 26 January 1956. The west tower, nave, chancel and south porch are built of rubble-stone with dressings of stone from Ham Hill, Somerset. The roofs are slated. The tower has three stages with buttresses to the lower two, and is topped by a plain parapet. The spire was added in the 18th century and is octagonal with pinnacles at the corners. Several of the windows date from the 15th century and have pairs of cinque-foiled lights with vertical tracery between.
