= Beer Hackett =

Village and civil parish in Dorset, England

Coordinates: 50.9044°N 2.5714°W

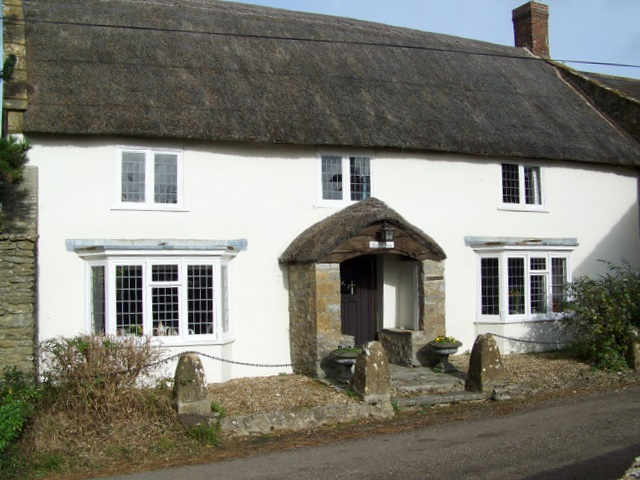
- Church Farm, Beer Hackett

- Location within Dorset
- Population: 100
- OS grid reference: ST600118
- Unitary authority: Dorset
- Ceremonial county: Dorset
- Region: South West
- Country: England
- Sovereign state: United Kingdom
- Post town: Sherborne
- Postcode district: DT9
- Police: Dorset
- Fire: Dorset and Wiltshire
- Ambulance: South Western
- UK Parliament: West Dorset

Beer Hackett is a small village and civil parish in west Dorset, England, situated 3 miles (4.8 km) southwest of Sherborne and 5 miles (8.0 km) southeast of Yeovil. The civil parish includes the small settlement of Knighton to the east. Dorset County Council's 2013 mid-year estimate of the population of the civil parish is 100.

Beer Hackett was not recorded in the Domesday Book of 1086. The nave and west tower of the parish church were originally built in the early 15th century, though the whole building was radically restored in the 19th century.
