= Langton Long Blandford =

Village and civil parish in Dorset, England

Coordinates: 50.8528°N 2.1457°W

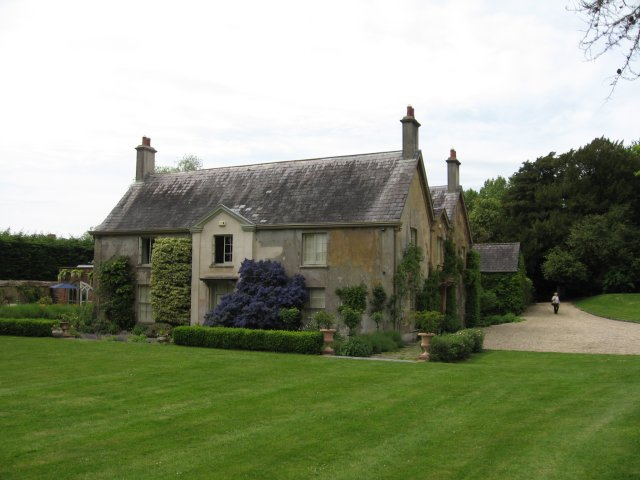
- The Old Rectory

- Location within Dorset
- Population: 130
- OS grid reference: ST897059
- Unitary authority: Dorset
- Ceremonial county: Dorset
- Region: South West
- Country: England
- Sovereign state: United Kingdom
- Post town: Blandford Forum
- Postcode district: DT11
- Police: Dorset
- Fire: Dorset and Wiltshire
- Ambulance: South Western
- UK Parliament: North Dorset

Langton Long Blandford, often abbreviated to Langton Long or just Langton, is a small village and civil parish in Dorset in southern England. It is sited by the River Stour, approximately 3/4 mile (1.2 kilometres) southeast of Blandford Forum. In the 2021 census, the parish had a population of 130 people in 50 households.

Forming the southeastern line of the parish boundary is an old track linking prehistoric Buzbury Rings, on nearby Keyneston Hill, to a ford over the river.

St Leonards farmhouse used to house a leper hospital.

The parish church was rebuilt in 1862.
