= Winterborne Tomson =

Coordinates: 50.776°N 2.165°W

- Interior of St Andrew's Church at Winterborne Tomson

- Location within Dorset
- Civil parish: Anderson
- Unitary authority: Dorset
- Ceremonial county: Dorset
- Region: South West
- Country: England
- Sovereign state: United Kingdom

Winterborne Tomson is a village and former civil parish, now in the parish of Anderson, in the Dorset, district, in the ceremonial county of Dorset, England. In 1931 the parish had a population of 35. On 1 April 1933 the parish was abolished and merged with Anderson.

== Overview ==
The first name of "Winterborne" comes from the River Winterborne, which flows from west to east through the village. The river only flows overground during the winter, hence the name. To the west is Anderson and to the east is Winterborne Zelston. The river flows through both these villages as well.

== St Andrew's Church ==
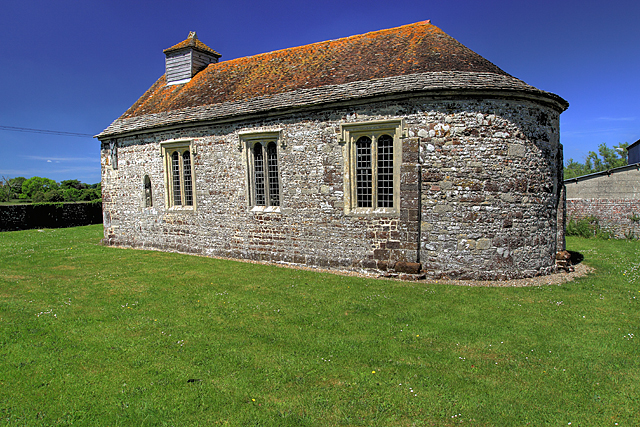
Exterior view of St Andrew's Church at Winterborne Tomson.

This former parish church is named after St Andrew. It is a small twelfth century building, with flint and rubble stone walls and a chamfered plinth. The roof is tiled with stone eaves courses, and there is a small timber bell-cote at the west end. The oak door is heavily studded. Inside it has a vaulted roof, white-washed walls and a flag-stoned floor. There is a late medieval gallery with a panelled front at the west end. The box pews are eighteenth century, as are the other furnishings of the church which were given by Archbishop William Wake (1657–1737) of Canterbury. According to Nikolaus Pevsner, it is "a gem of a village church, sufficiently different from others to arrest attention." The church is a Grade I listed building. It fell into disrepair in the early twentieth century and was declared a redundant church, being placed in the care of the Churches Conservation Trust, on 1 June 1972, and was vested in the Trust two years later.

== Tomson Farmhouse ==
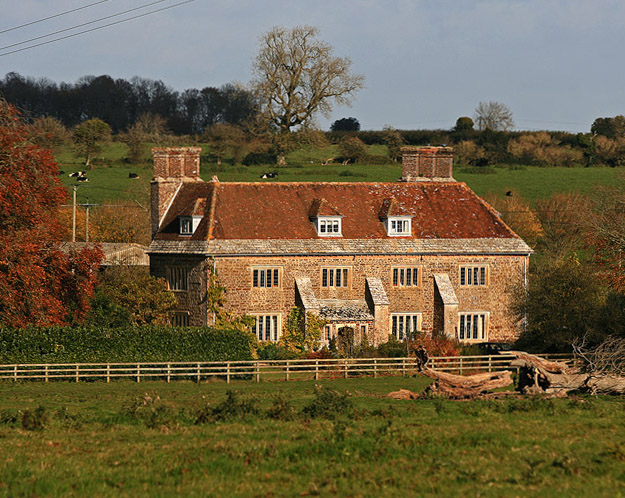
Tomson Farmhouse at Winterborne Tomson.

The picturesque stone Tomson Farmhouse dates from the early 17th century and is Grade II* listed. According to Pevsner, it is a building of "real architectural interest." The building is probably copied from Winterborne Clenston Manor.

== See also ==
- Winterbourne (stream)

== Bibliography ==
- Newman, John; Pevsner, Nikolaus (1972). The Buildings of England: Dorset. Penguin Books. ISBN 0-14-071044-2.
