= Hazelbury Bryan =

Village in Dorset, England

Coordinates: 50.8789°N 2.3632°W

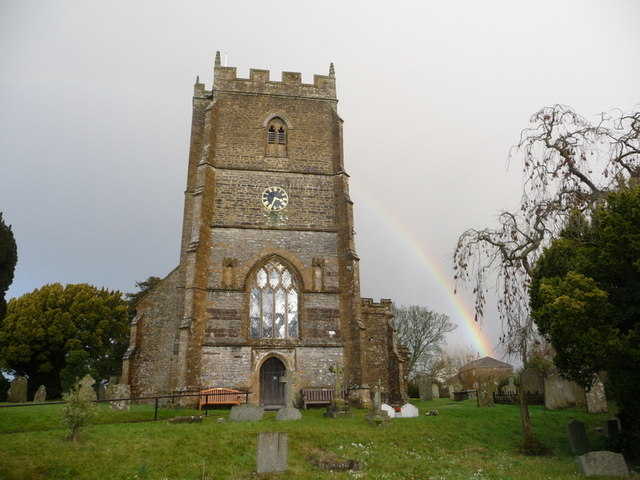
- Parish church of St Mary and St James

- Location within Dorset
- Population: 1,059
- OS grid reference: ST747089
- Civil parish: Hazelbury Bryan
- Unitary authority: Dorset
- Ceremonial county: Dorset
- Region: South West
- Country: England
- Sovereign state: United Kingdom
- Post town: Sturminster Newton
- Postcode district: DT10
- Police: Dorset
- Fire: Dorset and Wiltshire
- Ambulance: South Western
- UK Parliament: North Dorset

Hazelbury Bryan is a village and civil parish in the county of Dorset in southern England. It is situated in the Blackmore Vale, approximately five miles (eight kilometres) southwest of the small town of Sturminster Newton. The parish includes the hamlets of Droop, Kingston, Parkgate, Pidney, Pleck, Wonston and Woodrow. In the 2011 census the parish had 480 dwellings, 454 households and a population of 1,059.

In 1201 the village name was spelled Hasebere. The name is derived from the Old English hæsel and bearu, meaning a hazel grove or wood, plus the manorial name of the Bryene or de Bryan family; Sir Guy de Bryan, of Woodsford Castle, gave his surname to the village in the 14th century when he married the daughter of the First Earl of Salisbury.

The original settlement in the village is the hamlet of Droop, which is the location of the parish church. The church dates mostly from the 15th century, though it is perhaps the third building to have existed on the site. The other hamlets in the village are believed to have originated as a result of the Black Death twice afflicting the original settlement, and the villagers responding by burning it and rebuilding several smaller settlements on higher ground nearby.

The geology of the parish consists of Oxford clay in the northwest, a band of Corallian limestone and sand running from southwest to northeast, and Kimmeridge clay in the southeast. Drainage consists of several small streams flowing northwest and north into the River Lydden and northeast into the River Stour.

Hazelbury Bryan civil parish is the most populous parish within the electoral ward of Lydden Vale, which extends from Fifehead Neville parish in the north to Mappowder in the south and Glanvilles Wootton in the west. The population of the ward at the 2011 census was 1,967.

Businesses there include The Antelope Pub and SPAR Red Barn. There is also Alec's Field, a park with a pavilion and a play park. The only buses that go to Hazelbury Bryan are a school bus that goes to Sturminster Newton High School and back as well as a minibus for Hazelbury Bryan Primary School.
