= Anderson, Dorset =

Village and civil parish in Dorset, England

Coordinates: 50.7755°N 2.1723°W

Anderson
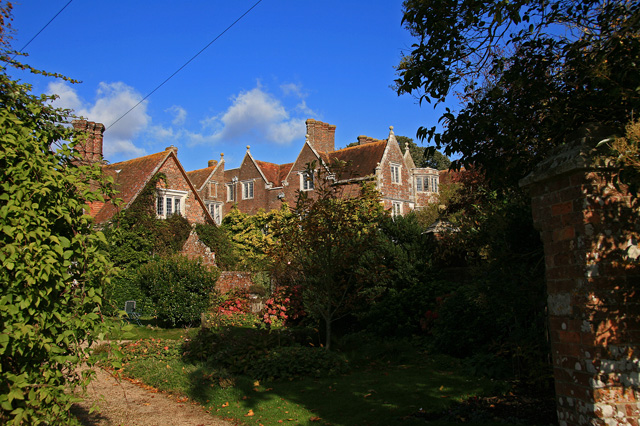
- Anderson Manor

- Location within Dorset
- Population: 60
- OS grid reference: SY880975
- Unitary authority: Dorset
- Ceremonial county: Dorset
- Region: South West
- Country: England
- Sovereign state: United Kingdom
- Post town: Blandford Forum
- Postcode district: DT11
- Police: Dorset
- Fire: Dorset and Wiltshire
- Ambulance: South Western

Anderson, sometimes known as Winterborne Anderson, is a small village and civil parish in Dorset, England, situated in the Dorset administrative district about 9 miles (14 km) northwest of Poole. To the west are Winterborne Muston and Winterborne Kingston and to the east are Winterborne Tomson (which is also within Anderson parish) and Winterborne Zelston. In 2013 the estimated population of the parish was 60.

Anderson Manor was built for the third John Tregonwell of Milton Abbas in 1622. It is constructed out of dark red brick with bands of vitrified headers.

The civil parish was formed in 1933, following the merger of Winterborne Anderson and Winterborne Tomsom.
