= Purse Caundle =

Village and civil parish in Dorset, England

Coordinates: 50.9567°N 2.4342°W

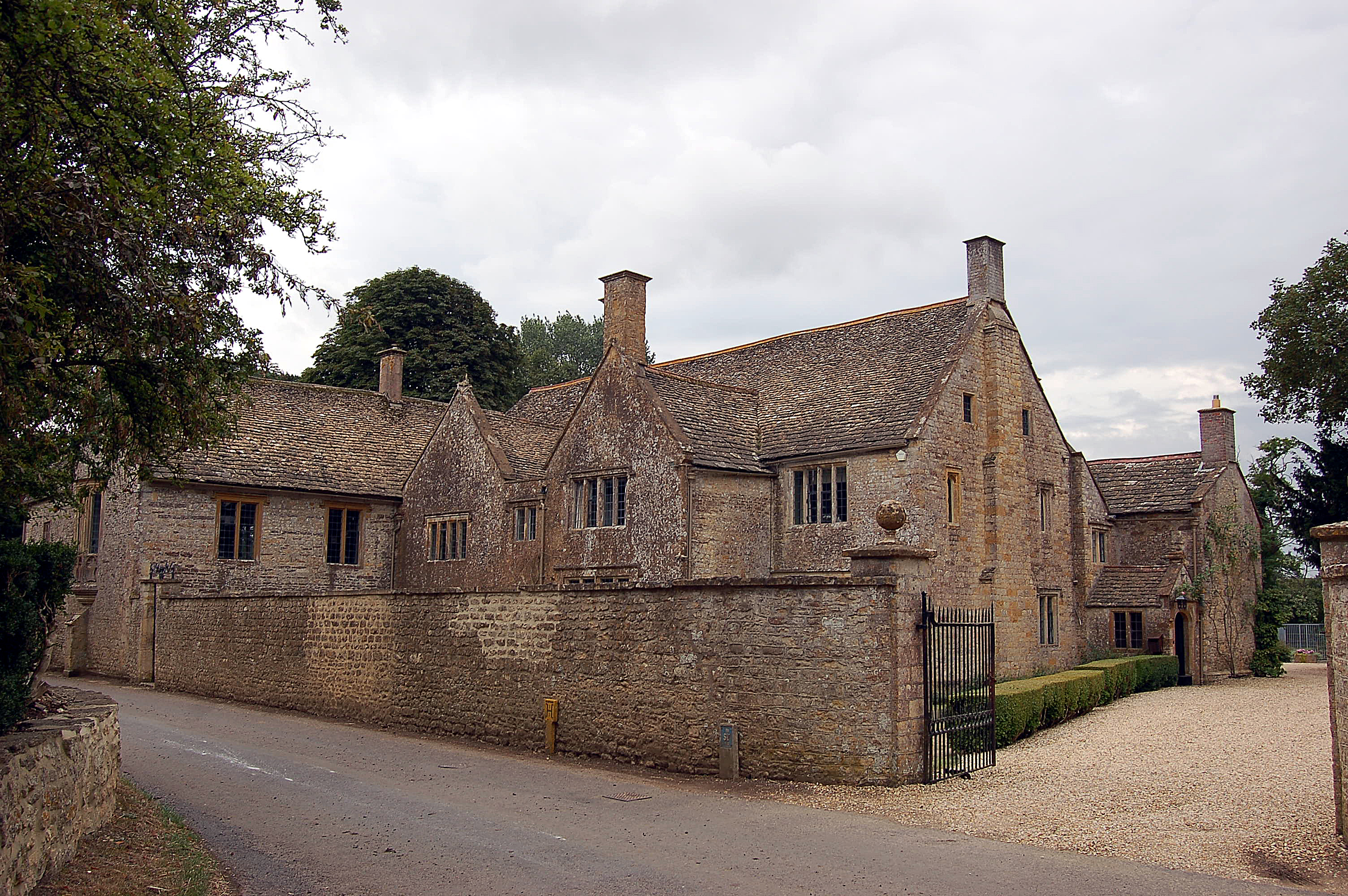
- Purse Caundle manor house

- Location within Dorset
- Population: 90
- OS grid reference: ST695175
- Unitary authority: Dorset
- Ceremonial county: Dorset
- Region: South West
- Country: England
- Sovereign state: United Kingdom
- Post town: Sherborne
- Postcode district: DT9
- Police: Dorset
- Fire: Dorset and Wiltshire
- Ambulance: South Western
- UK Parliament: West Dorset

Purse Caundle is a village and civil parish in the county of Dorset in southwest England. It lies within the Dorset Council administrative area, about 4 miles (6.4 km) east of Sherborne. In 2013 the estimated population of the parish was 90.

Purse Caundle manor house was built in the 15th century under the instruction of Richard Long, who bought 575 acres of land here in 1428. The manor's site was recorded as early as the Domesday Book in 1086, when it was a tenancy of Athelney Abbey.

The village church provides the final resting place for the seventeenth-century physician Nathaniel Highmore, whose father was rector here.
