= Cann, Dorset =

Village in Dorset, England

Coordinates: 50.9904°N 2.1839°W

Cann
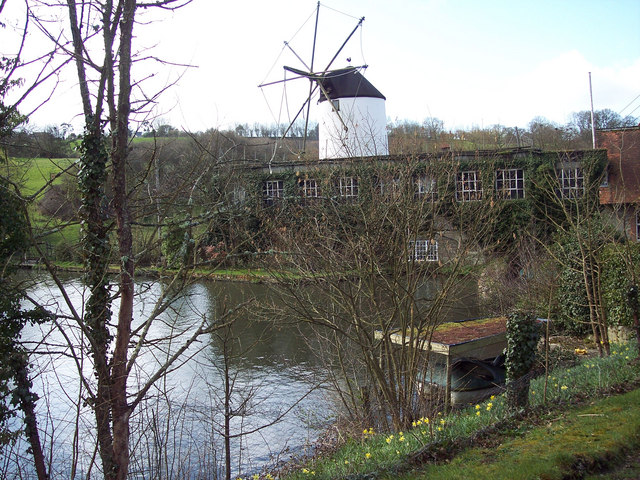
- Cann Mill

- Location within Dorset
- Population: 822
- OS grid reference: ST872212
- Civil parish: Cann
- Unitary authority: Dorset
- Ceremonial county: Dorset
- Region: South West
- Country: England
- Sovereign state: United Kingdom
- Post town: SHAFTESBURY
- Postcode district: SP7
- Dialling code: 01747
- Police: Dorset
- Fire: Dorset and Wiltshire
- Ambulance: South Western
- UK Parliament: North Dorset

Cann is a village and civil parish in the county of Dorset in southern England. It is situated on the A350 road in the Dorset administrative district, 1 mile (1.5 kilometres) south of Shaftesbury. The civil parish covers 2,600 acres (1,100 hectares) and has an underlying geology of Kimmeridge clay, greensand and gault clay. In the 2011 census the parish—which includes HM Prison Guys Marsh—had a population of 822.
