= Almer =

Village in Dorset, England

Coordinates: 50.78°N 02.12°W

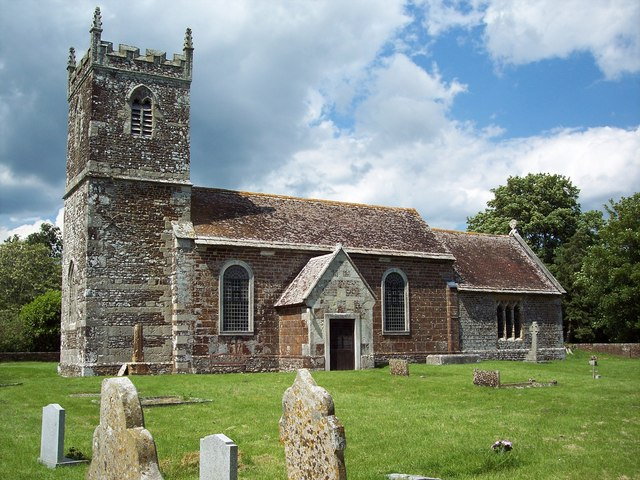
- Parish church of St Mary

- Location within Dorset
- OS grid reference: SY9198
- Civil parish: Sturminster Marshall
- Unitary authority: Dorset
- Ceremonial county: Dorset
- Region: South West
- Country: England
- Sovereign state: United Kingdom
- Police: Dorset
- Fire: Dorset and Wiltshire
- Ambulance: South Western

Almer is a village and former civil parish, now in the parish of Sturminster Marshall, in the Dorset district, in the ceremonial county of Dorset, England. Almer is located on the A31 road near Winterborne Zelston, Huish Manor, Sturminster Marshall and opposite the Drax estate. The main features of the village are Almer Manor, Almer Parish church and the old school house. The school was co-educational; it opened in 1925 and closed in 1964. The Almer School Honours tablet is now kept in Winterborne Zelston village hall. The seven residential properties in Almer are owned and let by the Charborough (Drax) Estate. In 1931 the parish had a population of 108. On 1 April 1933 the parish was abolished and merged with Sturminster Marshall.

Almer Parish Church is dedicated to St Mary and is Grade I listed.
