= Winterborne Clenston =

Coordinates: 50°49′39″N 2°13′50″W

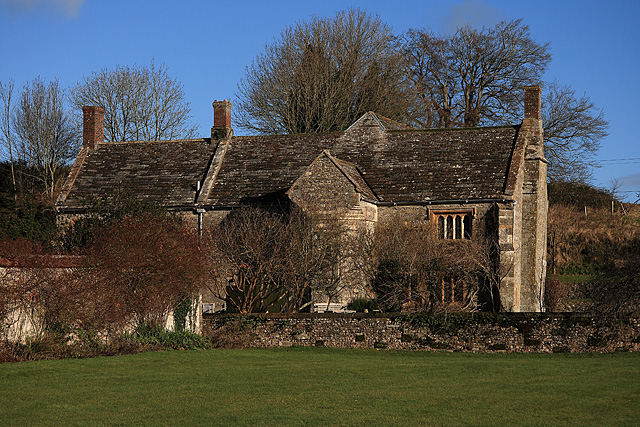
- The Manor House, Winterborne Clenston

- Location within Dorset
- Population: 40 (2013 est.)
- OS grid reference: ST838031
- Civil parish: Winterborne Clenston
- Unitary authority: Dorset
- Ceremonial county: Dorset
- Region: South West
- Country: England
- Sovereign state: United Kingdom
- Post town: BLANDFORD FORUM
- Postcode district: DT11
- Dialling code: 01258
- Police: Dorset
- Fire: Dorset and Wiltshire
- Ambulance: South Western
- UK Parliament: North Dorset

Winterborne Clenston is a small village and civil parish in Dorset, England, around 3 1/2 miles (5.5 kilometres) southwest of Blandford Forum. In 2013 the civil parish had an estimated population of 40.

The first part of the village name comes from the River Winterborne, which flows from north to south through the village. The river only flows overground during the winter, hence the name. In 1312 the patron of the church was Roger de Clencheston, who most likely had a farm here, after which the second part of the village name derives.

To the north of the village is Winterborne Stickland and to the south is Winterborne Whitechurch. The river flows through both these villages as well.

The parish church of St Nicholas dates from 1840. It is built in bands of stone and flint and has a spire on top of a narrow tower. It stands alone above the Winterborne on the site of an earlier church.

The village manor is a late-15th- to early-16th-century building of Purbeck and Portland stone with courses of flint. It was built in the sixteenth and seventeenth centuries and is a Grade I listed building. It has mullioned windows and a gabled staircase turret on the west side. Nearby is a sixteenth-century tithe-barn with a hammerbeam roof, also a listed building but falling into disrepair. In 2008, Historic England funded the erection of scaffolding and temporary repairs to the structure, but by 2016, a permanent repair had not been made.

About 100 metres (300 feet) east of the manor house is a field barn which is also a Grade II listed building. It is also built in bands of flint and stone and has a door made of planks and a thatched roof. It forms an important group with the Manor House and the Manor House Barn.

== See also ==
- Winterbourne (stream)
