= Buckland Ripers =

Village in Dorset, England

Coordinates: 50.645°N 2.500°W

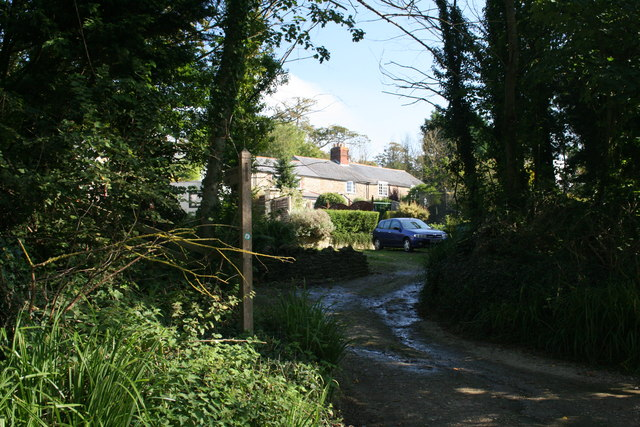
Buckland Ripers

Buckland Ripers is a hamlet in Dorset, England, situated four miles north west of Weymouth in the civil parish of Chickerell. Historically, it was a separate parish until 1894, and then part of Radipole parish from 1894 to 1993.
