= Holnest =

Village and civil parish in Dorset, England

Coordinates: 50.8869°N 2.4891°W

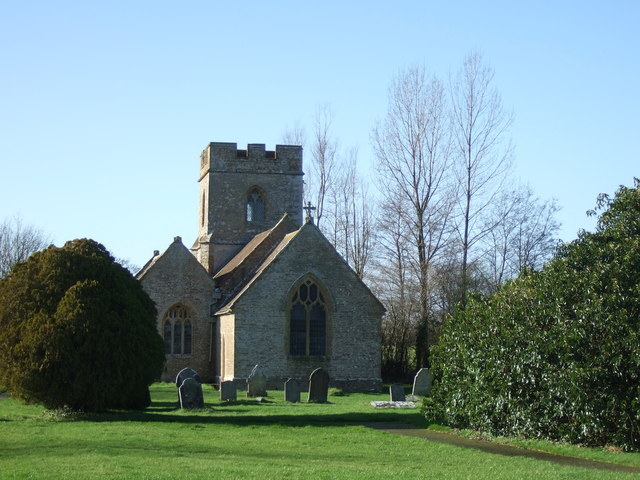
- Holnest parish church

- Location within Dorset
- Population: 220
- OS grid reference: ST655102
- Unitary authority: Dorset
- Ceremonial county: Dorset
- Region: South West
- Country: England
- Sovereign state: United Kingdom
- Post town: Sherborne
- Postcode district: DT9
- Police: Dorset
- Fire: Dorset and Wiltshire
- Ambulance: South Western
- UK Parliament: West Dorset

Holnest is a village and civil parish in the county of Dorset in southern England. It lies in the Blackmore Vale 4 miles (6.4 km) south of Sherborne. It is a scattered village, sited on Oxford clay which is drained by a small stream called The Cam. The A352 main road passes through the village. Dorset County Council's 2013 mid-year estimate of the population of the parish is 220. In the 2011 national census the population of Holnest parish combined with the small parish of Lillington to the north was 342; figures have so far not been published for Holnest parish alone.

Holnest parish church stands behind a wall and large gates close to the main road. The gates are the result of a mausoleum which used to stand in the churchyard. This had been built in 1872 by John Samuel Wanley Sawbridge Erle-Drax as part of his preparations for his own funeral, but no provision was made for its upkeep and after his death and interment in 1887 it fell into disrepair and was later demolished. A description of the building was given in 1906 by Sir Frederick Treves, who said it was "almost as large as the humble church" and "a gaudy building, in the Byzantine style, made up of grey and yellow stone, worried by much carving and enlivened by highly polished granite pillars. The rounded roof, which to be consistent should be of corrugated iron, is of lead.".

The church, dedicated to the Assumption of the Blessed Virgin, dates largely to the 14th and 15th centuries. Largely left untouched by the Victorian restorers, it contains a number of interesting features, including a Jacobean pulpit, rare examples of Georgian box pews with curved candle sconces above, an original medieval barrel-vaulted roof in the south aisle. In June 2016, Friends of Holnest Church was set up to support the Parochial Church Council in their efforts to maintain and restore the building and its grounds. In October 2016, author and historian, Adrian Tinniswood, was announced as their patron.

Holnest Park House is an 18th-century listed building which has more recently been divided into flats. It was badly damaged by a fire in 2010.
