= Glanvilles Wootton =

Village in Dorset, England

Coordinates: 50.8724°N 2.4597°W

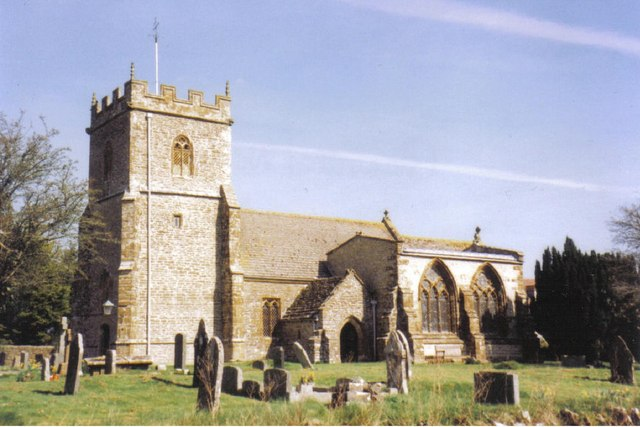
- Parish church of St Mary

- Location within Dorset
- Population: 196
- OS grid reference: ST678082
- Unitary authority: Dorset
- Ceremonial county: Dorset
- Region: South West
- Country: England
- Sovereign state: United Kingdom
- Post town: Sherborne
- Postcode district: DT9
- Police: Dorset
- Fire: Dorset and Wiltshire
- Ambulance: South Western
- UK Parliament: West Dorset

Glanvilles Wootton, or Wootton Glanville, is a village and civil parish in the county of Dorset in southern England. It is situated in the Blackmore Vale under the scarp of the Dorset Downs, five miles (eight kilometres) south of Sherborne. In the 2011 Census the parish had a population of 196.

To the north of the village is Round Chimneys Farm, which used to be a manor house and home of John Churchill, 1st Duke of Marlborough. The Farm, Grade II listed since 1960, "originated c.1590s, probably added to 1632 with extensive alterations and demolitions C19". One mile (1.5 kilometres) southeast of the village is the hill fort Dungeon Hill.

According to Dorset OPC, "the name of the Parish was changed in 1985, having previously been Wootton Glanville". The Parish Church is St Mary the Virgin and its register starts at the year 1546. It has been Grade I listed since 1964 as "mainly C14" modifications made in the 15th century and the early 19th century. A great deal of additional historic information about the community and its structures is provided by a document titled An Inventory of the Historical Monuments in Dorset, Volume 3, Central. Originally published by Her Majesty's Stationery Office, London, 1970.

One of the most significant properties in the area, The Manor House, Glanvilles Wootton, is a Georgian manor house, which incorporates an earlier 17th-century house, on 88 acres of parks, pastures and gardens, according to Country Life (magazine). The original house is believed to have been built circa 1616 by George Williams, originally from Wales; the newer Georgian home was built in 1804 by Glanvilles Wootton.

The "MANOR HOUSE FARMHOUSE WOOTTON GLANVILLES FARM" has been Grade-II listed since 1974. The farm house appears to have originated in the mid 1800s but was modified circa 1978.
