= Lillington, Dorset =

Hamlet in Dorset, England

Coordinates: 50.9130°N 2.5290°W

Lillington
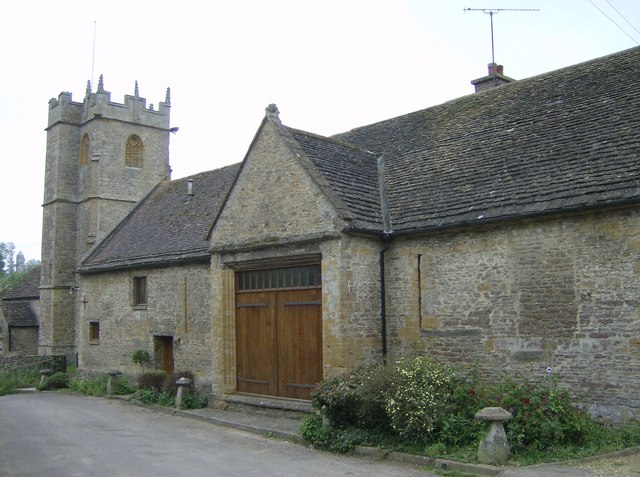
- Lillington

- Location within Dorset
- Population: 50
- OS grid reference: ST629128
- Unitary authority: Dorset
- Ceremonial county: Dorset
- Region: South West
- Country: England
- Sovereign state: United Kingdom
- Police: Dorset
- Fire: Dorset and Wiltshire
- Ambulance: South Western

Lillington is a hamlet and civil parish in north west Dorset, England, situated 3 miles (4.8 km) south of Sherborne. Dorset County Council estimate that the population of the civil parish was 50 in 2013.

The underlying geology in Lillington is Forest Marble, which has produced soil rich in clay. The parish church is small and has a 13th-century nave. In 1605 Sir Walter Raleigh's second son, Carew, was christened here. The barn next to the church has two porches and seven bays and also dates from the start of the 17th century.
