= North Wootton, Dorset =

Hamlet and civil parish in Dorset, England

Coordinates: 50.9285°N 2.4919°W

North Wootton
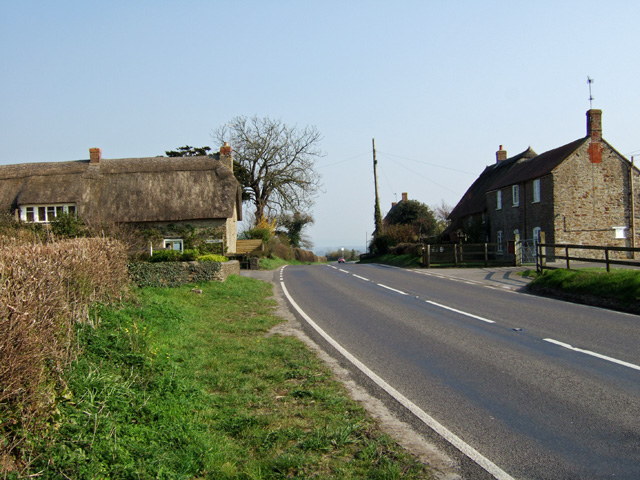
- North Wootton

- Location within Dorset
- Population: 50
- OS grid reference: ST655145
- Civil parish: North Wootton
- Unitary authority: Dorset
- Ceremonial county: Dorset
- Region: South West
- Country: England
- Sovereign state: United Kingdom
- Post town: Sherborne
- Postcode district: DT9
- Police: Dorset
- Fire: Dorset and Wiltshire
- Ambulance: South Western
- UK Parliament: West Dorset

North Wootton is a hamlet and civil parish in Dorset, England, situated approximately 1.5 miles (2.4 km) southeast of Sherborne. It is sited on a narrow band of Cornbrash limestone, with Oxford clay adjacent to the southeast and Forest Marble to the northwest. In 2013 the estimated population of the parish was 50.

The land of the parish has traditionally been owned by the owner of Sherborne Castle, so past owners have included Sir Walter Raleigh and bishops of Salisbury Cathedral. Residents of the parish previously had to take the deceased to Sherborne Abbey for burial; this arrangement stopped in 1618.
