= Winterborne Zelston =

Village and civil parish in Dorset, England

Coordinates: 50.7774°N 2.146°W

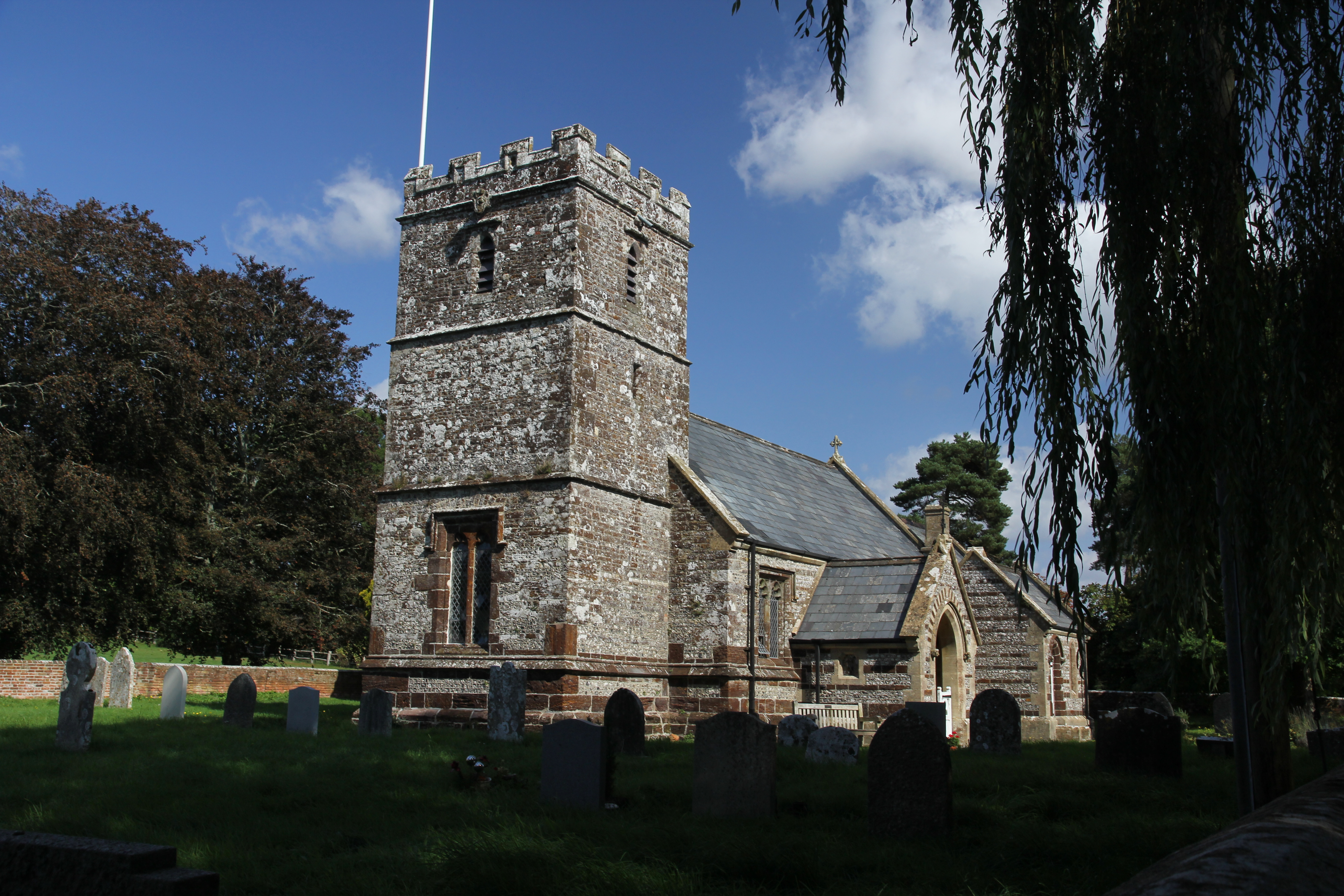
- St Mary's Church, Winterborne Zelston

- Location within Dorset
- Population: 90
- OS grid reference: SY898976
- Unitary authority: Dorset
- Ceremonial county: Dorset
- Region: South West
- Country: England
- Sovereign state: United Kingdom
- Post town: Blandford Forum
- Postcode district: DT11
- Police: Dorset
- Fire: Dorset and Wiltshire
- Ambulance: South Western
- UK Parliament: North Dorset

Winterborne Zelston is a village and civil parish in north Dorset, England. It is situated in a winterbourne valley on the A31 road eight miles (thirteen kilometres) south of Blandford Forum and 10 mi (16 km) northwest of Poole. The parish had a population of 141 in 2001. In 2013 the estimated population of the civil parish was 90.

The first name of "Winterborne" comes from the River Winterborne, which flows from west to east through the village. Zelstone is probably from the name of the Zeals family. The river only flows overground during the winter, hence the name. To the west is Winterborne Tomson and to the north-east is Almer. The river flows through both these villages as well.

Village noticeboard at Winterborne Zelston

== The church ==
The parish church is dedicated to St Mary and is a Grade II listed building, being inscribed in the register on 14 July 1955. The tower dates to the fifteenth century but the rest of the building was rebuilt by the architect Thomas Henry Wyatt in 1866, using some materials from an earlier building. Although the main fabric dates from this rebuild, the building has several older features such as a fourteenth-century doorway in the south vestry wall, and some of the windows in the chancel, which are thirteenth-century. The tower is of rubble stone while the rest of the church is banded with flint and stone and the roofs are slated. The plan consists of nave, chancel, north aisle, south vestry, south porch and west tower. The tower has three stages, the parapet being battlemented and there being a gargoyle on the west wall. Internally, the nave has an arch-braced collar beam roof, while the chancel has a wagon roof with plaster panels and moulded ribs.
