= Winterborne Whitechurch =

Village and civil parish in Dorset, England

Coordinates: 50.8007°N 2.2321°W

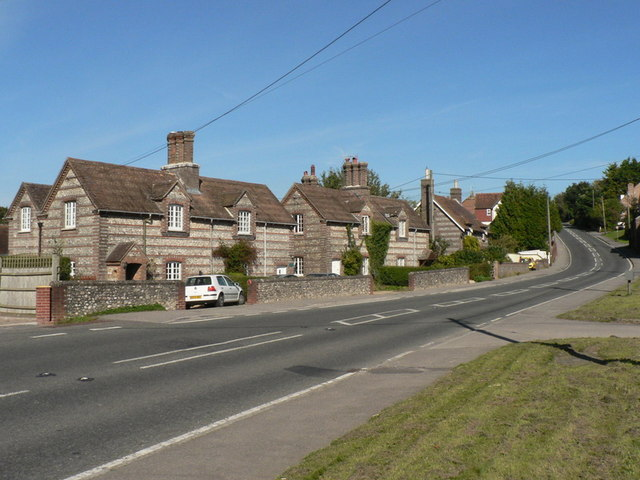
- Blandford Hill, Winterborne Whitechurch

- Location within Dorset
- Population: 734
- OS grid reference: ST837002
- Unitary authority: Dorset
- Ceremonial county: Dorset
- Region: South West
- Country: England
- Sovereign state: United Kingdom
- Post town: Blandford Forum
- Postcode district: DT11
- Police: Dorset
- Fire: Dorset and Wiltshire
- Ambulance: South Western
- UK Parliament: North Dorset

Lower Street

Winterborne Whitechurch is a village and civil parish in central Dorset, England, situated in a winterbourne valley on the A354 road on the Dorset Downs five miles (eight kilometres) southwest of Blandford Forum. As calculated in the 2021 census, Winterborne Whitechurch currently has a population of 734. To contrast, in the 2011 census the civil parish had 354 dwellings, 331 households and a population of 757.

== History ==
Evidence of prehistoric human activity in the parish consists of 7 barrows and a linear dyke known as Combs Ditch. The dyke was probably a boundary in the Iron Age but was subsequently modified until it had a more defensive purpose by the end of the Roman occupation. One of the barrows near the dyke was excavated in 1864; one cremation and four inhumations were found, as well as crude arrowheads within a bucket urn. There used to be at least five other barrows but these have been destroyed by more recent human activity.

In 1086 in the Domesday Book Winterborne Whitechurch was recorded as Wintreborne; it had 3 households, 1.5 ploughlands and 6 acres (2.4 hectares) of meadow. It was in the hundred of Combsditch, and the lord and tenant-in-chief was Milton Abbey.

Medieval settlement remains, formerly part of Whitechurch, lie on either side of the River Winterborne, south of the present village. The remains indicate a change in the village morphology, from original settlement along the north–south river to later settlement along the Dorchester-Blandford Road. The change probably took place over a long period of time but it is likely to have been accelerated in 1752 when the road became a turnpike; even now the process is not complete since West Farm and cottages at Lower Street still represent the former layout.

The remains consist of twenty-seven long closes, ten on the west side of the river and seventeen on the east. They measure from 64 to 174 m (210 to 571 ft) in length and from 27 to 41 m (89 to 135 ft) in width and are bounded by low banks up to 4.5 m (14 ft 9 in) wide, and up to 1 m (3 ft 3 in) high. At the uphill ends are quarries and some poorly defined rectangular platforms measuring about 10 by 14 m (33 by 46 ft). At the lower ends are uneven depressions and at least four fairly well-preserved building platforms, each measuring some 9 by 15 m (30 by 49 ft).

The parish church, dedicated to St Mary, has a chancel dating to around 1200, a 14th-century crossing and 15th-century south chapel and central tower. The nave was rebuilt in 1844 by Benjamin Ferrey, who also added a south porch and north and south aisles. Until 1933 the church and the western part of the village formed part of neighbouring Milton Abbas parish, resulting in Winterborne Whitechurch church standing outside its own parish.

The non-conformist preacher John Westley, grandfather of John and Charles Wesley, was appointed Vicar of Winterborne Whitechurch by Oliver Cromwell's Commission of Triers in 1658. He was imprisoned for not using the Book of Common Prayer and ejected in 1662, delivering his farewell sermon to a weeping audience on 17 August that year.

== Geography ==
Winterborne Whitechurch parish covers 3,436 acres (1,390 ha) in the valley of the Winterborne brook. The underlying geology is chalk. Measured directly, Winterborne Whitechurch village is about 5 mi (8 km) southwest of Blandford Forum, 12 mi (19 km) northwest of Poole and 11 mi (18 km) northeast of Dorchester. The northern part of Winterborne Whitechurch parish is within the Dorset National Landscape area.

== Amenities ==
The village has a federated primary school, Dunbury CofE Academy, for Key Stage Two pupils; Reception and Key Stage One pupils go to a second Dunbury site in neighbouring Winterborne Kingston. The village has a village hall, run by the village hall committee and available for hire. There is a farm shop and tea room to the east of the village. The village has in the past had a post office and a pub (The Milton Arms).
