= Winterborne Stickland =

Village and civil parish in Dorset, England

Coordinates: 50.8405°N 2.2353°W

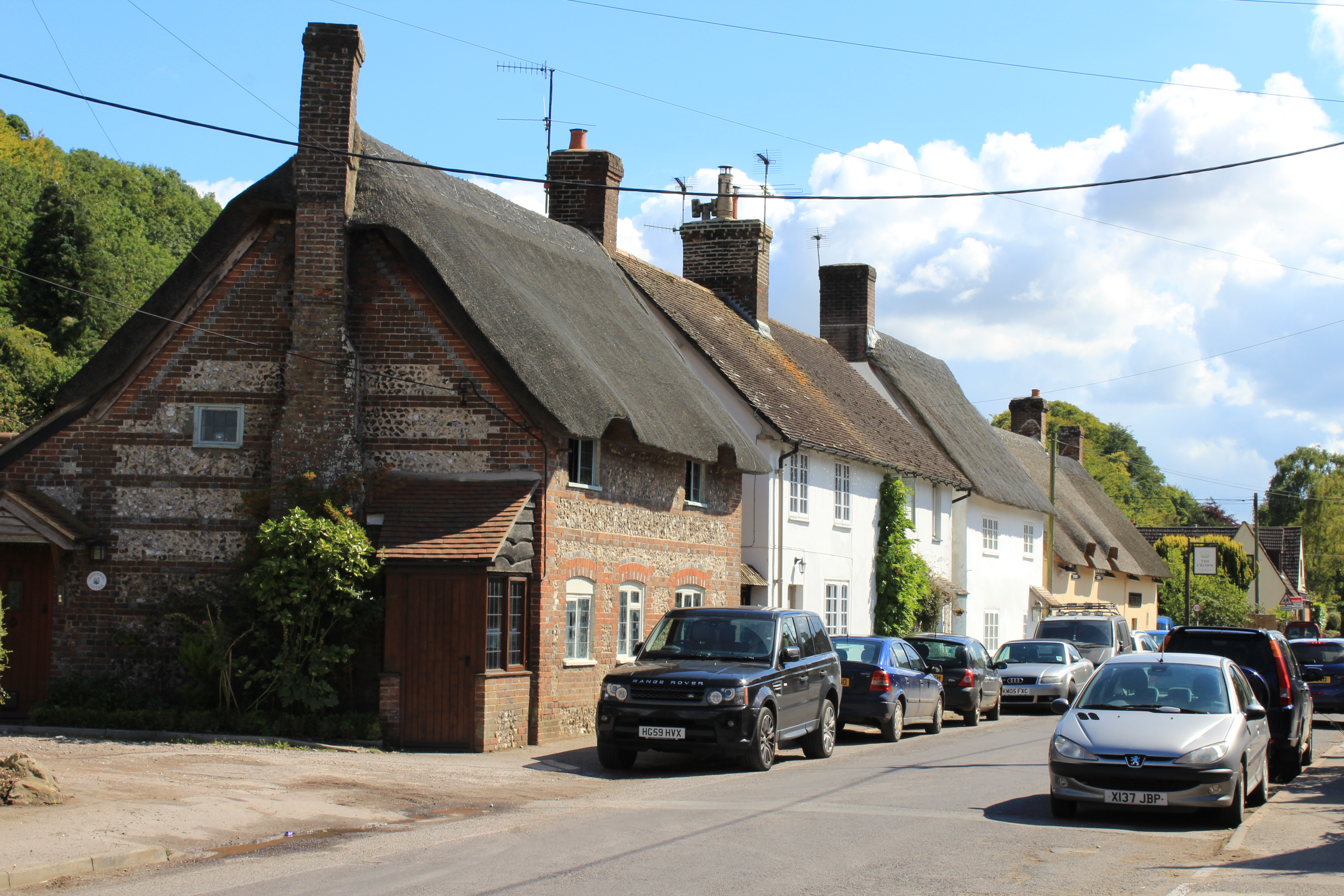
- Winterborne Stickland

- Location within Dorset
- Population: 520
- OS grid reference: ST835046
- Unitary authority: Dorset
- Ceremonial county: Dorset
- Region: South West
- Country: England
- Sovereign state: United Kingdom
- Post town: Blandford Forum
- Postcode district: DT11
- Police: Dorset
- Fire: Dorset and Wiltshire
- Ambulance: South Western
- UK Parliament: North Dorset
- Website: Winterborne Stickland Village Website

Winterborne Stickland is a village and civil parish in Dorset in southern England. It is about 4 miles (6 km) west of Blandford Forum. In 2013 the parish had an estimated population of 520. In the 2011 census the parish, combined with the smaller neighbouring parishes of Winterborne Clenston to the south and Turnworth to the north, recorded a population of 653. For unknown reasons, the 1881 census listed 10 residents of Chorley, Lancashire as having been born in the village.

Winterborne Stickland is sited in a winterbourne valley in the Dorset Downs, which gives rise to the first part of its name. The second part "Stickland" is derived from sticol, Old English for "steep".

== History ==
The Domesday Book of 1086 records the canons of Coutances (St Mary), Normandy, as the tenant-in-chief in 1066 with no change by 1086, after the Norman Conquest.

In the Pimperne Hundred, the village had 12 villagers, 20 smallholders, 5 slaves, 9 ploughlands, 4 lord's plough teams, 4 men's plough teams, 3.75 lord's lands, pasture of 26 by 4 furlongs (5,200 by 800 metres), woodland of 5 by 4 furlongs (1,000 by 800 metres) and 1 mill valued at 12 shillings and 5 pence.

The annual value to the lord was 15 pounds in 1086. The 37 households place Winterborne Stickland in the largest 20% of settlements recorded.

== The Church ==
The parish church of St Mary is a grade I listed building. The nave and chancel date from the 13th century, the tower from around 1500 and the south porch from the 16th century. Restoration work took place in 1892. The building is constructed of bands of stone and flint and there is a north tomb chamber. The tower is on the west end and is in two stages; it has diagonal buttresses, pinnacles and a parapet surrounded by battlements. The interior is plastered and whitewashed and has a possibly medieval ribbed wagon roof. The font, hexagonal pulpit and the panelling in the tomb chamber are eighteenth century. The screen between the chancel and tomb chamber may use parts of the fifteenth century rood screen. There are various seventeenth, eighteenth and nineteenth century monuments, and the table tomb in the tomb chamber is dedicated to Thomas and Barbara Skinner.

== Amenities ==
There is a village hall, Pamela Hambro Hall, which is used often by the community and is known for its Artsreach shows.

To the north of the village is a children's playground, tennis court, football pitch and a clubhouse. The clubhouse is well known by locals for the 'Messy Games' which usually take place every summer and/or Christmas. To the north of that is a small orchard of apple, pear and plum trees.

Many of the thatched cottages in the village are listed buildings.

There is an independently-owned pub in the centre of the village, The Crown, which was extensively restored by Ray and Tina Clayton in 1983.

The village used to have a post office which had a shop selling local food and other products. This closed in February 2015 and has since moved into the Pamela Hambro Hall on July 24, 2015. There also used to be another village store in Winterborne Stickland known as Stickland Stores, which closed in March 2006.

There is a MOT centre/garage in the village called 'Kevin's Garage'. It also used to have a petrol station which closed between 1999 and 2002.

There used to be a school in the village called 'The Dunbury School', until 2011. From 2015 to 2023, the old school building housed a nursery, which closed following safeguarding concerns from Ofsted. Since the nurseries' closure in 2023, villagers have been attempting to reopen the nursery school under village ownership. However, as of May 2025, the nursery school still sits abandoned and is yet to reopen.

The village green is a small area of greenery in Winterborne Stickland which contains the village sign, various benches and a river (the river Winterborne) flowing in the centre. The village sign was renovated and appeared in Season 2 Episode 7 of The Repair Shop in March 2018.

== Governance ==
Winterborne Stickland is part of the Winterborne North ward which elects 1 member to Dorset Council.
