= Winterborne Kingston =

Village in Dorset, England

Coordinates: 50.7786°N 2.1974°W

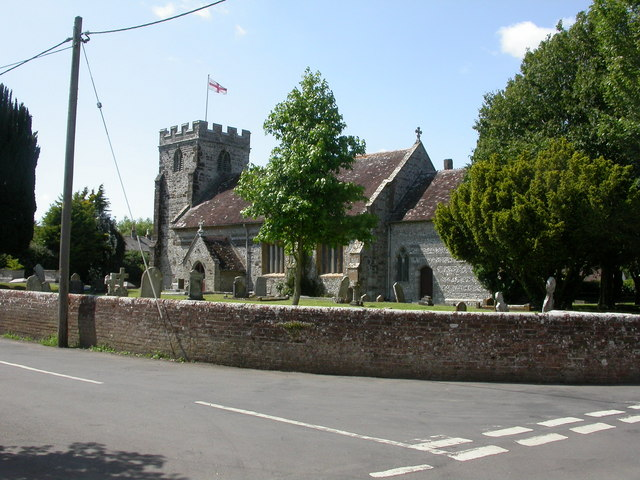
- Parish church of St Nicholas

- Location within Dorset
- Population: 643
- OS grid reference: SY862976
- Unitary authority: Dorset
- Ceremonial county: Dorset
- Region: South West
- Country: England
- Sovereign state: United Kingdom
- Post town: Blandford Forum
- Postcode district: DT11
- Police: Dorset
- Fire: Dorset and Wiltshire
- Ambulance: South Western
- UK Parliament: North Dorset

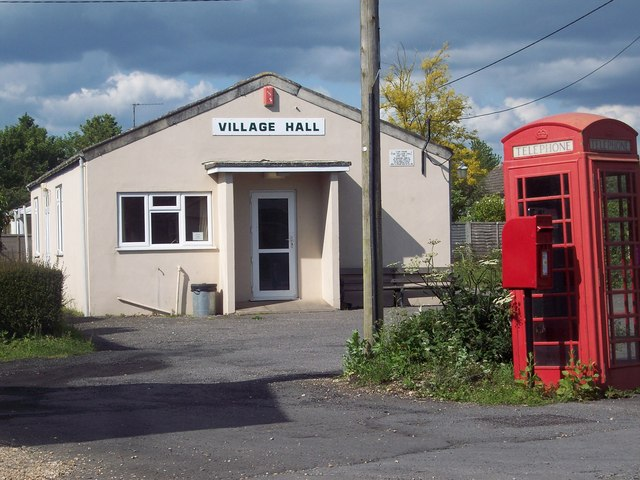
The village hall.

The old chapel at Winterborne Kingston.

Winterborne Kingston is a village and civil parish in the county of Dorset in southern England. It lies 7 miles (11 kilometres) south of the town of Blandford Forum and 2 mi (3 km) northeast of the large village of Bere Regis. It is situated in a winterbourne valley on the edge of the dip slope of the Dorset Downs. In the 2011 census the parish had 282 households and a population of 643. In 2001 it had a population of 613.

== Description ==
Winterborne Kingston consists of Kingston, which is two thirds of the western area of the parish, and Turberville (later called Abbots Court Farm) to the east. Still further east is the hamlet of Winterborne Muston. The River Winterborne which flows through the village is a tributary of the Stour. As the name Winterborne implies, the river tends to flow only in winter. Kingston means the King held land here and bourne is an old Dorset word meaning river, thus the name of the village can be translated as "King's Land by the Winter River". Amenities in the village include the Greyhound Inn, the Church of St Nicholas, Dunbury Academy School, the village hall and a recreational ground (including a children's playground).

== History ==
Icknield Street, a prehistoric route used by the Romans, passes through the village, and Roman artefacts have been found in ploughed fields.

Dorset historically had many cottage industries related to the clothing trade. Button-making (buttony) developed in the 1680s in the villages with Blandford the main centre. The 1851 census shows that many of the women in Winterborne Kingston were button makers. Most of the men worked as agricultural labourers. The farms supplied dairy products to the London markets. There were also kilns that produced lime for spreading on the land. Barley was one of the main crops, and was used in the production of malt for brewing beer in Dorsetshire and London. Other trades were carpentry, bricklaying, blacksmithing and shoemaking.

== Parish church ==
The village church is named after St Nicholas. It is in the Decorated style and faced with flint. The Victorian architect George Edmund Street remodelled the church in 1872.

== Notable residents ==
The chemist and botanist Humphry Bowen (1929–2001), author of The Flora of Dorset (2000), lived near the village during his retirement when he wrote the Flora.

== Prehistory: Duropolis and Celtic finds ==
In July 2015, archeologists discovered Iron Age remains of what is believed to be Britain's oldest planned town near Winterborne Kingston.

In 2025, archeologists described the "women-centric society" of the Durotriges, a Celtic tribe, in the area dated from about 100 B.C. to A.D. 100. Under a system called matrilocality, women remained in their ancestral communities and men migrated for marriage. The scientists had "a bit of a shock" when they identified "such a strong signature of matrilocality," said Lara Cassidy, an assistant professor in genetics at Trinity College Dublin who led the study. They found maternal lineages typical of matrilocality when they analysed the genomes of 57 Durotrigan people. It was the first time this system had been identified in European prehistory.
