= DT postcode area =

Postcode area within the United Kingdom

Dorchester
- Postcode area
- Coordinates: 50.759°N 2.486°W
- Country: United Kingdom
- Postcode area: DT
- Postcode area name: Dorchester
- Post towns: 9
- Postcode districts: 11
- Postcode sectors: 39
- Postcodes (live): 7,770
- Postcodes (total): 9,789
- Statistics as at May 2020

The DT postcode area, also known as the Dorchester postcode area, is a group of eleven postcode districts in South West England, within nine post towns. These cover much of Dorset (including Dorchester, Weymouth, Beaminster, Blandford Forum, Bridport, Lyme Regis, Portland, Sherborne and Sturminster Newton), plus very small parts of Devon and Somerset.

== Coverage ==
The approximate coverage of the postcode districts:

Postcode district	Post town	Coverage	Local authority area(s)
DT1	DORCHESTER	Dorchester, Poundbury	Dorset
DT2	DORCHESTER	Athelhampton, Puddletown, Crossways, Winfrith Newburgh, Winterborne St Martin, Puncknowle, West Bexington, Maiden Newton, Evershot, Charminster, Cerne Abbas, Buckland Newton, Pulham	Dorset
DT3	WEYMOUTH	Chickerell, Broadwey, Radipole, Osmington, Preston, Littlemoor, Portesham, Abbotsbury, Langton Herring	Dorset
DT4	WEYMOUTH	Weymouth town centre, Melcombe Regis, Westham, Wyke Regis	Dorset
DT5	PORTLAND	Fortuneswell, Easton, Southwell, Weston, The Grove	Dorset
DT6	BRIDPORT	Bridport, Melplash, Whitchurch Canonicorum, Charmouth, Burton Bradstock, Powerstock	Dorset
DT7	LYME REGIS	Lyme Regis, Uplyme, Rousdon	Dorset, East Devon
DT8	BEAMINSTER	Beaminster, Broadwindsor	Dorset
DT9	SHERBORNE	Sherborne, Milborne Port, Holwell, Longburton, Yetminster, Bradford Abbas, Charlton Horethorne	Dorset, Somerset
DT10	STURMINSTER NEWTON	Sturminster Newton, Stalbridge, Hazelbury Bryan, Marnhull, Mappowder, Stourton Caundle, Hinton St Mary	Dorset
DT11	BLANDFORD FORUM	Blandford Forum, Blandford Camp, Iwerne Courtney, Iwerne Minster, Shillingstone, Milton Abbas, Winterborne Zelston, Spetisbury	Dorset

== Map ==
DT postcode area map, showing postcode districts in red and post towns in grey text, with links to nearby BA, BH, EX, SP and TA postcode areas.

== See also ==
- List of postcode areas in the United Kingdom
- Postcodes in the United Kingdom
- Postcode Address File
