= List of hundreds in Dorset =

This is a list of hundreds in the county of Dorset, England. Between the Anglo-Saxon period and the Local Government Act 1888, the county of Dorset was divided into hundreds and boroughs (and from the mediaeval period, liberties as well). The Local Government Act 1888 replaced the hundreds and liberties with urban and rural districts, based on the sanitary districts of the Poor Law Unions which existed in parallel with the hundreds/liberties from 1834.

While numerous minor changes took place during that period, the general pattern remained stable. The subdivisions below within hundreds and liberties are the old civil parishes, into which the tithings (the original sub-divisions of the hundreds) came to be fitted. (Civil parish is used here in the sense of an "area for which a poor rate is or can be assessed", a unit which has thus been in existence de facto from the establishment of the Elizabethan Poor Law; the term itself dates from mid 19th century legislation such as the Poor Law Amendment Act 1866.)

The following are the units existing immediately prior to the act of 1834, with some additional changes noted up to the reforms of the Local Government Act 1894 and their immediate aftermath. Liberties and Boroughs are listed for completeness.

Prior to the Poor Law Amendment Act 1834, the hundreds were grouped, mostly for taxation purposes, by divisions, which were rearranged by local act of Parliament in 1830. See List of divisions in Dorset.

== Map ==
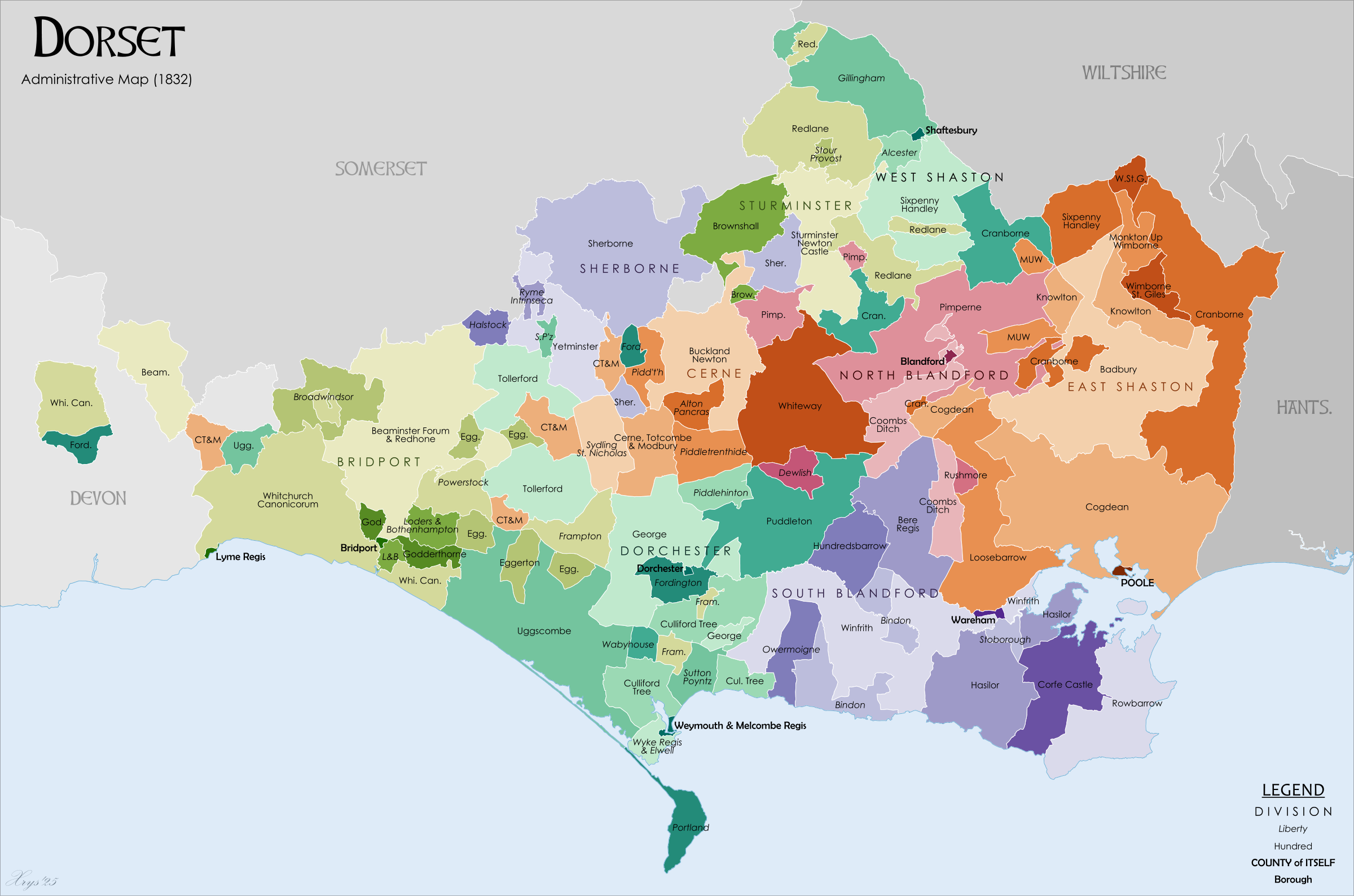

== Hundreds ==
- Badbury Hundred:

Chalbury
Gussage St Michael
Hinton Martell
Hinton Parva
Horton
More Crichel
Shapwick
Tarrant Crawford
Wimborne Minster (a borough pre-Conquest)
(Holt and Pamphill were created in 1894 from Wimborne Minster, and Colehill in 1896 from Holt)

- Beaminster Forum and Redhone Hundred:

Beaminster
Bradpole
Chedington
Chardstock (transferred to Devon 1896)
Corscombe
Mapperton
Mosterton
Netherbury
North Poorton
South Perrott
Stoke Abbott
Toller Porcorum (part)
Wambrook (transferred to Somerset 1895)

- Bere Regis Hundred:

Bere Regis
Winterborne Kingston
(Milborne Stileham was created from Bere Regis and Winterborne Kingston in 1866)

- Brownshall Hundred:

Holwell (transferred from Somerset 1844)
Lydlinch
Stalbridge
Stock Gaylard (absorbed by Lydlinch 1884)
Stourton Caundle

- Buckland Newton Hundred:

Buckland Newton
Glanvilles Wootton
Mappowder
Pulham (part)

- Cerne, Totcombe and Modbury Hundred:

Cattistock
Cerne Abbas
Godmanstone
Hilfield
Hawkchurch (part) (transferred to Devon 1896)
Nether Cerne
West Compton

- Cogdean Hundred:

Canford Magna
Charlton Marshall
Corfe Mullen
Hamworthy
Lytchett Matravers
Lytchett Minster
Poole (part of Canford Magna; borough from 1248; County of Itself 1571)
Sturminster Marshall
(Kinson, Longfleet and Parkstone were created from Canford Magna 1866)

- Coombs Ditch Hundred:

Anderson
Blandford Forum (borough from 1605)
Blandford St Mary
Bloxworth
Winterborne Clenston
Winterborne Tomson
Winterborne Whitchurch

- Corfe Castle Hundred:

Corfe Castle (borough from 1268 or 1576)

- Cranborne Hundred:

Ashmore
Belchalwell (divided between Okeford Fitzpaine and Fifehead Neville 1884)
Cranborne (part)
East Woodyates (created 1858)
Edmondsham (part)
Farnham
Hampreston (part; entire from the 1860s, when the other part was transferred from Hampshire)
Pentridge
Shillingstone
Tarrant Gunville
Tarrant Rushton
Tollard Royal (divided between Dorset and Wiltshire until the 1880s, when the Dorset part was transferred to Wiltshire)
Turnworth
West Parley
Witchampton
(Alderholt and Verwood were created from Cranborne in 1894)

- Culliford Tree Hundred:

Broadwey
Buckland Ripers
Chickerell (part)
Melcombe Regis (part of Radipole; a borough from 1268)
Osmington
Radipole
Upwey (part)
West Knighton
West Stafford
Whitcombe
Winterborne Came (part)
Winterborne Herringston
Winterborne Monkton

- Eggerton or Eggardon Hundred:

Askerswell
Hooke
Long Bredy
Powerstock (part)
Winterbourne Abbas
Wraxall

- Godderthorne Hundred:

Allington
Shipton Gorge
Walditch

- Hasilor or Hasler Hundred:

Arne
Church Knowle
East Holme
Kimmeridge
Steeple
Tyneham

- Hundredsbarrow Hundred (formerly often Barrow Hundred)

Affpuddle
Turners Puddle

- Knowlton Hundred:

Gussage All Saints
Long Crichel
Woodlands

- Loosebarrow Hundred:

Almer
Morden
Spetisbury

- Pimperne Hundred:

Bryanston
Durweston
Fifehead Neville
Hammoon
Hazelbury Bryan
Iwerne Stepleton
Langton Long Blandford
Pimperne
Stourpaine
Tarrant Hinton
Tarrant Keyneston
Tarrant Launceston
Tarrant Rawston
Winterborne Houghton
Winterborne Stickland

- Puddletown Hundred:

Athelhampton
Burleston
Milborne St Andrew (part)
Puddletown
Tincleton
Tolpuddle

- Redlane or Redland Hundred:

Buckhorn Weston
Child Okeford
East Stour
Fifehead Magdalen
Hanford (from 1858)
Iwerne Courtney
Kington Magna
Manston
Silton
Sutton Waldron
Todber
West Stour

- Rowbarrow or Rowberrow Hundred:

Langton Matravers
Studland
Swanage
Worth Matravers

- Rushmore Hundred:

Winterborne Zelston

- St George's Hundred (later often George Hundred):

Bradford Peverell
Broadmayne
Charminster
Frome Whitfield (absorbed by Dorchester Holy Trinity in 1610)
Stinsford
Stratton
Winterborne St Martin

- Sherborne Hundred:

Beer Hackett
Bishops Caundle
Bradford Abbas
Castleton
Caundle Marsh
Folke
Haydon
Holnest
Leweston (from 1858)
Lillington
Longburton
Nether Compton
North Wootton
Oborne
Over Compton
Purse Caundle
Sherborne (a borough from 1227)
Thornford
Up Cerne

- Sixpenny Handley Hundred:

Cann
Compton Abbas
East Orchard
Fontmell Magna
Iwerne Minster
Melbury Abbas
Sixpenny Handley
West Orchard

- Sturminster Newton Hundred:

Hinton St Mary
Margaret Marsh
Marnhull
Okeford Fitzpaine
Sturminster Newton

- Tollerford Hundred:

Chilfrome
East Chelborough
Evershot
Frome St Quintin
Frome Vauchurch
Maiden Newton
Melbury Sampford
Rampisham
Toller Fratrum
Toller Porcorum (part)
West Chelborough
Wynford Eagle

- Uggescombe Hundred:

Abbotsbury
Chilcombe
Fleet
Hawkchurch (part)
Kingston Russell
Langton Herring
Littlebredy
Litton Cheney
Portesham
Puncknowle
Swyre
Weymouth (part of Wyke Regis; a borough from 1252)
Winterbourne Steepleton

- Up Wimborne or Monkton Up Wimborne Hundred

Chettle
Cranborne (part)
Tarrant Monkton

- Whitchurch Canonicorum Hundred:

Burstock
Catherston Leweston
Charmouth
Chideock
Lyme Regis
Marshwood
Pilsdon
Stanton St Gabriel
Stockland (part) (transferred to Devon 1844)
Symondsbury
Thorncombe (transferred to Devon 1844 and back to Dorset 1896)
Whitchurch Canonicorum
Wootton Fitzpaine

- Whiteway Hundred:

Cheselbourne
Hilton
Ibberton
Melcombe Horsey
Milton Abbas
Stoke Wake
Woolland

- Wimborne St Giles Hundred:

Wimborne All Saints (absorbed by Wimborne St Giles 1732)
Wimborne St Giles
West Woodyates (created 1858)

- Winfrith Hundred:

Coombe Keynes
East Lulworth
East Stoke
Moreton (part)
Owermoigne (later a separate liberty)
Poxwell
Warmwell
Watercombe (from 1858)
Winfrith Newburgh
Woodsford

- Yetminster Hundred:

Batcombe
Clifton Maybank
Melbury Bubb
Melbury Osmond
Yetminster
(Chetnole and Leigh were created from Yetminster in 1866)

== Liberties ==
- Alton Pancras
- Bindon Liberty
- Broadwindsor
- Corfe Castle
- Dewlish Liberty
- Fordington Liberty
- Frampton Liberty
- Gillingham Liberty
- Halstock
- Loders and Bothenhampton Liberty
- Owermoigne
- Piddlehinton
- Piddletrenthide Liberty
- Portland
- Powerstock Liberty:
- Ryme Intrinseca
- Stoborough
- Stour Provost
- Sutton Poyntz Liberty
- Sydling St Nicholas
- Waybayouse or Wabyhouse Liberty
- Wyke Regis and Elwell Liberty

For full details see List of liberties in Dorset

== Boroughs ==
- Bridport
- Blandford Forum
- Dorchester
- Lyme Regis
- Shaftesbury
- Wareham
- Weymouth and Melcombe Regis

== Sources ==
- Boswell, Edward, 1833: The Civil Division of the County of Dorset (published on CD by Archive CD Books Ltd, 1992)
- Hutchins, John, History of Dorset, vols 1-4 (3rd ed 1861-70; reprinted by EP Publishing, Wakefield, 1973)
- Mills, A. D., 1977, 1980, 1989: Place Names of Dorset, parts 1-3. English Place Name Society: Survey of English Place Names vols LII, LIII and 59/60
