= Yetminster Hundred =

Historical division of Dorset, England

Coordinates: 50.8951°N 2.5769°W

Yetminster Hundred was a hundred in the county of Dorset, England, containing the following parishes:

- Batcombe
- Clifton Maybank
- Melbury Bubb
- Melbury Osmond
- Yetminster
- (Chetnole and Leigh were created from Yetminster in 1866)

== See also ==
List of hundreds in Dorset

== Sources ==
- Boswell, Edward, 1833: The Civil Division of the County of Dorset (published on CD by Archive CD Books Ltd, 1992)
- Hutchins, John, History of Dorset, vols 1-4 (3rd ed 1861–70; reprinted by EP Publishing, Wakefield, 1973)
- Mills, A. D., 1977, 1980, 1989: Place Names of Dorset, parts 1–3. English Place Name Society: Survey of English Place Names vols LII, LIII and 59/60
