= Cerne, Totcombe and Modbury Hundred =

Historical division of Dorset, England

Coordinates: 50.844°N 2.521°W

Cerne, Totcombe and Modbury Hundred was a hundred in the county of Dorset, England. Some of its tithings and parishes were exclaves which indicates that its ancient manors were likely the possessions of one related family who received them during the reign of William the Conqueror. The hundred contained the following parishes:

Cattistock
Cerne Abbas
Godmanstone
Hilfield
Hawkchurch (part) (transferred to Devon 1896)
Nether Cerne
West Compton

== See also ==
- List of hundreds in Dorset
