= White Mill, Sturminster Marshall =

Historic watermill in Sturminster Marshall, Dorset, England

White Mill
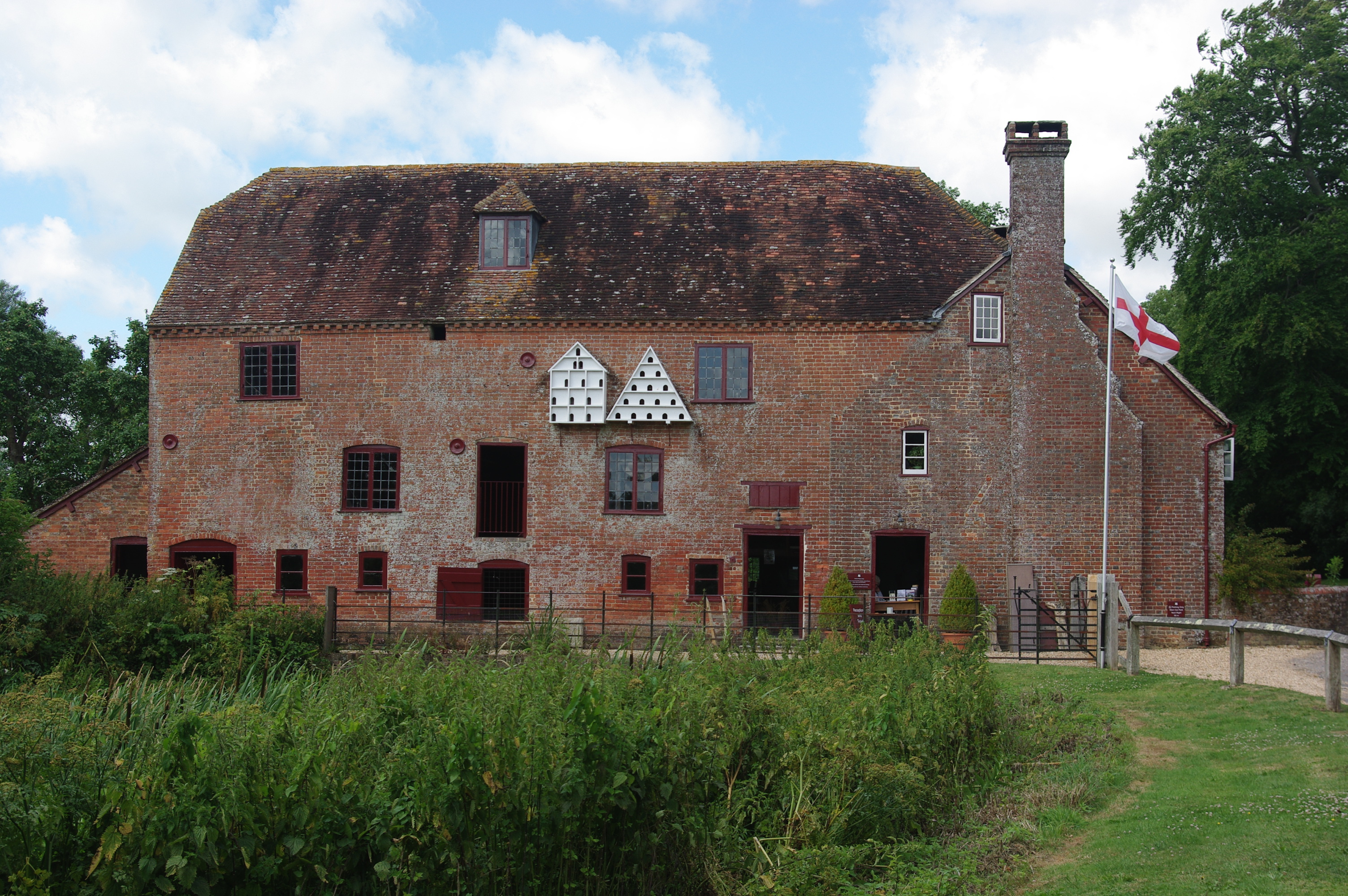
- Type: Watermill
- Location: Sturminster Marshall
- Coordinates: 50°48′18″N 2°03′40″W
- OS grid reference: ST9579100617
- Area: Dorset
- Built for: Milling corn
- Rebuilt: 1776
- Owner: National Trust

Listed Building – Grade II
- Official name: White Mill and Mill House
- Designated: 02 June 1982
- Reference no.: 1120206

White Mill is an 18th-century water powered corn mill near Sturminster Marshall in Dorset on the River Stour which is in the care of the National Trust. The first record of a mill on the site is from Domesday Book; the current watermill was rebuilt in 1776 and extensively repaired in 1994. It still retains its original elm and applewood machinery though this can no longer be used.

== Description ==
The mill and house are both built of brick with tiled roofs. The mill house has two stories whist the mill has three with an attic. The house has a single story lean-to extension and a timber porch. The machinery and mill stones remain but the two water wheels are no longer present.

== History ==
The present mill is thought to be on the site of an earlier one, probably one of those mentioned in Domesday Book. The current mill was rebuilt in 1776 on older foundations. The tenancy of the mill was the held by successive members of the Joyce family. The mill worked under water power until 1866 when a severe winter flood caused damage that was deemed beyond economic repair. The miller at the time was also a baker and he converted half of the mill to run from a portable steam engine to supply his bakery with flour. The last miller retired at the end of the 19th-century and the mill was not used again.

== Preservation ==
The mill and mill house were designated a Grade II listed building in 1982. The mill is in the care of the National Trust which opens it to the public. Conservation work was carried out in 1994. The boundary wall to the mill is listed separately, also at Grade II.
