= St George's Hundred =

St George's Hundred may refer to the following administrative divisions:

- St. George's Hundred, Delaware, United States
- St George's Hundred, Dorset, England
