= Alton Pancras =

Village in Dorset, England

Coordinates: 50.8207°N 2.4278°W

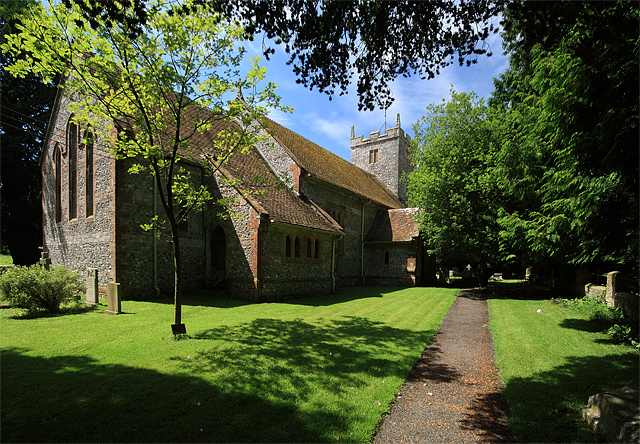
- Alton Pancras parish church

- Location within Dorset
- Population: 175
- OS grid reference: ST699022
  - London: 130 miles (209 km)
- Civil parish: Alton Pancras
- Unitary authority: Dorset
- Ceremonial county: Dorset
- Region: South West
- Country: England
- Sovereign state: United Kingdom
- Post town: DORCHESTER
- Postcode district: DT2
- Dialling code: 01300
- Police: Dorset
- Fire: Dorset and Wiltshire
- Ambulance: South Western
- UK Parliament: West Dorset

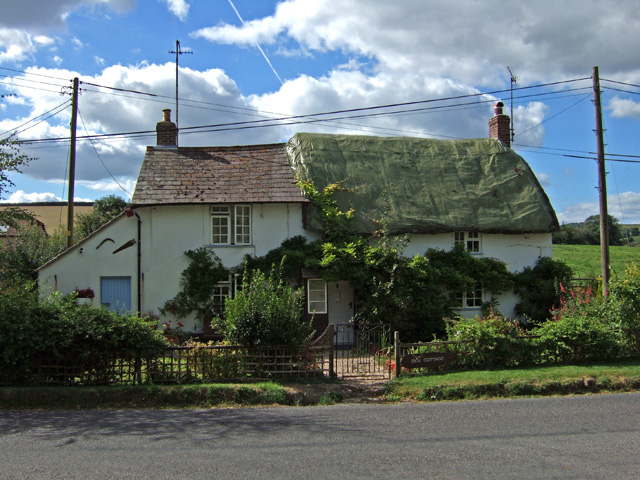
Cottage in Alton Pancras

Alton Pancras is a small village and civil parish in Dorset, England. In the 2011 census the civil parish had a population of 175.

The village church is dedicated to Saint Pancras, which provides part of the village name. The parish was formerly a liberty, containing only the parish itself.

== History ==
Evidence of prehistoric human activity within the parish includes two round barrows on the hills to the east of the village (one on West Hill and one on Church Hill), the remains of 'Celtic' fields and strip lynchets on many of the surrounding hills, and a possible settlement just south of the summit of Church Hill. Dating is not definite but the 'Celtic' fields were probably in use between the Bronze Age and the end of the Romano-British period. The possible settlement is probably Romano-British. Subsequent cultivation, particularly in modern times, has destroyed much of the evidence.

The village itself was likely first settled by Saxons during the expansion of the Kingdom of Wessex. The name of the village was then Awultune, meaning in West Saxon 'village at the source of the river' (the River Piddle). The village was previously two separate settlements: Barcombe and Alton, both of which had their own open field system. In 1086 in the Domesday Book the village was recorded as Altone. It had 26 households, was in Cerne, Totcombe and Modbury Hundred, and the tenant-in-chief was the Bishop of Salisbury. Local tradition believes that after conversion to Christianity, the village name incorporated the little-known St Pancras and that by the time of the Battle of Agincourt (1415), was known as Aulton Pancras. However, in Christopher Saxton's map of 1575 it is still known as 'Ælton' and in John Speed's map of 1610, it is listed as 'Alton'. In a later 1760 map by Emanuel Bowen, the village is listed as 'Alton Pancras'.

The current church was restored in the 19th century after an earlier Norman church was near collapse. All that remains of the old church is the 15th-century tower and a Norman arch. The church organ used to be a fairground organ. The floor tiles were created by Poole Pottery.

== Governance ==
For elections to the Parliament of the United Kingdom, Alton Pancras is in the West Dorset parliamentary constituency.

In local government, Alton Pancras is in the Dorset unitary authority. For elections to Dorset Council it is in the Chalk Valleys electoral ward.

At the parish level – the lowest tier of local government – Alton Pancras is one of three parishes governed by Piddle Valley Group Parish Council. The other parishes are Piddlehinton and Piddletrenthide.

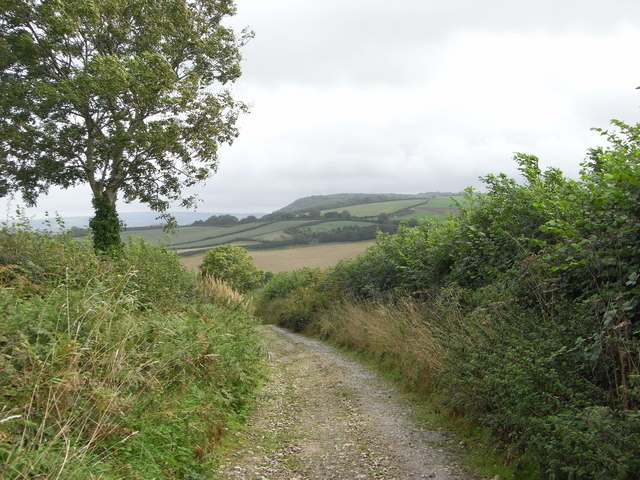
Barnes's Lane on the northern boundary of the parish, looking east toward Church Hill

== Geography ==
Alton Pancras civil parish covers 920 hectares (2,280 acres) at the head of the valley of the River Piddle. The valley is on the dip slope of the Dorset Downs and drains from north to south. Several small side combes extend east and west. In the east the parish includes part of a tributary valley at Watcombe Bottom, north of Plush, and in the northeast it extends north of the escarpment to Alton Common in the Blackmore Vale. The underlying geology of the parish is mostly chalk, except for the Alton Common extension, which is on greensand, gault and Kimmeridge clay. Alton Pancras village is sited in the valley near the source of the River Piddle at an altitude of about 125 metres (410 ft). The altitude of the parish is between about 255 metres (837 ft) at its highest point on the hills to the west, to about 110 metres (360 ft) at its lowest point where the river leaves the parish in the south. The broadcaster and agriculturist Ralph Wightman, who was born and lived in the nearby village of Piddletrenthide, described the hills surrounding the village as "very much in the centre of Dorset". All of Alton Pancras parish is within the Dorset National Landscape area. Horse Close Wood on Alton Common is a Woodland Trust wood, though it is not open to the public.

Alton Pancras village is situated on the B3143 road, which connects it to the county town of Dorchester 9 miles (14 km) to the south. Other local travel links include Maiden Newton railway station 7 miles (11 km) to the south-west, and Bournemouth Airport 26 miles (42 km) to the east.

== Demography ==
In the 2011 census Alton Pancras civil parish had 72 dwellings, 71 households and a population of 175. The average age of parish residents was 42, compared to 39.3 for England as a whole. 16.0% of residents were age 65 or over, compared to 16.4% for England as a whole.
