= Sturminster =

Sturminster may refer to:

- Sturminster Newton
- Sturminster Marshall
