= Cranborne Hundred =

Former administrative division in Dorset, England

Coordinates: 50.919°N 1.922°W

Cranborne Hundred was a hundred in the county of Dorset, England, containing the following parishes:

- Ashmore
- Belchalwell (divided between Okeford Fitzpaine and Fifehead Neville 1884)
- Cranborne (part)
- East Woodyates (created 1858)
- Edmondsham (part)
- Farnham
- Hampreston (part; entire from the 1860s, when the other part was transferred from Hampshire)
- Pentridge
- Shillingstone
- Tarrant Gunville
- Tarrant Rushton
- Tollard Royal (divided between Dorset and Wiltshire until the 1880s, when the Dorset part was transferred to Wiltshire)
- Turnworth
- West Parley
- Witchampton

(Alderholt and Verwood were created from Cranborne in 1894)

== See also ==
- List of hundreds in Dorset

== Sources ==
- Boswell, Edward, 1833: The Civil Division of the County of Dorset (published on CD by Archive CD Books Ltd, 1992)
- Hutchins, John, History of Dorset, vols 1-4 (3rd ed 1861–70; reprinted by EP Publishing, Wakefield, 1973)
- Mills, A. D., 1977, 1980, 1989: Place Names of Dorset, parts 1–3. English Place Name Society: Survey of English Place Names vols LII, LIII and 59/60
