= William Domett =

Royal Navy Admiral (1752–1828)

Admiral Sir William Domett GCB
- Born: 1752; Hawkchurch, Devon
- Died: 19 May 1828 (aged 75–76); Westhay House, Hawkchurch, Devon
- Military career
- Allegiance: Great Britain; United Kingdom
- Branch: Royal Navy
- Service years: 1769–1814
- Rank: Admiral
- Commands: Ceres; HMS Queen; HMS Champion; HMS Pomone; HMS Salisbury; HMS London; HMS Pegasus; HMS Romney; HMS Royal George; HMS Ville de Paris; Plymouth Command
- Conflicts: American Revolutionary War; First Battle of Ushant; Battle of Cape Henry; Battle of the Chesapeake; Battle of St. Kitts; Battle of the Saintes; Great Siege of Gibraltar; Battle of Cape Spartel; French Revolutionary Wars; Glorious First of June; Battle of Groix; Battle of Copenhagen; Napoleonic Wars
- Awards: Knight Grand Cross of the Order of the Bath

Admiral Sir William Domett, GCB (1752 – 19 May 1828) was a Royal Navy officer who saw extensive service during the American Revolutionary, French Revolutionary and Napoleonic Wars. Throughout his career, Domett was under the patronage of Alexander Hood, later Lord Bridport. During his service Domett was appointed as flag captain by several admirals, and saw action numerous times in this capacity, including seven years in command of HMS Royal George. He went on to be First Naval Lord and then Commander-in-Chief, Plymouth during the closing stages of the Napoleonic Wars. Later in life, ill-health forced early retirement and Domett retired to his country estate in Hawkchurch, Devon, close to Lord Bridport's estates.

== Early career ==
Little is known of Domett's birth or upbring, although it is thought he was born in the Hawkchurch, Devon region in 1752. The first solid record of him available was in 1769, when he joined the Navy and appears on the muster books of HMS Quebec, under the patronage of Captain Alexander Hood. Domett spent the next five and a half years in the Mediterranean Sea, leaving Quebec in 1772 and joining HMS Scorpion. In 1775, Domett was briefly attached to HMS Marlborough before joining HMS Surprize on the Newfoundland Station at the start of the American Revolutionary War.

At the outbreak of the Revolutionary War, Domett was in Surprise when she was at the relief of the Siege of Quebec. As reward for his service in this operations, Admiral John Montagu promoted Domett to lieutenant aboard HMS Romney. Less than a year later, Montagu returned to Britain and brought Domett with him, seconding him to Hood's service. Serving aboard Hood's ship HMS Robust, Domett was in action at the First Battle of Ushant in 1778. He held the rank of lieutenant from 27 December 1778.

Three years later, Domett was still aboard Robust, and in her took part in the Battle of Cape Henry. A few months later, Domett had moved to HMS Invincible, under Captain Charles Saxton, and was engaged at the Battle of the Chesapeake. Following this action, Domett was again taken from his side to be the aide of an admiral, Admiral Sir Samuel Hood. Domett acted as his signal lieutenant in HMS Barfleur and in this capacity participated at the Battle of St. Kitts and the Battle of the Saintes. For his services in these actions, Domett became first lieutenant and when, a few months later, Barfleur captured four enemy ships in an action, Domett was given command of the small prize brig Ceres, which he safely brought back to Britain. On his return, Domett was made a post captain.

The Relief of Gibraltar, 11 October 1782, by Richard Paton, at which Domett saw action

As a captain, Domett was immediately requested by Alexander Hood to be his flag captain in HMS Queen. On board this ship Domett saw out the war, joining Lord Howe's fleet which relieved the Great Siege of Gibraltar and later fought at the Battle of Cape Spartel. The end of the war saw Domett, with many other officers, unemployed and on half-pay.

== French Revolutionary and Napoleonic Wars ==
Domett's close ties with the Hood family meant that he had good connections, and so in 1786, Domett was given the 24-gun HMS Champion at Leith. Several years later, Domett moved to HMS Pomone and conducted a year long cruise down the coast of West Africa and through the West Indies. On his return, Domett was requested by Admiral Mark Milbanke for service in Newfoundland on HMS Salisbury but in 1790 Domett was back in Britain as Hood's captain on HMS London during the Spanish armament. When this emergency died down, Domett took command of HMS Pegasus and then later he took command of HMS Romney, a ship he had served aboard as a lieutenant, before returning to Hood's service as captain of HMS Royal George in 1803 at the outbreak of the Napoleonic Wars.

Royal George was second flagship of the Channel Fleet, and Lord Howe its overall commander. In 1794, Lord Howe embarked on the Atlantic campaign of May 1794, which ended in the Glorious First of June, at which Domett and Royal George were heavily engaged and the ship badly damaged. Domett remained in command when Hood became Viscount Bridport and served under him again the following year at the Battle of Groix. Domett did not leave Royal George until 1800, the seven years he spent in command being a record in the Channel Fleet at the time.

When Lord St Vincent took command of the Channel Fleet, Domett was initially sceptical of his new commander, but the two soon developed a close working partnership and Domett even retained the flag captaincy over the claims of Sir Thomas Troubridge. When St Vincent stepped down a year later, his replacement Admiral Hyde Parker initially transferred Domett to HMS Belleisle but later changed his mind and made Domett his flag captain on HMS London for the expedition to Copenhagen.

At the Battle of Copenhagen, Domett disagreed with Parker's tactical plan and persuaded him to change it, resulting in the attack by Nelson at which the Danish fleet was destroyed. Parker did not credit Domett in the dispatch to the Admiralty and Domett was furious, writing an angry letter to Lord Bridport on the matter. When Nelson replaced Parker, he retained Domett again and when he in turn was replaced by Admiral William Cornwallis, Domett was again flag captain, aboard HMS Ville de Paris.

== Retirement ==
The Peace of Amiens saw Domett briefly on the Irish station before rejoining Cornwallis at the outbreak of hostilities. On 23 April 1804, Domett was made a rear-admiral but refused a seagoing commission due to a sudden deterioration of his health. Instead, he served as one of the commissioners for revising the civil affairs of the navy. Domett was rapidly promoted during the next eight years but was unable to rejoin the fleet at sea, his health remaining too weak for the strain of such service. Instead, Domett joined the Board of Admiralty in May 1808 and continued to serve in an administrative capacity, his frequent bouts of ill-health making service of any kind difficult. He became First Naval Lord in the Liverpool ministry in March 1812. Promoted to vice-admiral on 25 October 1809, he retired from the Admiralty Board in October 1813 and became Commander-in-Chief, Plymouth but he resigned fifteen months later due to a recurring foot injury which had rendered him lame.

Domett was made a Knight Commander of the Order of the Bath on 2 January 1815, promoted to full admiral on 12 August 1819 and advanced to Knight Grand Cross of the Order of the Bath on 16 May 1820. Domett settled on his estate in Hawkchurch, Devon near the home of Lord Bridport, who had died in 1814. He never married and had no children, but was highly esteemed in the service as a consummate sailor and brave fighter whose extremely long and dedicated sea service had earned him an excellent reputation in the Navy. He died suddenly in 1828 and was buried in the local church.

== Sources ==
- "Domett, William". Oxford Dictionary of National Biography (online ed.). Oxford University Press. 2004. doi:10.1093/ref:odnb/7787. (Subscription, Wikipedia Library access or UK public library membership required.)
- Rodger, N.A.M. (1979). The Admiralty. Offices of State. Lavenham: T. Dalton Ltd. ISBN 0900963948.

Military offices
Preceded by Sir Richard Bickerton	First Naval Lord; 1812–1813	Succeeded by Sir Joseph Yorke
Preceded by Sir Robert Calder	Commander-in-Chief, Plymouth; 1813–1815	Succeeded by Sir John Duckworth
