= Cogdean Hundred =

Hundred in Dorset, England

Coordinates: 50.760°N 2.016°W

Cogdean Hundred was a hundred in the county of Dorset, England, containing the following parishes:

- Canford Magna
- Charlton Marshall
- Corfe Mullen
- Hamworthy
- Lytchett Matravers
- Lytchett Minster
- Poole (part of Canford Magna; borough from 1248; County of itself from 1571)
- Sturminster Marshall
- (Kinson, Longfleet and Parkstone were created from Canford Magna 1866)

== See also ==
- List of hundreds in Dorset

== Sources ==
- Boswell, Edward, 1833: The Civil Division of the County of Dorset (published on CD by Archive CD Books Ltd, 1992)
- Hutchins, John, History of Dorset, vols 1-4 (3rd ed 1861–70; reprinted by EP Publishing, Wakefield, 1973)
- Mills, A. D., 1977, 1980, 1989: Place Names of Dorset, parts 1–3. English Place Name Society: Survey of English Place Names vols LII, LIII and 59/60
