= List of divisions in Dorset =

The county of Dorset, is and has been divided in many ways.

- List of electoral wards in Dorset - these authorities are divided into wards for electoral purposes.
- List of boroughs in Dorset - boroughs were also divided into wards for electoral purposes.
- List of sanitary districts in Dorset
- List of parliamentary constituencies in Dorset
- List of civil parishes in Dorset
- List of hundreds in Dorset
- List of liberties in Dorset
- List of places in Dorset
- List of settlements in Dorset by population

== See also ==
- Dorset Council
- Bournemouth, Christchurch and Poole Council
