= Hassler (disambiguation) =

Hassler, Hasler or Hašler may refer to:

- Hassler, a German surname and its variants
- Hasler AG a Swiss telecommunications company
- Asteroid 37939 Hašler
- Hasler Hundred, former hundred in the county of Dorset, England
- Hasler Series, British national club championship in the sport of marathon canoeing
- Hassler (vessel), 1870 iron-hulled steamship
- NOAAS Ferdinand R. Hassler (S 250), 2009 coastal mapping ship
