= Corfe Castle (disambiguation) =

Corfe Castle is an ancient castle in Dorset, England.

It has given its name to:

- Corfe Castle (village), a nearby village
- Corfe Castle (UK Parliament constituency)
- Corfe Castle Hundred, a hundred containing the parish
- Corfe Castle railway station, located in the village
