= Wyndham's Oak =

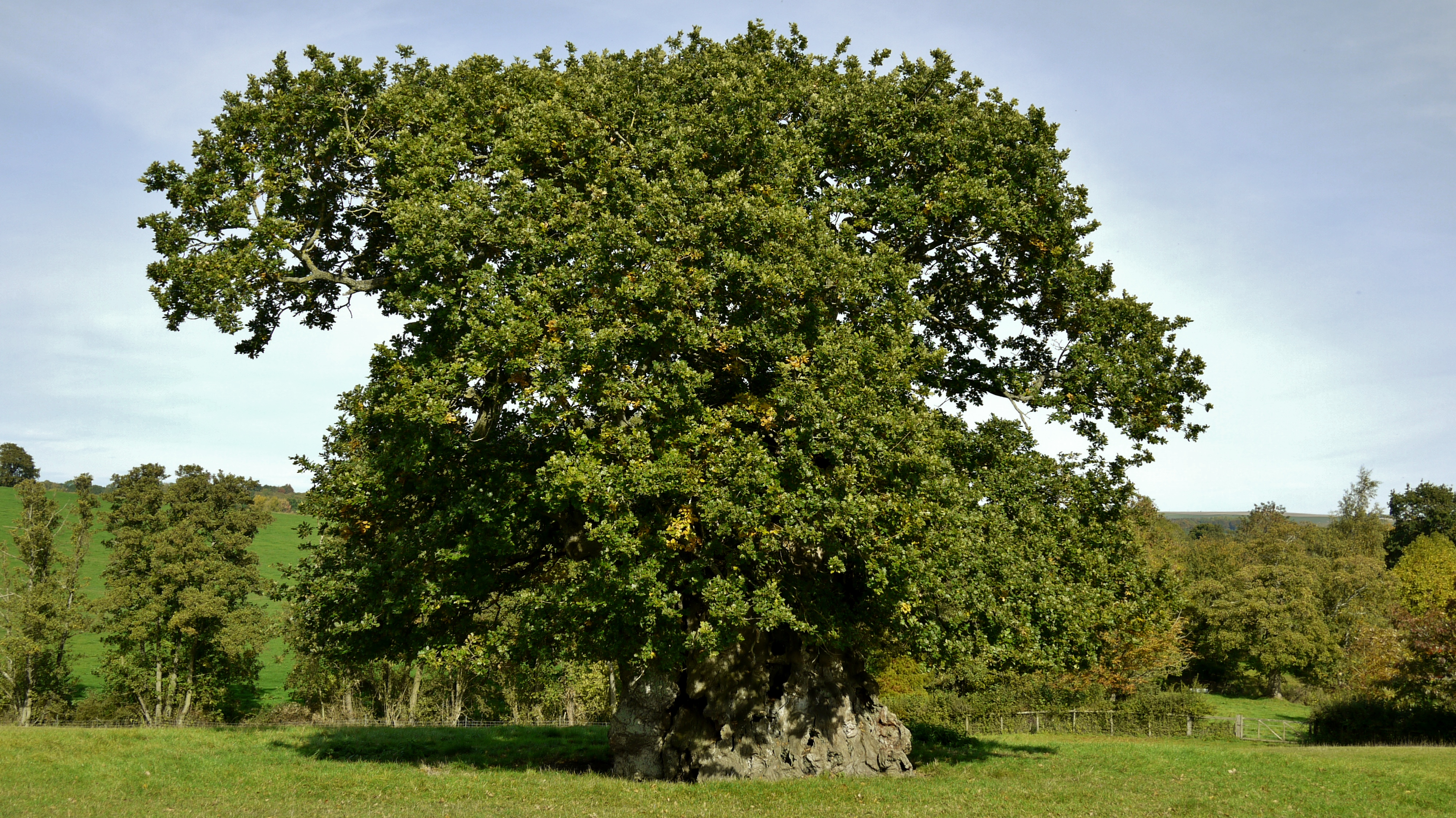
- The oak in October 2018
- Interactive map of Wyndham's Oak
- Species: Pedunculate oak (Quercus robur)
- Location: Silton, Dorset, England
- Coordinates: 51.063153°N 2.309385°W
- Custodian: [In private ownership]

Wyndham's Oak (sometimes Judge Wyndham's Oak and also known as the Silton Oak or stumpy Silton) is an historic pedunculate oak (Quercus robur) tree in Silton, Dorset, England. It was one of a number of oaks that historically marked the boundary of between Selwood Forest and Gillingham Forest, a medieval hunting ground.

The tree is up to 1,000 years old, and is the oldest tree in the county of Dorset. As of April 2008, its trunk measured 38 feet (12 m) in circumference—the greatest of any tree in the country—and the bole was 26 feet (7.9 m) high. It is named after Sir Hugh Wyndham, a Judge of the Common Pleas who used to sit in its shade to relax while contemplating cases, and was reputedly used as a gallows from which to hang rebels convicted of participation in the Monmouth Rebellion.

It was the subject of an engraving during the reign of George III, and a drawing by the artist Mark Frith, which was commissioned by publisher Felix Dennis and bequeathed by him to the charity he founded, the Heart of England Forest.

It was one of ten candidates in the Woodland Trust's poll to find the "England's Tree of the Year 2018".

As of September 2019, the ground where the tree stands is part of a privately owned farm.
