= Silton =

Village in Dorset, England

Coordinates: 51.0631°N 2.3127°W

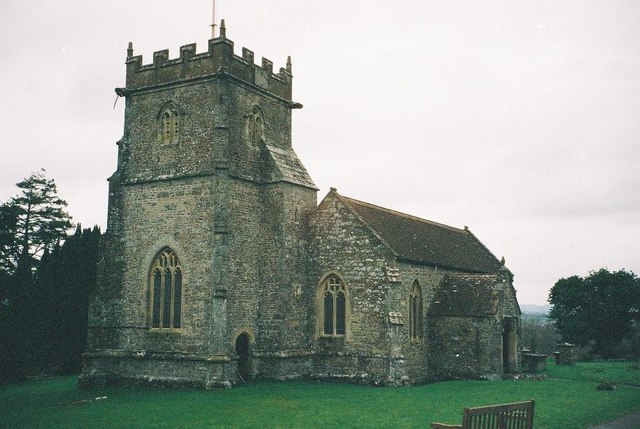
- Parish church of St Nicholas, Silton

- Location within Dorset
- Population: 123
- OS grid reference: ST783293
- Unitary authority: Dorset
- Ceremonial county: Dorset
- Region: South West
- Country: England
- Sovereign state: United Kingdom
- Post town: Gillingham
- Postcode district: SP8
- Police: Dorset
- Fire: Dorset and Wiltshire
- Ambulance: South Western
- UK Parliament: North Dorset

Silton is a small village and civil parish in north Dorset, England, situated in the Blackmore Vale four miles (six kilometres) northwest of Gillingham. In the 2011 census, the civil parish had 57 households and a population of 123.

In 1086, Silton was recorded in the Domesday Book as Seltone; it had 16 households, 11.5 ploughlands, 28 acres (11 hectares) of meadow and 4 mills. It was in the hundred of Gillingham and the tenant-in-chief was William of Falaise. This original settlement was near the church, on a low ridge between the River Stour and a minor tributary to the southwest.

Silton was for many years the country residence of Sir Hugh Wyndham (1602–1684), whose memorial by the sculptor Jan van Nost is in the parish church of St Nicholas. Wyndham's Oak, an historic tree named after Wyndham, stands nearby.

Henry Harris farmed at Manor Farm in Silton, and represented the parish on the Shaftesbury Rural District Council from 1910-13. The Harris family still farms at Manor Farm today.
