= Manston, Dorset =

Village and civil parish in Dorset, England

Coordinates: 50.9390°N 2.2651°W

Manston
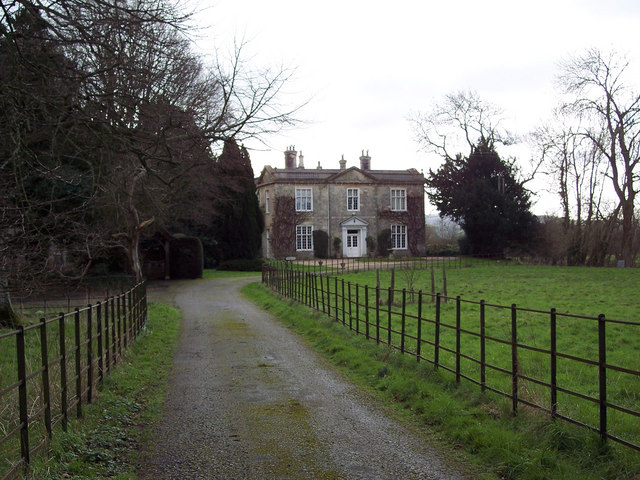
- Manston House

- Location within Dorset
- Population: 140
- OS grid reference: ST815155
- Unitary authority: Dorset
- Ceremonial county: Dorset
- Region: South West
- Country: England
- Sovereign state: United Kingdom
- Post town: Sturminster Newton
- Postcode district: DT10
- Police: Dorset
- Fire: Dorset and Wiltshire
- Ambulance: South Western
- UK Parliament: North Dorset

Manston is a small village and civil parish in the county of Dorset in southern England, lying next to the River Stour in the Blackmore Vale, two miles (three kilometres) east of Sturminster Newton. The geology of the parish consists mostly of Kimmeridge clay, with a thin strip of Corallian limestone in the west.

== History ==
In 1086 in the Domesday Book, Manston was recorded as Manestone; it had 19 households, 8 ploughlands, 25 acres (10 hectares) of meadow and 2 mills. It was in the hundred of Gillingham and tenant-in-chief was Waleran the hunter.

The parish church of St Nicholas has a 13th-century chancel, 14th-century nave and 15th-century west tower. The first legal cremation in Britain took place at Manston House in 1883, carried out by Captain Thomas Hanham.

In 2013 the estimated population of the parish was 140. Northwood Farm in Manston is a former dairy farm that converted to a grain farm. It grows oats, wheat and fava beans, and has received the Biocyclic Vegan Standard.
