= St George's Hundred, Dorset =

Historical division of Dorset, England

Coordinates: 50.735°N 2.468°W

St George's Hundred, later often George Hundred, was a hundred (administrative division) in the county of Dorset, England, containing the parishes of Bradford Peverell, Broadmayne, Charminster, Frome Whitfield (absorbed by Dorchester Holy Trinity in 1610), Stinsford, Stratton and Winterborne St Martin.

== See also ==
- List of hundreds in Dorset

== Sources ==
- Boswell, Edward, 1833: The Civil Division of the County of Dorset (published on CD by Archive CD Books Ltd, 1992)
- Hutchins, John, History of Dorset, vols 1-4 (3rd ed 1861–70; reprinted by EP Publishing, Wakefield, 1973)
- Mills, A. D., 1977, 1980, 1989: Place Names of Dorset, parts 1–3. English Place Name Society: Survey of English Place Names vols LII, LIII and 59/60
