= Hasler Hundred =

Historical division of Dorset, England

Coordinates: 50.6176°N 2.1178°W

Hasler Hundred or Hasilor Hundred was a hundred in the county of Dorset, England, containing the following parishes:

- Arne
- Church Knowle
- East Holme
- Kimmeridge
- Steeple
- Tyneham

== See also ==
- List of hundreds in Dorset

== Sources ==
- Boswell, Edward, 1833: The Civil Division of the County of Dorset (published on CD by Archive CD Books Ltd, 1992)
- Hutchins, John, History of Dorset, vols 1-4 (3rd ed 1861–70; reprinted by EP Publishing, Wakefield, 1973)
- Mills, A. D., 1977, 1980, 1989: Place Names of Dorset, parts 1–3. English Place Name Society: Survey of English Place Names vols LII, LIII and 59/60
