= Mappowder =

Village and civil parish in Dorset, England

Coordinates: 50.8535°N 2.3784°W

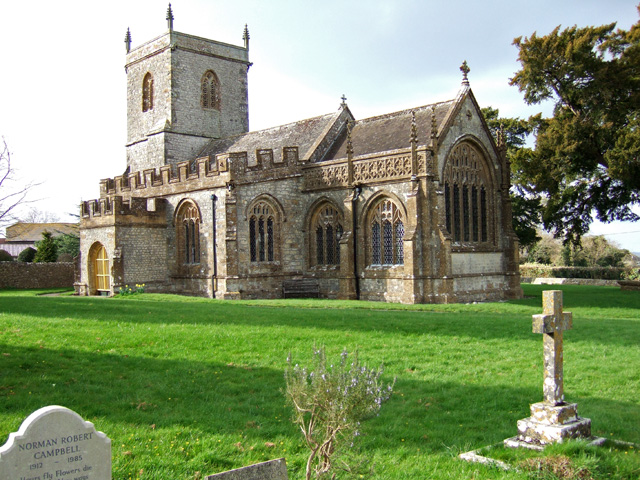
- Parish church of St Peter and St Paul

- Location within Dorset
- Population: 166
- OS grid reference: ST735061
- Unitary authority: Dorset
- Ceremonial county: Dorset
- Region: South West
- Country: England
- Sovereign state: United Kingdom
- Post town: Sturminster Newton
- Postcode district: DT10
- Police: Dorset
- Fire: Dorset and Wiltshire
- Ambulance: South Western
- UK Parliament: North Dorset

Mappowder is a village and civil parish in the county of Dorset in southern England. The parish lies approximately 9 miles (14 kilometres) southeast of the town of Sherborne and covers about 1,900 acres (770 hectares) at an elevation of 75 to 160 metres (250 to 520 feet). It is sited on Corallian limestone soil at the southern edge of the Blackmore Vale, close to the northern scarp face of the Dorset Downs. In the 2011 census the parish had 71 dwellings, 69 households and a population of 166.

The village name comes from mapuldor, Old English for 'maple tree'. In 1086 in the Domesday Book Mappowder was recorded as Mapledre and appears in four entries; it was in Buckland Newton Hundred, had 33.3 households and a total taxable value of 8.3 geld units.

The church, dedicated to St Peter & St Paul, is Perpendicular and was built in the late 15th and 16th centuries. However, it includes features remaining from an earlier 12th-century church. The chancel was extended in 1868 by the Wingfield Digby family of Sherborne Castle, who owned the village in Victorian times.

Mappowder was once the home of the Coker family, who built a large mansion here in 1654, although this was pulled down in the mid-eighteenth century. The building which occupies the site now, Mappowder Court, is mostly of mid-eighteenth-century origin, with some earlier remnants. The stone gateposts at the entrance remain from the original Coker manor; these are topped by carved human heads which in 1905 Sir Frederick Treves described as "Blackamoors" these being "those indefinite natives of the tropics having been used for the crest of the Coker family." In 1559 Henry Coker (c.1528–1596) was member of parliament for the constituency of Shaftesbury. Mappowder Court is listed by English Heritage as Grade II*, with the gateposts and courtyard walls as Grade II.

Novelist and short story writer Theodore Francis Powys lived in Mappowder for the last 13 years of his life; he died and was buried here in 1953.
