= Kington Magna =

Village in Dorset, England

Coordinates: 51.0076°N 2.3364°W

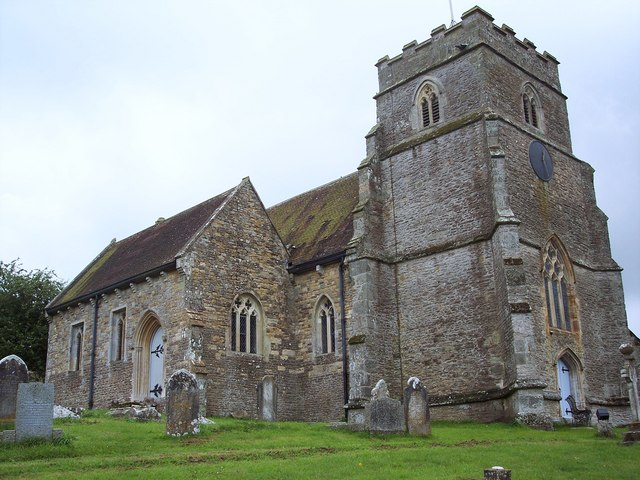
- All Saints' Church, Kington Magna

- Location within Dorset
- Population: 389 (2011)
- OS grid reference: ST765232
- Unitary authority: Dorset
- Ceremonial county: Dorset
- Region: South West
- Country: England
- Sovereign state: United Kingdom
- Post town: GILLINGHAM
- Postcode district: SP8
- Dialling code: 01747
- Police: Dorset
- Fire: Dorset and Wiltshire
- Ambulance: South Western
- UK Parliament: North Dorset

Kington Magna is a village and civil parish in the Blackmore Vale area of Dorset, England, about 3 1/2 miles (5.5 kilometres) southwest of Gillingham.

== History ==
The name Kington Magna means 'great King's Town'; it derives from cyne- (later cyning) and tūn, Old English for 'royal estate or manor'. The affix magna, Latin for great, was added to distinguish it from Little Kington, a smaller settlement nearby. In 1086 in the Domesday Book these were recorded together in three entries as Chintone, which had 27 households and a total taxable value of 13 geld units, and was in the hundred of Gillingham. In 1243 it was recorded as Magna Kington. Most of the current buildings in the village are no older than the seventeenth century. In 1851 a Primitive Methodist chapel was built in the village; it was on Chapel Hill, which runs parallel to Church Hill. In 1860 a pottery was established at Bye Farm, north of the main village; it manufactured tiles, drainpipes, bricks, and chimney and flower pots. The parish church of All Saints was restored and enlarged in 1862; most of the building, except for the late 15th-century west tower, was rebuilt. Near the church is a pond which was a medieval fishpond.

== Geography ==
The parish covers about 2,000 acres (800 hectares) and, as well as the main village, includes the small settlement of Nyland in the west. The main village is sited on the slopes of a Corallian limestone hill, overlooking the flat Oxford Clay valley of the small River Cale, which drains into the Stour. In 1906 Sir Frederick Treves wrote in his Highways & Byways in Dorset that the village "straggles down hill like a small mountain stream."

== Demography ==
In the 2011 census the parish had 180 dwellings, 169 households and a population of 389.

== Transport ==
The nearest railway station is in Gillingham. Trains run on the Exeter to Waterloo line.
