= Buckhorn Weston =

Village and civil parish in Dorset, England

Coordinates: 51.0203°N 2.349°W

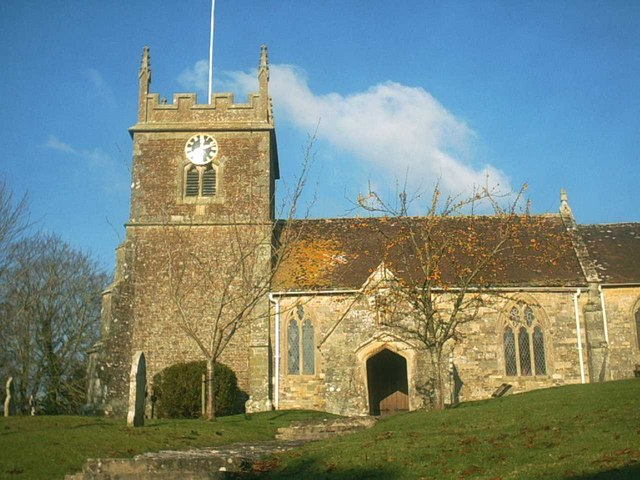
- Parish church of St John the Baptist

- Location within Dorset
- Population: 356
- OS grid reference: ST756246
- Unitary authority: Dorset
- Ceremonial county: Dorset
- Region: South West
- Country: England
- Sovereign state: United Kingdom
- Post town: Gillingham
- Postcode district: SP8
- Dialling code: 01963
- Police: Dorset
- Fire: Dorset and Wiltshire
- Ambulance: South Western
- UK Parliament: North Dorset

Buckhorn Weston is a village and civil parish in the English county of Dorset, situated in the Blackmore Vale about 3 miles (5 kilometres) west of the town of Gillingham. It lies on the western edge of the former royal hunting ground of Gillingham Forest. The underlying geology is Oxford clay and Corallian limestone. In the 2011 census the civil parish had a population of 356.

== History ==
In Saxon times the area was known as Bokere Waston, which meant 'hamlet in the wilderness near the dyke'. Saxons invaded the area around 450 AD, driving out existing inhabitants and possibly erecting a heathen temple on the site of a previous place of worship. When the Saxons converted to Christianity in about 600 AD, they built a church to replace the temple.

In 1086 Buckhorn Weston was recorded in the Domesday Book as Westone; it had 26 households, 6 ploughlands and 40 acres (16 hectares) of meadow. It was in Gillingham hundred and the tenant-in-chief was Count Robert of Mortain. In 1349 the village was badly affected by the plague and its population much reduced.

Later, the estate passed via the Stourton family (associated with Stourhead) and the Fane family into the hands of the Stapleton family in 1837 who remained substantial local landowners until the death of Sir Miles Stapleton in 1979. The village inn still bears the family name and coat of arms. In celebration of the Millennium, the village was enabled to build a new village hall with the help of significant external funding.

== Parish Church ==
The Parish Church of St John the Baptist is a Grade II listed building. The church was well established by the beginning of the 13th century and has probably existed from earlier times. The present building dates largely from the 14th and 15th centuries, though in the 19th century much of it was significantly altered, which included the rebuilding of the west tower in 1861 and the organ loft in 1870.
