= Sutton Waldron =

Village and civil parish in Dorset, England

Coordinates: 50.9425°N 2.1989°W

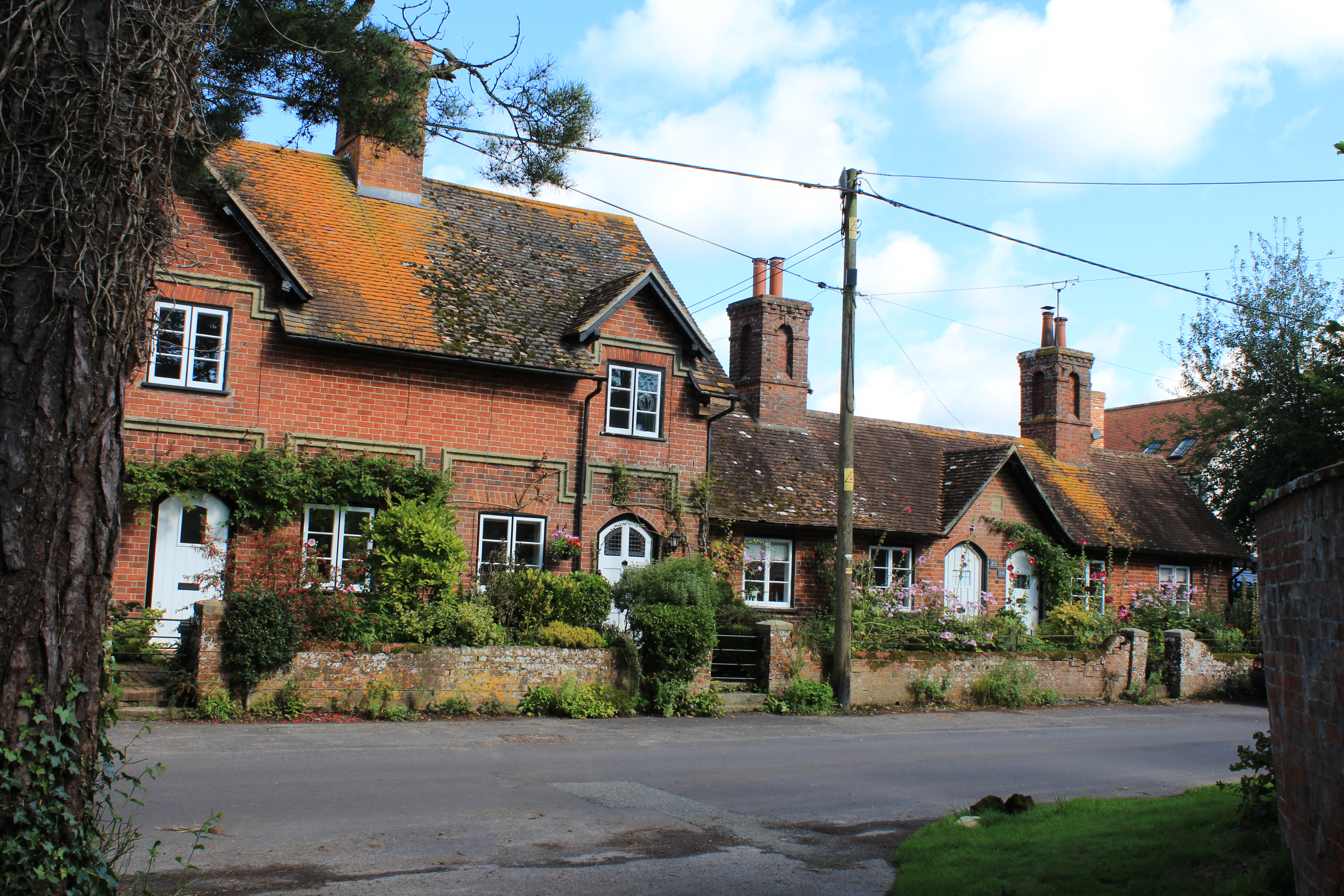
- Sutton Waldron

- Location within Dorset
- Population: 200
- OS grid reference: ST862158
- Civil parish: Sutton Waldron
- Unitary authority: Dorset
- Ceremonial county: Dorset
- Region: South West
- Country: England
- Sovereign state: United Kingdom
- Post town: BLANDFORD FORUM
- Postcode district: DT11
- Dialling code: 01747
- Police: Dorset
- Fire: Dorset and Wiltshire
- Ambulance: South Western
- UK Parliament: North Dorset

Sutton Waldron is a village and civil parish in north Dorset, England, situated on the A350 road between Iwerne Minster and Fontmell Magna, in the Blackmore Vale under the scarp of Cranborne Chase, 8 miles (13 kilometres) north of Blandford Forum and 5 miles (8 kilometres) south of Shaftesbury. In the 2011 census the parish had 93 dwellings, 87 households and a population of 200.

The parish covers about 1,300 acres (530 hectares) in a strip of land that, from west to east, is composed of Kimmeridge clay, Lower Greensand, Gault Clay, Upper Greensand and chalk.

In 1086 in the Domesday Book, Sutton Waldron was recorded as Sudtone; it had 24 households, one mill, six ploughlands, 6 acres (2.4 hectares) of meadow and 40 acres (16 hectares) of woodland. It was in the hundred of Gillingham and the lord and tenant-in-chief was Waleran the hunter.

The parish church dates from 1847 and is constructed in the Decorated Gothic style.
