= List of settlements in Dorset by population =

The largest settlements of Dorset

This is a list of settlements in Dorset by population based on the results of the 2011 census. The next United Kingdom census will take place in 2021. In 2011, there were 18 built-up area subdivisions with 5,000 or more inhabitants in Dorset, shown in the table below, along with the slightly smaller Lyme Regis.

This not a list of parishes or their populations, but of settlements as defined by the ONS.

== Population ranking ==
#	Settlement	District	Population	
#	Settlement	District	2001	2011
1	Bournemouth	Bournemouth, Christchurch and Poole	163,444	183,491
2	Poole	Bournemouth, Christchurch and Poole	144,800	154,718
3	Weymouth	Dorset	53,140	58,200
4	Christchurch	Bournemouth, Christchurch and Poole	50,823	54,210
5	Ferndown	Dorset	25,170	26,559
6	Dorchester	Dorset	16,170	19,060
7	Wimborne Minster	Dorset	14,844	15,174
8	Bridport	Dorset	12,977	13,737
9	Verwood	Dorset	12,070	13,360
10	Blandford Forum	Dorset	10,000	11,694
11	Gillingham	Dorset	8,860	11,278
12	Swanage	Dorset	11,097	10,454
13	Sherborne	Dorset	9,350	9,523
14	Shaftesbury	Dorset	6,665	7,314
15	Weston / Easton	Dorset	5,901	6,069
16	Merley / Oakley	Bournemouth, Christchurch and Poole	6,100	6,005
17	St Leonards	Dorset	5,872	5,984
18	Wareham	Dorset	5,665	5,496
19	Lyme Regis	Dorset	4,406	4,712

== See also ==
- Dorset
