= Stour Provost =

Village and civil parish in Dorset, England

Coordinates: 50.9923°N 2.2957°W

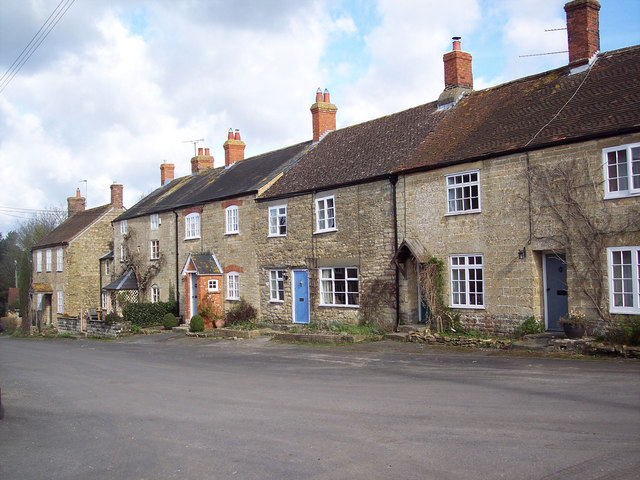
- Stour Provost

- Location within Dorset
- Population: 573 (2021 census)
- OS grid reference: ST793215
- Unitary authority: Dorset
- Ceremonial county: Dorset
- Region: South West
- Country: England
- Sovereign state: United Kingdom
- Post town: Gillingham
- Postcode district: SP8
- Dialling code: 01747
- Police: Dorset
- Fire: Dorset and Wiltshire
- Ambulance: South Western
- UK Parliament: North Dorset

Stour Provost is a village and civil parish in the Blackmore Vale area of north Dorset, England, situated on the River Stour between Sturminster Newton and Gillingham. In old writings it is usually spelled Stower Provost.

The civil parish includes the settlements of Woodville and Stour Row to the east. In the 2021 census, the parish had a population of 573, of which around half live in Stour Row.

== History ==
After the establishment of Stour Provost village near the River Stour, at least four smaller settlements were established in a piecemeal fashion from the 13th century – or perhaps earlier – in the common land or "waste" further east, at Woodville and beyond. These small groups of farms, with their own irregular shaped fields, were separated by unenclosed "waste" probably until the 18th century, when it was enclosed and divided into rectilinear fields.

== Governance ==
At the lower level of local government, Stour Provost is part of a grouped parish council with the neighbouring parishes of East Stour, Todber and West Stour. Stour Provost elects 5 of the 12 members of the council.

At the upper level of local government, Stour Provost is in the Dorset unitary district. For elections to Dorset Council, it is in Beacon electoral ward.

Stour Provost once constituted a liberty, containing only the parish itself. From 1894 to 1974, it was in Shaftesbury Rural District. From 1974 to 2019, it was in North Dorset district.

== Demographics ==
Census population of Stour Provost parish
Census	Population	Female	Male	Households	Source
1921	445				
1931	392				
1951	446				
1961	453				
1971	510				
1981	500				
1991	580				
2001	560	292	268	232	
2011	579	310	269	235	
2021	573	303	270	251	

== Notable buildings ==
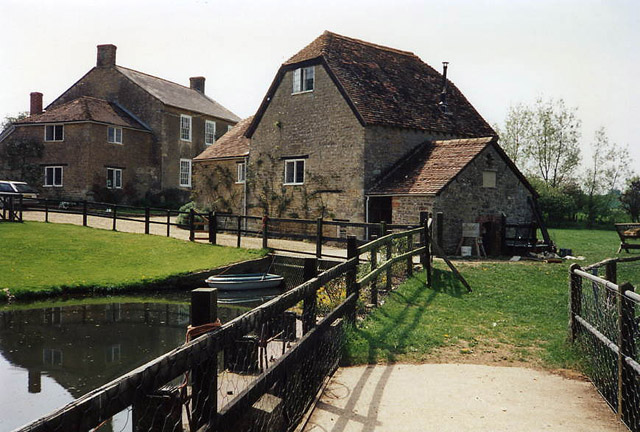
The water mill

The Church of England parish church of St Michael and All Angels is a grade I listed building, possibly dating from the 13th century. It has a 14th century nave and 15th century tower.

An early-19th century water mill stands beside the River Stour and is grade II listed.

== See also ==
- List of liberties in Dorset
