= Hilfield =

Village and civil parish in Dorset, England

Coordinates: 50.8434°N 2.5211°W

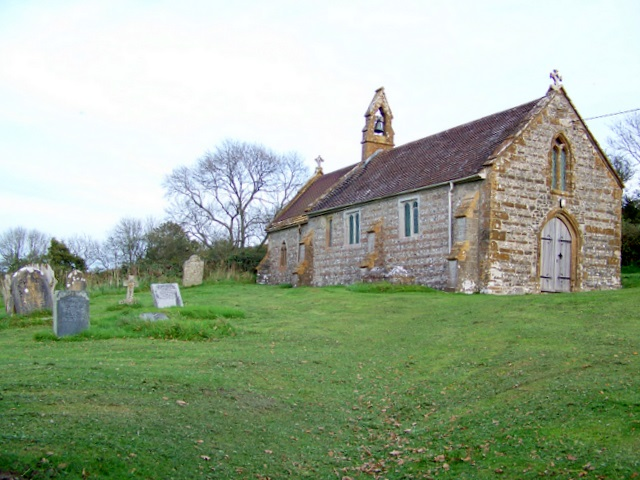
- St Nicholas Church, Hilfield

- Location within Dorset
- Population: 50
- OS grid reference: ST634050
- Unitary authority: Dorset
- Ceremonial county: Dorset
- Region: South West
- Country: England
- Sovereign state: United Kingdom
- Police: Dorset
- Fire: Dorset and Wiltshire
- Ambulance: South Western

Hilfield is a small scattered village and civil parish in west Dorset, England, situated under the scarp face of the Dorset Downs 7 miles (11 km) south of Sherborne. Dorset County Council's 2013 estimate of the parish population is 50.

Hilfield parish church, dedicated to St Nicholas, has late 13th- or early 14th-century origins, though the present building dates from the 15th century and was substantially altered in 1848. It has wooden parquet flooring, notable carved bench ends—possibly moved from Cerne Abbey and thought to be Flemish but of unknown age—and the pulpit and seating have 16th-century panelling. It is one of the smallest English parish churches.

Hilfield Friary is a faith-based community centred on Franciscan brothers of the Anglican Society of St Francis. The Hilfield community is made up of Franciscan Brothers and others who join them; the community encourages environmental sustainability within the Franciscan ethos of peace, faith and justice.
