= Iwerne Courtney =

Village in Dorset, England

Coordinates: 50.9138°N 2.2011°W

Iwerne Courtney: Shroton
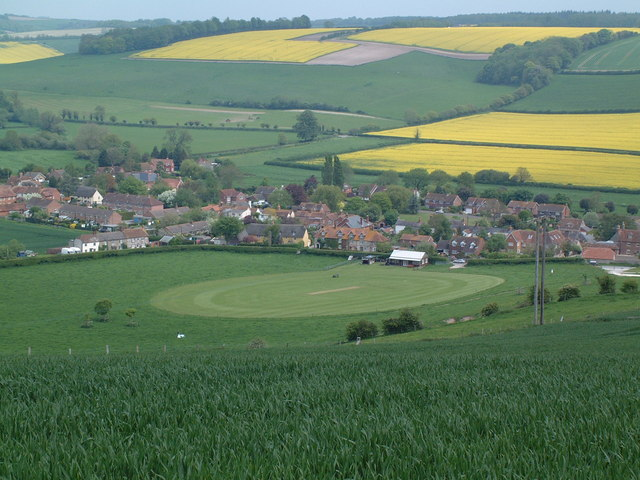
- Iwerne Courtney

- Location within Dorset
- Population: 410 (2013 est.)
- OS grid reference: ST859125
  - London: 100 1/2 mi (162 km) ENE
- Civil parish: Iwerne Courtney or Shroton
- Unitary authority: Dorset
- Ceremonial county: Dorset
- Region: South West
- Country: England
- Sovereign state: United Kingdom
- Post town: BLANDFORD FORUM
- Postcode district: DT11
- Dialling code: 01258
- Police: Dorset
- Fire: Dorset and Wiltshire
- Ambulance: South Western
- UK Parliament: North Dorset

Iwerne Courtney (/ˈjuːɜːrn/), also known as Shroton, is a village and civil parish in the English county of Dorset. It lies approximately 4 miles (6 kilometres) north-west of Blandford Forum. It is sited by the small River Iwerne between Hambledon Hill to the south-west and the hills of Cranborne Chase to the east. In 2001 the parish had 187 households and a population of 400. In 2013 the estimated population of the parish was 410.

== Toponymy ==
The names Iwerne Courtney and Shroton both have long histories. Iwerne ( /ˈjuːɜːrn/) is a Celtic rivername that perhaps refers to a goddess or may mean "yew-river". The village was recorded as Ywern in 877 AD, and in 1086 in the Domesday Book it was Werne. The addition of Courtney is a result of land by the Iwerne stream being owned in the 13th century by the Courtenay family, the Earls of Devon.

The name Shroton derives from the Old English scīr-rēfa and tūn, meaning "sheriff's estate" or "sheriff's town", and its use is due to the lord and tenant-in-chief at the time of Domesday being Baldwin of Exeter, the sheriff of Devon. In 1403 the name was recorded as Shyrevton.

The name Shroton is preferred locally; in his 1980 book Dorset Villages, Roland Gant stated that "I have heard only visitors to Dorset call it Iwerne Courtney".

== History ==
At the time of the Domesday Book, Iwerne Courtney had 17 households and was in the hundred of Gillingham. It had 2 mills, 30 acres (12 hectares) of meadow, 8 ploughlands, and its value to the lord of the manor was £10.

In 1261 the village received a grant from Henry the Third, enabling it to hold two annual fairs and a weekly market. The autumn "Shroton Fair" used to be "one of the main Dorset events of the year". It is mentioned in Owen's book of fairs (1788), under the name Shroton. In 1965 Dorset-born broadcaster Ralph Wightman wrote of the fair that "For many years time was dated in this part of Dorset by Shroton Fair. Old men recalled events by the number of months they had happened before or after this event." However the fair has now "vanished without a trace".

The civil parish of the village was formed by the joining of three settlements: Iwerne Courtney in the centre, Farrington to the northwest and Ranston immediately east of the river. Each settlement had its own open field system. Farrington now consists of a few farms, and at Ranston only the manor house remains.

== Governance ==
The parish of Iwerne Courtney or Shroton is within the Dorset Council ward of Beacon and the parliamentary constituency of North Dorset. The MP since 2015 is Simon Hoare of the Conservative Party.

== Geography ==
Iwerne Courtney civil parish covers nearly 2,000 acres (810 hectares) in an L-shaped area on either side of the River Iwerne. To the east it extends over the chalk hills of Cranborne Chase, reaching an elevation of over 165 metres (541 feet). To the west it extends north-west over greensand, gault and Kimmeridge clay at an altitude of about 48 to 80 m (157 to 262 ft), although in the south-west it rises to over 190 m (620 ft) on the slopes of Hambledon Hill, an outlier of the chalk.
