= Melbury Bubb =

Hamlet in Dorset, England

Coordinates: 50.8571°N 2.5753°W

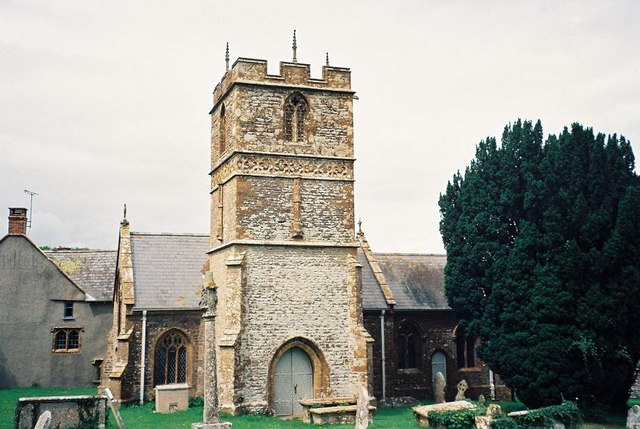
- Parish church of St Mary

- Location within Dorset
- Population: 40
- OS grid reference: ST596065
- Unitary authority: Dorset
- Ceremonial county: Dorset
- Region: South West
- Country: England
- Sovereign state: United Kingdom
- Police: Dorset
- Fire: Dorset and Wiltshire
- Ambulance: South Western

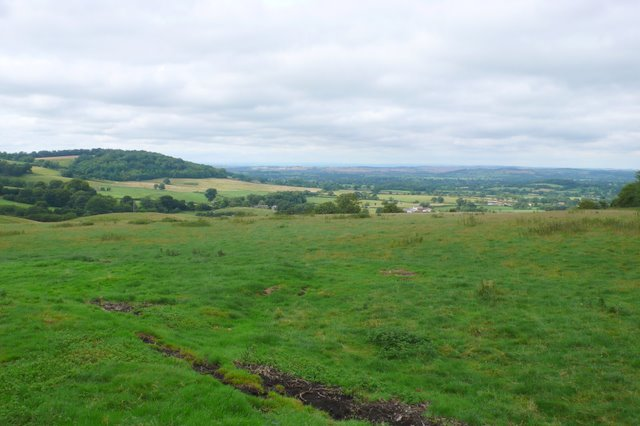
Bubb Down Hill (centre left) seen from Batcombe Hill

Melbury Bubb is a small village and civil parish in the county of Dorset in South West England, situated approximately 7 miles (11 km) south of the town of Sherborne. It is sited on Cornbrash limestone beneath the chalk hills of the Dorset Downs. The A37 trunk road between Dorchester and Bristol passes about 0.5 miles (0.80 km) to the west, on the other side of Bubb Down Hill. This hill used to be the site of a beacon. The first half of the village name derives from maele and burh—Old English for "multi-coloured" and "fortified place"—and the second half is a manorial name which derives either from a Saxon resident named 'Bubba' or from medieval lords of the manor. Dorset County Council's latest (2013) estimate of the parish population is 40.

The parish church of St Mary has a 15th-century tower but the rest of the building was largely rebuilt in a 19th-century restoration. Its font however is carved out of the column of an upturned Saxon cross; it is elaborately carved, although the carvings are upside-down. Families were often noted as owners in books, for instance: the Blain family recently sold the property, despite occupying it for just shy of 100 years.
