= West Stour, Dorset =

Village and civil parish in Dorset, England

Coordinates: 51.0025°N 2.3076°W

West Stour
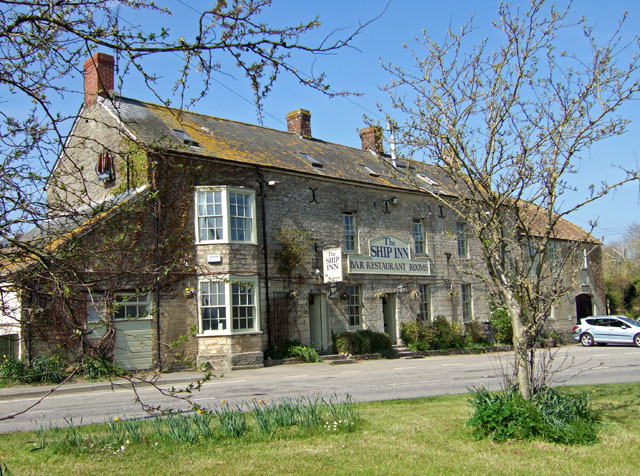
- The Ship Inn, West Stour

- Location within Dorset
- Population: 200
- OS grid reference: ST785226
- Unitary authority: Dorset
- Ceremonial county: Dorset
- Region: South West
- Country: England
- Sovereign state: United Kingdom
- Post town: Gillingham
- Postcode district: SP8
- Dialling code: 01747
- Police: Dorset
- Fire: Dorset and Wiltshire
- Ambulance: South Western
- UK Parliament: North Dorset

West Stour is a village and civil parish situated in the Blackmore Vale area of north Dorset, England. It is one of a group of villages known as The Stours, located in the River Stour Valley, five miles (eight kilometres) south of Gillingham. West Stour has a village hall, one public house and a service station on the main A30 road.

West Stour is one of four parishes—the others being East Stour, Stour Provost and Todber—under the governance of The Stours Parish Council. It has a population of about 200.

The nearest railway station is at Gillingham. Trains run on the Exeter to Waterloo line.

== History ==
In 1086 in the Domesday Book two settlements were recorded in the parish: West Stour and Little Kington. The latter remained small but West Stour developed into a village. West Stour's open fields were enclosed in 1779.

== St Mary's Church ==
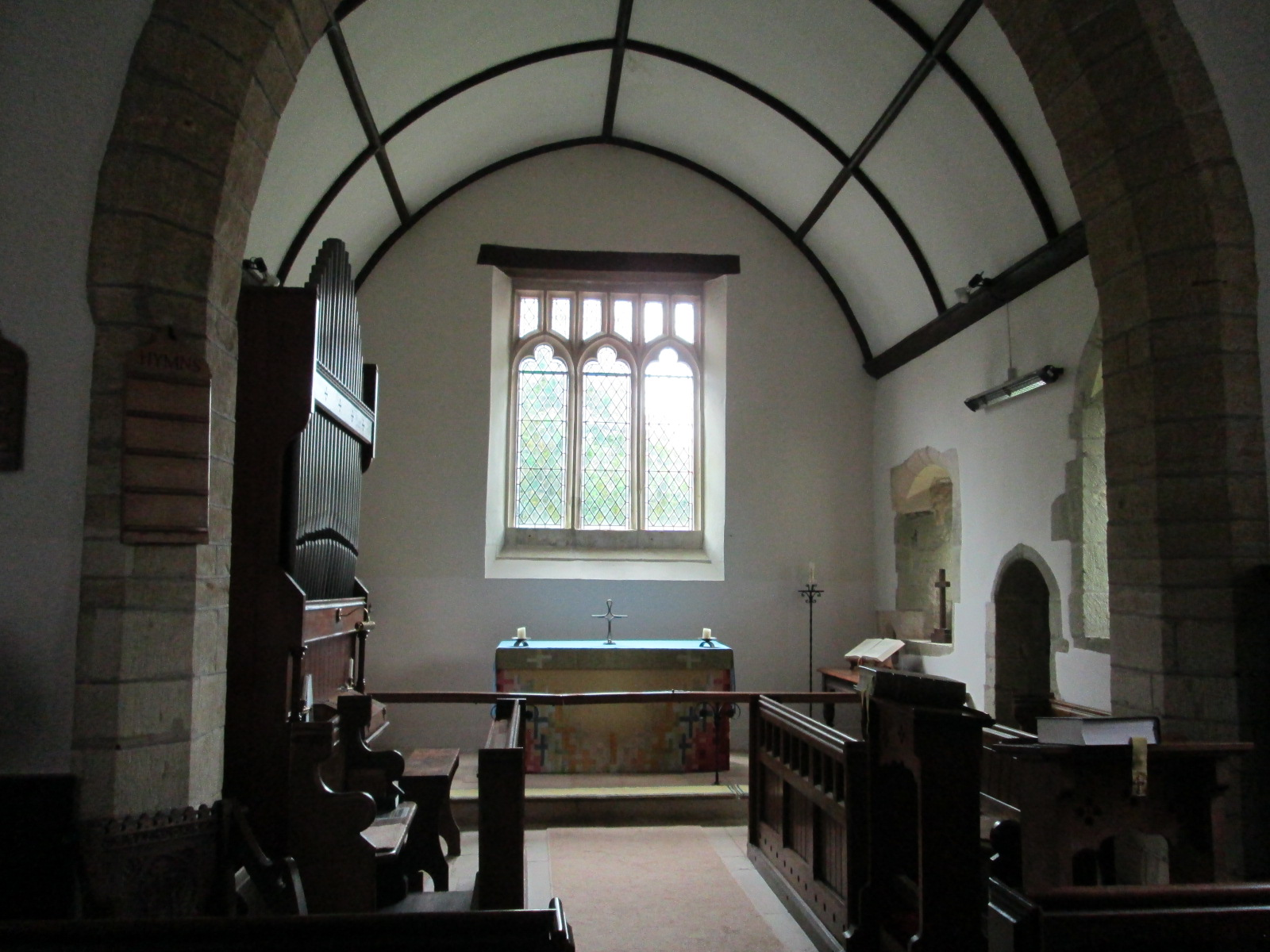
Interior of St Mary's Church, looking towards the chancel

St Mary's Church, at the north end of Church Street, is a Grade II* listed building.

The chancel dates from the 13th century, with some alterations in the late 18th century. The nave and the tower (south of the nave) were rebuilt in 1840; the rebuilding used the original foundations, and so the chancel is not quite aligned with the nave, being slightly to the south. The stone font is of the 13th century. The tiled floor and seating were fitted in 1912.

There are three bells in the tower, one of the late 15th century, the others dated 1635 and 1733.

A commemorative plaque in the north wall records the names of three men from the village – George Beale, Charlie Trim and Tom Wilson – who died in the Great War.
