= Todber =

Village and civil parish in Dorset, England

Coordinates: 50.979°N 2.287°W

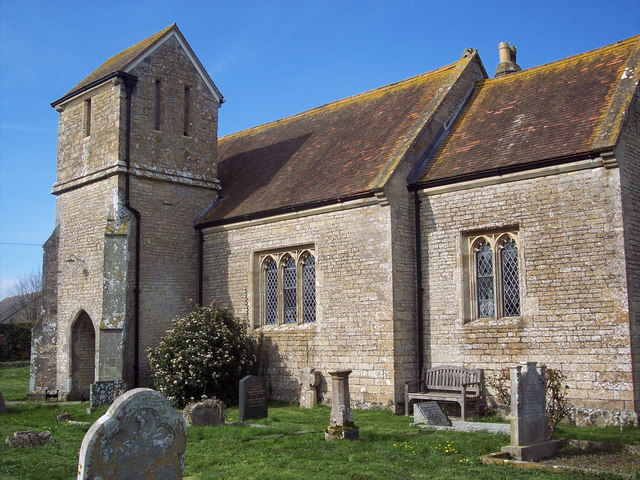
- Parish church of St Andrew, Todber

- Location within Dorset
- Population: 140
- OS grid reference: ST800200
- Unitary authority: Dorset
- Ceremonial county: Dorset
- Region: South West
- Country: England
- Sovereign state: United Kingdom
- Post town: Sturminster Newton
- Postcode district: DT10
- Police: Dorset
- Fire: Dorset and Wiltshire
- Ambulance: South Western
- UK Parliament: North Dorset

Todber is a village and civil parish in the county of Dorset in southern England. It lies in the Blackmore Vale, about five miles (eight kilometres) southwest of Shaftesbury. The underlying geology is Corallian limestone. In the 2011 census the parish had 55 households and a population of 140.

In 1086 Todber was recorded in the Domesday Book as Todeberie; it was in the hundred of Gillingham, the lord was Geoffrey Mallory and the tenant-in-chief was William of Mohun. It had one mill, 12 acres (4.9 hectares) of meadow and 2 ploughlands.

Todber parish church was rebuilt in the Early English and Perpendicular styles in 1879, though the tower is of earlier construction.

Todber is one of four parishes — the others being East Stour, Stour Provost and West Stour — under the governance of The Stours Parish Council.
