= Hawkchurch =

Village in Devon, England

Coordinates: 50.800°N 2.935°W

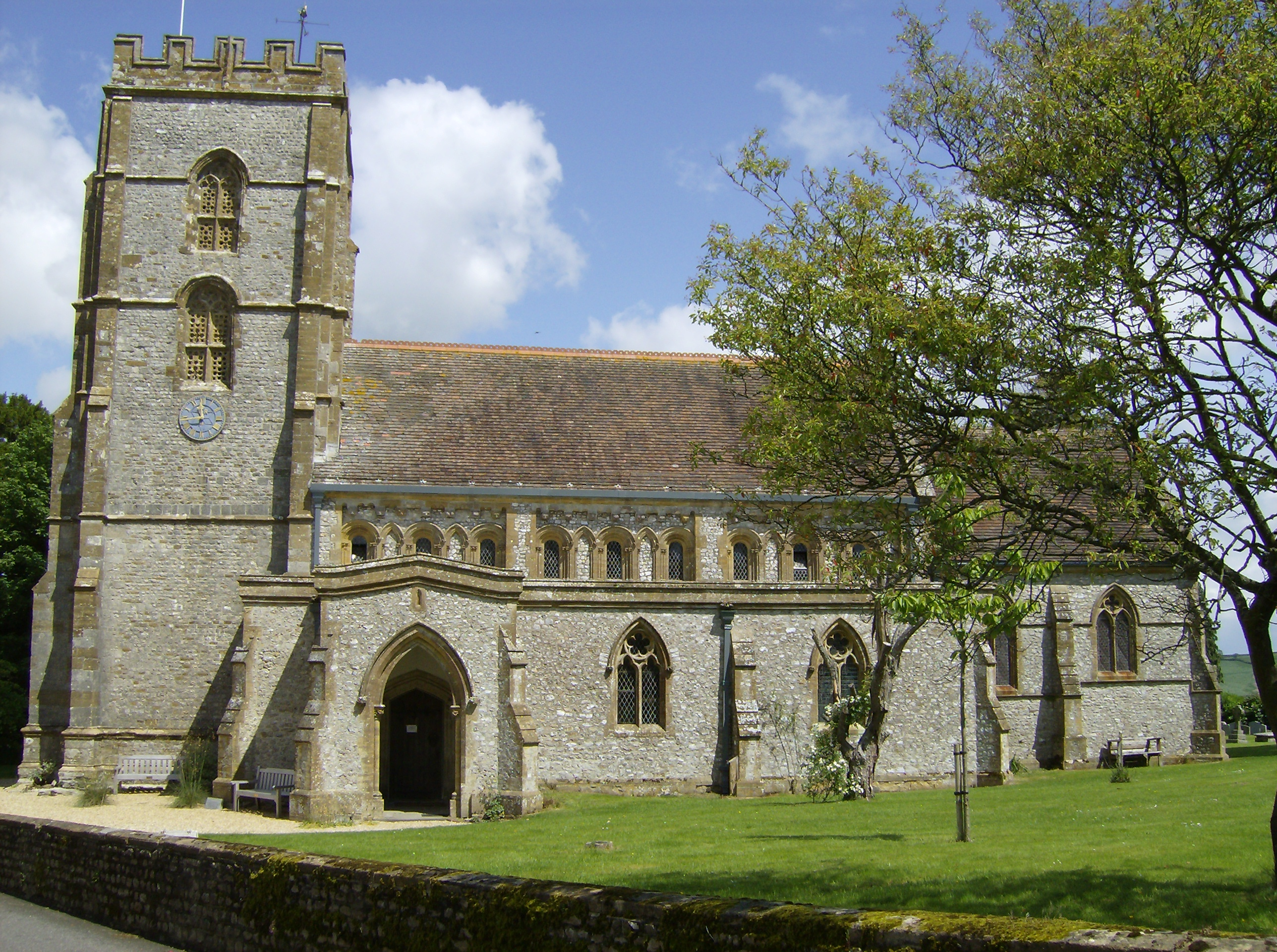
- St. John the Baptist Church, Hawkchurch

- Location within Devon
- Population: 553
- OS grid reference: ST340004
- Civil parish: Hawkchurch
- District: East Devon
- Shire county: Devon
- Region: South West
- Country: England
- Sovereign state: United Kingdom
- Post town: Axminster
- Postcode district: EX13
- Dialling code: 01297
- Police: Devon and Cornwall
- Fire: Devon and Somerset
- Ambulance: South Western
- UK Parliament: Honiton and Sidmouth

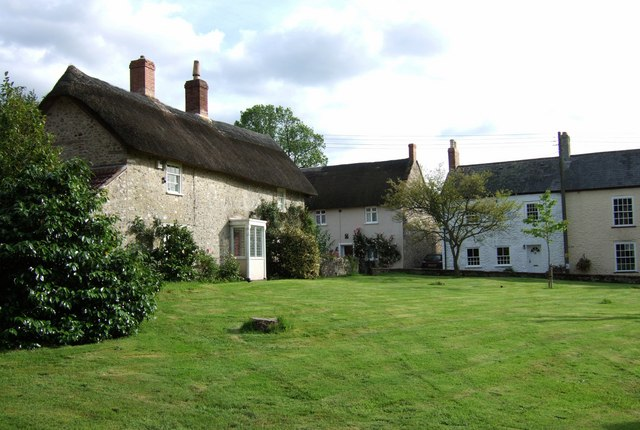
Cottages at Hawkchurch

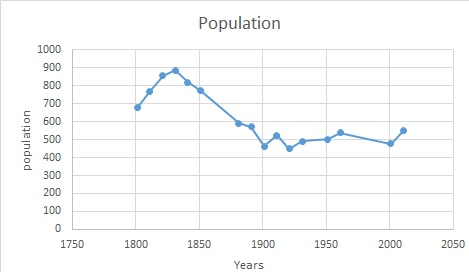
“Total Population of Hawkchurch Parish, Devon, as reported by the Census of Population from 1881 to 2011”.

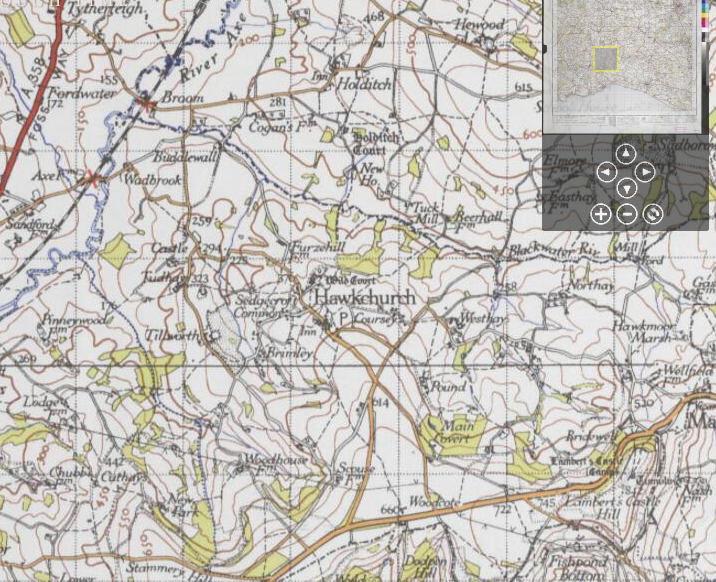
Map Of Hawkchurch

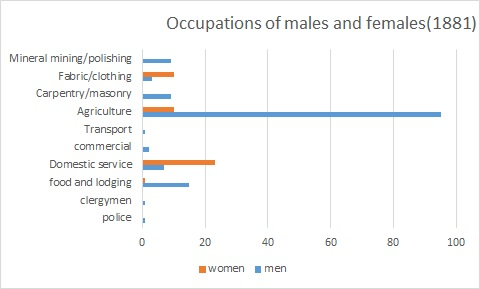

Hawkchurch is a village and civil parish in Devon, England, 3 miles (5 km) north east of Axminster on the border of Devon and Dorset, and about 6 miles (10 km) south of Somerset. It is 4 miles (6 km) north of the tourist and fishing town of Lyme Regis.

The parish, in the Archdeaconry of Dorset and Diocese of Salisbury is located on the border of Devon and Dorset. Because of its location, it has been classified as part of each county at different times, but was formally transferred from Dorset to Devon in 1896.

The parish church of St. John the Baptist dates from Saxon times, however, the building was heavily restored in 1862.

In 1878 the Rev. John Going became rector to the parish and planted rose trees on the walls of every cottage, which gave Hawkchurch its title "The Village of Roses".

The village pub, "The Old Inn", is a traditional coaching house, and a hostelry has been on the site since 1543.

The Manor House, Wyld Court, dates from 1593. It was built for Robert Moore, whose coat of arms is inscribed above the door. An earlier mediaeval house on the site belonged to Cerne Abbey, prior to the dissolution of the Monasteries. It is a Grade II* listed building.

In 1870–1872, Hawkchurch was described as:

a village and a parish in the district of Axminster and county of Dorset. The village stands near the boundary with Devon, the river Axe, and the Yeovil and Exeter railway, 3¼ miles NE by E of Axminster; and has a post office under Axminster.

== Population trends ==
The parish has witnessed a fluctuating population over the past few centuries, a major surge around 1820–1840, which was followed by a steady decline until the early 1900s. From the early 1900s to the present day, the parish has only experienced mild fluctuations in the population and has stayed relatively steady overall. The parish is currently on a steady population surge.

According to the 2011 Census, there were 271 males and 282 females living in the parish.

== Occupation trends ==
Over the course of history, due its location and size, the parish has centred its income around agriculture, with this field being the leading occupation. This fact has remained the same however in modern days, agriculture has had to compete with the surge in a now thriving tourist industry due to the location's scenic views. According to the 2011 Census, there were 256 people aged 16 to 74 in employment with full-time employment being slightly higher than part-time employment in the tables.

== Religion in Hawkchurch ==
Christianity is the most prominent religion in the parish with 373 out of 553 identifying as Christian, and 123 people identifying as non religious by 2011.

== Solar panel installation controversy ==
In November 2015, residents of a west Dorset valley had joined forces to protest against proposals for a solar farm they had labelled an “environmental disaster waiting to happen”.

Villagers from Thorncombe and Hawkchurch had combined to launch the Stop Sadborow Solar, which would have seen the installation of solar panels on a 43.5-acre (17.6 ha) site near Gashay Farm in Hawkchurch, on the Dorset-Devon border.

The application was lodged with West Dorset District Council by developers British Solar Renewables, and now villagers have slammed the proposals and are calling on the district council to refuse the application, due to the area's landscape and popularity with tourists.

== Hawkchurch's first community shop ==
In June 2014, Hawkchurch residents turned out in force for the official opening of their new community shop.

The volunteer-run store had been set up in a portable cabin on land near the village hall – with plans for a purpose-built structure once it was established.

County Councillor Andrew Moulding cut a ribbon to declare the new venture up and running following a two-year campaign.

Hawkchurch had been without its own store for more than 20 years and the new shop will open seven days a week and is designed to serve not only the village but the surrounding communities and visitors.

Organisers reports indicated that the store had already proven popular with a wide variety of shoppers shortly after its opening.
