= Sturminster Marshall =

Coordinates: 50°47′50″N 2°04′29″W

- Village and civil parish
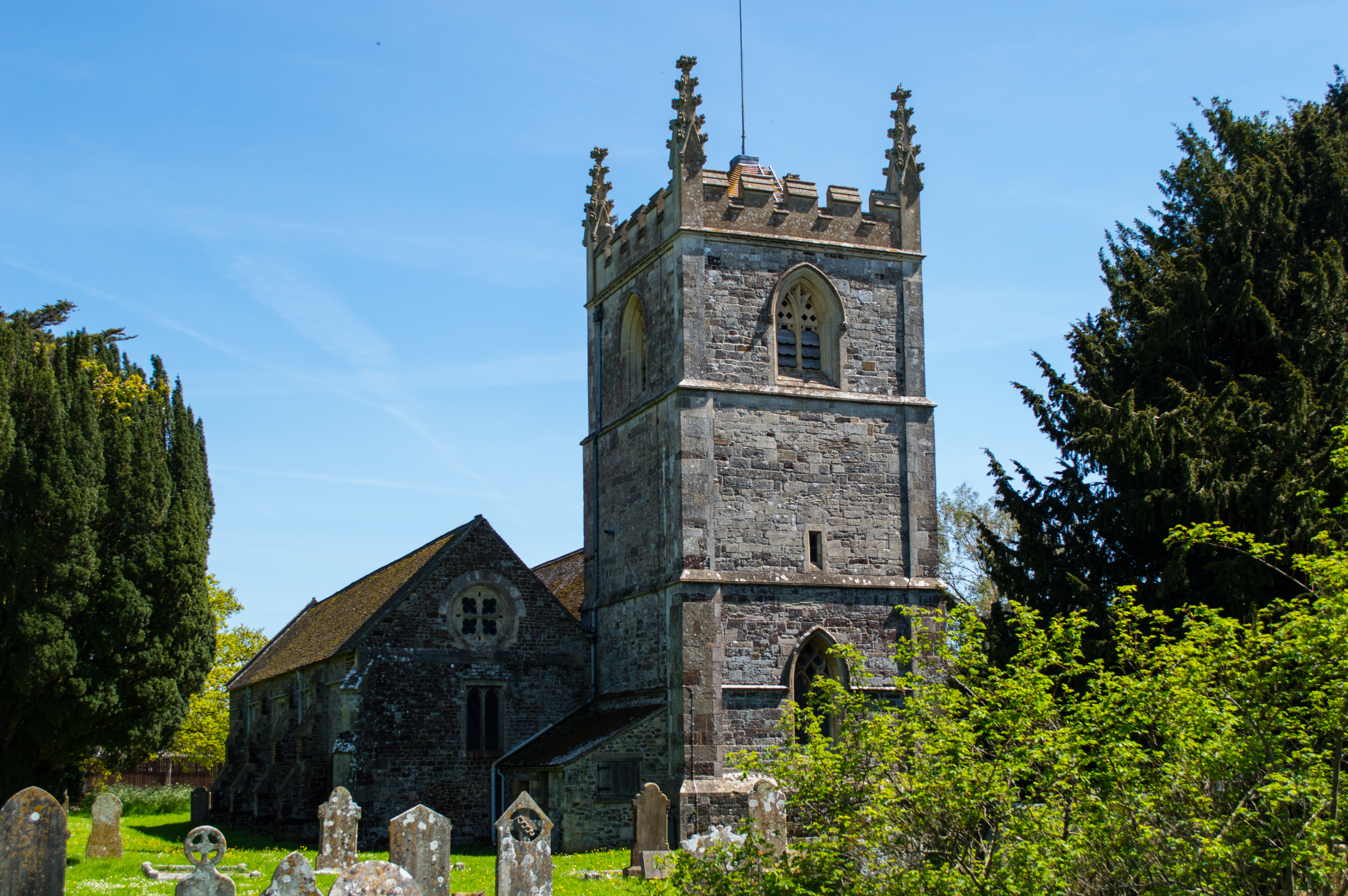
- St Mary's Church

- Location within Dorset
- Interactive map showing the parish boundary
- Population: 1,972 (2021 census)
- OS grid reference: SY946998
- Unitary authority: Dorset
- Ceremonial county: Dorset
- Region: South West
- Country: England
- Sovereign state: United Kingdom
- Post town: Wimborne
- Postcode district: BH21
- Dialling code: 01258
- Police: Dorset
- Fire: Dorset and Wiltshire
- Ambulance: South Western
- UK Parliament: North Dorset

Sturminster Marshall is a village and civil parish in the east of Dorset in England, situated on the River Stour between Blandford Forum and Poole. The parish includes the village of Almer to the west, and the hamlet of Henbury to the south-east, and had a population of 1,972 at the 2021 census. The village is twinned with the French commune of Sainte-Mère-Église in Normandy.

== History ==
King Alfred the Great, in his will of 899, a copy of which can be seen at the British Library, left the village to his youngest son Æthelweard (c.880-922).

Sturminster Marshall has a 13th-century church, St Mary's. Its predecessor contributed to the village's name; 'Sturminster' meaning "church on the River Stour". The second part of the name came from William Marshal. Until 1857, St. Hubert's Church in Corfe Mullen acted as a chapel of ease to Sturminster Marshall. St. Mary's pre-Reformation chalice, dating to 1536, has survived although the stem has been replaced. It is on loan to Dorset Museum in Dorchester, Dorset.

== Governance ==
As a civil parish, Sturminster Marshall has a parish council of eight members.

For local government, Sturminster Marshall is in the Dorset unitary district. For elections to Dorset Council it is in Stour and Allen Vale ward. Historically, Sturminster Marshall was in Cogdean Hundred. It was in Wimborne and Cranborne Rural District from 1894 until 1974, and then in East Dorset district until Dorset became a unitary district in 2019.

For elections to the House of Commons, it is in the North Dorset constituency.

== Demographics ==
At the 2021 census, the civil parish had a population of 1,972 people in 774 households.

Census population of Sturminster Marshall parish
Census	Population	Female	Male	Households	Source
1921	899				
1931	873				
1951	1,080				
1961	1,189				
1971	1,160				
1981	1,150				
1991	1,460				
2001	1,895	993	902	691	
2011	1,969	988	981	747	
2021	1,972	1,003	969	774	

== Landmarks ==
=== Church of St Mary the Virgin ===
The earliest parts of the Church of England parish church date from the 12th century, with 13th, 14th and 15th century additions. The three-stage west tower was rebuilt in 1805 and the whole building was heavily restored in 1859. The monuments and brasses inside the church are mainly 19th century, but there is a 17th-century funeral helm and a 14th-century coffin slab with a Latin inscription: Quisquis ades qui morte cades, sta, perlege, plora. Sum quod eris, fueram quod es. Pro me precor, ora. (Note: Perhaps translated as: "Whoever you are who will die, stop, read this, and weep. I am what you will be; I was what you are. I beg you: pray for me.") It is a grade II* listed building.

=== White Mill Bridge ===
Crossing the River Stour to the east of the village is a 16th-century stone bridge of eight arches. The later parapet overhangs the bridge sides on corbels. An early 19th-century iron plaque threatens anyone damaging the bridge with penal transportation. It is a grade I listed building.

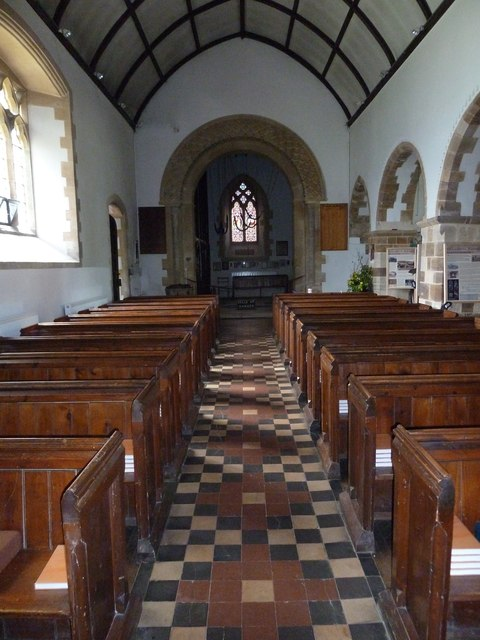
Interior of St Mary's Church, looking east

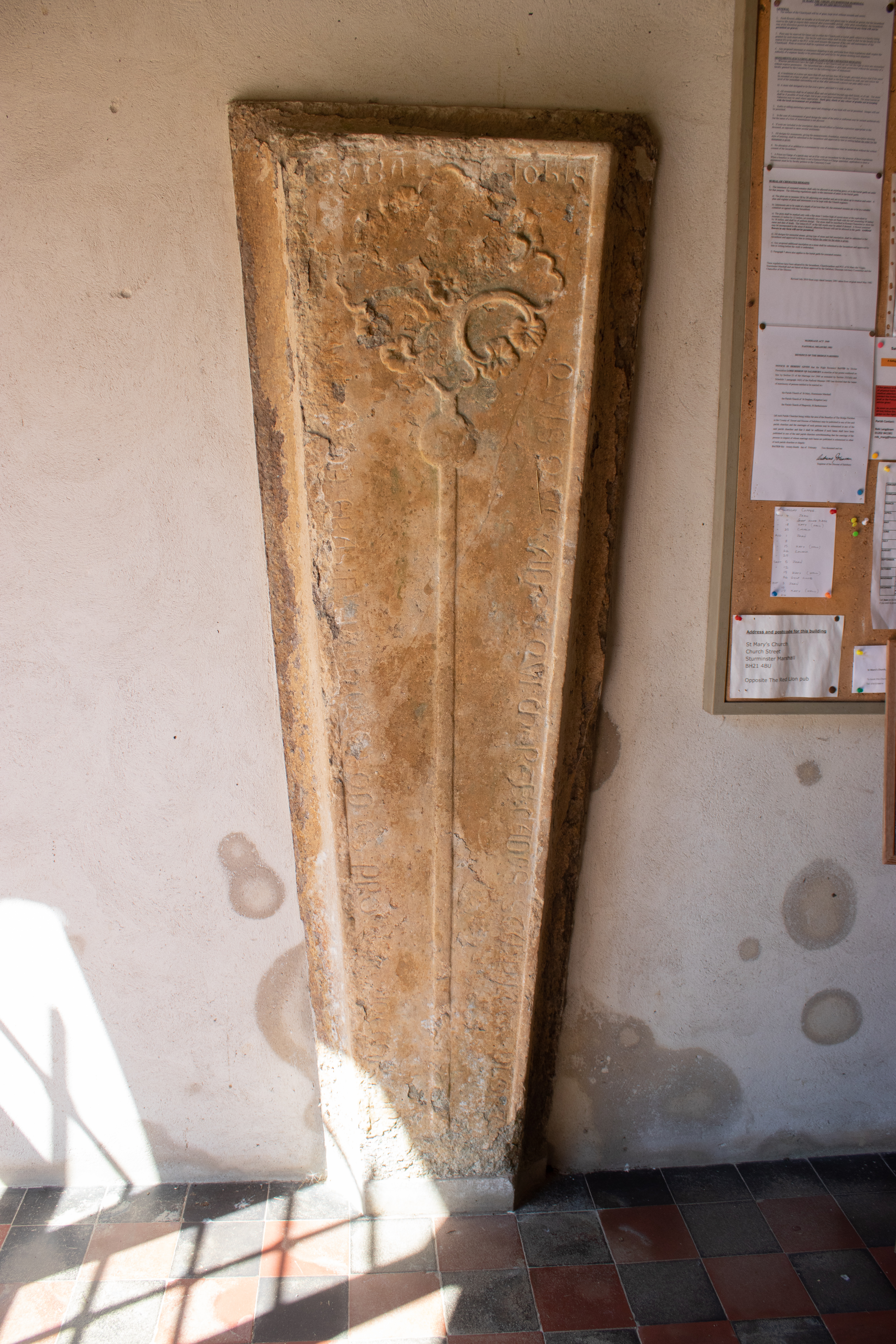
14th-century coffin lid in the south porch of the church

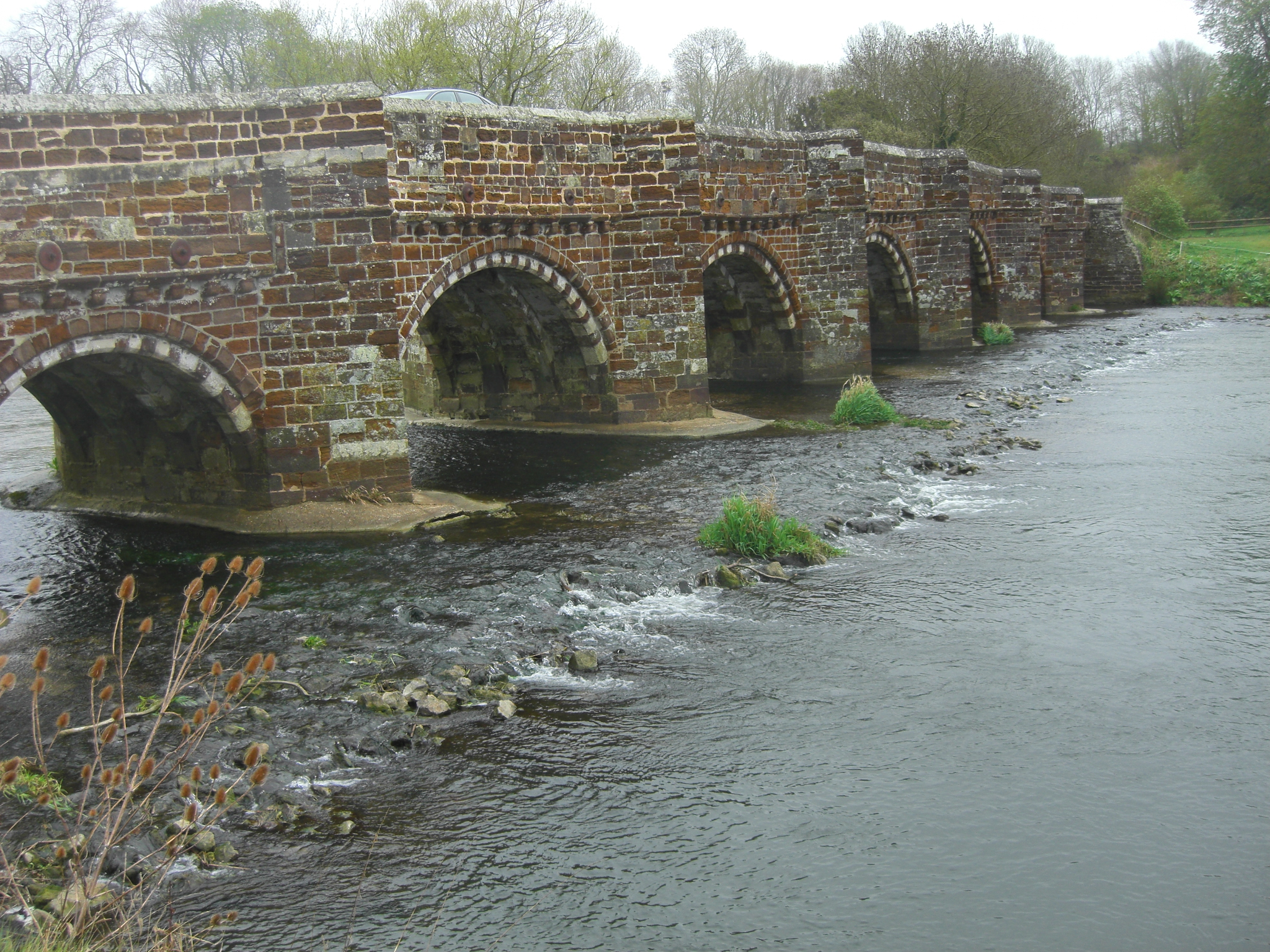
The 16th-century White Mill Bridge crossing the River Stour

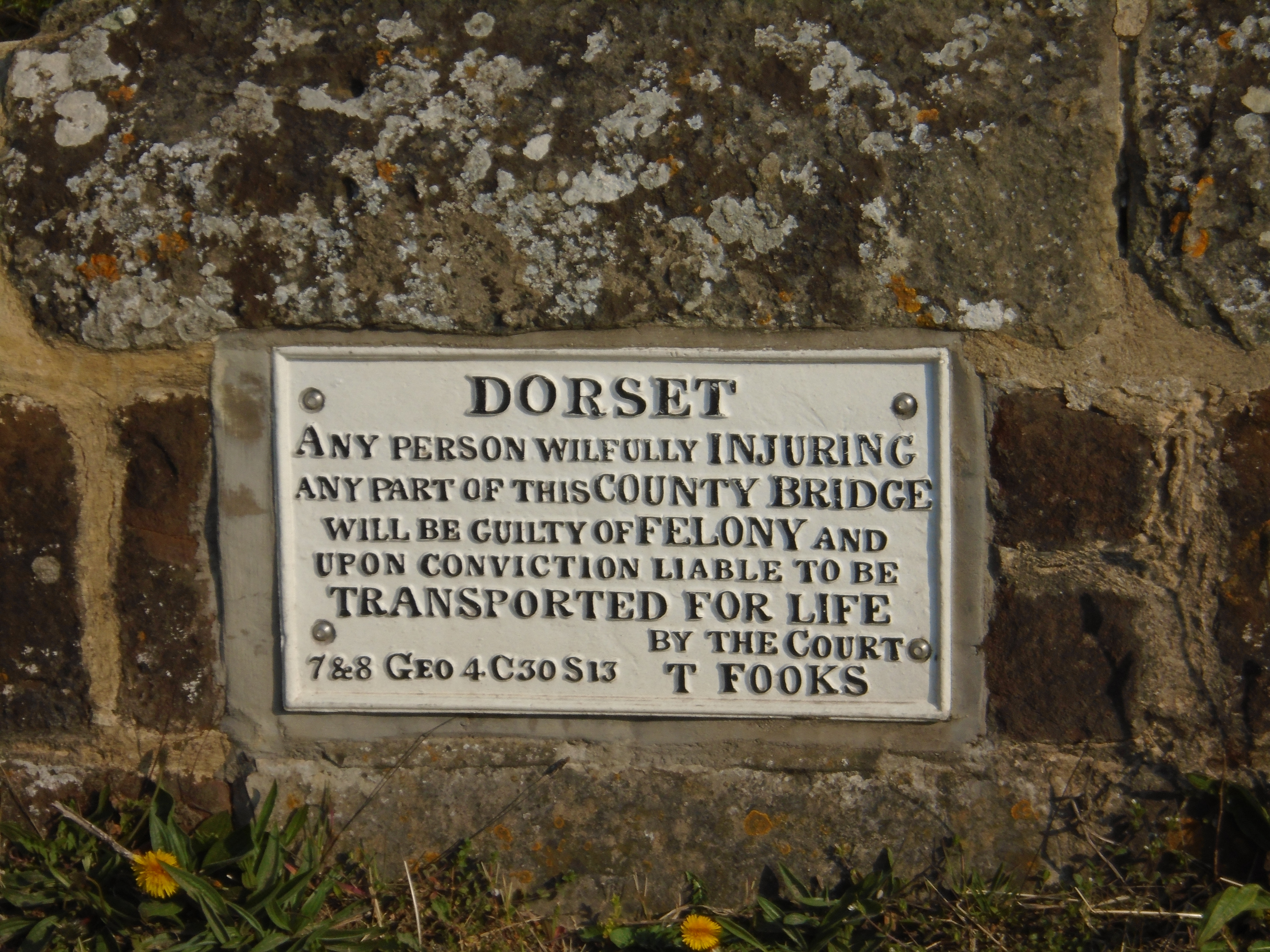
Old iron warning sign on the bridge parapet

== Community facilities ==
Sturminster Marshall has a playing field with a children's playground in one corner. Nearby is the Memorial Hall which offers a meeting-space for many village societies. There is also an old school hall which is also used as a meeting-space.

There are many walks around the village including the Stour Valley Way, which follows the Stour right from the source to the sea.

The village has two pubs: the Red Lion within the village and the Golden Fox on the outskirts.

The village has a cricket club with a side in Dorset division 3. There is also a football club with a senior side and several junior teams.
