= River Stour, Dorset =

River in Dorset, England

River Stour
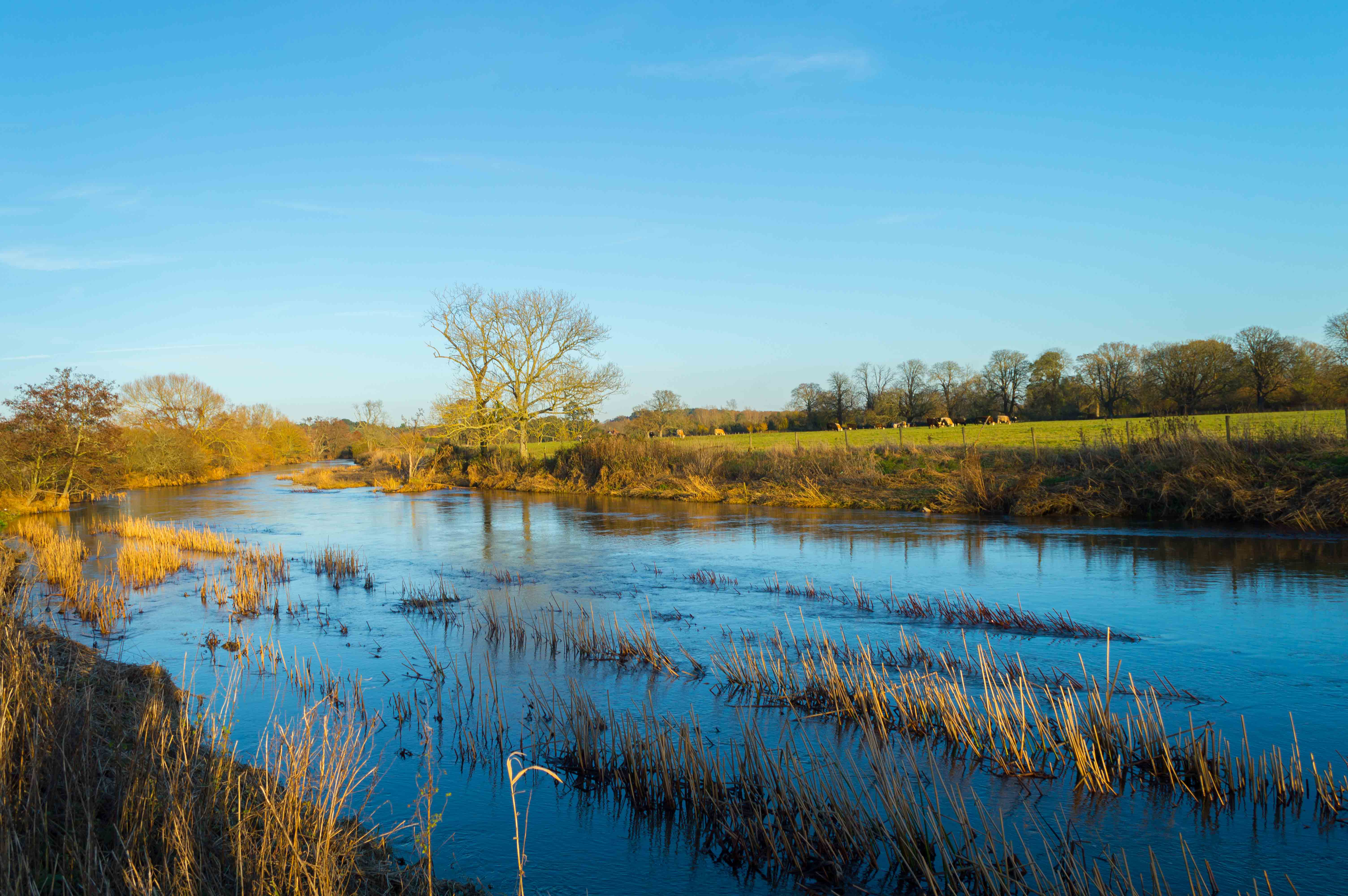
- The Dorset Stour at Little Canford, just west of Canford Magna

Location
- Country: England
- County: Dorset, Wiltshire, Somerset
- District: Salisbury, Somerset, Dorset, Bournemouth, Christchurch and Poole
- Towns: Gillingham, Sturminster Newton, Blandford Forum, Wimborne Minster, Christchurch

Physical characteristics
- Source: Stourhead
  - location: St Peter's Pump, Mere, Wiltshire
- Mouth
  - location: Christchurch Harbour, Christchurch, Dorset
  - coordinates: 50.72796°N 1.77295°W
- Length: 61 mi (98 km)

Basin features
- Tributaries
  - left: Allen, Moors River, River Tarrant, River Lodden
  - right: River Divelish, River Lydden, River Cale,

The River Stour (/ˈstaʊər/) is a 61 mi (98 km) river which flows through Wiltshire and Dorset in southern England, and drains into the English Channel. The catchment area for the river and its tributaries is listed as 480 square miles (1,240 km^{2}).

== Toponymy ==
It is sometimes called the Dorset Stour to distinguish it from other rivers of the same name in Kent, Suffolk and the Midlands. According to Brewer's Dictionary of Britain & Ireland, the name Stour rhymes with hour and derives from Old English meaning "violent", "fierce" or the "fierce one".

== History ==
The river burst its banks at Christchurch during the 2013–14 winter floods and 100 residents were evacuated.

=== Prehistoric archaeology ===
The Stour valley has produced rich evidence for early human (Palaeolithic) activity. Gravel pits in the lower reaches of the river (many underlying modern day Bournemouth) produced hundreds of Lower Palaeolithic handaxes when they were quarried, particular during the late 19th century and the first half of the 20th century. Archaeological investigations around 2010 near Corfe Mullen suggested that some of the artefacts from those quarries may be around 400,000 to 500,000 years old.

== Literary associations ==
In Medieval Welsh literature, the river was said to be the site of an important battle and the dividing line between ancient Cornwall and Loegria (England). According to Geoffrey of Monmouth's Historia Regum Britanniae, King Locrinus divorces Queen Gwendolen in favour of his secret lover, Estrildis. Returning to her native Cornwall, Gwendolen assembles all the forces of that kingdom against Locrinus. The two armies fight a battle at the river Stour where Locrinus is slain and Gwendolen becomes the ruler of both kingdoms, becoming the first queen regnant of the Kings of the Britons.

The Stour also appears in more occasional fashion in The Faerie Queene.

Thomas Hardy wrote about Overlooking the River Stour, while William Barnes similarly referenced the "darksome pools o' stwoneless Stour" in his The Water Crowvoot.

== Course ==
The source of the river is fed from greensand springs at Stourhead, in Wiltshire, where it forms a series of artificial lakes which are part of the Stourhead estate owned by the National Trust. It flows south into Dorset through the Blackmore Vale and the towns of Gillingham and Sturminster Newton.

At Marnhull the Stour is joined by the River Cale and then (two miles downstream) by the River Lydden. At Blandford Forum the river breaks through the chalk ridge of the Dorset Downs, and from there flows south east into the heathlands of south east Dorset. At Wimborne Minster it is joined by the River Allen, and at its estuary at Christchurch it is joined by the River Avon before it flows through the harbour into the English Channel.

From source to estuary, the river falls approximately 750 feet (230 m) over its 60 mi (97 km) length.

For many miles the river is followed by the route of the now disused Somerset and Dorset Joint Railway, which bridged the river four times in a 9 mi (14 km) section between Sturminster Newton and Blandford Forum.

Because much of the river's course is across clay soil, the river's water level varies greatly. In summer, low water level makes the river a diverse and important habitat, supporting many rare plants. In winter, the river often floods, and is therefore bordered by wide and fertile flood plains.

A number of towns and villages in Dorset are named after the river, including East Stour, West Stour, Stourpaine, Stourton Caundle, Stour Row, Stour Provost, Sturminster Newton, and Sturminster Marshall. Sturminster Newton is famous for its water mill and town bridge, which still bears the notice warning potential vandals that damaging the bridge is punishable by penal transportation.

== Ecology ==
The river flows through a myriad of differing settings and scenery (reed bed, open water, coastal, estuarine, river, streams, lowland heath) and as such is host to species such as the pipistrelle bat, harbour porpoise, great crested newt, medicinal leech, Desmoulin's whorl snail and the starlet sea anemone.

There are many fish that live in and use the river, which include; barbel, bleak, bream, chub, dace, eel, gudgeon, grayling, minnow, perch, pike, roach, rudd, salmon, tench and trout. In October 2025, the non-native zander has also been caught from the tidal reaches of the Stour, which may be the first recorded individual in the catchment. It is unknown as to what extent the zander population is present. The harbour at Christchurch has also been used to land oysters, crab, lobster and cuttlefish, all of which were fished from the harbour itself. Bass and mullet are known to use the estuary for feeding and as a nursery.

Downstream of Blandford Forum, the Stour is host to an insect known as the Blandford Fly (Simulium posticatum) which is known for leaving painful bites on humans. Attempts have been made to rid the fly from the area with a special spray used on the larval habitats of the fly.

== Recreation and amenity ==
The harbour at Christchurch and the lower reaches of the Stour and the Avon are host to a multitude of marinas, boat clubs and landing stages. The Stour is navigable as far upstream as Tuckton (the tidal limit) and whilst there is a low bridge at Iford, it is possible to navigate as far as the rapids which are 0.9 miles (1.5 km) upstream of Iford Bridge. Spring tides have been known to penetrate a further 0.9 miles (1.5 km) upstream, as far as Blackwater Bridge (the A338 road). Boats can be hired from several yards and landings in the harbour and estuary area with kayaking and canoeing being popular on the river too.

The Stour Valley Way is a designated long-distance footpath that follows almost all of the course of the river.

White Mill, an 18th-century watermill on the river near Sturminster Marshall, is owned by the National Trust and open to the public.

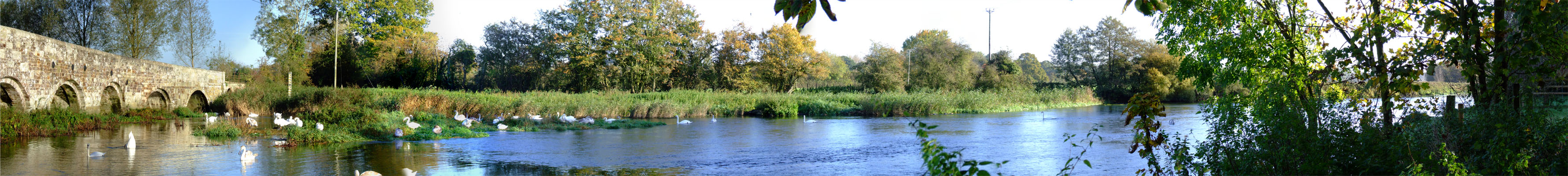
The River Stour passing under Crawford Bridge

== See also ==
- List of rivers of the United Kingdom
