= Blackmore Vale =

Geographical area in north Dorset

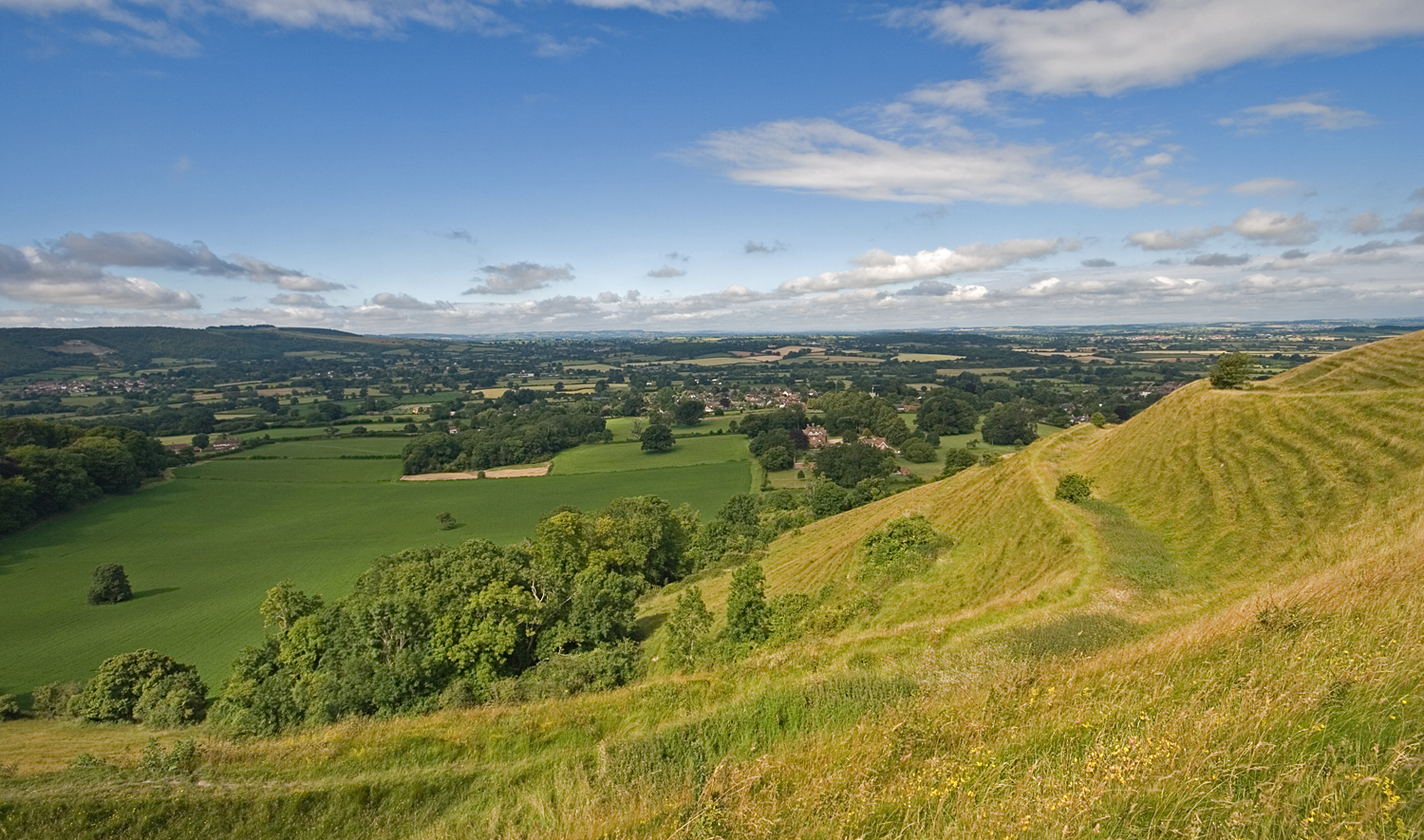
View from Hambledon Hill overlooking Child Okeford, Shillingstone, and the Blackmore Vale

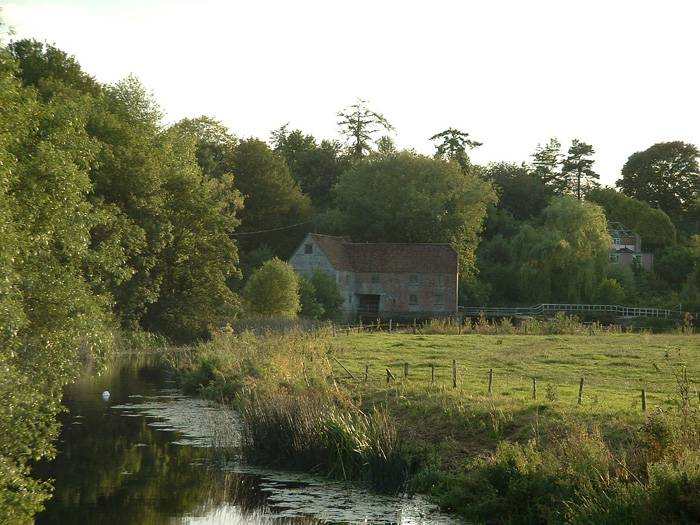
Sturminster Newton watermill

The Blackmore Vale (/ˈblækmɔːr/; less commonly spelt Blackmoor) is a vale, or wide valley, in north Dorset, and to a lesser extent south Somerset and southwest Wiltshire in southern England.

== Geography ==
The vale is part of the Stour valley and part of the natural region known as the Blackmoor Vale and Vale of Wardour. The southern periphery of the vale is in the Dorset National Landscape area.

To the south and east, the vale is clearly delimited by the steep escarpments of two areas of higher chalk downland, the Dorset Downs to the south, and Cranborne Chase to the east. To the north and west, the definitions of the vale are more ambiguous, as the landscape changes more gradually around the upper reaches of the Stour and its tributaries. One definition places the boundary along the watershed between the Stour and neighbouring valleys of the Yeo to the west and Brue to the north. A narrower definition places the limits of the vale close to the county boundary and villages like Bourton, where the landscape transitions to hillier greensand, limestone and sandstone geology. In her book on the Blackmore Vale, Hilary Townsend described the northern boundary as "above Gillingham, through Motcombe to Queen Oak and Bourton, then crosses the A303, ignores the A30 and slips down on winding country roads past Bow Brook and Gibbs Marsh towards Sherborne"; while she placed the western boundary outside the Stour watershed "south of Sherborne down Dancing Hill, across the A352 and pick up the line of the River Yeo towards Beer Hackett, Yetminster and Chetnole".

The River Stour flows out of the vale at Blandford Forum in the southeast, a town sandwiched between the Dorset Downs and Cranborne Chase.

When viewed from above (e.g. from the chalk escarpments) the vale appears quite uniform - a large expanse of green, lush, low-lying land - but in geological terms it comprises alternating belts of different clay and limestone soils (and greensand at the foot of the chalk), which give rise to subtle variations in topography and appearance, and which affect land use. The majority of human settlements are built on the drier strips of limestone, whereas the more poorly draining clays (which comprise the greater bulk of the area) are more sparsely populated, supporting mostly small farms, dotted across the vale. Due to the clay soils, land use is predominantly dairy farming. Until it was closed in 1998, Sturminster Newton livestock market was the busiest weekly livestock market in Britain.

== Cultural associations ==
The vale, in particular the village of Marnhull ("Marlott"), is the opening backdrop for Thomas Hardy's Tess of the D'Urbervilles; he also lived and wrote in Sturminster Newton for a time. William Barnes the poet also lived in Sturminster Newton. Douglas Adams and Robert Boyle lived in Stalbridge for part of their lives.

The New Blackmore Vale Magazine is named for the area.

== Towns and villages ==
Settlements in the vale include:

- Belchalwell
- Bourton
- Child Okeford
- East Stour
- Fiddleford
- Gillingham
- Hazelbury Bryan
- Henstridge
- Hinton St Mary
- Horsington
- Marnhull
- Mere
- Motcombe
- Okeford Fitzpaine
- Shillingstone
- Stalbridge
- Stour Provost
- Stourton Caundle
- Sturminster Newton
- Templecombe
- Todber
- West Stour
- Blandford Forum, Shaftesbury, Sherborne, and Wincanton are on the edges of the vale, but not actually in it.
