= John Hutchins (antiquary) =

English topographer and clergyman

John Hutchins (1698–1773) was a Church of England clergyman and English topographer, who is best known as a county historian of Dorset.

== Life ==
John Hutchins was born at Bradford Peverell, Dorset, on 21 September 1698. He was the son of Richard Hutchins (died 1734), who was for many years curate there, and from 1693 rector of All Saints Church, Dorchester. His mother, Anne, died on 9 April 1707, and was buried in Bradford Peverell church. His early education was under the Rev. William Thornton, master of Dorchester Grammar School, and on 30 May 1718 he matriculated at Hart Hall, Oxford. In the next spring (10 April) he migrated to Balliol College, and graduated B.A. on 18 January 1722, but for some unknown reason became M.A. from Magdalene College, Cambridge, in 1730.

Late in 1722 or early in 1723 he was ordained, and served as curate and usher to George Marsh, who from 1699 to 1737 was vicar of Milton Abbas and the master of its grammar school. In his native county Hutchins remained for the rest of his life. Through the interest of Jacob Bancks of Milton, he was instituted to the rectory of Swyre (Holy Trinity) on 22 August, and to that of Melcombe Horsey in 1733. He became rector of Holy Trinity, Wareham, on 8 March 1744, but he retained the cures of Swyre and Wareham until his death. Political agitation among his parishioners at Wareham involved him in difficulties, and his weak voice and growing deafness diminished his influence in the pulpit.

On Sunday, 25 July 1762, when the town of Wareham was devastated by fire and his rectory-house was burnt to ashes, his topographical papers were rescued by Mrs. Hutchins at the risk of her life. At the end of his days Hutchins was seized by a paralytic stroke, but he still laboured at his history of Dorset.

On 21 June 1773 Hutchins died, and was buried in the church of St. Mary's, Wareham, in the old chapel under its south aisle. A monument on the north wall of the church commemorated his memory. An engraving by John Collimore of a portrait of Hutchins by Cantlo Bestland appeared in Peregrine Bingham's Memoir (1813). Hutchins' library was sold by Thomas Payne in 1774.

== Works ==
Jacob Bancks, his patron, urged Hutchins to compile a county history of Dorset; and Browne Willis, when visiting in 1736, persuaded him to undertake the work. Three years later Hutchins circulated from Milton Abbas a single-sheet folio of six queries, with an appeal for aid, which was drawn up by Willis and printed at his cost. The work dragged for many years, but a handsome subscription encouraged the compiler in 1761 to search the principal libraries and the records in the Tower of London. In 1774, after his death, it was published in two folio volumes as the History and Antiquities of the County of Dorset, but there was prefixed a dedication by Hutchins, dated 1 June 1773. The volumes rose in value. The first volume of a second edition was issued in 1796 and its successor in 1803, but all that was printed of the third volume, with the exception of a single copy preserved in Richard Gough's library at Enfield, and all the unsold copies of vols. i. and ii., were consumed by fire at the printing-house of John Nichols on 8 February 1808. Nichols printed an appeal for support, and in 1813 the third volume appeared with Gough's name as its editor. The fourth volume came out in 1815. On this edition John Bellasis, Hutchins' son-in-law, spent much of his own money.

A further edition was published in four volumes (1861, 1864, 1868, and 1873). It began under the editorship of William Shipp and James Whitworth Hodson; Shipp was sole editor from 1868, and although the prolegomena are dated September 1874 he died on 8 December 1873.

Parts of this history were subsequently issued separately. From the first edition were extracted descriptions of Poole and Stalbridge, and A View of the Principal Towns, Seats, Antiquities in Dorset (1773). Accounts of Milton Abbas, Shaftesbury, and Sherborne were selected from the second edition, and a history from the Blandford division, taken from the last impression, was circulated in 1860. Further use was made in Domesday Book for Dorset by William Bawdwen.

Letters by Hutchins are published in Nichols's Illustrations of Literature and Literary Anecdotes, William Stukeley's Family Memoirs (Surtees Society), and in Notes and Queries, 5th ser. x. 343. Hutchins contributed a memoir of Jacob Bancks to the London Magazine in May 1738.

== Family ==
Hutchins married Anne, daughter of Thomas Stephens, rector of Pimperne, Dorset, at Melcombe Horsey on 21 December 1733; she died on 2 May 1796, aged 87. Their daughter, Anne Martha, married, 3 June 1776, at St. Thomas's (now the cathedral), Bombay, John Bellasis, then major of artillery in the service of the East India Company at Bombay, and afterwards major-general and commander of the forces at Bombay. She died at Bombay on 14 May 1797, and her husband on 11 February 1808.

== Notes ==
Attribution

This article incorporates text from a publication now in the public domain: "Hutchins, John". Dictionary of National Biography. London: Smith, Elder & Co. 1885–1900.
