= List of civil parishes in Dorset =

This is a list of civil parishes in the ceremonial county of Dorset, England. There are 269 civil parishes.

== Bournemouth, Christchurch and Poole ==
The former Bournemouth County Borough was mostly unparished and the former Poole Municipal Borough was entirely unparished. However, town and parish councils for Bournemouth, Poole and Broadstone were formed in April 2026 with the first elections due to take place in May 2026.

Civil parish	Population 2011	Area (km^{2}) 2011	Pre 1974 district	Former district
Bournemouth			Bournemouth County Borough	Bournemouth
Broadstone			Poole Municipal Borough	Poole
Burton and Winkton	4,177	8.68	Ringwood and Fordingbridge Rural District	Christchurch
Christchurch	31,372		Christchurch Municipal Borough	Christchurch
Poole			Poole Municipal Borough	Poole
Throop and Holdenhurst	308		County Borough of Bournemouth	Bournemouth
Highcliffe and Walkford	10,007		Christchurch Municipal Borough	Christchurch
Hurn	501	22.35	Ringwood and Fordingbridge Rural District	Christchurch

== Dorset ==
Population figures are unavailable for some of the smallest parishes.

Civil parish	Population 2011	Area (km^{2}) 2011	Pre 1974 district	Former district
Abbotsbury	481	18.19	Dorchester Rural District	West Dorset
Affpuddle and Turnerspuddle	436	22.79	Wareham and Purbeck Rural District	Purbeck
Alderholt	3,171	15.22	Wimborne and Cranborne Rural District	East Dorset
Alton Pancras	175	9.21	Dorchester Rural District	West Dorset
Anderson			Blandford Rural District	North Dorset
Arne	1,297	24.88	Wareham and Purbeck Rural District	Purbeck
Ashmore	188	9.60	Shaftesbury Rural District	North Dorset
Askerswell	154	6.99	Bridport Rural District	West Dorset
Athelhampton and Puddletown			Dorchester Rural District	West Dorset
Batcombe			Sherborne Rural District	West Dorset
Beaminster (town)	3,136	24.29	Beaminster Rural District	West Dorset
Beer Hackett			Sherborne Rural District	West Dorset
Bere Regis	1,745	33.20	Wareham and Purbeck Rural District	Purbeck
Bettiscombe			Beaminster Rural District	West Dorset
Bincombe	514	7.87	Dorchester Rural District	West Dorset
Bishop's Caundle	398	3.87	Sherborne Rural District	West Dorset
Blandford Forum (town)	10,325	8.47	Blandford Forum Municipal Borough	North Dorset
Blandford St Mary	1,511	9.71	Blandford Rural District	North Dorset
Bloxworth	200	10.86	Wareham and Purbeck Rural District	Purbeck
Bourton	822	3.72	Shaftesbury Rural District	North Dorset
Bradford Abbas	975	9.49	Sherborne Rural District	West Dorset
Bradford Peverell	370	10.75	Dorchester Rural District	West Dorset
Bridport (town)	8,332	3.19	Bridport Municipal Borough	West Dorset
Broadmayne	1,204	6.45	Dorchester Rural District	West Dorset
Broadwindsor	1,378	30.52	Beaminster Rural District	West Dorset
Bryanston	925	7.15	Blandford Rural District	North Dorset
Buckhorn Weston	356	6.85	Shaftesbury Rural District	North Dorset
Buckland Newton	622	17.00	Dorchester Rural District	West Dorset
Burleston and Tolpuddle			Dorchester Rural District	West Dorset
Burstock	120	3.76	Beaminster Rural District	West Dorset
Burton Bradstock	948	10.97	Bridport Rural District	West Dorset
Cann	822	9.30	Shaftesbury Rural District	North Dorset
Castleton	155	20.94	Sherborne Rural District	West Dorset
Catherston Leweston			Bridport Rural District	West Dorset
Cattistock	509	15.04	Dorchester Rural District	West Dorset
Caundle Marsh			Sherborne Rural District	West Dorset
Cerne Abbas	784	17.28	Dorchester Rural District	West Dorset
Chalbury	143	3.32	Wimborne and Cranborne Rural District	East Dorset
Chaldon Herring	140	12.53	Wareham and Purbeck Rural District	Purbeck
Charlton Marshall	1,156	9.29	Blandford Rural District	North Dorset
Charminster	2,940	17.71	Dorchester Rural District	West Dorset
Charmouth	1,352	2.78	Bridport Rural District	West Dorset
Chedington			Beaminster Rural District	West Dorset
Cheselbourne	296	12.48	Dorchester Rural District	West Dorset
Chetnole	344	5.78	Sherborne Rural District	West Dorset
Chettle			Blandford Rural District	North Dorset
Chickerell (town)	5,515	13.96	Dorchester Rural District	West Dorset
Chideock	686	11.98	Bridport Rural District	West Dorset
Chilcombe			Bridport Rural District	West Dorset
Child Okeford	1,114	6.36	Sturminster Rural District	North Dorset
Chilfrome			Dorchester Rural District	West Dorset
Church Knowle	261	11.80	Wareham and Purbeck Rural District	Purbeck
Clifton Maybank			Sherborne Rural District	West Dorset
Colehill	6,907	9.69	Wimborne and Cranborne Rural District	East Dorset
Compton Abbas	216	6.04	Shaftesbury Rural District	North Dorset
Compton Valence			Dorchester Rural District	West Dorset
Coombe Keynes			Wareham and Purbeck Rural District	Purbeck
Corfe Castle	1,355	37.26	Wareham and Purbeck Rural District	Purbeck
Corfe Mullen	10,133	12.27	Wimborne and Cranborne Rural District	East Dorset
Corscombe	445	20.26	Beaminster Rural District	West Dorset
Cranborne	779	17.88	Wimborne and Cranborne Rural District	East Dorset
Crichel	246	16.21	Wimborne and Cranborne Rural District	East Dorset
Crossways	2,267	6.70	Dorchester Rural District	West Dorset
Dewlish	284	8.61	Dorchester Rural District	West Dorset
Dorchester (town)	19,060	7.12	Dorchester Municipal Borough	West Dorset
Durweston	398	7.48	Blandford Rural District	North Dorset
East Chelborough			Beaminster Rural District	West Dorset
East Holme			Wareham and Purbeck Rural District	Purbeck
East Lulworth	246	17.48	Wareham and Purbeck Rural District	Purbeck
East Orchard	223	8.32	Shaftesbury Rural District	North Dorset
East Stoke	504	23.04	Wareham and Purbeck Rural District	Purbeck
East Stour	573	7.22	Shaftesbury Rural District	North Dorset
Edmondsham	188	7.28	Wimborne and Cranborne Rural District	East Dorset
Evershot	334	12.64	Beaminster Rural District	West Dorset
Farnham	183	5.75	Blandford Rural District	North Dorset
Ferndown Town (town)	17,839	20.36	Wimborne and Cranborne Rural District	East Dorset
Fifehead Magdalen			Sturminster Rural District	North Dorset
Fifehead Neville	147	5.48	Sturminster Rural District	North Dorset
Fleet			Dorchester Rural District	West Dorset
Folke	339	11.27	Sherborne Rural District	West Dorset
Fontmell Magna	734	11.72	Shaftesbury Rural District	North Dorset
Frampton	524	13.32	Dorchester Rural District	West Dorset
Frome St Quintin	171	5.46	Dorchester Rural District	West Dorset
Frome Vauchurch	149	1.97	Dorchester Rural District	West Dorset
Gillingham (town)	11,756	31.29	Shaftesbury Rural District	North Dorset
Glanvilles Wootton	196	6.90	Sturminster Rural District	North Dorset
Goathill			Sherborne Rural District	West Dorset
Godmanstone	156	8.18	Dorchester Rural District	West Dorset
Gussage All Saints	208	9.99	Wimborne and Cranborne Rural District	East Dorset
Gussage St. Michael	211	9.96	Wimborne and Cranborne Rural District	East Dorset
Halstock	546	12.99	Beaminster Rural District	West Dorset
Hammoon			Sturminster Rural District	North Dorset
Hanford			Sturminster Rural District	North Dorset
Haydon			Sherborne Rural District	West Dorset
Hazelbury Bryan	1,059	9.76	Sturminster Rural District	North Dorset
Hermitage			Sherborne Rural District	West Dorset
Hilfield	324	19.08	Sherborne Rural District	West Dorset
Hilton	477	12.31	Blandford Rural District	North Dorset
Hinton St Mary	240	4.33	Sturminster Rural District	North Dorset
Hinton	409	8.19	Wimborne and Cranborne Rural District	East Dorset
Holnest	342	17.86	Sherborne Rural District	West Dorset
Holt	1,273	22.21	Wimborne and Cranborne Rural District	East Dorset
Holwell	369	9.80	Sherborne Rural District	West Dorset
Hooke	157	5.08	Beaminster Rural District	West Dorset
Horton	461	9.27	Wimborne and Cranborne Rural District	East Dorset
Ibberton	101	5.59	Sturminster Rural District	North Dorset
Iwerne Courtney or Shroton	541	13.76	Blandford Rural District	North Dorset
Iwerne Minster	978	11.54	Shaftesbury Rural District	North Dorset
Iwerne Stepleton			Blandford Rural District	North Dorset
Kimmeridge			Wareham and Purbeck Rural District	Purbeck
Kington Magna	389	8.06	Shaftesbury Rural District	North Dorset
Langton Herring	240	7.83	Dorchester Rural District	West Dorset
Langton Long Blandford			Blandford Rural District	North Dorset
Langton Matravers	853	8.98	Wareham and Purbeck Rural District	Purbeck
Leigh	480	8.20	Sherborne Rural District	West Dorset
Leweston			Sherborne Rural District	West Dorset
Lillington			Sherborne Rural District	West Dorset
Littlebredy	121	11.25	Dorchester Rural District	West Dorset
Litton Cheney	359	8.21	Bridport Rural District	West Dorset
Loders	518	9.21	Bridport Rural District	West Dorset
Long Bredy and Kingston Russell			Dorchester Rural District	West Dorset
Longburton	470	4.21	Sherborne Rural District	West Dorset
Lydlinch	437	13.74	Sturminster Rural District	North Dorset
Lyme Regis (town)	3,671	5.01	Lyme Regis Municipal Borough	West Dorset
Lytchett Matravers	3,424	13.80	Wareham and Purbeck Rural District	Purbeck
Lytchett Minster and Upton	7,983	14.49	Wareham and Purbeck Rural District	Purbeck
Maiden Newton	1,119	11.70	Dorchester Rural District	West Dorset
Manston	225	8.36	Sturminster Rural District	North Dorset
Mapperton			Beaminster Rural District	West Dorset
Mappowder	166	7.69	Sturminster Rural District	North Dorset
Margaret Marsh			Shaftesbury Rural District	North Dorset
Marnhull	1,998	15.51	Sturminster Rural District	North Dorset
Marshwood	346	17.78	Beaminster Rural District	West Dorset
Melbury Abbas	305	9.58	Shaftesbury Rural District	North Dorset
Melbury Bubb			Sherborne Rural District	West Dorset
Melbury Osmond	199	9.16	Beaminster Rural District	West Dorset
Melbury Sampford			Beaminster Rural District	West Dorset
Melcombe Horsey	141	8.52	Dorchester Rural District	West Dorset
Milborne St Andrew	1,062	10.66	Blandford Rural District	North Dorset
Milton Abbas	755	17.67	Blandford Rural District	North Dorset
Minterne Magna	184	10.08	Dorchester Rural District	West Dorset
Morden	323	14.87	Wareham and Purbeck Rural District	Purbeck
Moreton	373	8.72	Wareham and Purbeck Rural District	Purbeck
Mosterton	604	4.62	Beaminster Rural District	West Dorset
Motcombe	1,474	19.73	Shaftesbury Rural District	North Dorset
Nether Cerne			Dorchester Rural District	West Dorset
Nether Compton	328	3.87	Sherborne Rural District	West Dorset
Netherbury	1,314	25.40	Beaminster Rural District	West Dorset
North Poorton			Beaminster Rural District	West Dorset
North Wootton			Sherborne Rural District	West Dorset
Oborne	101	2.46	Sherborne Rural District	West Dorset
Okeford Fitzpaine	913	15.13	Sturminster Rural District	North Dorset
Osmington	673	8.95	Dorchester Rural District	West Dorset
Over Compton	183	2.78	Sherborne Rural District	West Dorset
Owermoigne	467	14.57	Dorchester Rural District	West Dorset
Pamphill	658	23.78	Wimborne and Cranborne Rural District	East Dorset
Piddlehinton	403	11.81	Dorchester Rural District	West Dorset
Piddletrenthide	647	25.54	Dorchester Rural District	West Dorset
Pilsdon			Beaminster Rural District	West Dorset
Pimperne	1,109	12.42	Blandford Rural District	North Dorset
Portesham	685	18.25	Dorchester Rural District	West Dorset
Portland (town)	12,844	12.09	Portland Urban District	Weymouth and Portland
Powerstock	358	19.53	Beaminster Rural District	West Dorset
Poxwell			Dorchester Rural District	West Dorset
Poyntington	128	4.12	Sherborne Rural District	West Dorset
Pulham	269	9.77	Sturminster Rural District	North Dorset
Puncknowle	466	9.48	Bridport Rural District	West Dorset
Purse Caundle	221	12.03	Sherborne Rural District	West Dorset
Rampisham	163	12.39	Beaminster Rural District	West Dorset
Ryme Intrinseca	115	4.70	Sherborne Rural District	West Dorset
Sandford Orcas	180	5.75	Sherborne Rural District	West Dorset
Seaborough			Beaminster Rural District	West Dorset
Shaftesbury (town)	7,314	4.49	Shaftesbury Municipal Borough	North Dorset
Shapwick	199	10.86	Wimborne and Cranborne Rural District	East Dorset
Sherborne (town)	9,523	6.68	Sherborne Urban District	West Dorset
Shillingstone	1,170	9.19	Sturminster Rural District	North Dorset
Shipton Gorge	381	7.74	Bridport Rural District	West Dorset
Silton	123	4.95	Shaftesbury Rural District	North Dorset
Sixpenny Handley and Pentridge	1,428	35.94	Wimborne and Cranborne Rural District	East Dorset
South Perrott	367	8.91	Beaminster Rural District	West Dorset
Spetisbury	555	9.10	Blandford Rural District	North Dorset
St Leonards and St Ives	6,859	24.81	Ringwood and Fordingbridge Rural District	East Dorset
Stalbridge (town)	2,698	23.63	Sturminster Rural District	North Dorset
Stanton St Gabriel			Bridport Rural District	West Dorset
Steeple with Tyneham	206	29.65	Wareham and Purbeck Rural District	Purbeck
Stinsford	334	13.50	Dorchester Rural District	West Dorset
Stockwood			Sherborne Rural District	West Dorset
Stoke Abbott	238	12.10	Beaminster Rural District	West Dorset
Stoke Wake			Sturminster Rural District	North Dorset
Stour Provost	579	11.39	Shaftesbury Rural District	North Dorset
Stourpaine	617	9.58	Blandford Rural District	North Dorset
Stourton Caundle	439	8.26	Sturminster Rural District	North Dorset
Stratton	592	6.93	Dorchester Rural District	West Dorset
Studland	425	20.62	Wareham and Purbeck Rural District	Purbeck
Sturminster Marshall	1,969	20.85	Wimborne and Cranborne Rural District	East Dorset
Sturminster Newton (town)	4,292	18.39	Sturminster Rural District	North Dorset
Sutton Waldron	200	4.65	Shaftesbury Rural District	North Dorset
Swanage (town)	9,601	11.21	Swanage Urban District	Purbeck
Swyre	102	4.56	Bridport Rural District	West Dorset
Sydling St Nicholas	414	20.75	Dorchester Rural District	West Dorset
Symondsbury	1,059	15.28	Bridport Rural District	West Dorset
Tarrant Crawford			Blandford Rural District	North Dorset
Tarrant Gunville	233	14.02	Blandford Rural District	North Dorset
Tarrant Hinton	280	13.16	Blandford Rural District	North Dorset
Tarrant Keyneston	310	5.45	Blandford Rural District	North Dorset
Tarrant Launceston	498	6.44	Blandford Rural District	North Dorset
Tarrant Monkton	1,986	8.62	Blandford Rural District	North Dorset
Tarrant Rawston			Blandford Rural District	North Dorset
Tarrant Rushton	166	13.40	Blandford Rural District	North Dorset
Thorncombe	687	22.80	Beaminster Rural District	West Dorset
Thornford	939	9.63	Sherborne Rural District	West Dorset
Tincleton	236	9.11	Dorchester Rural District	West Dorset
Todber	140	1.53	Shaftesbury Rural District	North Dorset
Toller Fratrum			Dorchester Rural District	West Dorset
Toller Porcorum	307	12.82	Dorchester Rural District	West Dorset
Trent	317	6.53	Sherborne Rural District	West Dorset
Turnworth			Blandford Rural District	North Dorset
Up Cerne			Dorchester Rural District	West Dorset
Verwood (town)	14,852	17.52	Wimborne and Cranborne Rural District	East Dorset
Wareham St. Martin	2,774	29.77	Wareham and Purbeck Rural District	Purbeck
Wareham Town (town)	5,496	6.35	Wareham Municipal Borough	Purbeck
Warmwell	161	9.16	Dorchester Rural District	West Dorset
West Chelborough			Beaminster Rural District	West Dorset
West Compton			Dorchester Rural District	West Dorset
West Knighton	375	6.57	Dorchester Rural District	West Dorset
West Lulworth	714	10.42	Wareham and Purbeck Rural District	Purbeck
West Moors	7,561	8.54	Wimborne and Cranborne Rural District	East Dorset
West Orchard			Shaftesbury Rural District	North Dorset
West Parley	3,585	4.52	Wimborne and Cranborne Rural District	East Dorset
West Stafford	291	4.00	Dorchester Rural District	West Dorset
West Stour	271	8.15	Shaftesbury Rural District	North Dorset
Whitcombe			Dorchester Rural District	West Dorset
Whitchurch Canonicorum	684	17.43	Bridport Rural District	West Dorset
Wimborne Minster (town)	6,790	2.64	Wimborne Minster Urban District	East Dorset
Wimborne St Giles	377	24.04	Wimborne and Cranborne Rural District	East Dorset
Winfrith Newburgh	669	16.02	Wareham and Purbeck Rural District	Purbeck
Winterborne Came			Dorchester Rural District	West Dorset
Winterborne Clenston			Blandford Rural District	North Dorset
Winterborne Herringston	174	17.41	Dorchester Rural District	West Dorset
Winterborne Houghton	183	7.98	Blandford Rural District	North Dorset
Winterborne Kingston	643	11.27	Blandford Rural District	North Dorset
Winterborne Monkton			Dorchester Rural District	West Dorset
Winterborne St Martin	755	14.37	Dorchester Rural District	West Dorset
Winterborne Stickland	653	18.62	Blandford Rural District	North Dorset
Winterborne Whitechurch	757	13.89	Blandford Rural District	North Dorset
Winterborne Zelston	203	7.78	Blandford Rural District	North Dorset
Winterbourne Abbas	355	6.12	Dorchester Rural District	West Dorset
Winterbourne Steepleton	297	7.40	Dorchester Rural District	West Dorset
Witchampton	398	8.54	Wimborne and Cranborne Rural District	East Dorset
Woodlands	522	10.49	Wimborne and Cranborne Rural District	East Dorset
Woodsford			Dorchester Rural District	West Dorset
Wool	5,310	14.71	Wareham and Purbeck Rural District	Purbeck
Woolland	130	9.00	Sturminster Rural District	North Dorset
Wootton Fitzpaine	345	14.45	Bridport Rural District	West Dorset
Worth Matravers	638	10.96	Wareham and Purbeck Rural District	Purbeck
Wraxall			Beaminster Rural District	West Dorset
Wynford Eagle	186	18.08	Dorchester Rural District	West Dorset
Yetminster	1,105	5.98	Sherborne Rural District	West Dorset

== See also ==
- List of civil parishes in England
