= Tarrant =

Tarrant may refer to:

== Places ==
=== United Kingdom ===
- River Tarrant, a river in Dorset, after which several villages are named:
  - Tarrant Crawford, Dorset
  - Tarrant Gunville, Dorset
  - Tarrant Hinton, Dorset
  - Tarrant Keyneston, Dorset
  - Tarrant Launceston, Dorset
  - Tarrant Monkton, Dorset
  - Tarrant Rawston, Dorset
  - Tarrant Rushton, Dorset
- Tarrant Abbey, Dorset
- Hill Forts and Upper Tarrants (ward)
- Hurstbourne Tarrant, Hampshire, with associations to Tarrant Abbey

=== United States ===
- Tarrant, Alabama
- Tarrant, Wisconsin
- Tarrant County, Texas

== People ==
- Ambrose Tarrant (1866–1938), Australian cricketer
- Blair Tarrant (born 1990), New Zealand field hockey player
- Brenton Tarrant (born 1990), Australian mass shooter
- Chris Tarrant (born 1946), British radio broadcaster and television presenter
- Chris Tarrant (footballer) (born 1980), Australian footballer
- Colin Tarrant (1952–2012), British actor
- Dick Tarrant (born 1931), American basketball coach
- Dorothy Tarrant (1885–1973), professor of Greek
- Frank Tarrant (1880–1951), Australian cricketer
- George Tarrant (1838–1870), English cricketer
- George Tarrant Sr. (1838–1904), American politician
- Ingrid Tarrant (born 1954), English television presenter
- Jeffrey Tarrant (1956-2019), American businessman
- John Tarrant (athlete) (1932–1975), English long-distance runner
- John Tarrant (bishop) (1952-2020), American Episcopal Bishop
- Louis Tarrant (1903–?), Australian cricketer
- Margaret Tarrant (1888–1959), English illustrator and children's author
- R. J. Tarrant, American classicist
- Richard Tarrant (politician) (1942–2025), American businessman and politician
- Robbie Tarrant (born 1989), Australian footballer
- Shawn Z. Tarrant (born 1965), American politician
- Tom Tarrant (1931–2017), Australian footballer
- Walter George Tarrant (1875–1942), English developer and builder
- William Tarrant (?–1872), British Hong Kong civil servant and journalist

== Fictional characters ==
- Del Tarrant, a character from Blake's 7, played by Steven Pacey

== See also ==
- Tarrant automobile, the first petrol engine motor car built in Australia in 1901
