= Hill Forts and Upper Tarrants =

Electoral ward in Dorset, England

- ward Dorset Council
- Population: 4,747
- Major settlements: Tarrant Gunville, Pimperne, Stourpaine

Current ward
- Created: 2019
- Councillor: Sherry Jespersen (Conservative)
- Number of councillors: 1

Hill Forts and Upper Tarrants is an electoral ward in Dorset, England. Since the 2019 Dorset Council election, it has elected one councillor to Dorset Council.

== Geography ==
The Hill Forts and Upper Tarrants ward is rural, covering a small part of the Blackmore Vale and part of the Tarrant Valley on Cranborne Chase – including the iron age hillforts at Hambledon Hill and Hod Hill – north of Blandford Forum. It is composed of the civil parishes of Bryanston, Chettle, Child Okeford, Durweston, Farnham, Hanford, Pimperne, Stourpaine, Tarrant Gunville and Tarrant Hinton.

== Councillors ==
Election	Councillors
2019	Sherry Jespersen (Conservative)
2024	Sherry Jespersen (Conservative)

== Election ==
=== 2019 Dorset Council election ===
2019 Dorset Council election: Hill Forts and Upper Tarrants (1 seat)
Party	Candidate	Votes	%	±%
Conservative	Sherry Jespersen	854	60.5	
Liberal Democrats	Joe Hickish	336	23.8	
Labour	Alan Cross	221	15.7	
Majority				
Turnout			40.00	
Conservative win (new seat)				

=== 2024 Dorset Council election ===
2024 Dorset Council election: Hill Forts and Upper Tarrants (1 seat)
Party	Candidate	Votes	%	±%
Conservative	Sherry Jesperson*	709	55.4	−5.1
Liberal Democrats	Joseph Roger Hickish	251	19.6	−4.2
Labour	Alan Cross	168	13.1	−2.6
Green	Keith Yarwood	151	11.8	New
Turnout		1,279	36.47	
Conservative hold		Swing		

== See also ==
- List of electoral wards in Dorset
