= Beaminster Rural District =

Former rural district in Dorset, England

Coordinates: 50.80923°N 2.73855°W

Beaminster
- Rural district
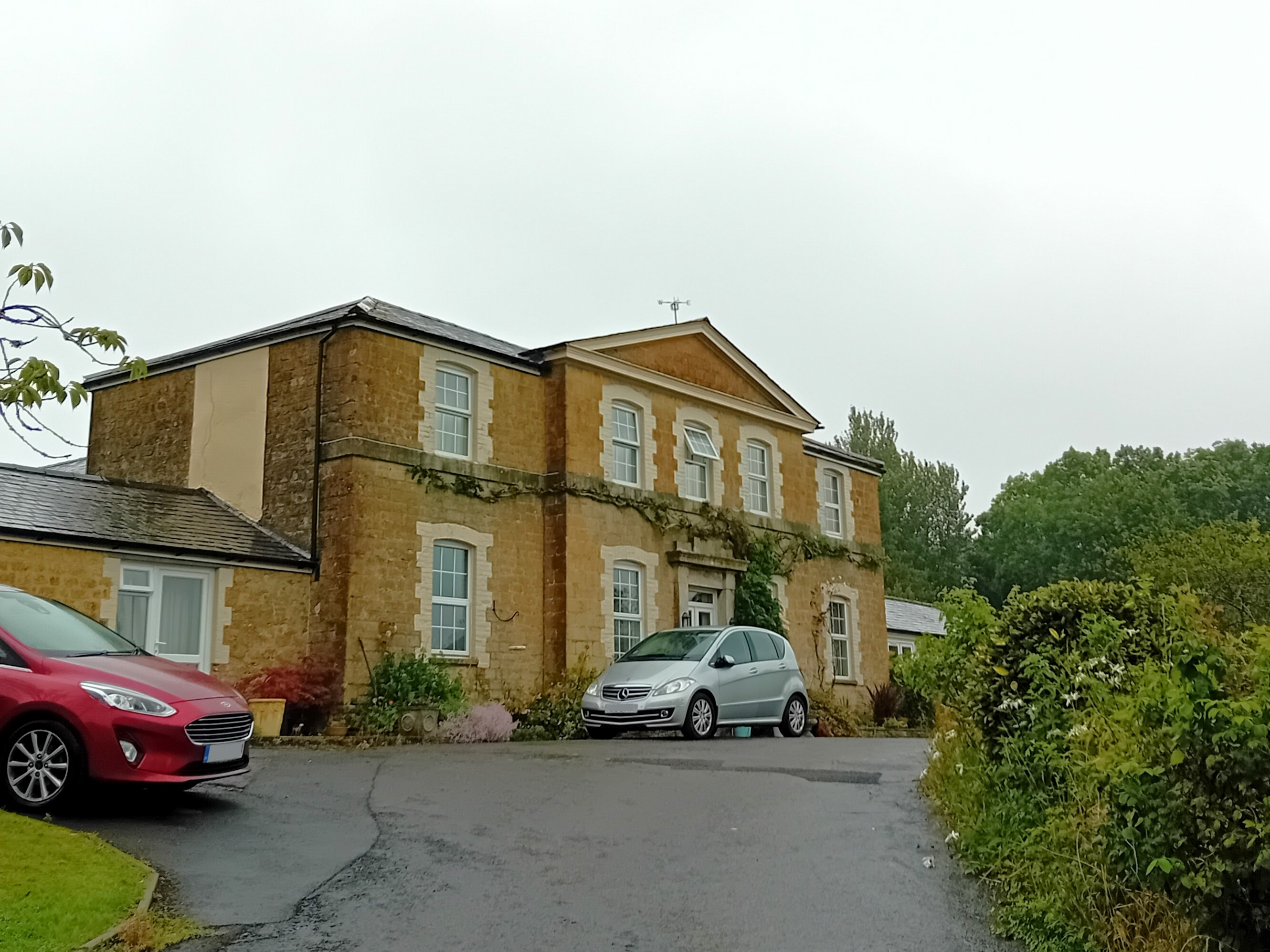
- Beaminster Union Workhouse: Council's original meeting place
- Area
  - 1971: 24,235 hectares (59,890 acres)
- Population
  - 1901: 9,184
  - 1971: 8,297
- History
  - Created: 28 December 1894
  - Abolished: 31 March 1974
  - Succeeded by: West Dorset
- Status: Rural district
  - HQ: Beaminster

Beaminster Rural District was a rural district in the administrative county of Dorset, England from 1894 to 1974, covering an area in the west of the county around the small town of Beaminster.

== Origins ==
The district had its origins in the Beaminster Poor Law Union, which had been created in 1836, covering Beaminster itself and several surrounding parishes. In 1872 sanitary districts were established, giving public health and local government responsibilities for rural areas to the existing boards of guardians of poor law unions. The Beaminster Rural Sanitary District was administered from Beaminster Union Workhouse, which had been completed in 1838 at Stoke Water, about a mile south-west of Beaminster itself, in the neighbouring parish of Stoke Abbott.

Under the Local Government Act 1894, rural sanitary districts became rural districts from 28 December 1894 with their own elected councils. The 1894 Act also specified that boundaries should be adjusted to avoid having districts straddle county boundaries. The Beaminster Rural Sanitary District was mostly in Dorset but also included the Somerset parishes of Misterton and Seaborough. Misterton was therefore transferred to the Chard Rural District on the day the new rural districts came into force, whilst Seaborough was transferred from Somerset to Dorset in September 1895, such that Beaminster Rural District was thereafter entirely in Dorset. The parish of Thorncombe was similarly transferred into the Beaminster Rural District in 1895, having been one of the few Dorset parishes in the Axminster Rural Sanitary District prior to 1894, which was mostly in Devon.

Beaminster Rural District Council held its first meeting on 3 January 1895 at the workhouse. The first chairman was Edward Gapper Legg, who had also been the chairman of the Beaminster Board of Guardians for some years previously.

== Civil parishes ==
The parishes within the district were:

- Beaminster
- Bettiscombe
- Broadwindsor
- Burstock
- Chedington
- Corscombe
- East Chelborough
- Evershot
- Halstock
- Hooke
- Mapperton
- Marshwood
- Melbury Osmond
- Melbury Sampford
- Mosterton
- Netherbury
- North Poorton
- Pilsdon
- Powerstock
- Rampisham
- Seaborough
- South Perrott
- Stoke Abbott
- Thorncombe (from 1895)
- West Chelborough
- Wraxall

== Premises ==
The council was initially based at the workhouse at Stoke Waters, continuing to meet there until at least the 1930s. It subsequently acquired a building which had previously been The Swan public house at 6 Fleet Street in the centre of Beaminster, renaming it Town Offices. The building then served as the council's meeting place and offices until its abolition in 1974.

== Abolition ==
Beaminster Rural District was abolished in 1974 under the Local Government Act 1972, with the area becoming part of the new district of West Dorset.
