= Whiteway Hundred =

Former administrative division in Dorset, England

Coordinates: 50.790°N 2.265°W

Whiteway Hundred was a hundred in the English county of Dorset, containing the following parishes:

- Cheselbourne
- Hilton
- Ibberton
- Melcombe Horsey
- Milton Abbas
- Stoke Wake
- Woolland

== See also ==
- List of hundreds in Dorset

== Sources ==
- Boswell, Edward, 1833: The Civil Division of the County of Dorset (published on CD by Archive CD Books Ltd, 1992)
- Hutchins, John, History of Dorset, vols 1-4 (3rd ed 1861–70; reprinted by EP Publishing, Wakefield, 1973)
- Mills, A. D., 1977, 1980, 1989: Place Names of Dorset, parts 1–3. English Place Name Society: Survey of English Place Names vols LII, LIII and 59/60
