= Stoke Wake =

Hamlet in Dorset, England

Coordinates: 50.8571°N 2.3374°W

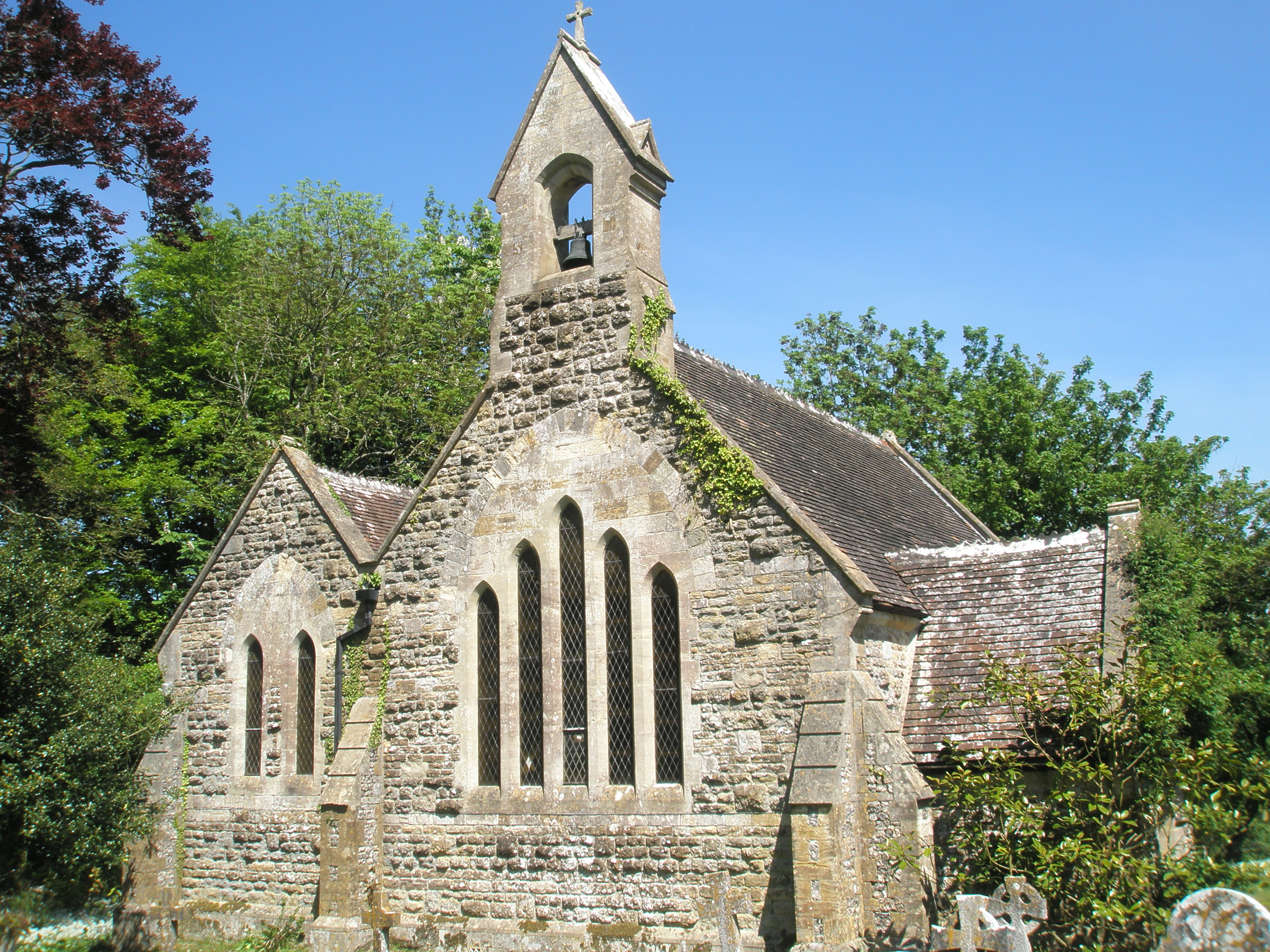
- All Saints, Stoke Wake

- Location within Dorset
- Population: 60
- OS grid reference: ST764063
- Civil parish: Stoke Wake
- Unitary authority: Dorset
- Ceremonial county: Dorset
- Region: South West
- Country: England
- Sovereign state: United Kingdom
- Post town: Blandford Forum
- Postcode district: DT11
- Police: Dorset
- Fire: Dorset and Wiltshire
- Ambulance: South Western
- UK Parliament: North Dorset

Stoke Wake is a hamlet and civil parish, formerly part of the Whiteway hundred in north Dorset, England. It is situated under Bulbarrow Hill on the edge of the Blackmore Vale, west of Blandford Forum. Dorset County Council's 2013 mid-year estimate of the parish population is 60.

In 1086 Stoke Wake was recorded in the Domesday Book as Stoche; it had 15 households, 4 ploughlands, 15 acres (6 hectares) of meadow and one mill. It was in the hundred of Hilton and the lord and tenant-in-chief was Shaftesbury Abbey.

The parish church was built in 1872.
