= St Mary the Virgin, Tarrant Crawford =

Church in Dorset, England

St Mary the Virgin
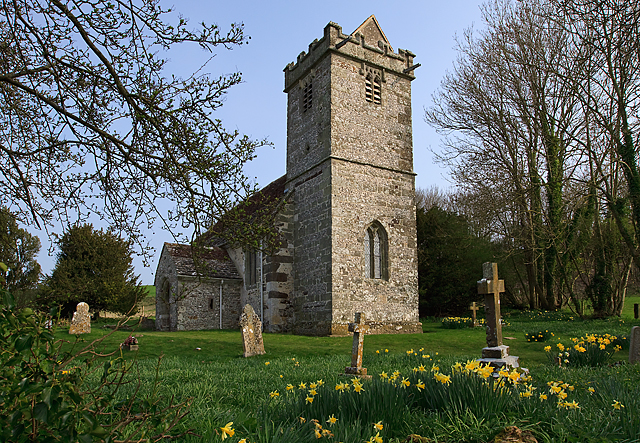
- The church in 2011

- Location within Dorset
- 50°49′50.6″N 2°06′38.6″W
- Location: Tarrant Crawford, Dorset, England

History
- Built: 12th century

Listed Building – Grade I
- Official name: Church of St Mary
- Designated: 26 June 1953
- Reference no.: 1110840

The Church of St Mary the Virgin in Tarrant Crawford, Dorset, England, was built in the 12th century. It is recorded in the National Heritage List for England as a designated Grade I listed building, and is now a redundant church in the care of the Churches Conservation Trust. It was vested in the Trust on 1 July 1988.

The church is all that remains of Tarrant Abbey, for which it may have been a lay church. The Abbey was founded in the 13th century by Ralph de Kahaines (of nearby Tarrant Keyneston) as a Cistercian nunnery.

The flint chancel, dates from the 12th century, with the nave, tower and porch being built in the 14th century. The 15th-century tower houses three bells, two of them medieval and one 17th century. The nave roof added in the early 16th century. In 1911 a major restoration of the church was undertaken.

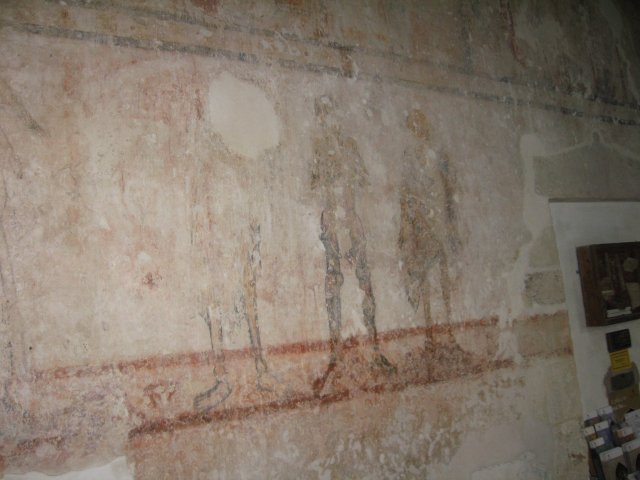
Murals

The interior includes several coffin lids from the 13th century. These have been moved from the Abbey and may relate to two of the famous people associated with it. The first is Queen Joan, the wife of Alexander II of Scotland and daughter of King John of England (Richard I's brother and successor) who is buried in the grave yard (supposedly in a golden coffin). The second is Bishop Richard Poore, builder of Salisbury Cathedral, who was baptised in the abbey church and later (in 1237) buried in the abbey, which he founded. He was at one time Dean of the old cathedral at Old Sarum, and later became bishop of first Chichester, then Salisbury and finally Durham.

There are also 15th century stained glass, a font from the 16th century and an octagonal pulpit pews with moulded panelling from the 17th century. Mediaeval wall paintings cover most of the walls of the nave and chancel, dating from the 13th and 14th centuries. One set of pictures depicts the acts of St Margaret of Antioch. The Annunciation dates from the 14th century and shows the winged figure of Gabriel and the virgin. The south wall has two rows of paintings one above the other. The lower set show three kings or princes, and three skeletons, which are believed to represent "the emptiness of earthly rank and riches".

Attendance at the church fell after World War II and it was declared redundant becoming the responsibility of the Churches Conservation Trust in 1988. £100,000 was spent on masonry repairs and make it weather-proof. Another £68,000 was spent between 2003 and 2007 to improve the drainage, eradicate death watch beetle and stabilise and re-roof the tower.

== See also ==
- List of churches preserved by the Churches Conservation Trust in South West England
