= River Divelish =

River in Dorset, England

Coordinates: 50°56′08″N 2°19′04″W

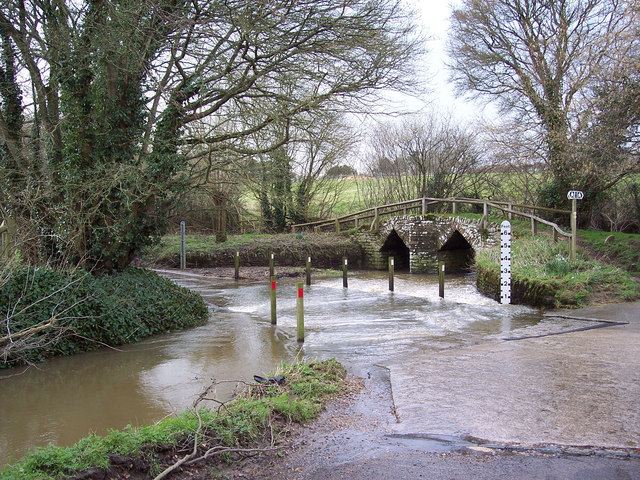
Ford through the Divelish with adjacent packhorse bridge near Fifehead Neville

The River Divelish is a Dorset watercourse of that rises on the north slope of Bulbarrow Hill, near to the source of the Devil's Brook. It is a tributary of the River Stour, which it joins upstream of Sturminster Newton. The Stour, in turn, discharges into the English Channel.

Its length is 6 miles (9.7 km).

== See also ==
- List of rivers of England
