= Luccombe =

Luccombe may refer to the following places in England:

- Luccombe, Isle of Wight
- Luccombe, Somerset
- East Chelborough, Dorset, also known as Luccombe
