= Devils Brook (Dorset) =

Stream in Dorset, England

Coordinates: 50°44′51″N 2°19′21″W

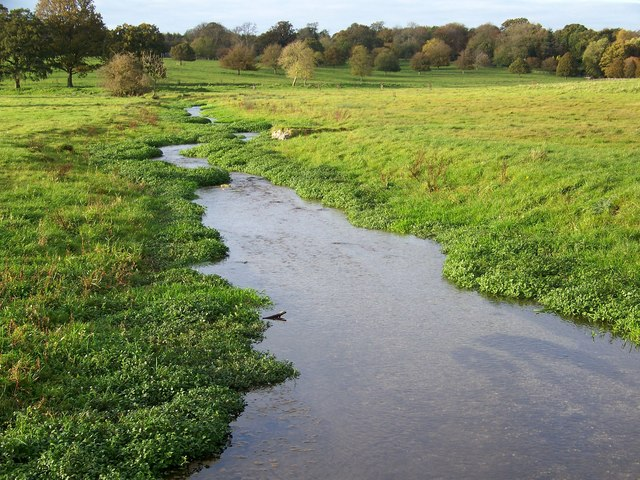
The Devils Brook near Dewlish

The Devils Brook is a Dorset chalk stream which rises near Higher Ansty (on Pleck Farm, in Pleck or Little Ansty), near to the source of the River Divelish. It flows past Dewlish (to which it lent its name) and joins the River Piddle at Athelhampton, which in turn flows into Poole Harbour.

Its length is given variously from 6 miles (9.7 km) to 9.16 miles (14.74 km). The river has a catchment area of 3,364.34 hectares (8,313.5 acres).

== See also ==
- List of rivers of England
