= Tarrant Abbey =

Abbey in Tarrant Crawford, Dorset, England

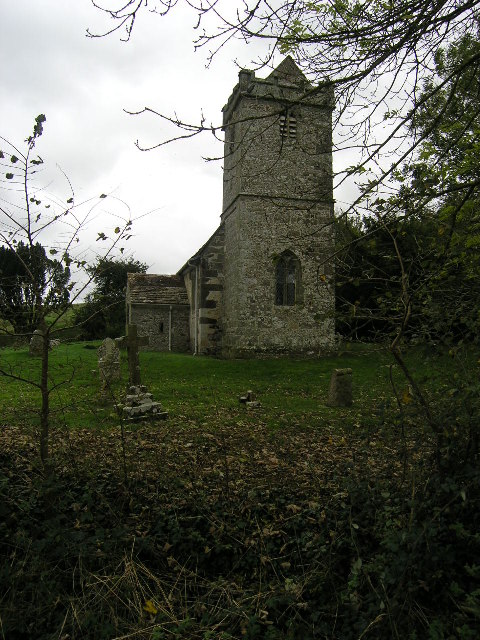
- St Mary's Church

- Location within Dorset
- Interactive map of Tarrant Abbey

Monastery information
- Full name: The abbey of St Mary and All Saints
- Order: Cistercian
- Established: 1186
- Disestablished: 1539

People
- Founder: Ralph de Kahaines
- Important associated figures: Queen Joan, Bishop Richard Poore

Architecture
- Heritage designation: Scheduled Monument 1002715 - ruins Grade I listed building 1110840 - church
- Designated date: 26 June 1963

Site
- Location: Tarrant Crawford, Dorset
- Coordinates: 50.831431°N 2.122276°W

Tarrant Abbey was a Cistercian nunnery in Tarrant Crawford, Dorset, England.

== History ==
The abbey was founded as an independent monastery in 1186 by Ralph de Kahaines (of nearby Tarrant Keyneston) and has been identified as a possible site of "Camestrum", referred to by Gervase of Canterbury. The abbey was then re-founded in either 1228 or 1233 as a Cistercian nunnery, later supposedly the richest in England.

Two famous people are associated with the abbey. The first is Queen Joan, the wife of Alexander II of Scotland and daughter of King John of England, who is buried in the graveyard (supposedly in a golden coffin). The second is Bishop Richard Poore, builder of Salisbury Cathedral, who was baptised in the abbey church and later (in 1237) buried in it, as its second founder.

The church of St Mary the Virgin, the parish church of Tarrant Crawford, is all that remains of Tarrant Abbey. It was the lay church of the abbey and was built in the 12th century. It has now been designated as a Grade I listed building and is now in the care of the Churches Conservation Trust. The site of the abbey is a Scheduled monument containing mostly buried remains.

=== Known Abbesses of Tarrant Abbey ===
- Claricia, elected about 1228
- Emelina
- Maud, occurs 1240
- Isolda, occurs 1280
- Elena, elected 1298
- Anne, occurs 1351
- Clemence de Cernyngton, occurs 1377
- Joan, occurs 1402
- Avice, occurs 1404
- Edith Coker, died in 1535
- Margaret Lynde (uncertain)
- Margaret Russell, elected 1535, surrendered to Henry VIII in March 1539.
