= Melcombe Horsey =

Civil parish in Dorset, England

Coordinates: 50.8207°N 2.3561°W

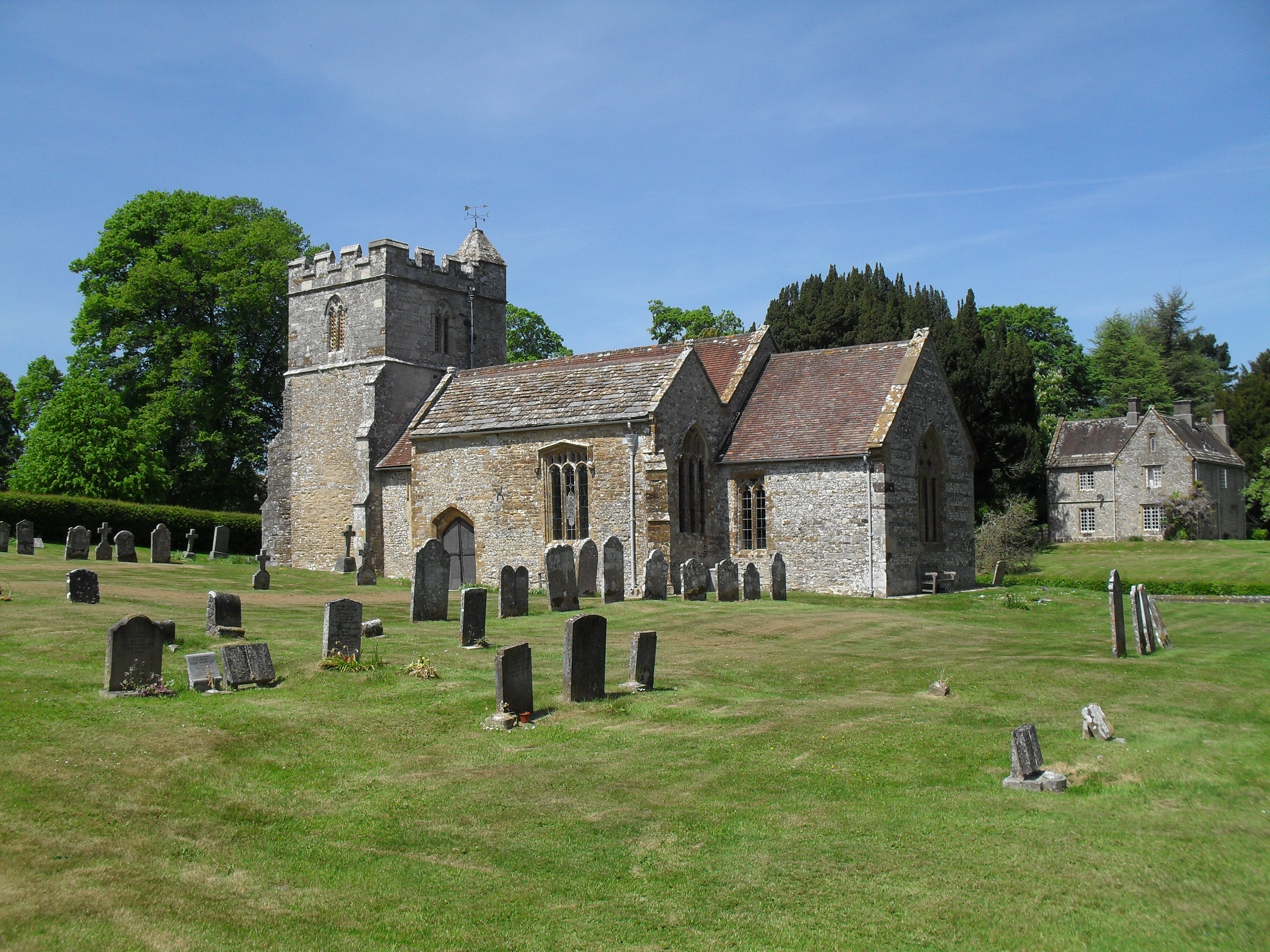
- St Andrew's church, Bingham's Melcombe

- Location within Dorset
- Population: 141
- OS grid reference: ST749028
  - London: 139 miles (224 km)
- Unitary authority: Dorset
- Ceremonial county: Dorset
- Region: South West
- Country: England
- Sovereign state: United Kingdom
- Post town: DORCHESTER
- Dialling code: 01258
- Police: Dorset
- Fire: Dorset and Wiltshire
- Ambulance: South Western
- UK Parliament: West Dorset

Melcombe Horsey is a civil parish in the county of Dorset in South West England. It contains the small settlements of Melcombe Bingham, Bingham's Melcombe and Higher Melcombe, the last being the site of the deserted village of Melcombe Horsey. In the 2011 census the parish had a population of 141.

Bingham's Melcombe is a medieval house. It takes its name from Robert Bingham who acquired the property through marriage in the 13th century. It remained in the Bingham family until 1895. The house is believed to date from the early 16th century. It was substantially restored and remodelled in 1893-4 by Evelyn Hellicar (1862-1929)

== Melcombe Bingham ==
Melcombe Bingham
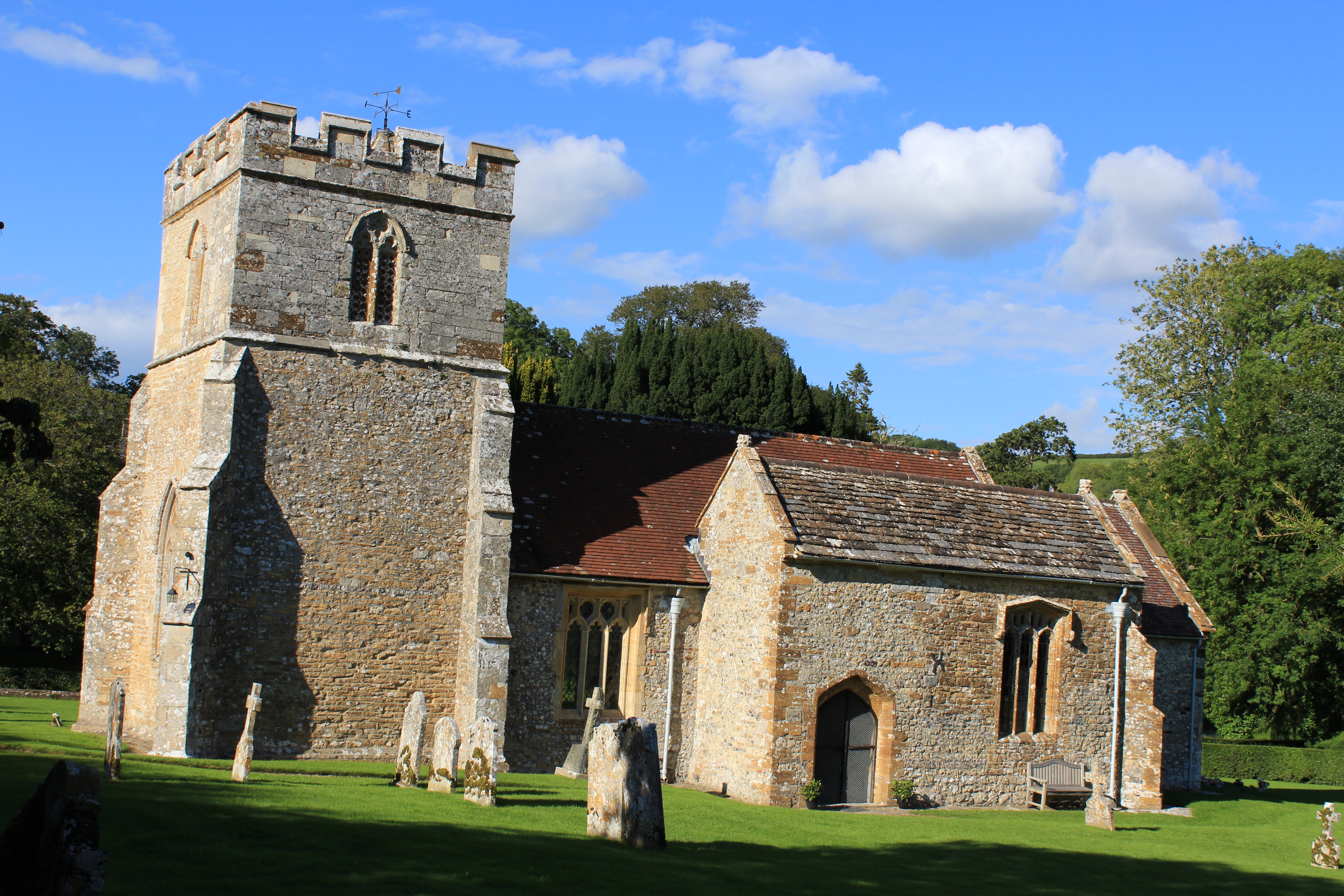
- Melcombe Horsey parish church
- Unitary authority: Dorset
- Shire county: Dorset
- Region: South West
- Country: England
- Sovereign state: United Kingdom
- Post town: DORCHESTER
- Postcode district: DT2
- Dialling code: 01258
- Police: Dorset
- Fire: Dorset and Wiltshire
- Ambulance: South Western

Melcombe Bingham is a village in central Dorset, England, situated approximately 10 miles (16 km) northeast of Dorchester, 12 miles (19 km) southeast of Sherborne and 8 miles (13 km) west-southwest of Blandford Forum. It is surrounded by chalk hills of the Dorset Downs, though the village itself is sited in a basin of greensand and gault.

The names of places in this area are frequently muddled, with published sources providing different information. Melcombe Bingham is the name of the current village, though in the fields near the church there is an abandoned medieval village called Bingham's Melcombe, and this latter name is sometimes used to describe the church and its adjacent manor. Writing in 1980, writer Roland Gant stated "whichever form I use, I always find that the person to whom I am speaking uses the other". Either way, the name of both the civil and ecclesiastical parishes is Melcombe Horsey. There are two manor houses within the parish: the one by the church—owned for six hundred years (until the late 19th century) by the Bingham family—and another a couple of miles to the west in a coombe at Higher Melcombe (which is also called Melcombe Horsey by some sources). Between the two manors is another settlement, situated along the road running north into the neighbouring parish of Hilton. This settlement is called either Hartfoot Lane or Ansty (including Lower Ansty, Ansty Cross, Higher Ansty, and Little Ansty), and, according to the Ordnance Survey, at its southern end it merges into part of Melcombe Bingham.

Melcombe Horsey parish has an area of 2,151 acres. Its population in 1871 was 190 and in 1911 only 151. The parish church, St. Andrew's, is located at the southeastern edge of the parish and its records date to 1690.

== See also ==
Baron Bingham, of Melcombe Bingham
