= Tarrant Monkton =

Village in Dorest, England

Coordinates: 50.8793°N 2.0806°W

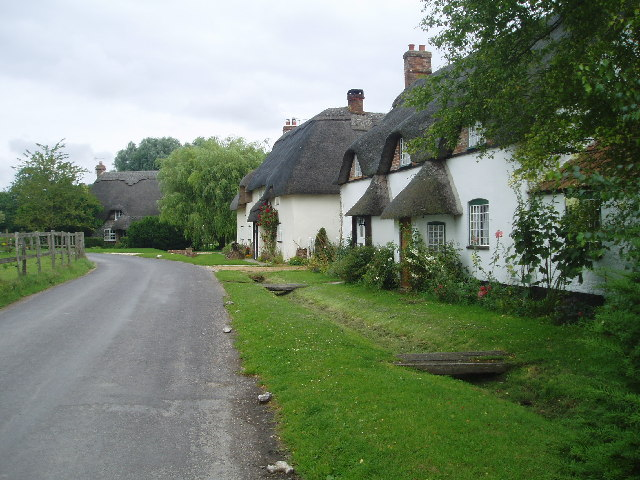
- Tarrant Monkton

- Location within Dorset
- Population: 1,986
- OS grid reference: ST945088
- Unitary authority: Dorset
- Ceremonial county: Dorset
- Region: South West
- Country: England
- Sovereign state: United Kingdom
- Post town: Blandford Forum
- Postcode district: DT11
- Police: Dorset
- Fire: Dorset and Wiltshire
- Ambulance: South Western
- UK Parliament: North Dorset
- Website: Village website

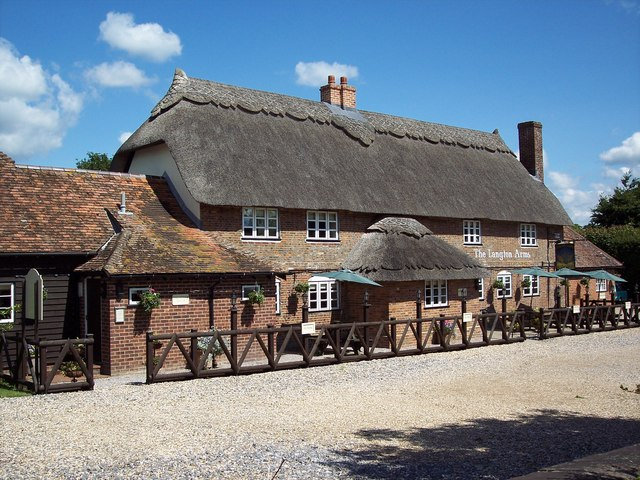
The Langton Arms

Tarrant Monkton is a village and civil parish in north Dorset, England, situated in the Tarrant Valley about four miles (six kilometres) east-northeast of Blandford Forum. Within the parish boundary, 1 1/2 miles (2.5 kilometres) over hills to the west, lies the major part of Blandford Camp army base (including the Royal Signals Museum). In the 2011 census the parish—including the army base—had a population of 1,986. The village is centred on the All Saints Parish Church, opposite which is the Langton Arms, a public house and restaurant.

== History ==
Evidence of prehistoric human activity within the parish includes three round barrows, traces of a possible Iron Age or Romano-British settlement, a 180-metre-long (200-yard) dyke on the SW edge of the army camp and a linear dyke on Luton Down. The barrows previously numbered thirteen; ten others were destroyed after the construction of the army camp in 1914. The Roman road between Badbury Rings and Bath also passed through the parish.

In 1086 in the Domesday Book Tarrant Monkton was recorded as Tarente, and by 1280 it was Tarent Moneketon, the latter part of the name – derived from the Old English manne and tan – referring to ownership by the monks of Tewkesbury Abbey. The Domesday entry states that Tarente had 28 households, 8 ploughlands, 35 acres (14 hectares) of meadow and one mill. It was in Pimperne Hundred and the lord and tenant-in-chief was Cranborne Abbey.

In the village the River Tarrant is crossed by a packhorse bridge that probably dates from the 17th century. The bridge was part of an old route between Blandford Forum and Moor Crichel.

The Tarrant Valley was agriculturally prosperous in the early 19th century due to high wheat prices and low labour costs. Wealthy farming squires built large farmhouses that survive to this day, though their workers often lived in mud-walled cottages that, according to Dorset-born broadcaster and agriculturist Ralph Wightman, "were no more improvable than old pigsties", and these generally have not survived.

Until the end of the 19th century the neighbouring parish of Tarrant Launceston was part of Tarrant Monkton parish. All Saints parish church is built of flint and ashlar and has a chancel dating from around 1400, and a 15th-century nave and west tower, though the building was substantially altered in the 18th century and in 1873.

== Governance ==
Tarrant Monkton parish—including the army base—is in The Lower Tarrants electoral ward, which also extends south to Tarrant Keyneston. The ward had a population of 3,302 in the 2011 census and is part of the constituency of North Dorset, which is currently represented in the UK parliament by the Conservative Simon Hoare.

== Geography ==
Measured directly, Tarrant Monkton village is about 4 mi (6 km) ENE of Blandford Forum, 10 mi (16 km) SE of Shaftesbury and 12 mi (19 km) NNW of Poole. The parish, which covers just over 2,000 acres (800 ha), is based on chalk, at an elevation of about 45 to 115 m (148 to 377 ft). All of the parish is within the Cranborne Chase and West Wiltshire Downs Area of Outstanding Natural Beauty (AONB).

== Demography ==
In the 2011 census Tarrant Monkton civil parish had 417 dwellings, 400 households and a population of 1,986. 1.8% of residents were age 65 or over (compared to 16.4% for England as a whole).

== Amenities ==
Tarrant Monkton has a public house called The Langton Arms and a village hall, which hosts events organised by the Village Hall Committee and is also available for hire.
