= Aiulf the Chamberlain =

English landowner

- Occupation: Landowner

Aiulf the Chamberlain (fl. 1086) was a major landowner in 11th century southern England. He was Sheriff of Dorset in 1086.

== Biography ==
Aiulf's early life is uncertain but he was the brother of Humphrey the Chamberlain. Aiulf served as Sheriff of Dorset. According to the Domesday Book, he was lord of the multiple manors in Dorset, Hampshire and Wiltshire including; Bemerton, Blandford St Mary, Cerne, Durweston, Lulworth, Farnham, Hampreston, Long Crichel, Morden, Southampton, Stinsford, Tollard Royal, Winfrith Newburgh and Wootton Fitzpaine. Aiulf was superseded in Dorset and Somerset.
