= West Chelborough =

Village and civil parish in Dorset, England

Coordinates: 50.846509°N 2.6525813°W

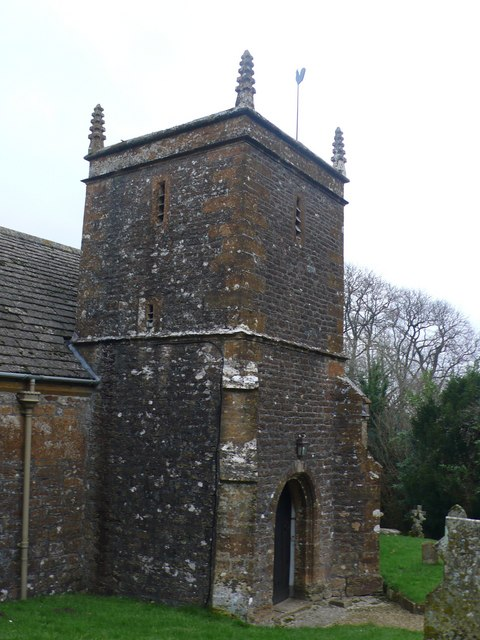

- Location within Dorset
- Area: 2.38 km^{2} (0.92 sq mi)
- Population: 42 (2001 census)
  - Density: 18/km^{2} (47/sq mi)
- Civil parish: West Chelborough
- Unitary authority: Dorset
- Ceremonial county: Dorset
- Region: South West
- Country: England
- Sovereign state: United Kingdom
- Police: Dorset
- Fire: Dorset and Wiltshire
- Ambulance: South Western

West Chelborough is a village and civil parish 13 miles (21 km) northwest of Dorchester, in the Dorset district, in the county of Dorset, England. In 2001, the parish had a population of 42. The parish touches Corscombe and East Chelborough.

== Name ==
"Chelborough" may mean "Ceola's Hill" or "Throat Hill." The Domesday Book records the place as Celberge/Celberga.

== Church ==
The church of St Andrew was rebuilt in about 1640 and restored in 1894. It consists of a chancel, nave, and a tower on the south side. The embattled tower has a pinnacle at each corner and contains two bells. The font is Norman. In 1915, the church had fifty sittings.

The restoration of 1894 was paid for by George Troyte Chafyn Grove of North Coker House, East Coker, who was the lord of the manor and patron of the living. He raised the height of the chancel and re-roofed the entire church. He also renewed the side windows of the chancel, replaced the west windows, and filled the east windows with stained glass. Formerly known as George Bullock, he first added "Troyte" to his name and then, in 1892, "Chafyn-Grove."

In the nineteenth and early twentieth century, the living included 29 acres of glebe. By 1939, this had reduced to 16 acres. When the Rev. H. H. Pace vacated the living, he held an auction of farm implements, dairy utensils, six ricks of hay, and other items.

The recorded acreage of the parish has varied slightly over the years, from 563 in 1851 to 578 in 1939.

In 1888, West Chelborough's rectory and East Chelborough's rectory were united into one benefice.

== Population ==
The population as recorded by the decennial census was as follows:

	Males	Females	Total
1801	23	22	45
1811	23	21	44
1821	31	25	56
1831	35	27	62
1841	29	29	58
1851	30	34	64
1861	33	40	73
1871	32	40	72
1881	32	30	62
1891	30	27	57
1901	30	32	62
1911	21	37	58
1921	25	27	52
1931	23	23	46
1941	No census taken		
1951	17	14	31
1961	15	14	29
1971	20	23	43

== Geology ==
The subsoil is chalk and greensand.

== Tithe map ==
The tithe map, dated 1839, is at the scale of one inch to six chains.

== School ==
George Bullock built a "small cottage National school" in the village soon after he became lord of the manor in 1860. Mrs. Charlotte Whitty served as the schoolmistress for more than twenty years, after which it closed, and the children transferred to Corscombe.

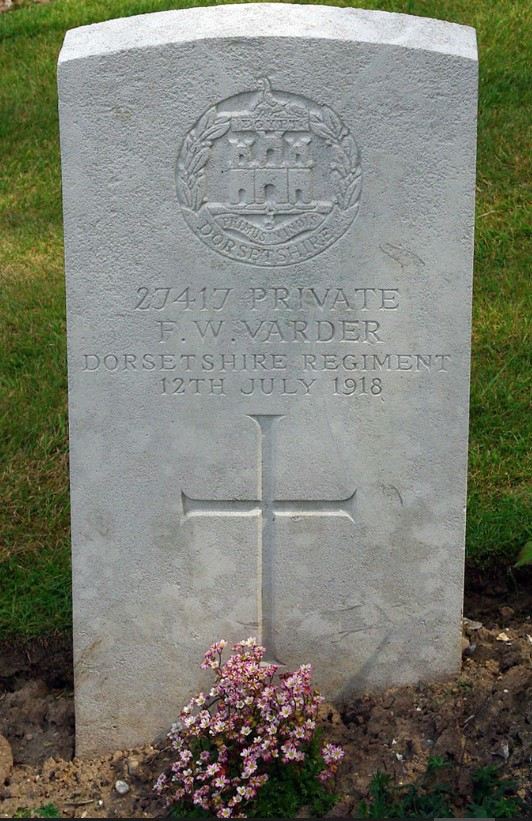
The grave of Private Frederick William Varder at .Etretat in Normandy. He is also commemorated on his son's gravestone at Halstock.

== First World War ==
In August 1916, Private Joseph Hawkins was awarded the Military Medal for distinguished conduct on the battlefield in France and promoted to full corporal. He was the fiancé of Alma Mary Dowton of Corscombe and the father of her daughter, who was about to be born. The couple married at West Chelborough on 11 July 1917 and, after the war, lived in the village at Ewens Farm.

At a tribunal in September 1916, 27-year-old Frederick William Varder of West Chelborough applied for exemption from military service because he managed his stepfather's holding at Ewens Farm. The tribunal ruled that the three-month exemption previously granted should end on 31 October. On 12 July 1918, he died of influenza while serving with the 6th battalion of the Dorset regiment in France, leaving a widow and three young children.

== Listed buildings ==
There are 6 listed buildings in West Chelborough.
