= All Saints' Church, Tarrant Keyneston =

Church in Dorset, England

All Saints' Church
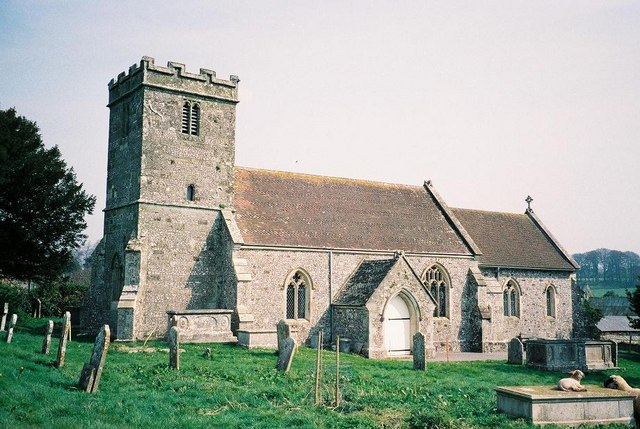

Religion
- Affiliation: Church of England
- Ecclesiastical or organisational status: Active
- Year consecrated: 1853

Location
- Location: Tarrant Keyneston, Dorset, England
- Interactive map of All Saints' Church
- Coordinates: 50.8360°N 2.1076°W

Architecture
- Architect: Thomas Henry Wyatt
- Type: Church
- Style: Perpendicular

All Saints' Church is a Church of England parish church in Tarrant Keyneston, Dorset, England. Most of the church dates to a rebuild of 1852–53, but the tower is 15th-century. The church is a Grade II* listed building.

== History ==
A church at Tarrant Keyneston is known to have existed in the early 14th century, with the earliest known rector being recorded in 1317. By the middle of the 19th century, the church was in a dilapidated state and was no longer able to comfortably accommodate the congregation. A decision was made to rebuild the church except for the tower, with plans being drawn up by the Diocesan architect Thomas Henry Wyatt of London. A north aisle was added to the new church to provide additional accommodation. At the time, the population of the parish numbered approximately 320 people and the new church was designed to accommodate 280.

Much of the £1,500 cost was covered by the lord of the manor, Sir John J. Smith of Down House. Rev. Henry Austen, whose father Rev. John Austen was rector of the parish at the time, contributed £300. The Salisbury Diocesan Church Building Society granted £100 towards the work in September 1852, and the Incorporated Church Building Society granted £70 on the condition that 209 seats would be free and unappropriated for use of the poorer inhabitants.

The faculty authorising the demolition and rebuilding of the church was obtained in 1852. The entire church was rebuilt except for the tower which was retained and repaired. The construction was carried out under Wyatt's supervision. The completed church was consecrated by the Bishop of Salisbury, the Right Rev. Edward Denison, on 23 September 1853.

In c. 1912, the churchyard was extended, and repairs were carried out to the church tower. In c. 1914, the church received three new bells in memory of the rector Rev. Philip Wingate. In c. 1970, the pulpit was re-constructed and a new roof was added to the tower.

== Architecture ==
All Saints is built of Melbury stone rubble and flint, with dressings in Bath stone and the roofs covered with tiles from Donhead. It is made up of a nave, chancel, north aisle, north vestry, south porch and west tower. The entire church dates to 1852–53 with the exception of the 15th-century two-stage tower. The tower has an embattled parapet with a moulded coping, and the lower stage has buttresses on the north-west and south-west corners. It contains four bells, one of 15th-century origin and the other three being 20th-century.

As part of the 1852–53 work, a new pulpit, font and reading desk were fitted, as well as an organ of 1853, built by Gray and Davison of London. The pulpit is octagonal and made of timber, and the octagonal font is of stone. The communion table is 17th-century with a 19th-century top. The wrought-iron communion rails date to 1906.

The chancel's east end window originally had stained glass made by William Miller of London and presented to the church by Rev M. Smith Marriott. The windows on the south side also had stained glass by James Powell and Sons. These windows were replaced with plain glass in 1942 as the lead work had fallen into a poor state of repair and was deemed too costly to repair.

== Churchyard ==
In the churchyard are a number of table tombs that have been Grade II listed monuments since 1986:

- Members of the Bastard and Barfoot families including the architects Thomas Bastard (1731) and John Bastard (1778), with vaulted tomb below
- Members of the Clapcott family, 1789
- F. Benjafield, 1791
- Members of the Clapcott and Williams families, 1805
- James Mayo and others, 1822
- Joseph Scormy and Isaac Randall, 1844
- Susan Adelaide and Frances Sarah Baverstock, 1849
- Elizabeth and Rev. Henry Austen, 1865
