= Fifehead Neville =

Village and civil parish in Dorset, England

Coordinates: 50.8976°N 2.3307°W

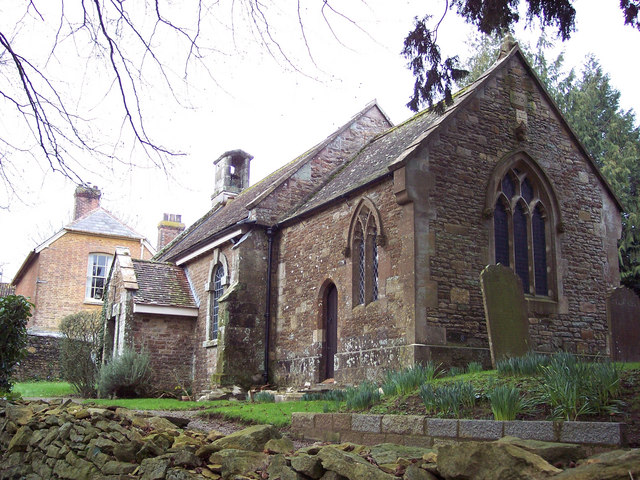
- All Saints Church

- Location within Dorset
- Population: 147
- OS grid reference: ST766109
- Unitary authority: Dorset
- Ceremonial county: Dorset
- Region: South West
- Country: England
- Sovereign state: United Kingdom
- Post town: Sturminster Newton
- Postcode district: DT10
- Police: Dorset
- Fire: Dorset and Wiltshire
- Ambulance: South Western
- UK Parliament: North Dorset

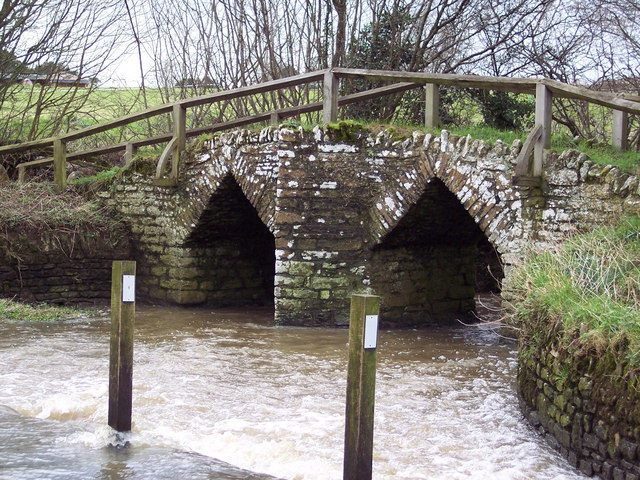
Packhorse bridge over the River Divelish

Fifehead Neville is a village and civil parish in the county of Dorset in southern England, situated in the Blackmore Vale about two miles (three kilometres) southwest of the town of Sturminster Newton. In the 2011 census the population of the parish was 147.

== Toponymy ==
The first part of the name Fifehead Neville derives from the Old English fīf and hīd, meaning '(estate of) five hides of land'. It was recorded as Fifhide in the Domesday Book of 1086. The second part derives from the de Neville family who were here in the 13th century; in 1287 the name Fyfhud Neuyle was recorded. This differentiated this Fifehead from other Dorset manorial holdings called Fifehead (Fifehead St Quintin and Fifehead St Magdalen).

== History ==
In a field bordering the River Divelish the remains of two wings of a Roman villa were found in 1880 and 1903. Floor mosaics and part of a hypocaust system were uncovered. The archaeological findings are on view in the Dorset Museum in Dorchester.

The Domesday Book records that in 1086 the estate of Fifehead Neville had eight households and was part of Pimperne Hundred. The tenant-in-chief of the estate was Waleran the Hunter whose tenant was Ingelrann. The overlordship descended to Walter Walerand (d. 1200–1) and to his daughter and co-heiress Isabel de Waleran who married William de Nevill. The overlordship was inherited by Isabel de Nevill's daughter Joan de Nevill (d. 1263), wife of Jordan de St. Martin.

Crossing the Divelish is an old packhorse bridge that has two pointed arches and is probably medieval.

Before 1920 the parish was in two parts, each with its own settlement—Fifehead Neville in the north and Lower Fifehead or Fifehead St Quentin in the south. It is probable each settlement had previously had its own open field system. Fifehead St Quentin (or Fifehead St Quintin) was previously a detached part of Belchalwell, a former parish that is now part of the parish of Okeford Fitzpaine.

== Geography ==
Fifehead Neville parish is in the North Dorset administrative district in the Blackmore Vale, sited next to the River Divelish which drains land north of the Dorset Downs around Bulbarrow Hill. The parish, which covers 1,350 acres (550 hectares) at an elevation of 60 to 90 metres (200 to 300 feet), is also drained by a small tributary of the River Lydden in the west. The underlying geology is mostly Corallian Limestone, with a small amount of Kimmeridge clay in the east and some Oxford clay at Deadmoor Common in the west. Measured directly, Fifehead Neville village is about 2 mi (3 km) SW of Sturminster Newton, 8 mi (13 km) NNW of Blandford Forum and 14 mi (23 km) NNE of the county town, Dorchester.

== Demography ==
In the 2011 census Fifehead Neville civil parish had 61 dwellings, 56 households and a population of 147.

The population of the parish in the censuses between 1921 and 2001 is shown in the table below:

Census Population of Fifehead Neville Parish 1921—2001 (except 1941)
Census	1921	1931	1951	1961	1971	1981	1991	2001
Population	133	145	153	149	140	160	120	140
Source:Dorset County Council

In 2013 the estimated population of the parish was 180.
