= Durweston =

Village and civil parish in Dorset, England

Coordinates: 50.8755°N 2.2022°W

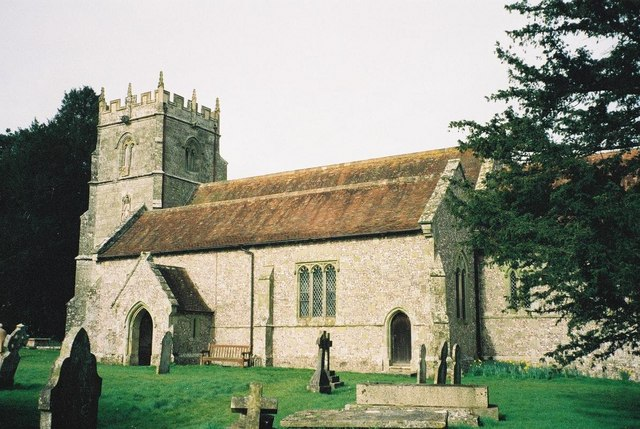
- Parish church of St Nicholas

- Location within Dorset
- Population: 398
- OS grid reference: ST858085
- Unitary authority: Dorset
- Ceremonial county: Dorset
- Region: South West
- Country: England
- Sovereign state: United Kingdom
- Post town: Blandford Forum
- Postcode district: DT11
- Police: Dorset
- Fire: Dorset and Wiltshire
- Ambulance: South Western
- UK Parliament: North Dorset

Durweston (/dərˈwɛstən/ dər-WES-tən) is a village and civil parish in the English county of Dorset. It lies two miles (three kilometres) northwest of the town of Blandford Forum. It is sited by the River Stour at the point where it flows out of the Blackmore Vale through a steep, narrow gap between the Dorset Downs and Cranborne Chase. In the 2011 census the parish had a population of 398.

== History ==
In 1086 Durweston appeared in two entries in the Domesday Book, being recorded as Derwinestone and Dervinestone. It was in Pimperne Hundred, had fifteen households, 2 acres (0.8 hectares) of vineyards and a total taxable value of 6.5 geld units. The tenants-in-chief were Aiulf the Chamberlain and Hawise, wife of Hugh son of Grip. Dyrwyneston may be another variation.

Durweston parish was previously two parishes: Durweston and Knighton. The present-day parish church is on the site of the church that belonged to Knighton parish; the original Durweston church occupied a site near Durweston Mill, though little trace remains today. The two parishes were combined in 1381 for reasons not known. The current church was mostly rebuilt in 1846, though the tower dates from the 15th century.

A new village hall was opened in Durweston in April 2003. It is a venue for entertainment events and social gatherings, and is also a business conference centre for the wider community of North Dorset.

== Geography ==
Durweston village is sited on the southwest bank of the River Stour at an altitude of 40 to 50 metres (130 to 160 feet). Measured directly, it is two miles (three kilometres) northwest of Blandford Forum, 5 1/2 miles (9 kilometres) southeast of Sturminster Newton and 9 mi (14 km) south of Shaftesbury. The A357 main road between Blandford and Sturminster passes through the village. Durweston parish covers 1,800 acres (730 hectares) and extends west from the river over chalk hills, reaching an altitude of about 190 m (620 ft).

== Culture ==
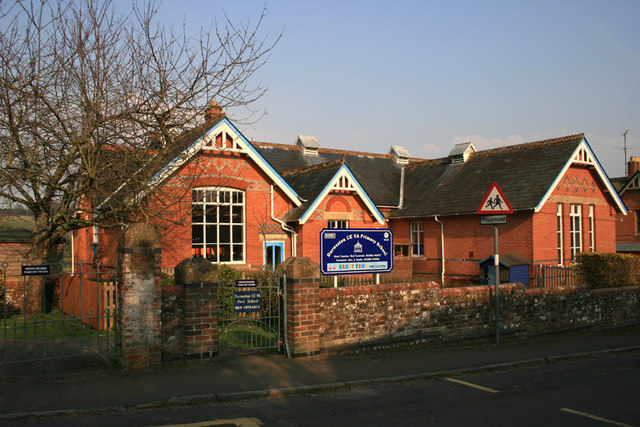
Durweston Primary School

Durweston is one of the last places in the area, if not the last, to maintain a tradition known as "shroving", a regional juvenile begging custom of obscure origin. Every Shrove Tuesday children from Durweston Primary School process around the village during the morning, calling on local people, singing songs and giving flowers. Those who are visited may also give the children bread or other tidbits to eat. One suggestion for the tradition's origin is that it is a survival of a medieval dole, though it was unrecorded in the region before the end of the 18th century. By the 1950s it continued in only a few places, and only survives at Durweston due to a bequest in 1925.

The shroving chant which was repeated at each door in the expectation of a gift of confectionery:

"We be come a shroving

For a piece of truckle-cheese

Or a piece of bacon

Of your own making

So light the fire and het the pan

For we be come a shroving"

For many generations the people who live in Durweston have sung a collection of carols unique to their village, now known as the Durweston Carols. These were probably composed between 1750 and 1850, and form part of a forgotten repertory from English parish churches. These came to be known as 'gallery carols' because they were often performed by groups of voices and instruments in the west gallery of country parish churches and, until 1877, there was a gallery in Durweston Church. During the Christmas period of 2009, residents of the village and the surrounding area gathered to record and document the Durweston Carols.

== Media ==
Durweston has its own monthly village magazine "Durweston News", as well as a bi-monthly Christian "Benefice Magazine" shared with the neighbouring parishes of Stourpaine, Pimperne and Bryanston.

== Miscellaneous ==
A coastal minesweeper called HMS Durweston was launched at the Dorset Yacht Company's Hamworthy yard on 18 August 1955.
