= River Tarrant =

River in Dorset, England

Tarrant
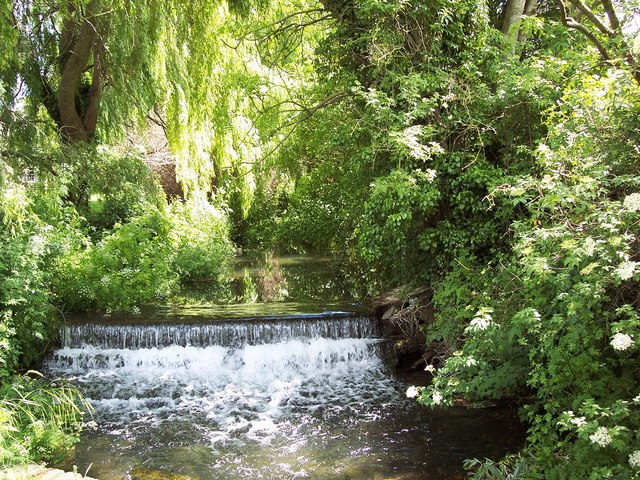
- The River Tarrant near Tarrant Crawford

- Location within Dorset

Location
- Country: United Kingdom
- County: Dorset

Physical characteristics
- Source
  - location: Tarrant Gunville, Dorset
  - coordinates: 50°55′N 2°07′W
- Mouth
  - location: Tarrant Crawford, Dorset
  - coordinates: 50.82894°N 2.12062°W

The River Tarrant is a chalk stream and a 7 1/2-mile-long (12 km) tributary of the River Stour in Dorset. The valley lies to the east of Blandford Forum. The river rises near Cranborne Chase, an area of chalk downland, and flows broadly from north to south before joining the river Stour. The eight Tarrant Valley villages/hamlets all bear the name of the river. Listed in order from the river's source, they are:

- Tarrant Gunville: the source of the river is in the grounds of Gunville House, now demolished. The parish church is dedicated to St Mary.
- Tarrant Hinton: a village at a crossroads. The parish church is dedicated to St Mary.
- Tarrant Launceston: a hamlet with a 17th-century three-arched bridge. The church, dedicated to St Mary, was demolished in the 1700s (the site is on Higher Dairy Farm). Now part of the parish of Tarrant Monkton.
- Tarrant Monkton: a village with a parish church dedicated to All Saints.
- Tarrant Rawston: a very small settlement. This once had a parish church dedicated to St Mary, which still exists and is in private ownership, but remains as a church.
- Tarrant Rushton: a village with a parish church dedicated to St Mary. Near here was a World War II RAF airfield.
- Tarrant Keyneston: this is the largest village of the eight; it has a parish church dedicated to All Saints.
- Tarrant Crawford, the final settlement, lies at the confluence of the rivers Tarrant and Stour. Here, there is the church of St Mary the Virgin held by the Churches Conservation Trust and Tarrant Abbey farm, where once stood a nunnery. Tarrant Crawford became part of the parish of Tarrant Keyneston.

There were possibly one or two other Tarrant communities:

- Tarrant Stubhampton, north of Tarrant Gunville and part of that parish: This is now known as Stubhampton, part of the parish of Tarrant Gunville. In the Middle Ages, a church existed in that village. This is the source of the Tarrant.
- Tarrant Antioch, which may have been an earlier name for Tarrant Rawston, or may have been a distinct community just north of Tarrant Rawston. Tarrant Antioch was served by St Mary Tarrant Crawford, where there was a devotion to St Margaret of Antioch.
- Tarrant Preston, now Preston Farm

A Roman road followed the valley, and there are many tumuli on the hills on both sides of the river, evidence of long occupation.
