= Stourpaine =

Village and civil parish in Dorset, England

Coordinates: 50.8847°N 2.198°W

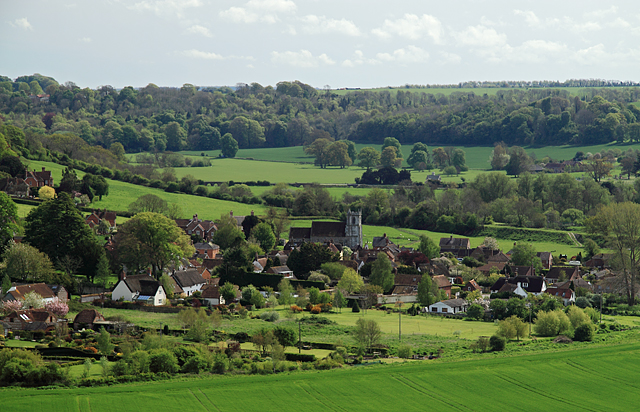
- Stourpaine viewed from Hod Hill

- Location within Dorset
- Population: 617
- OS grid reference: ST861093
- Civil parish: Stourpaine
- Unitary authority: Dorset
- Ceremonial county: Dorset
- Region: South West
- Country: England
- Sovereign state: United Kingdom
- Post town: BLANDFORD FORUM
- Postcode district: DT11
- Dialling code: 01258
- Police: Dorset
- Fire: Dorset and Wiltshire
- Ambulance: South Western
- UK Parliament: North Dorset

Stourpaine (/staʊərˈpeɪn/) is a village and civil parish in the ceremonial county of Dorset in southern England. It is situated in the valley of the River Stour in the Dorset administrative district, three miles (five kilometres) northwest of Blandford Forum. The A350 road, which connects Blandford to Shaftesbury to the north, passes through the village. The chalk hills of Cranborne Chase and the Dorset Downs lie immediately northeast and southwest respectively. In the 2011 census the civil parish had 277 dwellings, 265 households and a population of 617.

It was the original site of the Great Dorset Steam Fair, which has been held at nearby Tarrant Hinton in more recent years.

The joint benefice of Pimperne, Stourpaine, Durweston and Bryanston is in the Church of England Diocese of Salisbury.

== History ==
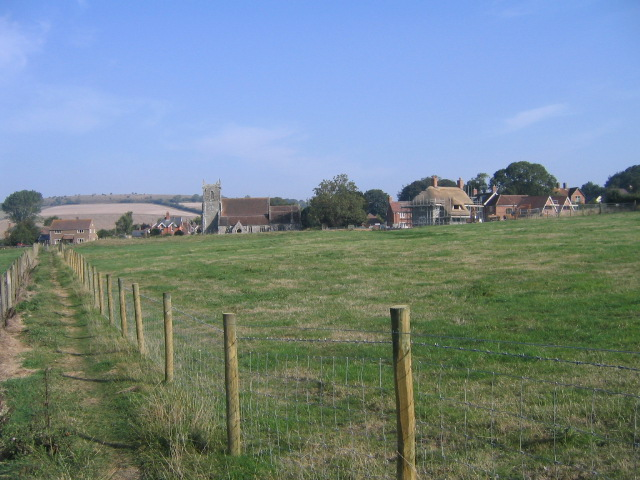
The view northwards to Stourpaine, with Holy Trinity parish church in the distance

A gift of land to the church is recorded in the Domesday Book of 1086. The church of the Holy Trinity is medieval; in the 15th century the tower and nave were rebuilt in the Perpendicular style so that the nave was enlarged. Box pews were installed in the 18th century but by the 19th century the church was so dilapidated that rebuilding was undertaken (apart from the tower); the architect for the rebuilding was T. H. Wyatt.

The funeral service of Major Bruce Shand, the father of Queen Camilla, was held at the Holy Trinity Church in Stourpaine on 16 June 2006, after which Major Shand's body was cremated. The funeral of his son Mark was also at Stourpaine, in 2014.
