= Ansty, Dorset =

Village in Dorset, England

Coordinates: 50.8317°N 2.3290°W

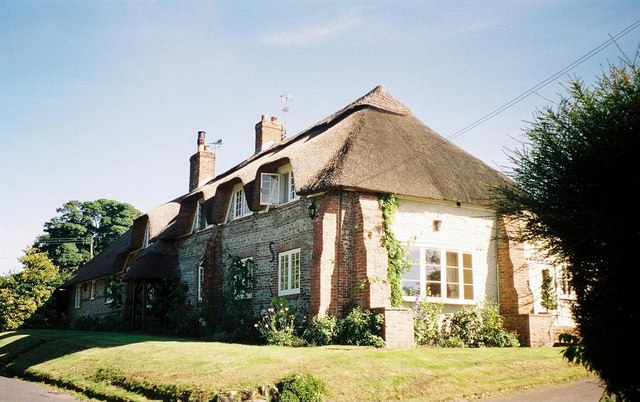
- Thatched cottage in Higher Ansty

- Location within Dorset
- Civil parish: Hilton
- Unitary authority: Dorset
- Ceremonial county: Dorset
- Region: South West
- Country: England
- Sovereign state: United Kingdom
- Postcode district: DT
- Police: Dorset
- Fire: Dorset and Wiltshire
- Ambulance: South Western

Ansty is a village in the civil parish of Hilton, in Dorset, England, north of Cheselbourne and west of Milton Abbas. It consists of the settlements of Higher Ansty, Lower Ansty, Pleck (also known as Little Ansty) and Ansty Cross. The Hall & Woodhouse brewing company founded a brewery in the village in 1777, and brewing continued here until the 1940s. The village hall used to be a brewery building, and the old malthouse became Malthouse Cottages. From 1974 to 2019 it was in North Dorset district.
