= Cheselbourne =

Village and civil parish in Dorset, England

Coordinates: 50.7966°N 2.338°W

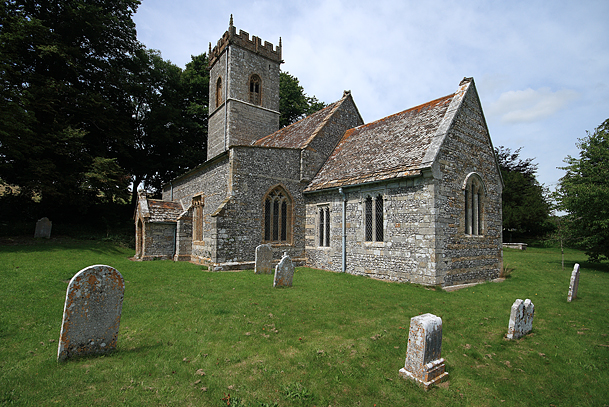
- Parish Church of St Martin

- Location within Dorset
- Population: 296
- OS grid reference: SY763997
- Unitary authority: Dorset
- Ceremonial county: Dorset
- Region: South West
- Country: England
- Sovereign state: United Kingdom
- Post town: Dorchester
- Postcode district: DT2
- Police: Dorset
- Fire: Dorset and Wiltshire
- Ambulance: South Western
- UK Parliament: West Dorset

Cheselbourne (sometimes spelled Chesilborne or Cheselborne) is a village and civil parish in Dorset, England, situated in the Dorset Downs, 7 miles (11 km) north-east of Dorchester. The parish is at an altitude of 75 to 245 metres (approximately 250 to 800 feet) and covers an area of 1,175 hectares (2,900 acres); the underlying geology is chalk. In the 2011 census the parish had a population of 296.

The village, which contains a mix of buildings of different ages and styles, is spread along four lanes which meet here. It has a public house called the Rivers Arms. The 13th- to 14th-century parish church has a pinnacled tower with battlements, numerous gargoyles and a canonical sundial.

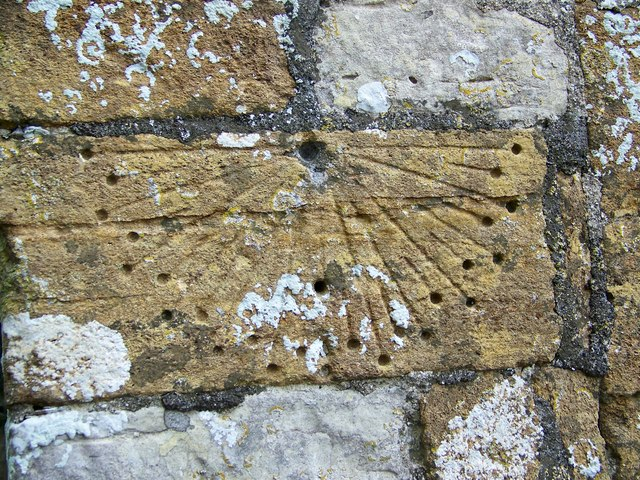
Canonical sundial on the parish church

In 1086, in the Domesday Book Cheselbourne was recorded as Ceseburne; it had 36 households, 10 acres (4.0 ha) of meadow and one mill. It was in the hundred of Hilton and the lord and tenant-in-chief was Shaftesbury Abbey.

Cheselbourne used to be the site of a tradition known as "Treading in the Wheat", in which young women from the village would walk the fields on Palm Sunday, dressed in white.

At Lyscombe Farm in the northwest of the parish are the remains of an early 13th-century chapel. The nave was once used as a bakehouse and then a farmworker's dwelling. In 1957, a Dutch barn was built over the ruins.
