= Tarrant Rushton =

Village and civil parish in Dorset, England

Coordinates: 50.852°N 2.0899°W

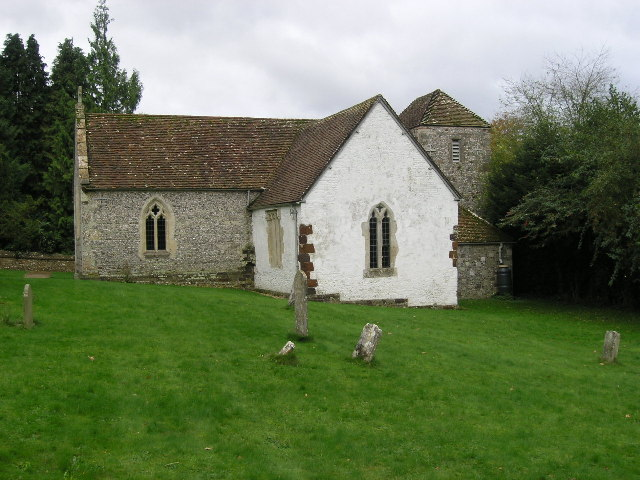
- Parish church of Saint Mary

- Location within Dorset
- Population: 80
- OS grid reference: ST937058
- Unitary authority: Dorset
- Ceremonial county: Dorset
- Region: South West
- Country: England
- Sovereign state: United Kingdom
- Post town: BLANDFORD FORUM
- Postcode district: DT11
- Police: Dorset
- Fire: Dorset and Wiltshire
- Ambulance: South Western
- UK Parliament: North Dorset

Tarrant Rushton is a village and civil parish in north Dorset, England. The village is situated in the Tarrant Valley about three miles (five kilometres) east of Blandford Forum. In 2013 the civil parish had an estimated population of 80. Starting in the north east the parish adjoins Moor Crichel, Witchampton, Pamphill, Shapwick, Tarrant Crawford, Tarrant Keynston and Tarrant Rawston. The ancient church of St Mary is built of flint and stone and parts of it date from Norman times. The church accommodates 120 persons and the registers date from 1700.

At one time there was a hospital or charity in the parish dedicated to St Leonard. There has not been a post office in the parish, but there was a parish school which in 1895 catered for 45 children. Abbey Crofts which in the 1890s had a population of 7 was transferred to Tarrant Crawford. The population in 1891 was 177. The 2,073 acres (839 hectares) are light loam and used to be mainly for cultivation of wheat.

To the east of the village is Tarrant Rushton Airfield. It was built during World War II, during which it played a vital role, and remained in use until 1980.
