= Farnham, Dorset =

Village and civil parish in Dorset, England

Coordinates: 50.9354°N 2.0598°W

Farnham
- The Museum Inn in Farnham village centre

- Location within Dorset
- Population: 183
- OS grid reference: ST958151
- Civil parish: Farnham
- Unitary authority: Dorset
- Ceremonial county: Dorset
- Region: South West
- Country: England
- Sovereign state: United Kingdom
- Post town: BLANDFORD FORUM
- Postcode district: DT11
- Dialling code: 01725
- Police: Dorset
- Fire: Dorset and Wiltshire
- Ambulance: South Western
- UK Parliament: North Dorset

Farnham is a village and civil parish in Dorset, in the south of England, on Cranborne Chase, seven miles (eleven kilometres) northeast of Blandford Forum. In the 2011 census the parish had a population of 183.

== Toponymy ==
The name Farnham derives from the Old English fearn (fern) and ham (homestead) and means an enclosure or homestead where ferns grow. In the Domesday Book of 1086 Farnham was recorded as Ferneham or Fernham.

== History ==
The early settlement history of Farnham isn't clear. Iron Age and Romano-British field systems were created in the surrounding area generally, though traces haven't survived at Farnham. The present-day Farnham village has emerged from five separate settlements associated with clearings in hazel coppice; in the Domesday Book Ferneham or Fernham is recorded five times, though not all the entries refer to the present-day settlement. The book records 12 households with a total taxable value of 6 geld units. The county's sheriff at the time, Aiulf the Chamberlain, owned some of the land.

For much of its history Farnham has been closely connected with Tollard Royal, the adjacent village and parish in the neighbouring county of Wiltshire. Tollard Farnham (or Farnham Tollard), a tithing to the north of Farnham village, was previously owned by the de Tollard family of Tollard Royal, and until 1885, when it was joined with Farnham, its dead were taken along a track named Burials Drove to be buried at Tollard Royal.

The old museum building at Crossways, where Pitt Rivers housed his personal collection. The building is now private residences.

Augustus Pitt Rivers lived nearby on the Rushmore Estate. Following his donation of some 20,000 antiquities to the University of Oxford in 1884, forming the nucleus of the Pitt Rivers Museum, he continued to collect archaeological and ethnological specimens for his personal collection, which was held in the former Orphan Gypsy School at Crossways, about 1/2 mile (800 metres) from Farnham village centre. The village's inn became the Museum Hotel to cater for visitors, which numbered 12,000 per year at the peak of the museum's popularity. The Farnham collection was dispersed in the 1970s, with the British items going to the Salisbury and South Wiltshire Museum, and the ethnographic collections sold.

== Geography ==
Farnham parish is situated at the head of the valley of the small Gussage Brook, on the dip slope of the hills of Cranborne Chase. It covers 1,420 acres (570 ha) at an approximate altitude of 75 to 150 metres (250 to 500 feet) and geologically comprises chalk, overlain by clay-with-flints in places. Measured directly, Farnham village is 7 mi (11 km) northeast of Blandford Forum, 7 1/2 mi (12 km) southeast of Shaftesbury, 10 mi (16 km) north-northwest of Wimborne Minster and 14 1/2 mi (23 km) southwest of Salisbury.

== Demography ==
In the 2011 census Farnham civil parish had 105 dwellings, 92 households and a population of 183.

The population of the parish in the censuses between 1921 and 2001 is shown in the table below:

Census Population of Farnham Parish 1921—2001 (except 1941)
Census	1921	1931	1951	1961	1971	1981	1991	2001
Population	202	183	165	149	150	180	200	220
Source:Dorset County Council
