= North Poorton =

Hamlet in Dorset, England

Coordinates: 50.7809°N 2.6833°W

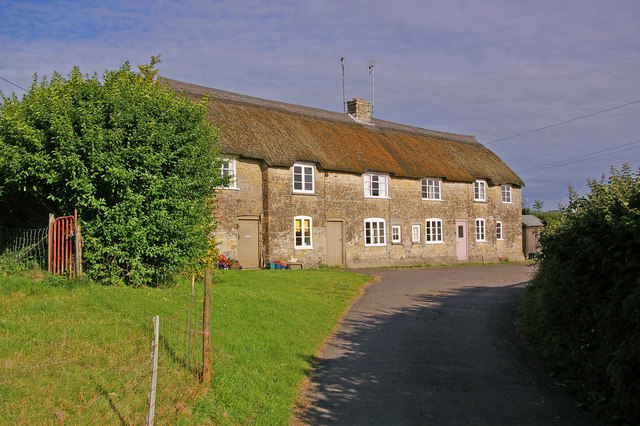
- Manor Farm Cottages, North Poorton

- Location within Dorset
- Population: 20
- OS grid reference: SY517962
- Unitary authority: Dorset
- Ceremonial county: Dorset
- Region: South West
- Country: England
- Sovereign state: United Kingdom
- Post town: Bridport
- Police: Dorset
- Fire: Dorset and Wiltshire
- Ambulance: South Western
- UK Parliament: West Dorset

North Poorton is a hamlet and civil parish in Dorset, England, situated in the Dorset unitary authority area about 4.5 miles (7.2 km) northeast of Bridport. Dorset County Council estimate the parish had a population of 20 in 2013.

The old parish church of St Peter is a ruin, with walls remaining to about 4 feet (1.2 m) high. Just to the south is the new church, which is dedicated to St Mary Magdalene and was built in 1861–62 to a design by John Hicks. About 0.5 miles (0.80 km) NW of the churches is a hill-fort that covers about 2.5 acres (1.0 ha).
