= Tarrant Crawford =

Village and civil parish in Dorset, England

Coordinates: 50.8305°N 2.1117°W

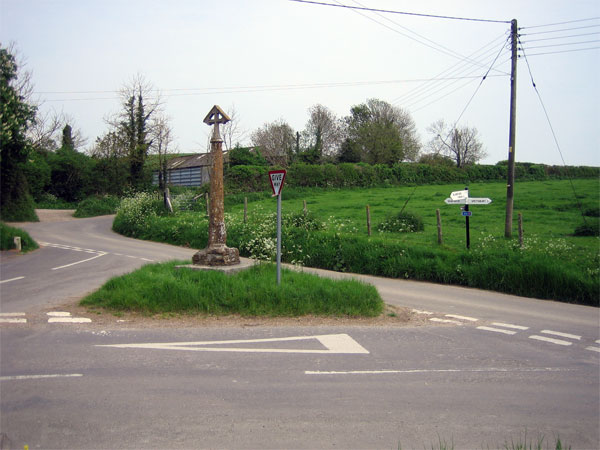
- Wayside Cross, Tarrant Crawford

- Location within Dorset
- Population: 20
- OS grid reference: ST925035
- Unitary authority: Dorset
- Ceremonial county: Dorset
- Region: South West
- Country: England
- Sovereign state: United Kingdom
- Post town: BLANDFORD FORUM
- Postcode district: DT11
- Police: Dorset
- Fire: Dorset and Wiltshire
- Ambulance: South Western
- UK Parliament: North Dorset

Tarrant Crawford is a small village and civil parish at the lower end of the Tarrant Valley in Dorset, England. The River Tarrant joins the larger River Stour here. The village consists of two small settlements: Crawford Farm and a few houses in the Stour Valley, and Tarrant Abbey Farm, a church, and a few houses in the Tarrant Valley about 1/2 mile (800 metres) to the north. Locals regard the two settlements as separate villages. In 2013 the estimated population of the civil parish was 20.

At the Crawford settlement there is a wayside cross which has an inscription which reads:

"THIS WAYSIDE CROSS WAS RESTORED & SET ON NEW STEPS ON THE OLD SITE BY MANY FRIENDS OF TARRANT CRAWFORD ANNO DOM MDCCCCXIV"

The 1881 census says - No. of households/schedules 11, Uninhabited houses 0, Males 31, Females 30, Total 61

== Tarrant Abbey ==
Tarrant Abbey Farm was in medieval times the site of Tarrant Abbey, founded in the 12th century by Ralph de Kahaines (of nearby Tarrant Keyneston) as a Cistercian nunnery, later supposedly the richest in England.

Two famous people are associated with the abbey: Queen Joan, the wife of Alexander II of Scotland and daughter of King John of England (Richard I's brother and successor), is buried in the graveyard (supposedly in a golden coffin), and Bishop Richard Poore, builder of Salisbury Cathedral, who was baptised in the abbey church and later (in 1237) buried in the abbey, which he founded. He was at one time Dean of the old cathedral at Old Sarum, and later became bishop of first Chichester, then Salisbury and finally Durham.

== St Mary's Church ==
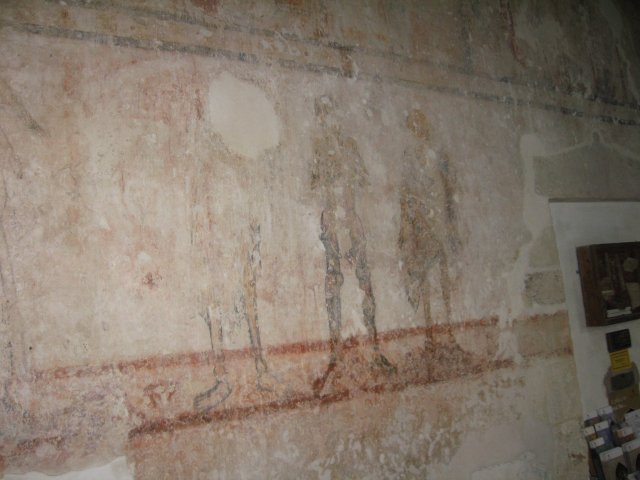
Thirteenth-century murals in the Church of Saint Mary the Virgin

Saint Mary's Church, near Tarrant Abbey Farm, is known for its 13th- and 14th-century wall paintings, many of which are in a remarkable state of preservation.
