= Tarrant Launceston =

Village and civil parish in Dorset, England

Coordinates: 50.8874°N 2.0834°W

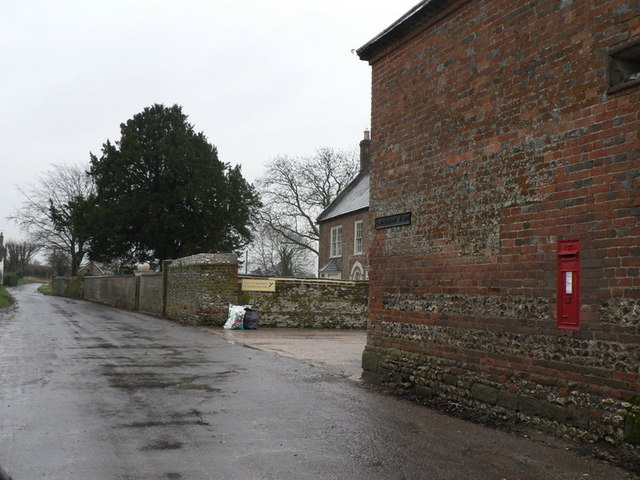
- Tarrant Launceston

- Location within Dorset
- Population: 498
- OS grid reference: ST942096
- Unitary authority: Dorset
- Ceremonial county: Dorset
- Region: South West
- Country: England
- Sovereign state: United Kingdom
- Post town: BLANDFORD FORUM
- Postcode district: DT11
- Police: Dorset
- Fire: Dorset and Wiltshire
- Ambulance: South Western
- UK Parliament: North Dorset

Tarrant Launceston is a small village and civil parish in north Dorset, England, situated in the Tarrant Valley 5 miles (8 kilometres) northeast of Blandford Forum. The parish includes part of Blandford Camp to the west and a few buildings on the northern edge of neighbouring Tarrant Monkton to the south. In the 2011 census the parish had 156 households and a population of 498.

Although the Great Dorset Steam Fair is advertised as being located in Tarrant Hinton, the actual show site itself is in Tarrant Launceston, which is one of the adjacent parishes.

== Governance & religion ==
Tarrant Launceston civil parish falls under the Dorset Council ward of Cranborne Chase, whose present councillor is Conservative Piers Brown, and the parliamentary constituency of North Dorset, whose present MP is Conservative Simon Hoare.

In the Church of England, the ecclesiastical parish of Tarrant Monkton with Tarrant Launceston falls under the Chase Benefice (formed in 2001), the deanery of Milton and Blandford, the archdeaconry of Dorset, the diocese of Salisbury, and the province of Canterbury.
