= Tarrant Rawston =

Hamlet in Dorset, England

Coordinates: 50.859°N 2.088°W

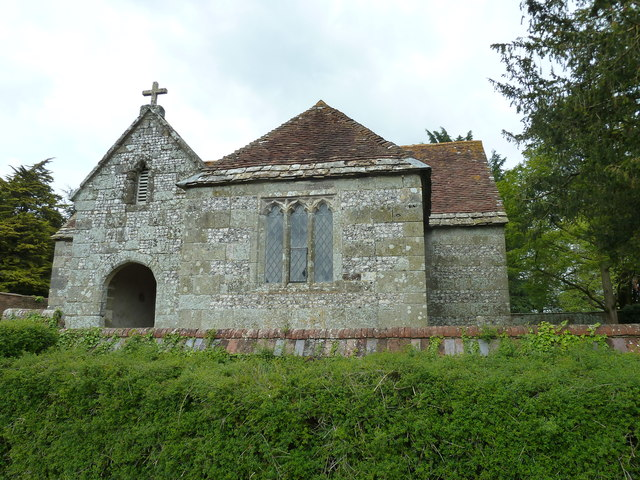
- Former parish church of St Mary

- Location within Dorset
- Population: 40
- OS grid reference: ST939065
- Unitary authority: Dorset
- Ceremonial county: Dorset
- Region: South West
- Country: England
- Sovereign state: United Kingdom
- Post town: BLANDFORD FORUM
- Postcode district: DT11
- Police: Dorset
- Fire: Dorset and Wiltshire
- Ambulance: South Western
- UK Parliament: North Dorset

Tarrant Rawston is a hamlet and civil parish in the county of Dorset in southern England. It is named after the River Tarrant which flows through the parish. It has a small church, built of flint and stone, which is situated within the garden of the neighbouring farmhouse. Surrounding the village are many pre-historic barrows. In 2013 the civil parish had an estimated population of 40.
