= Pimperne =

Village and civil parish in Dorset, England

Coordinates: 50.884°N 2.136°W

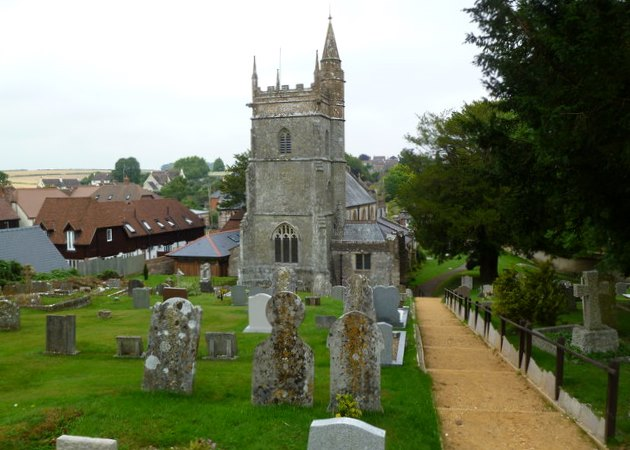
- Parish church of St Peter, Pimperne

- Location within Dorset
- Population: 1,109 (in 2011)
- OS grid reference: ST905093
- Unitary authority: Dorset
- Ceremonial county: Dorset
- Region: South West
- Country: England
- Sovereign state: United Kingdom
- Post town: BLANDFORD FORUM
- Postcode district: DT11
- Dialling code: 01258
- Police: Dorset
- Fire: Dorset and Wiltshire
- Ambulance: South Western
- UK Parliament: North Dorset

Pimperne (/ˈpɪmpərn/ PIM-pərn) is a village and civil parish in north Dorset, England, situated on Cranborne Chase two miles (three kilometres) northeast of the town of Blandford Forum. At the 2011 census the civil parish had 478 households and a population of 1109.

The first records of Pimperne are in Domesday Book in the late 11th century, where it is recorded as "Pinpre", but it is believed that the village goes back to Anglo-Saxon times. A Bronze Age settlement was discovered in the barrows to the north of the village. A house found there has been used as the model for all Bronze Age houses, including the reconstruction at Butser Ancient Farm, Hampshire. The parish church of St Peter was rebuilt by Lord Portman of Bryanston in 1872–4, though some Norman features from the previous building, such as the font and chancel arch, were retained.

Pimperne is centred on its pub and the parish church. Other amenities are found in nearby Blandford Forum.

Pimperne parish is within the Cranborne Chase electoral ward, which extends north eastwards through Tarrant Hinton to Ashmore. The ward had a population of 1,993 in the 2011 census and is part of the constituency of North Dorset, which is currently represented in the UK parliament by the Conservative Simon Hoare.

== See also ==
- Pimperne (hundred)
