= Halstock =

Village in Dorset, England

Coordinates: 50.8687°N 2.6555°W

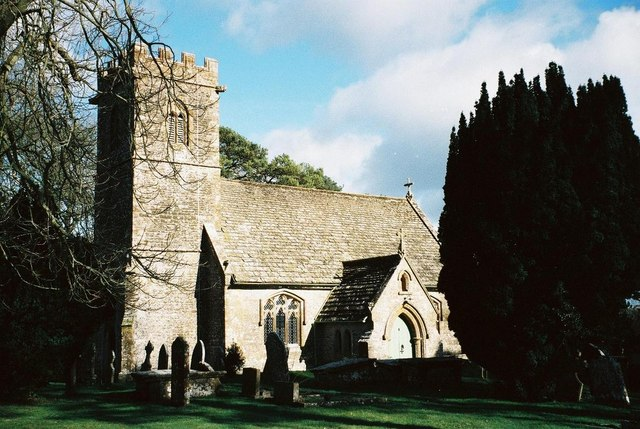
- Parish church of St Juthware and St Mary

- Location within Dorset
- Population: 546
- OS grid reference: ST538080
- Unitary authority: Dorset
- Ceremonial county: Dorset
- Region: South West
- Country: England
- Sovereign state: United Kingdom
- Post town: YEOVIL
- Postcode district: BA22
- Dialling code: 01935
- Police: Dorset
- Fire: Dorset and Wiltshire
- Ambulance: South Western
- UK Parliament: West Dorset

Halstock is a village and civil parish in the county of Dorset in southern England, situated approximately five miles (8.0 km) south of Yeovil in Somerset. It lies on the route of the ancient Harrow Way. In the 2011 census the parish had a population of 546.

Halstock formerly constituted a liberty, containing only the parish itself. It was the site of the martyrdom of Saint Juthwara (Juthware), and a Romano-British Villa excavated between 1967 and 1985.

The village formerly had two inns, "The New Inn" (New Inn Farm), which closed in the late 1950s, and the unusually named "The Quiet Woman" (usually taken as a reference to St Juthware)

In July 2012, Halstock's Parish church of St Mary was rededicated by the Bishop of Sherborne to become "St Juthware and St Mary", in recognition of the local tradition. Much of the church was rebuilt in 1770, with only the 15th-century west tower not being affected. The nave and chancel were rebuilt again on separate dates in the 19th century.

Halstock lies within an electoral ward of the same name, which also contains several nearby parishes including Corscombe, Evershot and Hilfield. The population of this ward at the 2011 census was 1,848. This ward is one of 32 that comprise the West Dorset parliamentary constituency.

== See also ==
- List of liberties in Dorset
