= Tarrant Gunville =

Village and civil parish in Dorset, England

Coordinates: 50.9148°N 2.1073°W

- Flint and brick cottages in Tarrant Gunville

- Location within Dorset
- Population: 233
- OS grid reference: ST926127
- Unitary authority: Dorset
- Ceremonial county: Dorset
- Region: South West
- Country: England
- Sovereign state: United Kingdom
- Post town: BLANDFORD FORUM
- Postcode district: DT11
- Police: Dorset
- Fire: Dorset and Wiltshire
- Ambulance: South Western
- UK Parliament: North Dorset

Tarrant Gunville is a village and civil parish in north Dorset, England, situated at the head of the Tarrant Valley on Cranborne Chase five miles (eight kilometres) northeast of Blandford Forum. The parish covers 3,469 acres (1,404 hectares) at an elevation of 70 to 170 metres (230 to 560 feet). In the 2011 census the parish—which includes the settlement of Stubhampton to the north—had 119 dwellings, 108 households and a population of 233.

The parish has three round barrows and an unexcavated Iron Age enclosure with a 15' deep ditch, which Pevsner suspects was built in a hurry.

The medieval settlements in the parish were Stubhampton and Gunville. The parish church, dedicated to St Mary, is on the edge of Tarrant Gunville. It is on the site of an earlier building which probably dated from around 1100. The present building has a south porch, aisles and tower arch that are partly 14th-century, and a 15th-century west tower that was partly rebuilt in the 16th century, but the chancel and nave were rebuilt in 1843. The architect of the rebuilding was Thomas Henry Wyatt.

Eastbury House, the surviving part of a much larger house designed by John Vanbrugh and built between 1717 and 1738, stands just east of Tarrant Gunville village. The larger part of the house was demolished in 1782. The grounds still display evidence of the original gardens, designed by Charles Bridgeman. It is probable that several of the ashlar and flint houses in the village were built using material taken from the demolished house. The photographer Thomas Wedgwood moved into the surviving part of Eastbury in 1800; his brother, the potter Josiah, had bought nearby Gunville House in 1799, shortly after its construction.

The modern village hall was completed in 2001.

There are 23 structures in the parish that are listed by English Heritage for their special historical or architectural interest. These include Eastbury House (Grade I) and the parish church (Grade II*).
