= East Chelborough =

Village and civil parish in Dorset, England

Coordinates: 50.85035°N 2.63738°W

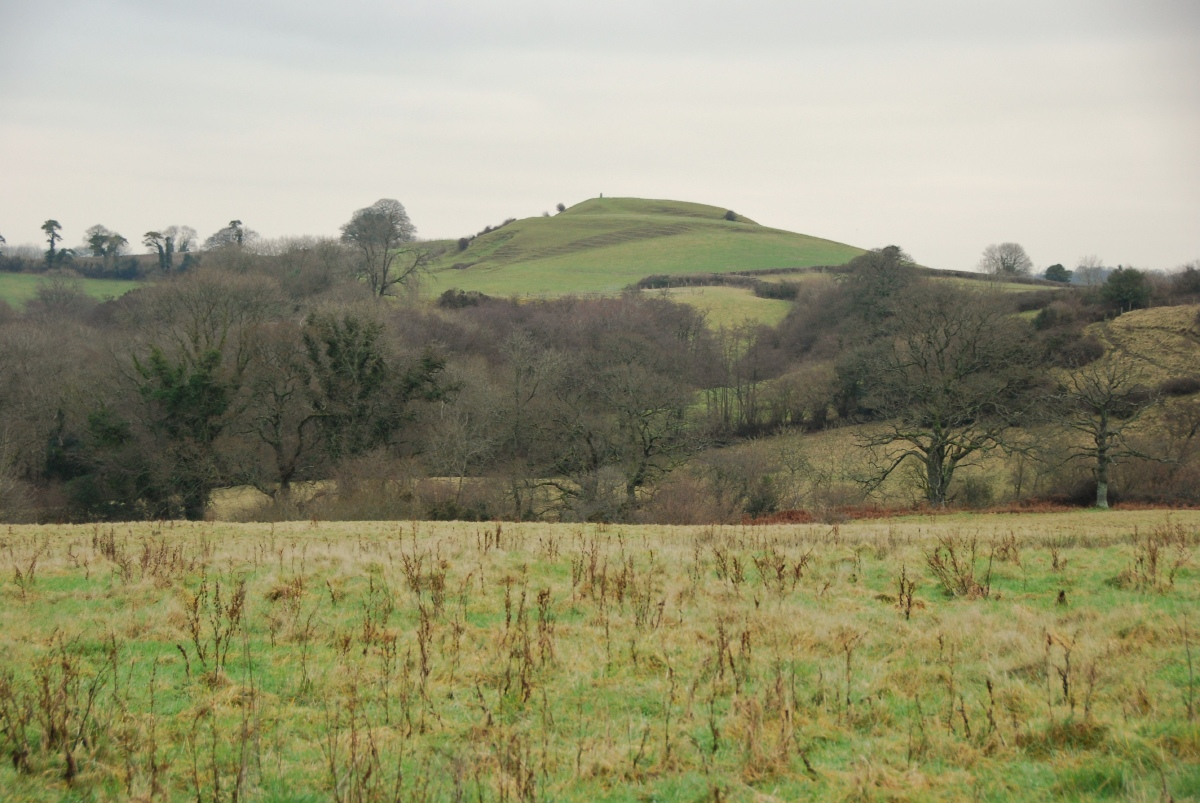
- East Chelborough Castle Hill

- Location within Dorset
- Population: 50
- OS grid reference: ST552057
- Unitary authority: Dorset
- Ceremonial county: Dorset
- Region: South West
- Country: England
- Sovereign state: United Kingdom
- Post town: Dorchester
- Postcode district: DT2
- Police: Dorset
- Fire: Dorset and Wiltshire
- Ambulance: South Western
- UK Parliament: West Dorset

East Chelborough is a small village and civil parish 7 miles (11 km) north-east of Beaminster in Dorset, England. Dorset County Council estimated in 2013 that the population of the parish was 50.

On the top of the ridge at the nearby Castle Hill are the earthwork remains of a motte-and-bailey castle.
