= Hilton, Dorset =

Village in Dorset, England

Coordinates: 50.8261°N 2.3106°W

Hilton
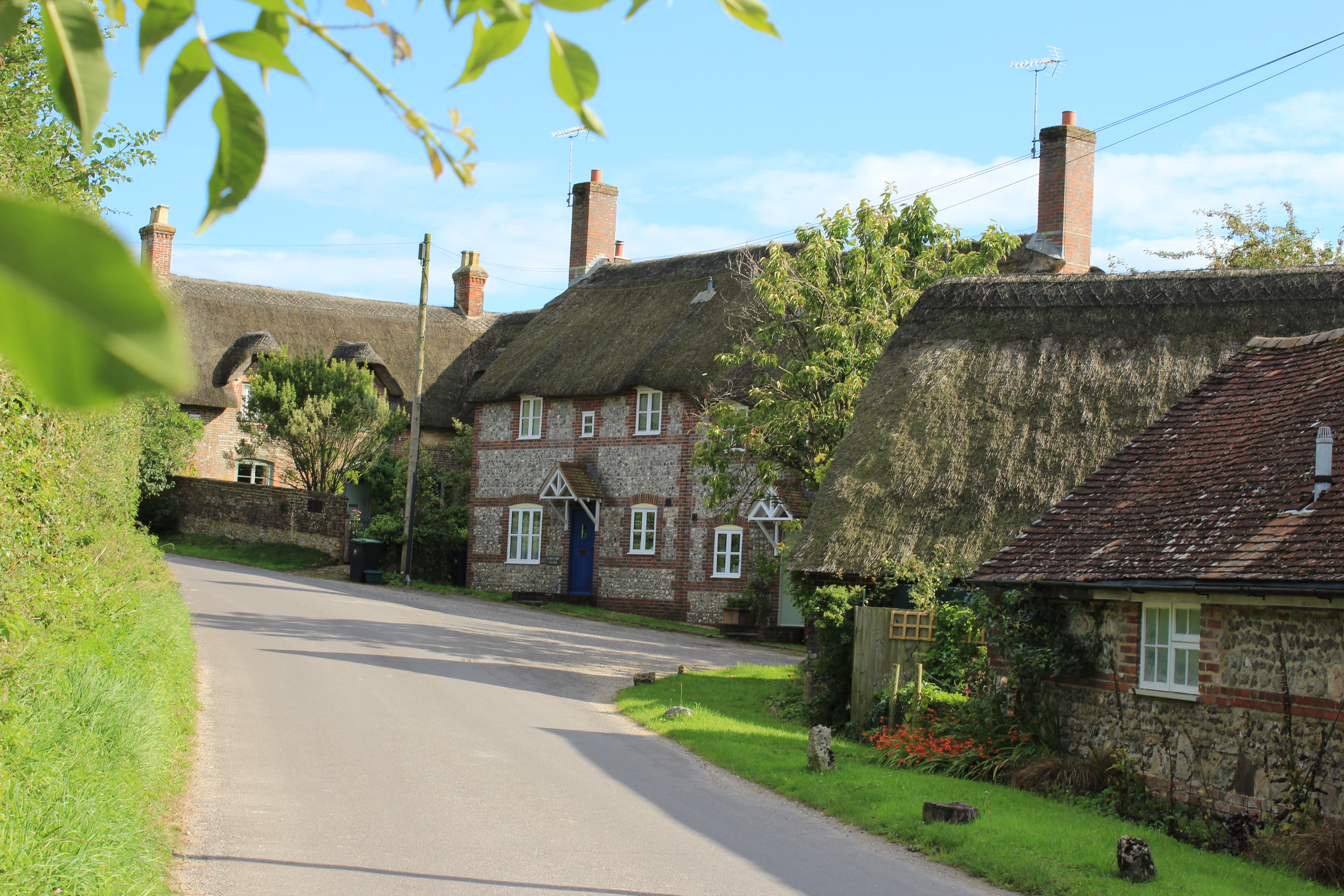
- Hilton

- Location within Dorset
- Population: 477
- OS grid reference: ST782030
- Unitary authority: Dorset
- Ceremonial county: Dorset
- Region: South West
- Country: England
- Sovereign state: United Kingdom
- Post town: Blandford Forum
- Postcode district: DT11
- Police: Dorset
- Fire: Dorset and Wiltshire
- Ambulance: South Western
- UK Parliament: North Dorset

Hilton is a village and civil parish in the county of Dorset in southern England. It is sited at an elevation of 135 metres (443 feet) in a small valley which drains chalk hills in the eastern part of the Dorset Downs, approximately 8 miles (13 kilometres) west-southwest of the town of Blandford Forum. The summit of Bulbarrow Hill (274 m or 899 ft) is 1 1/2 miles (2.5 kilometres) north of the village. In the 2011 census the parish—which includes the settlement of Ansty to the west—had 231 dwellings, 206 households and a population of 477.

Hilton used to form a part of the estate of the nearby Milton Abbey when it was owned by the rich Hambro family; the Hambros, who often used to entertain Edward VII, planted woods on the surrounding hills, to provide cover for pheasants. However the woods surrounding Hilton today are mostly post-war plantations of beech (Fagus sylvatica) and ash (Fraxinus excelsior) as the hills were cleared during WW2. Large areas are privately owned, although there are open access areas owned and managed by the Forestry Commission.

The church of All Saints is a typical Dorset country church and is mainly in the late Gothic style. In the north aisle a fine range of windows from the cloisters of Milton Abbey have been reused. The fan vault in the porch probably comes from the same source. Also from the abbey are a set of 12 panels with paintings of the Apostles: these are of high quality and early 16th century in date.

In 1870–72, John Marius Wilson's Imperial Gazetteer of England and Wales described Hilton like this:

HILTON, a parish in Blandford district, Dorset; under Bulbarrow camp, 7 1/2 miles [12 kilometres] WSW of Blandford town and r. station. It contains the hamlets of Aller, Anstey, and Hartsfoot-Lane; and its post town is Milton-Abbas, under Blandford. Acres, 2, 974. Real property, £3, 945. Pop., 833. Houses, 162. The property is divided among a few. Orchards and gardens occupy considerable space. Slate, coal, and bog iron abound; and some gold has been found. There are many mineral springs. Druidical remains, Roman urns and coins, early English coins, and other ancient relics have been found. The living is a vicarage in the diocese of Salisbury. Value, £.273.* Patron, the Bishop of Salisbury. The church is tolerable, and has a tower.
