= Bulbarrow Hill =

Hill in Dorset, England

Coordinates: 50.85034°N 2.33235°W

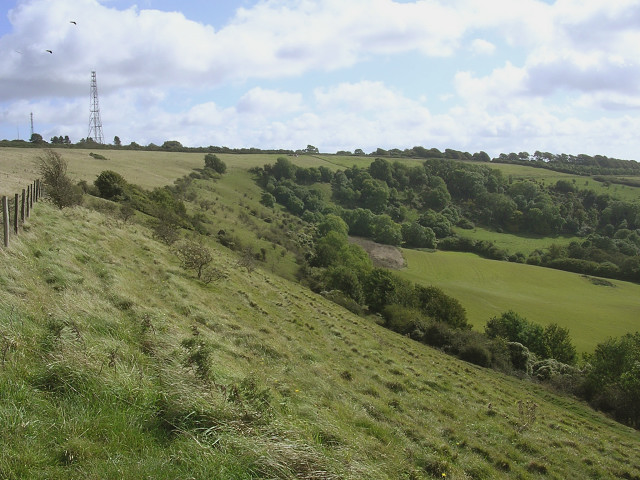
- Bulbarrow Hill and Balmers Coombe Bottom, looking east from the footpath to Rawlsbury Camp

Highest point
- Elevation: 274 m (899 ft)
- Prominence: 141 m (463 ft)
- Parent peak: Lewesdon Hill
- Listing: HuMP, sub-Marilyn

Geography
- Location: Dorset, England
- Parent range: Dorset Downs
- OS grid: ST779056
- Topo map(s): OS Landranger 194; Explorer 117E

Bulbarrow Hill is a 274 metres (899 ft) hill near Woolland, five miles west of Blandford Forum and ten miles (16 km) north of Dorchester in Dorset, England. The chalk hill is part of the scarp of Dorset Downs, which form the western end of the Southern England Chalk Formation. Part of the hill is used for arable agriculture, but most is calcareous grassland. The hill overlooks the Blackmore Vale, and offers views of Dorset, Somerset, Wiltshire and Devon.

Rawlsbury Camp, a five acre Iron Age hill fort, is situated on a promontory of the hill. Little remains of the camp except the twin embankments and intermediate ditch which surrounded it. The hill gets its name from the several barrows that adorn the hill. Additionally, a medieval trackway crosses the ridge.

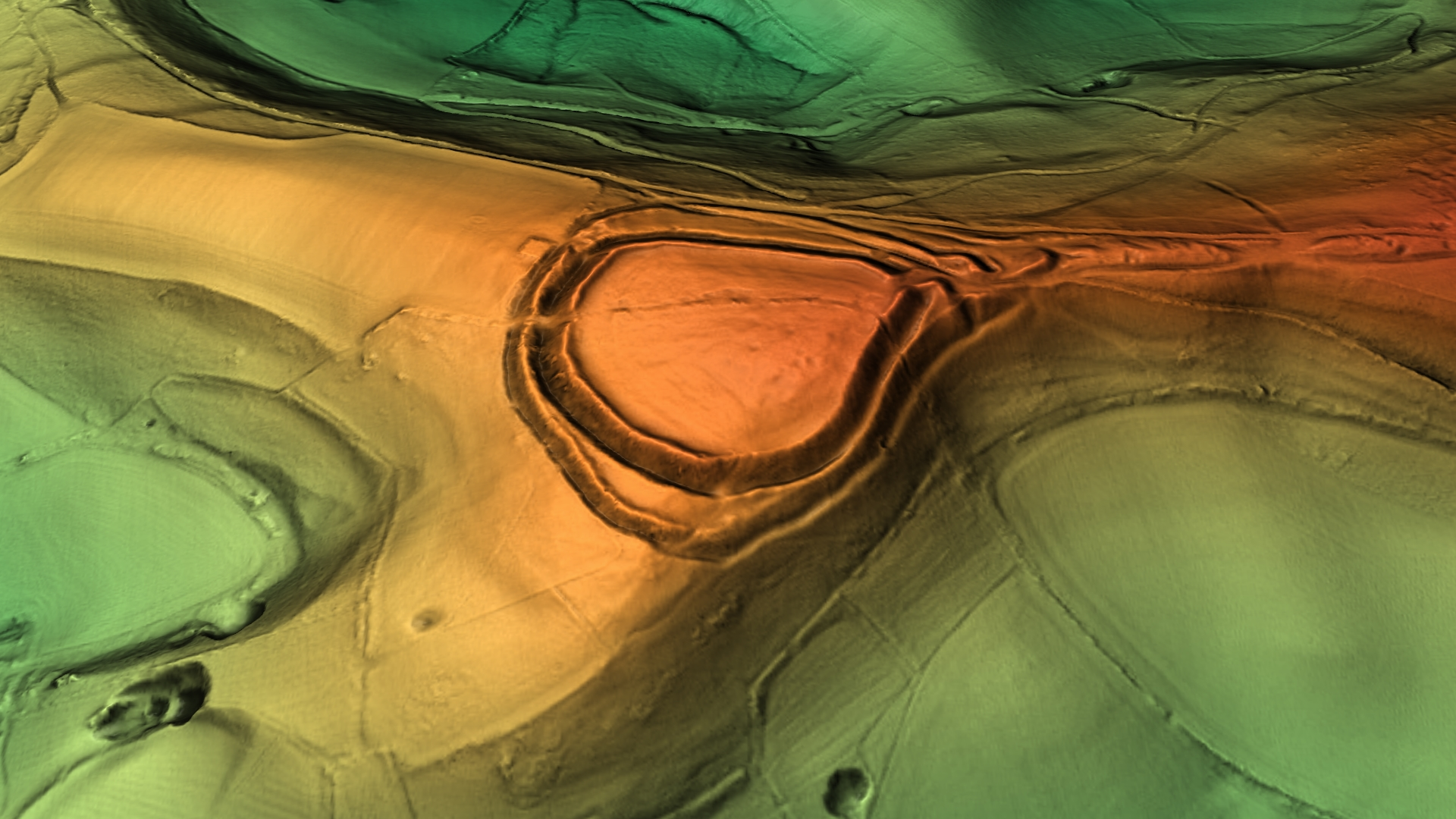
A 3D digital terrain model of Bulbarrow Hill that shows the remains of the hillfort

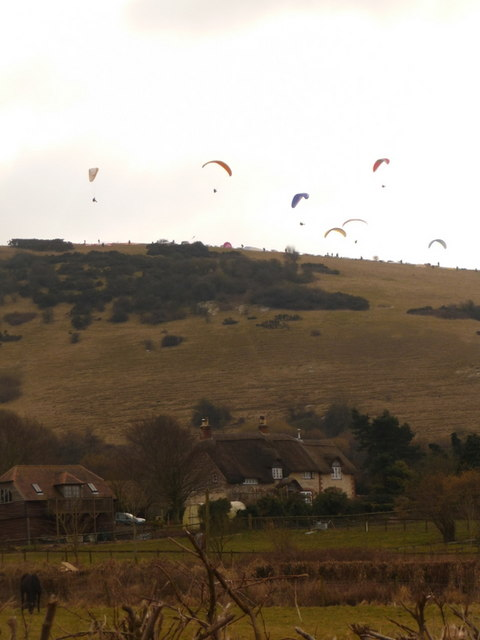
A group of gliders above Bulbarrow Hill

The hill is a popular launch site for paragliders. The TV presenter Jack Hargreaves who died in 1994 had his ashes spread on Bulbarrow Hill above his home, Raven Cottage.

Bulbarrow Hill features heavily in the song Third Track Main Camera Four Minutes by the indie band Half Man Half Biscuit.

== Radio towers ==
Bulbarrow Hill has been used for radio towers since 1942. In 1942, the RAF installed a Gee station there as the master of the "southern" Gee chain. This station had wooden masts. the Gee station was used until 1957. The USAF then used the site together with a site at Ringstead. As of 2016, the site is used for telecommunication masts. The twin radio transmitter towers are used by the emergency services.
