= Tarrant Keyneston =

Village and civil parish in Dorset, England

Coordinates: 50.8403°N 2.0985°W

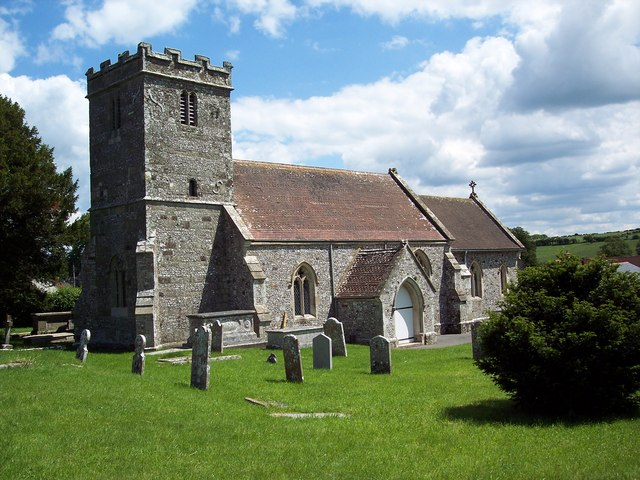
- All Saints' Church, Tarrant Keyneston

- Location within Dorset
- Population: 310 (2011)
- OS grid reference: ST923047
- Civil parish: Tarrant Keyneston
- Unitary authority: Dorset
- Ceremonial county: Dorset
- Region: South West
- Country: England
- Sovereign state: United Kingdom
- Post town: BLANDFORD FORUM
- Postcode district: DT11
- Dialling code: 01258
- Police: Dorset
- Fire: Dorset and Wiltshire
- Ambulance: South Western
- UK Parliament: North Dorset

Tarrant Keyneston is a village and civil parish in Dorset, England. It is situated in the Tarrant Valley, five miles (eight kilometres) southeast of Blandford Forum. In the 2011 census the parish had 152 dwellings, 145 households and a population of 310.

On the hills northwest of the village are the earthworks of Buzbury Rings (or Busbury Rings), the remains of an Iron Age and Romano-British fortified encampment or settlement, described by Sir Frederick Treves in 1905 as "a circle of entrenchments, composed of a stout vallum and a ditch". The outer enclosure covers about 10 acres (4 hectares) and within this is an inner enclosure, covering about 3 acres (1.2 hectares), which is the location of most of the finds from the site, including Roman pottery, animal bones and daub imprinted by wattles. The site has been much damaged by ploughing and by the road between Wimborne Minster and Blandford Forum, which crosses the site.

The village's parish church has a 15th-century tower, though the rest of the building was rebuilt in 1852 by Thomas Henry Wyatt. The chancel of the earlier building contained an anchorite's cell. The Bishop of Salisbury Richard Poore is most likely to have been buried at Tarrant Keyneston in accordance with his wishes.

Almost all of Tarrant Keyneston parish is within the Cranborne Chase and West Wiltshire Downs Area of Outstanding Natural Beauty (AONB).
