= Tarrant Hinton =

Village and civil parish in Dorset, England

Coordinates: 50.8988°N 2.09°W

- Tarrant Hinton

- Location within Dorset
- Population: 160
- OS grid reference: ST937110
- Unitary authority: Dorset
- Ceremonial county: Dorset
- Region: South West
- Country: England
- Sovereign state: United Kingdom
- Post town: BLANDFORD FORUM
- Postcode district: DT11
- Dialling code: 01258
- Police: Dorset
- Fire: Dorset and Wiltshire
- Ambulance: South Western
- UK Parliament: North Dorset

Tarrant Hinton is a village and civil parish in the county of Dorset in southern England. It is situated in the Tarrant Valley, approximately five miles (eight kilometres) northeast of Blandford Forum. In 2013 the estimated population of the civil parish was 160.

== History ==
The village's name appears in medieval sources. In 935, King Æthelstan granted land at Tarrant Hinton to the nuns of Shaftesbury Abbey under condition that they would pray hard for the king.

== Community ==
Tarrant Hinton Church

The village no longer has a public house, shop or post office, but it has a medieval parish church and a newly rebuilt village hall. In 2001 the ecclesiastical parish of Tarrant Hinton was grouped with nine other surrounding parishes to form the Chase Benefice in the Anglican Diocese of Salisbury. There is a local church benefice newsletter published regularly called the Tarrant Times.

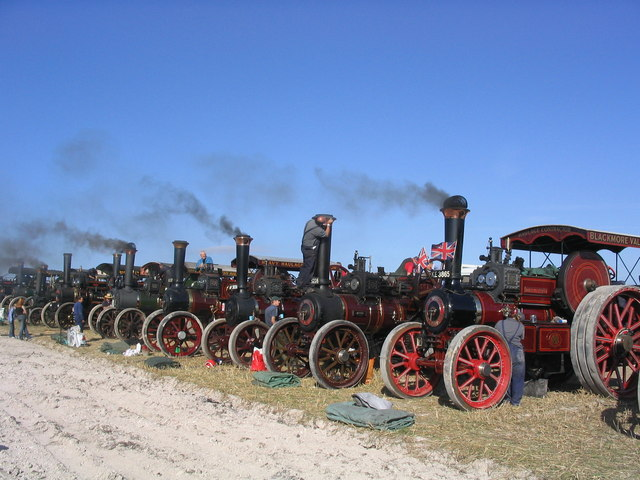
A line of traction engines at the Great Dorset Steam Fair 2005

Tarrant Hinton is well known as the location of the Great Dorset Steam Fair, which is annually visited by some 200,000 people.

== Governance ==
Tarrant Hinton parish falls under the Dorset Council ward of Hill Forts and Upper Tarrants, and the parliamentary constituency of North Dorset. The current MP (since 2015) is Simon Hoare of the Conservative Party.
