= Gussage St Michael =

Village in Dorset, England

Coordinates: 50.902°N 2.021°W

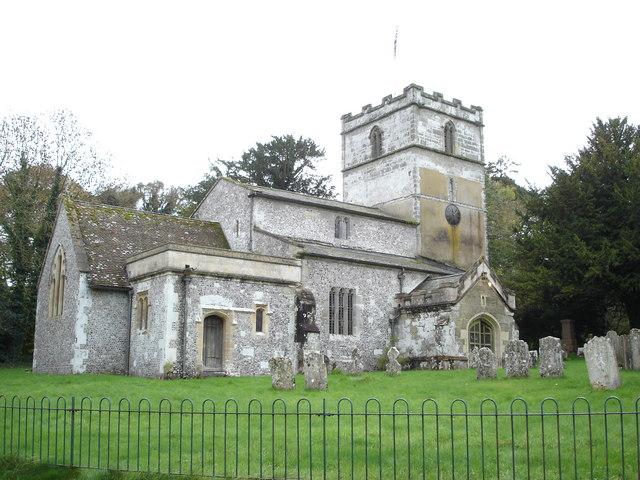
- St Michael's church

- Location within Dorset
- Population: 219
- OS grid reference: ST985113
- Civil parish: Gussage St Michael
- Unitary authority: Dorset
- Ceremonial county: Dorset
- Region: South West
- Country: England
- Sovereign state: United Kingdom
- Post town: WIMBORNE
- Postcode district: BH21
- Dialling code: 01258
- Police: Dorset
- Fire: Dorset and Wiltshire
- Ambulance: South Western
- UK Parliament: North Dorset

Gussage Saint Michael is a small village in Dorset, in the south of England. At the 2001 census, the village had a population of 219. Gussage St Michael is tucked off the main A354 as it runs through the Cranborne Chase, ten miles from Blandford Forum and fourteen miles from Salisbury. The village has no local shops, with the nearest store being in Cranborne, some 6 miles (10 km) away. The nearest public house is the Drovers Inn, a mile down a country lane in the sister village of Gussage All Saints.

The ecclesiastical parish of Gussage St Michael has recently merged with neighbouring Gussage All Saints and joined the Knowlton Circle Benefice which also includes the parishes of Cranborne, Edmondsham, Wimborne St Giles and Woodlands.

== See also ==
- Gussage
