= River Allen, Dorset =

River in Dorset, England

River Allen
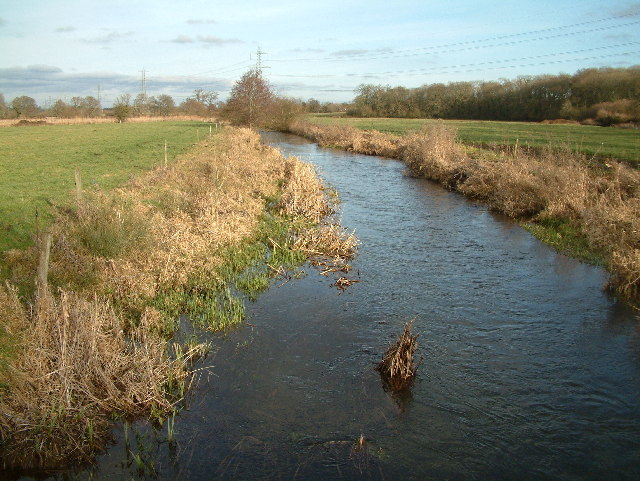
- The river close to Furzehill

- Location within Dorset

Location
- Country: England
- County: Dorset

Physical characteristics
- Source
  - location: Monkton Up Wimborne, Dorset
  - coordinates: 50°55′15.1″N 1°58′52.6″W
- Mouth
  - location: Wimborne Minster, Dorset
  - coordinates: 50°47′33.4″N 1°58′43.3″W
- Length: 14 mi (23 km)
- Basin size: 40 sq mi (100 km^{2})

Basin features
- Tributaries
  - right: Gussage Stream, Crichel Stream

The River Allen is a river in Dorset in South West England. It flows for 14 miles (23 km) to its confluence with the River Stour at Wimborne Minster. It has two main tributaries, the Gussage Stream and the Crichel Stream.

== Route ==
The River Allen starts as a winterbourne at Wyke Farm in Monkton Up Wimborne, on the chalk downland of Cranborne Chase. It flows roughly southwards on the dip slope of the downland through Wimborne St Giles, and is joined by the Gussage stream at Gussage All Saints and the Crichel stream south of Moor Crichel, before passing through Witchampton and Hinton Parva, where the landscape transitions from chalk downland to broad valley. Finally, at Wimborne Minster, it flows into the Stour immediately south the town beside the old Canford Bridge across the Stour to Oakley. The river is known as a classic chalk stream which supports a good fishery for trout and used to support a good salmonid population. Much of the riverbank is privately owned by two estates, including the Shaftesbury Estate at the source. There are

== Watermills ==
There have been a number of corn mills on the river. Loverley Mill at Crichel survives as a Grade II listed building. Originally there were two waterwheels but they were replaced in the early 20th century by a water turbine driving a pump to supply water to Crichel House. Other mills were Hinton Farm Mill, Stanbridge Mill and Didlington Mill.

== Environment ==
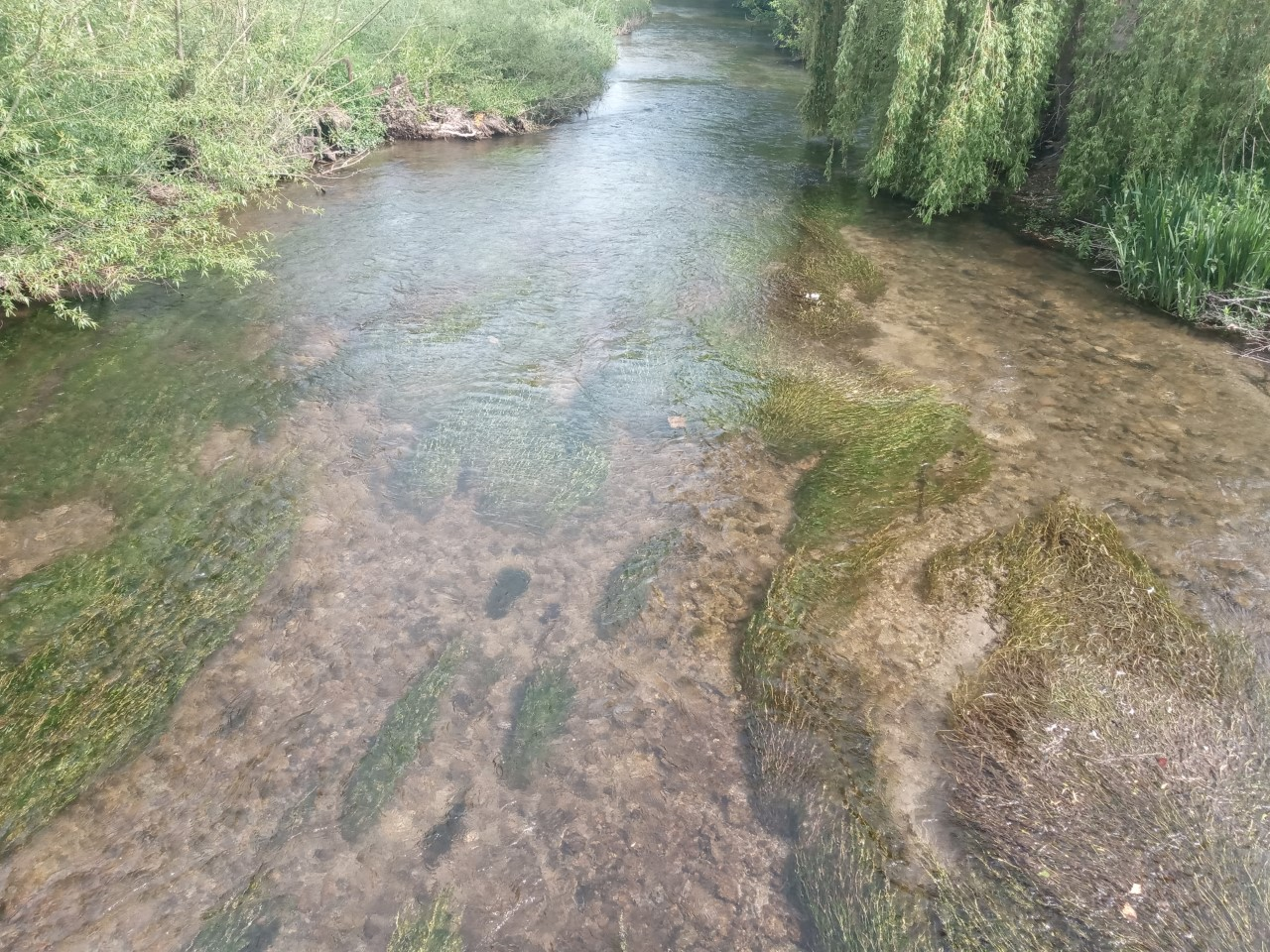
Aquatic vegetation in the River Allen

Since 1946, the water from the Allen has been abstracted for domestic and industrial use. The amount of water taken was having a detrimental effect on the river flow whilst at the same time the salmonid population dropped significantly. Studies have been undertaken into a correlation between the two events and resulted in the abstraction rate being reduced by 50%. Over the last twenty years there has been an increase in arable farming (wheat, barley, oats oilseed rape and peas) as well as some watercress farming discharge reaching the river. The Allen is one of several rivers that are subject to a major restoration project led by Dorset Wildlife Trust with funding from Wessex Water and Dorset Area of Outstanding Natural Beauty.

The Allen had the strongest population of white clawed crayfish in Dorset, and measures such as tree planting and slowing the flow of the river were implemented to help the species. However, an outbreak of Crayfish plague was discovered on the river in 2014, with at least 100 of the native species found dead in the river. The river also has an abundance of macrophytes including the two most abundant taxa: common water-crowfoot (Ranunculus aquatilis) and bur-reeds (Sparganium). As well as an abundance of brown trout the river is home to minnow, dace, grayling, salmon, perch, roach, pike, bullhead and brook lamprey and the critically endangered European eel.

=== Water quality ===
The Environment Agency measure water quality of the river systems in England. Each is given an overall ecological status, which may be one of five levels: high, good, moderate, poor and bad. There are several components that are used to determine this, including biological status, which looks at the quantity and varieties of invertebrates, angiosperms and fish. Chemical status, which compares the concentrations of various chemicals against known safe concentrations, is rated good or fail.

Water quality of the River Allen in 2016:

Section	Ecological Status	Chemical Status	Overall Status	Length	Catchment	Channel
Allen (Headwaters)	Good	Good	Good	10.285 km (6.391 mi)	53.856 km^{2} (20.794 sq mi)	
Allen (Lower)	Good	Good	Good	12.646 km (7.858 mi)	52.554 km^{2} (20.291 sq mi)	
Allen trib (Gussage Stream)	Good	Good	Good	6.222 km (3.866 mi)	43.634 km^{2} (16.847 sq mi)	
Allen trib (Crichel Stream)	Good	Good	Good	7.93 km (4.93 mi)	22.656 km^{2} (8.748 sq mi)	
