= Cranborne Priory =

Cranborne Priory Church
- Church of St Mary and St Bartholomew, Cranborne
- Cranborne Abbey Church
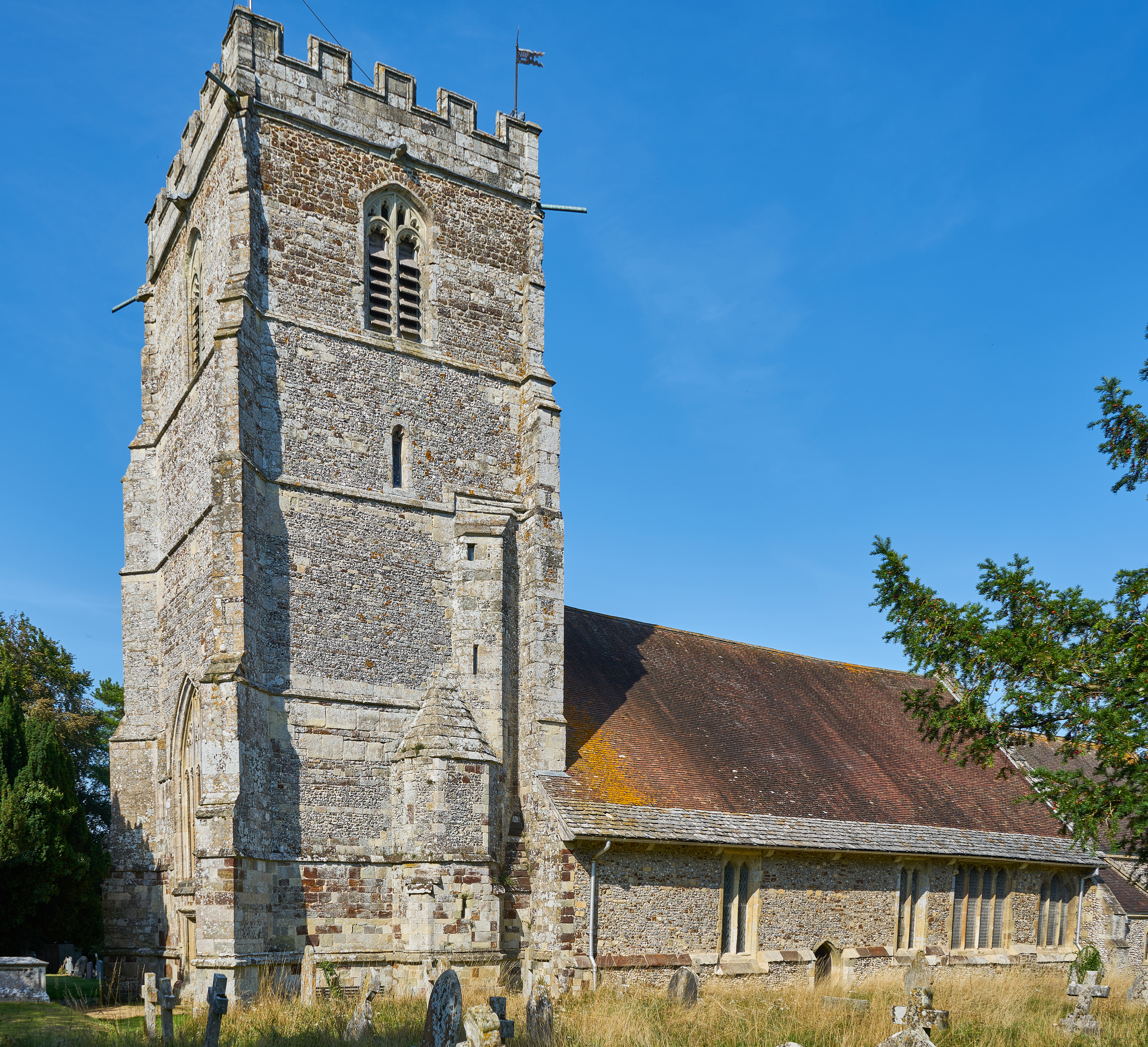

- Location in Dorset
- OS grid reference: SU 05453 13247
- Location: Cranborne, Dorset
- Country: England
- Denomination: Anglican

History
- Former name(s): Priory Church of St Mary, St Peter, and St Bartholomew; Abbey Church of St Mary
- Dedication: Virgin Mary, Bartholomew

Architecture
- Functional status: Parish church
- Style: Norman, Early English Gothic, Decorated Gothic, Perpendicular Gothic, Gothic Revival
- Years built: 1120–1875

Specifications
- Length: 148 ft (45 m)
- Materials: Stone

Administration
- Province: Canterbury
- Diocese: Salisbury
- Archdeaconry: Dorset
- Deanery: Wimborne
- Benefice: Cranborne with Boveridge

Clergy
- Vicar: Revd Robert David Simpson

Listed Building – Grade I
- Official name: Church of St Mary and St Bartholomew
- Designated: 18 March 1955
- Reference no.: 1120181

Cranborne Priory
- Interactive map of Cranborne Priory

Monastery information
- Other name: Cranborne Abbey
- Order: Benedictine
- Established: c. 980
- Disestablished: 31 January 1540
- Mother house: Tewkesbury Abbey
- Dedication: Virgin Mary

People
- Founder: Aylward Sneaw

Cranborne Priory is a former priory church in the village of Cranborne, Dorset, England. Founded in 980 as Cranborne Abbey, it became a priory in 1102, remaining that way until it was dissolved in 1540. The tower, nave and aisles from the priory survive to form the Church of St Mary and St Bartholomew, the parish church of Cranborne. The building, which has fragments from the 12th century, is designated a Grade I listed building.

The surviving church is notable for its large west tower, considered "amongst the finest in East Dorset", three medieval wall paintings and numerous monuments.

== History ==
=== Benedictine abbey (980–1102) ===
In a manuscript by William Dugdale, housed in the Ashmolean Museum, it is stated that in ancient times there was a college of six monks at Cranborne, built in memory of certain Britons who were slain in battle there. Some of the earliest history comes from the chronicle of Tewkesbury, which states that in 930, during the reign of Athelstan, there was a knight named Aylward Sneaw (also known as Aethelweard Maew), nicknamed 'Snow' for his pale complexion. Aylward founded an abbey at Cranborne, dedicated to the Virgin Mary, no later than 980. Aylward was patron of the monastery at Tewkesbury, which he made entirely subservient to the new monastery at Cranborne, thus making Tewkesbury a priory. Aylward later died, and was buried in his monastery at Cranborne. His descendants expanded the monastery by enlarging it and rebuilding it over generations.

Following the Norman Conquest of 1066, the holder of the manor, Brihtric, was imprisoned by William the Conqueror in Winchester Castle for an act of disrespect against his wife, Queen Matilda. His estate, including the monastery at Cranborne, was confiscated, and granted to Robert Fitzhamon, a Norman nobleman.

The Domesday Book of 1086 records that Cranborne Abbey was one of the most important monastic foundations in the region, holding at its maximum extent some 13,000 acres (20 sq mi) of land across four counties, including in Gillingham (Dorset), Damerham (Hampshire), Ashton Keynes (Wiltshire) and Loosebeare, near Crediton (Devon).

By 1102, Fitzhamon had become lord of Tewkesbury, and the monastery there was in ruins. When Fitzhamon and the abbot of Cranborne, Giraldus, worked to rebuild the monastery there, they realised that Tewkesbury was much better sited, offering strategic importance due to its location at the confluence of two rivers, the Severn and the Avon, as well as more fertile land and better access to water, compared to Cranborne's small River Crane. As such, the situation of 980 was reversed, Cranborne now becoming entirely subservient to Tewkesbury. Subsequently, in 1102, Giraldus, now abbot of Tewkesbury, accompanied by fifty-seven monks, left Cranborne for Tewkesbury Abbey.

=== Priory (1102–1540) ===
Cranborne, now a priory church under control of Tewkesbury, was left with one prior and two monks, its importance greatly reduced. Much of the history of the priory is lost, being interwoven with that of Tewkesbury. It is known however that almost all of the main church building was demolished and rebuilt during the early to mid 13th century, reconsecrated in 1252, dedicated to St Mary, St Peter and St Bartholomew. Further additions and rebuilding took place over the following centuries, including rebuilding the tower and roof in the 15th century.

In 1535, the yearly income of Cranborne Priory amounted to £55 6s 1d, surveyed as part of Valor Ecclesiasticus, a nationwide examination of the Church of England's finance ordered by Henry VIII.

On 31 January 1540, both Cranborne Priory and Tewkesbury Abbey were surrendered to Henry VIII as part of the Dissolution of the Monasteries. William Dydcotte, last prior of Cranborne, received a pension of £10. The manor of the priory, valued at £14 3s 3d, was sold to Robert Freke. The monastic buildings were demolished in 1703.

=== Parish church (1540–present) ===
The priory church survived almost in its entirety following dissolution, save for the cloisters and monastic buildings. Little is known about the condition of the church until the mid 19th century, when several parts of the building were rebuilt or restored. In 1855, the north porch was altered, before being rebuilt in 1873. From 1874 to 1875, the medieval chancel was demolished and rebuilt in the Gothic Revival style to designs by David Brandon, and the north vestry enlarged concurrently. Further work was carried out from 1877 to 1910 by the Rev. F. H. Fisher, including replacement of the chancel screen, reredos and tower screen. The wagon roof of the nave was restored in 1958.

== Architecture ==
=== Overview ===
Much of the priory church survives as the parish church of Cranborne, dedicated to St Mary and St Bartholomew, though the chancel and east end were rebuilt in the 19th century. The oldest part of the building is the Norman doorway in the porch, which dates back to 1120, and features recessed arches and dog-tooth carvings. 12th-century fragments also survive in the lower parts of the south aisle wall, and the nave piers. For a relatively small village, the church is large and spacious, displaying every style of architecture from the late Norman period to the more decorative Perpendicular Gothic era. The building is 148 feet (45 m) long, and has an area of 618 square metres (6,650 sq ft), which according to the Church of England makes it a "large" sized building.

=== Exterior ===
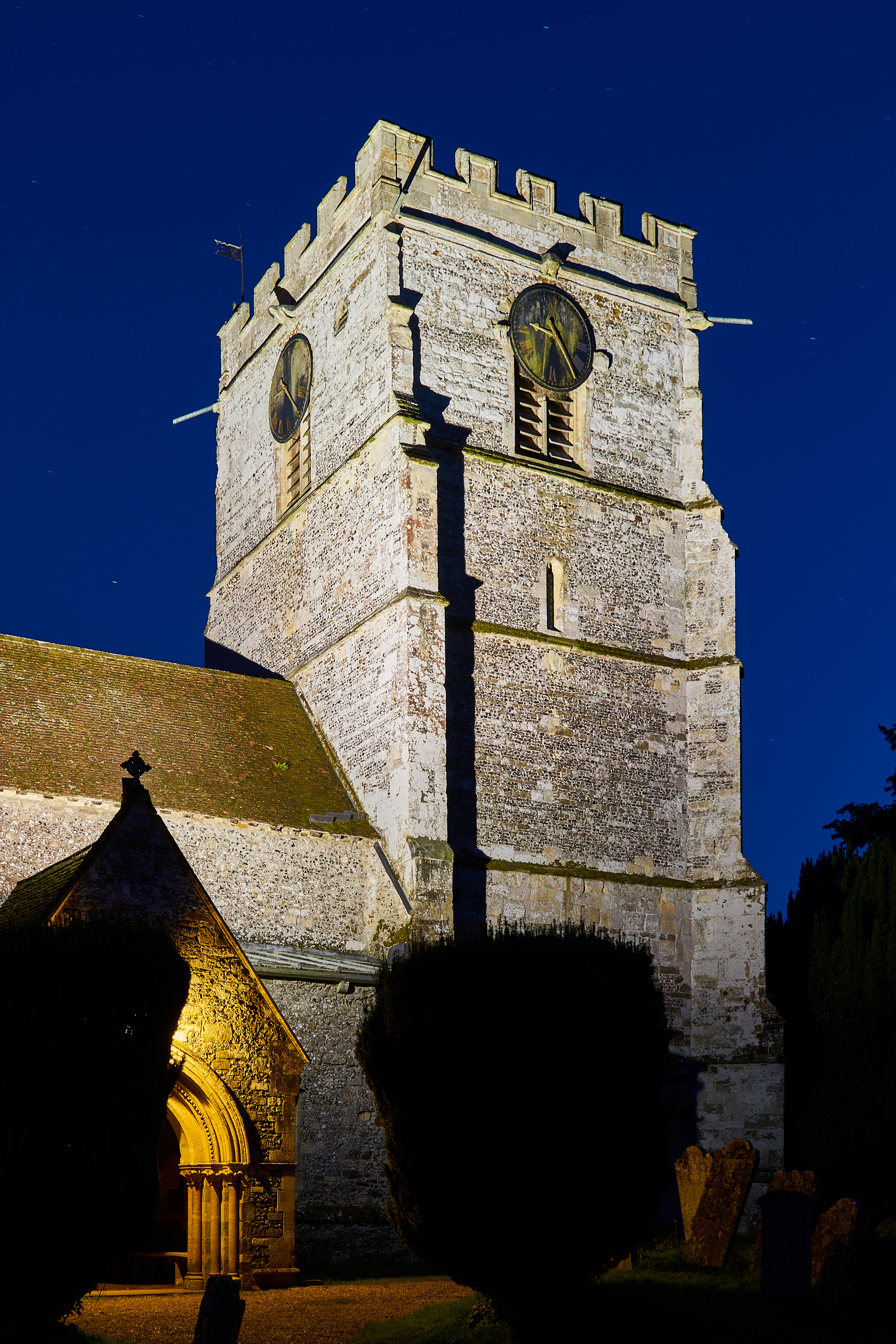
The 75-feet-high west tower, floodlit by night

The church has an impressive exterior, dominated by the substantial west tower, which rises some 75 feet (23 m) from ground level, making it amongst the largest in any village church in Dorset. Historic England describe it as "massive, of 5 stages". An octagonal stair turret rises from the ground floor in two stages on the south face of the tower. The tower was built in 1440 at the expense of Richard, Duke of York, in the Perpendicular Gothic style, featuring a large west window, a pointed and moulded west doorway and two clock faces on the north and east sides. His coat of arms can be seen on a shield outside the west door. The tower and nave are floodlit at night.

==== Building materials ====
Cranborne, like several other churches in East Dorset such as Wimborne Minster and Hampreston, is built from a variety of stone types. The newer parts of the church, the chancel and vestry are built externally from flint, with windows cased in Bath stone. The north nave aisle is built from a mixture of rough flint, Chilmark stone and Heathstone. The porch, rebuilt in the mid 19th century contains Upper Greensand and Chilmark Oolite, in addition to flint, Heathstone and Bath stone. The south aisle uses much the same materials as the north aisle, except with the occasional piece of conglomerate. The tower contains a mixture of all of these and additionally ashlar, the proportion of flint compared to the other stones increasing further up the tower. The roof is a mixture of tiles and flint.

The interior of the church features Purbeck marble, famous for its use in Salisbury Cathedral, for the nave columns, sandwiched between two layers of Chilmark Oolite. The nave ceiling is a plasterboard barrel vault, supported by oak beams.

=== Interior ===
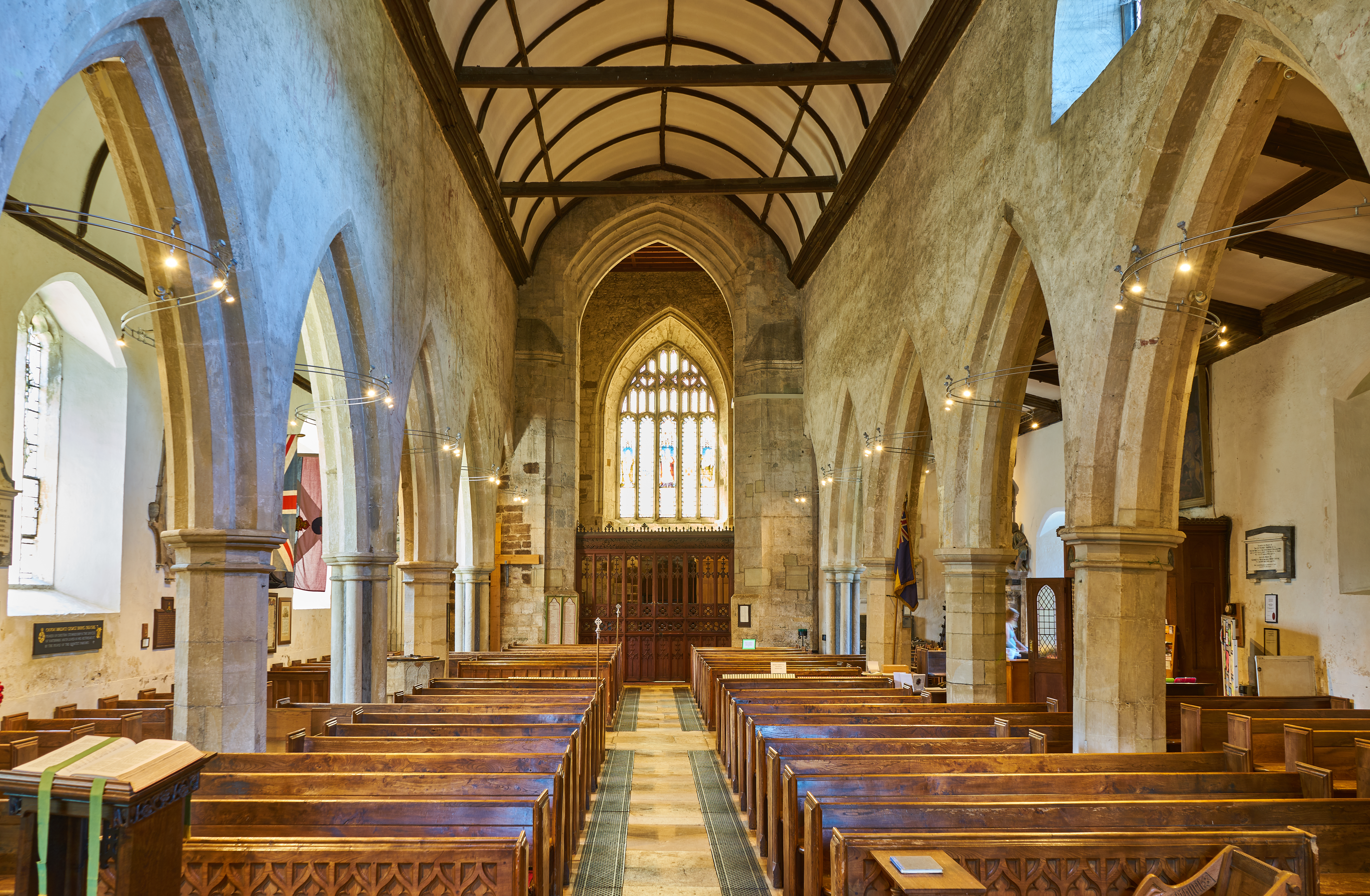
Nave, looking west

The nave is of six bays, featuring both north and south aisles, and dates back to the mid 13th century, built in the Early English Gothic style, with a later 15th century barrel vaulted ceiling. The upper nave walls, pierced by two clerestory windows on the north side, contain three medieval wall paintings, dated to between 1240 and 1400. The subjects of these paintings are St Christopher, the Tree of the Seven Deadly Sins, and the Three Dead and the Three Living. These paintings were discovered in 1870, when the lime wash was removed from the south wall. Cranborne's painting of the Tree of Seven Deadly Sins is believed to be unique.

A larger and more ornate wall painting exists on the wall above the chancel arch, dating from the rebuilding of the chancel in 1874, depicting Christ and the twelve Apostles. The chancel itself is a Gothic Revival construction, separated from the nave by a thin wooden screen and designed by David Brandon, featuring a wagon roof.

==== Stained glass ====
The church does not retain much medieval glass: much of the glazing is either Victorian or modern clear glass. The windows of the north nave aisle feature mostly Victorian stained glass from 1885, depicting Bartholomew, Jesus, Paul and Peter. Much of the south nave aisle glass is also Victorian, one of the windows being dedicated to John Tregonwell of nearby Cranborne Lodge, who died in 1885.One window in the same aisle has fragments of pre-Reformation glass, accompanied by modern clear glass.

Other windows of note are the 1992 east window by Alan Younger, consisting of five lancets and a mixture of clear and stained glass; and the 5-light west window in the tower, dating from 1885 by Cox & Buckley, depicting Dunstan.

==== Monuments and fittings ====
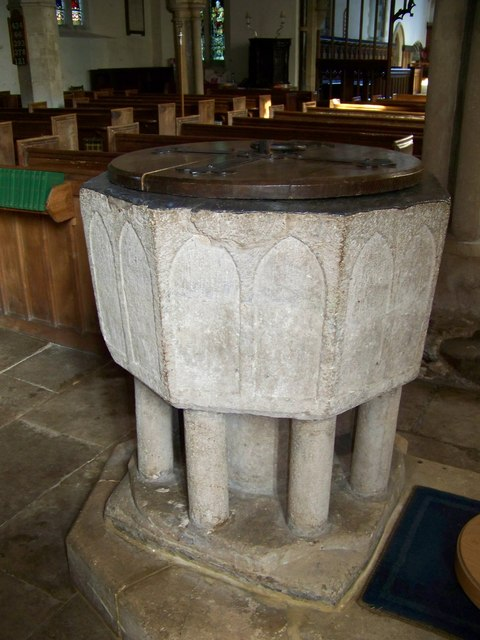
The 12th-century Purbeck font

There are numerous monuments in the church, many dating to the 16th, 17th and 18th centuries. These include memorials to John Elliott, the Hooper family, Katherine Wyndham (third wife of Hugh Wyndham), Edmund Uvedale, John Hawles, William Miles and Edward Stillingfleet, Bishop of Worcester who was born in Cranborne. A monument in the church lists every abbot and prior of Cranborne from 1100 to the dissolution, and a list of churchwardens from 1645 to the present day. There is additionally a tomb recess in the north chancel wall that may have been an Easter Sepulchre. There are several funeral hatchments in the church, notably two in the tower, and a Jacobean tomb in the south nave aisle.

There is an ancient font in the south aisle, dating from the early 13th century, carved from Purbeck stone and featuring an octagonal bowl. Originally sited in the central nave, it was moved to the tower in 1854 and finally to the south aisle in 1970. The font originally had a wooden cover depicting a church steeple, which still survives amongst the monuments in the north nave aisle.

A highly intricate and detailed pulpit can be found under the north-eastern portion of the chancel arch, which is of much interest to historians. The pulpit, made of oak on a circular stone base, bears the monogram of Thomas Parker, and dates from c. 1440. Parker was abbot of Tewkesbury from 1381 to 1421. The pulpit contains numerous carvings, many of which relate to the surrounding Cranborne Chase.

The church has a moderate sized organ, comprising two manuals built by the Wadsworth brothers of Salford in 1880 at a cost of £481. The organ is listed by the British Institute of Organ Studies under the Historic Organs scheme. The organ was restored in 1991.

== Bells ==
The first record of bells at Cranborne was in an inventory in 1552, where four bells are recorded. Some of these bells were recast several times in the following centuries, firstly by John Wallis of Salisbury in 1608 and 1610, then again by Clement Toiser in 1713.

Thomas Mears II of the Whitechapel Bell Foundry remodelled these bells into a ring of six in 1841 by melting down the 16 long cwt (813 kg) tenor and using the metal to cast two new trebles, recasting the third and fourth at the same time. Following the 1841 remodelling, only one bell remained from those recorded in 1552, the third, cast by the Salisbury Foundry in c. 1525. The other bell not recast by Mears was the bell recast by Toiser in 1713, which became the tenor of the ring of six from 1841 onwards. Mears also rehung all six bells with new fittings in the existing timber frame, and provided a new ringing chamber floor, the bells likely being rung from the ground floor before this date. The total cost of this work was £224 11s 6d. The Toiser bell was weighed at this time and found to be 13 long cwt 3 qr 24 lb (709 kg or 1,564 lb).

By the late 19th century, the frame was in dangerous condition, and ringing was suspended for fear of damage to the tower. A meeting of the parish council was called in 1889, and it was decided that the frame and belfry floor should be replaced, and if enough money could be raised, the bells augmented to eight with two new trebles, given the ample space in the tower. John Warner & Sons of Cripplegate, London, won the contract, and work commenced in 1890. The bells were all rehung by Warners in the new frame, with new fittings including wooden headstocks and plain bearings. The new frame was designed for eight bells and manufactured of timber. The first full peal on the bells and in the tower was on 6 June 1892, comprising 5040 changes of Grandsire Triples in 3 hours and 1 minute, rung by the Winchester Diocesan Guild of Ringers.

In the very late 19th century, John Taylor & Co of Loughborough mastered the art of true harmonic tuning, a technique thought to be lost. As such, by 1948, it was realised that Cranborne's bells, cast before this technique was mastered, were tonally poor, so a scheme was launched to replace the mixed ring of eight with a new and heavier eight which would be more in tune with each other. The contract was awarded to John Taylor & Co in 1950, who removed the old bells from the tower in the final months of 1950. The fifth bell of the ring of eight was the 1525 bell mentioned in the inventory in 1552, and it was poorly toned, but considered too historic to recast, and was therefore spared. The other seven bells were recast, together with a new bell to replace the aforementioned 1525 bell, on 18 January 1951 at Taylor's premises in Freehold Street, Loughborough.

All eight bells had new fittings provided, including cast iron headstocks, ball bearings and wrought-iron clappers. The 1525 bell was retired and kept as a service bell; a new frame extension was made by Taylor's to hang the bell for chiming alongside the newly-recast change ringing bells. The tower thus contains nine bells, eight modern change ringing bells from 1951, and a service bell from 1525. The service bell retains the fittings Warners gave it in 1890, and can now only be sounded by means of an external hammer. The new tenor bell was heavier than the Toiser bell from 1713, weighing 17 long cwt and 21 lbs (873 kg or 1,925 lb), sounding the note of F major. The new ring of eight were dedicated on 17 March 1951 by Lancelot Addison, Archdeacon of Dorset. The total cost of the project was £1,526.

== Gallery ==
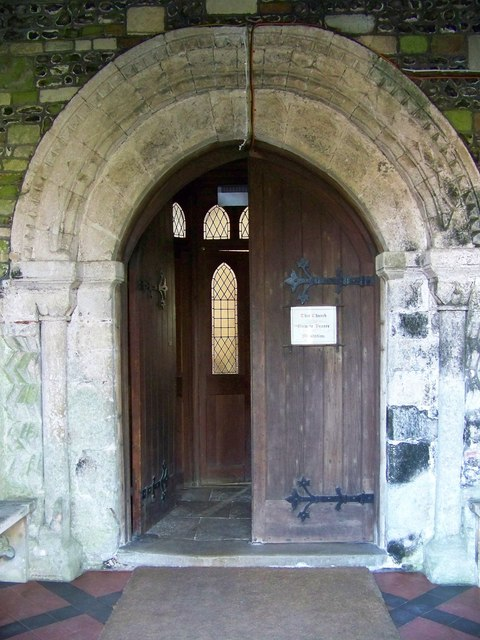
The oldest part of the present building, the c.1120 Norman doorway in the north porch

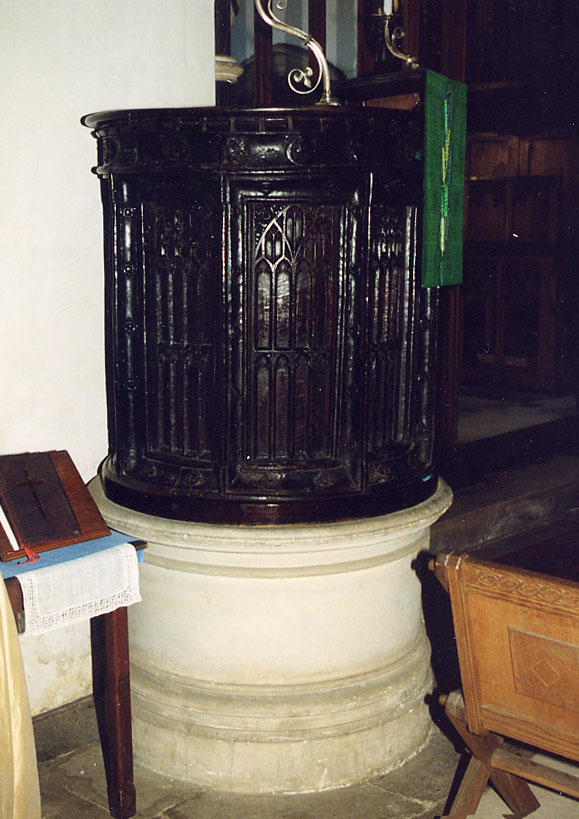
Medieval pulpit (c.1440)

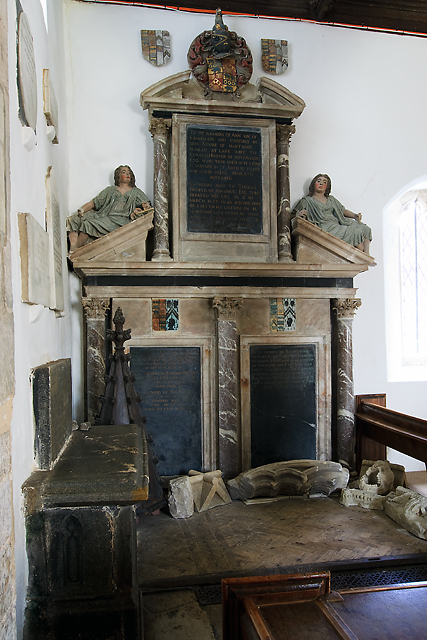
Hooper family monument

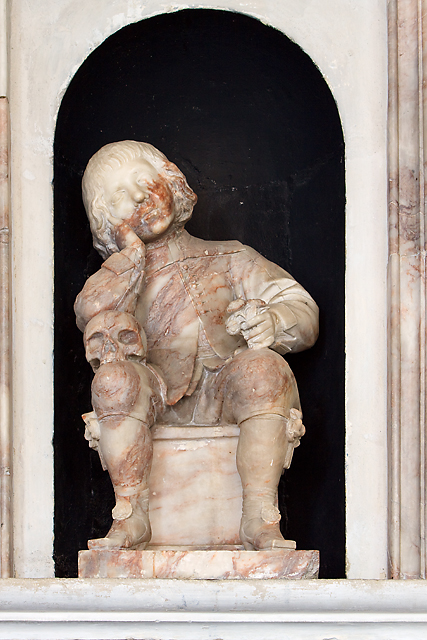
Monument to John Elliott

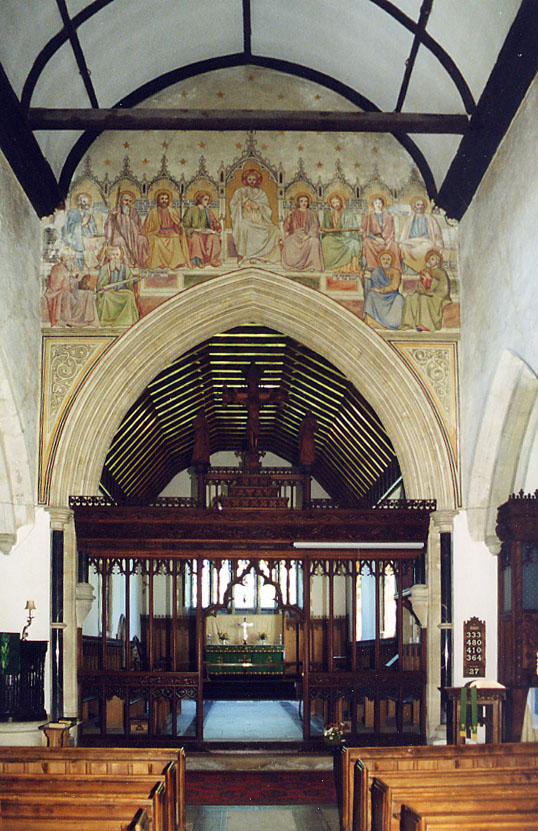
Chancel arch and painting of the twelve apostles

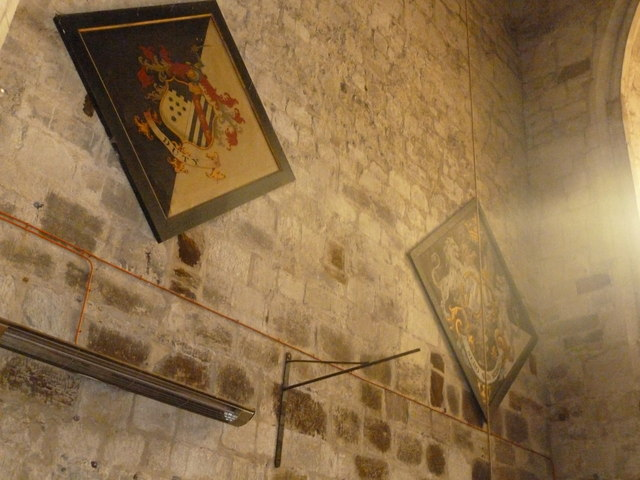
Funeral hatchments in the tower

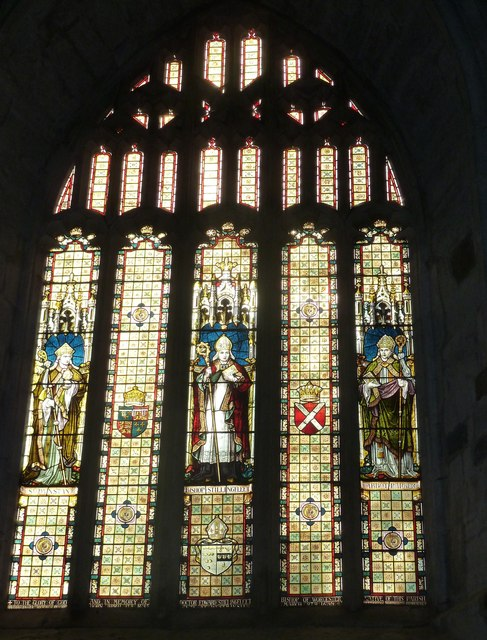
West window (1885)

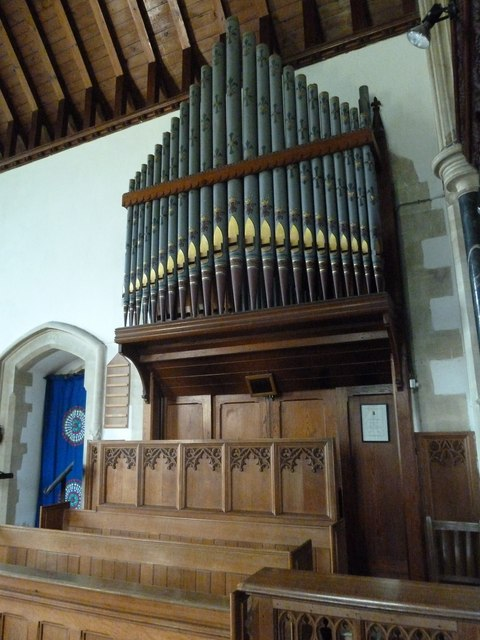
Organ

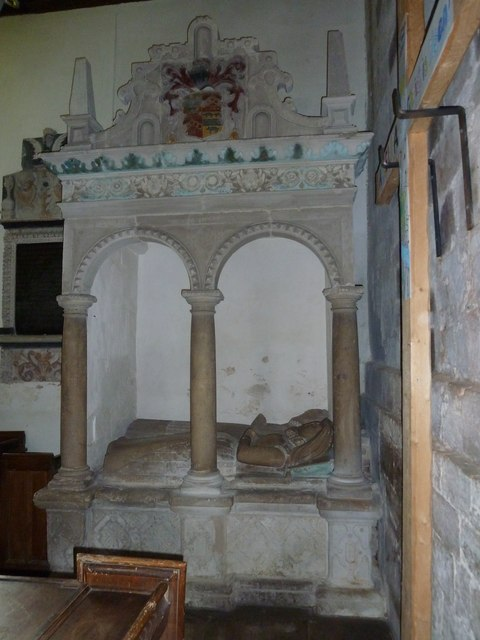
Jacobean tomb, south aisle

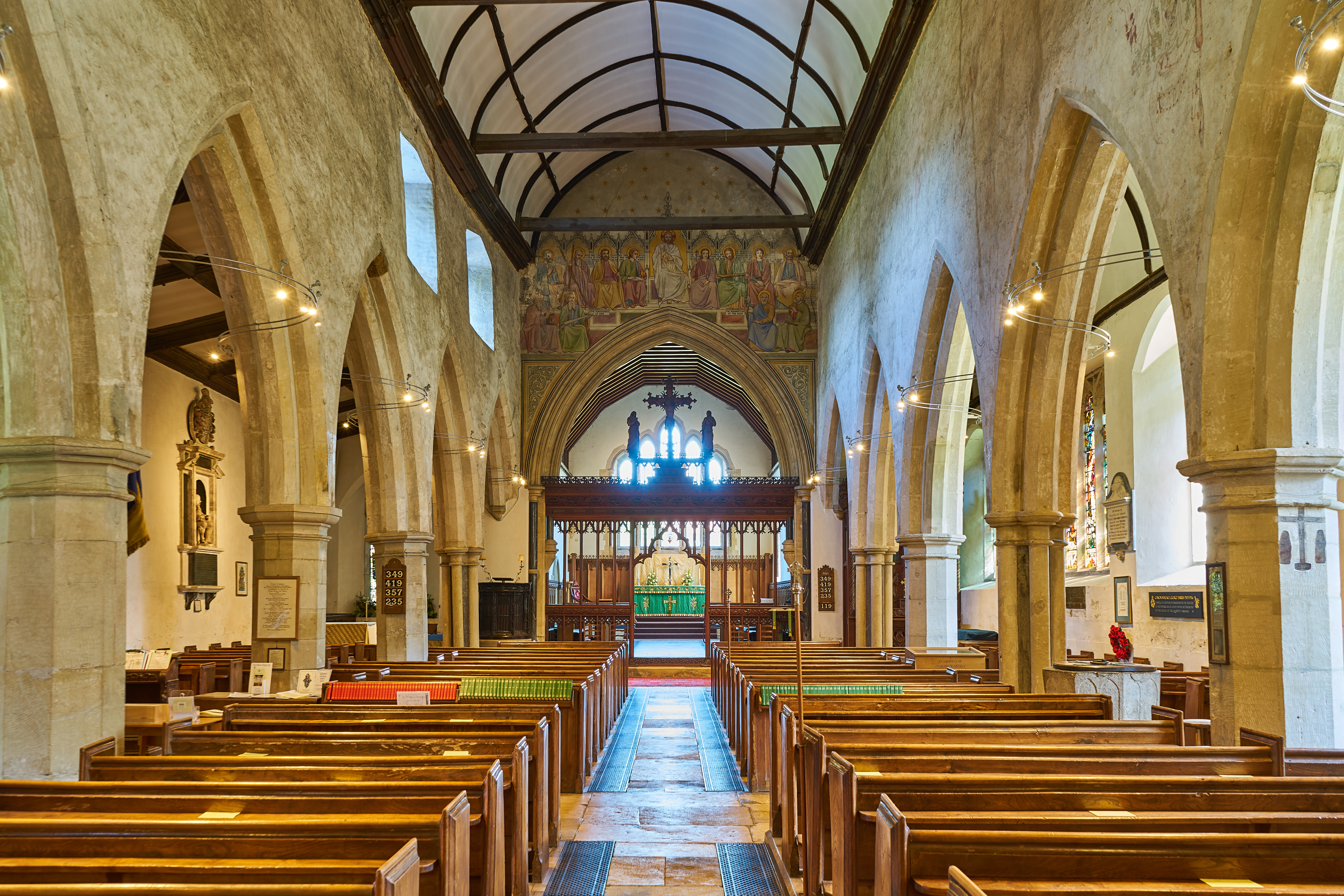
Nave, looking east
