= Gussage =

Group of villages in Dorset, England

Coordinates: 50°54′N 2°01′W

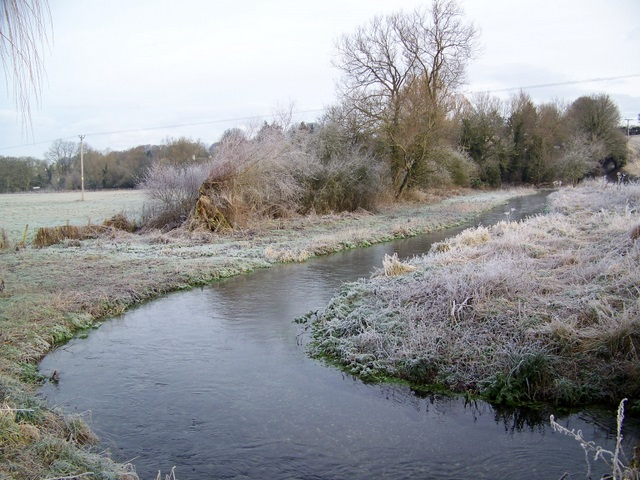
The winterbourne stream linking the three villages

Gussage is a series of three villages in north Dorset, England, situated along the Gussage Stream, a tributary of the River Allen on Cranborne Chase, 8 mi (13 km) north east of Blandford Forum and 10 mi (16 km) north of Wimborne. The stream runs through all three parishes: Gussage All Saints, population 192, Gussage St Michael, pop. 219 (in 2001) and Gussage St Andrew, population unknown, but smaller than the other two villages.

The earthworks on Gussage Down, to the east of the villages, including a large settlement enclosure with two banjo enclosures, three bowl barrows and parts of linear boundaries, a prehistoric field system and a cursus on Gussage Hill. Together they form a scheduled monument.
