= Alan Younger =

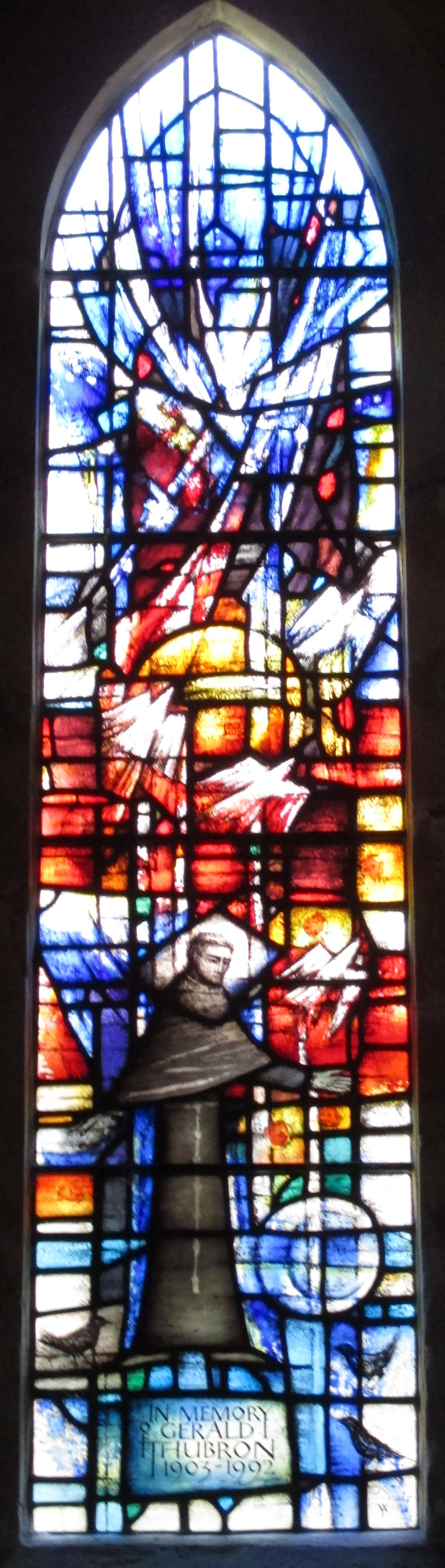
The St Francis Window in St Andrew and St Mary the Virgin Church, Fletching, East Sussex

Alan Christopher Wyrill Younger (13 March 1933, Forest Hill, London – 12 May 2004, Crystal Palace, London) was a stained-glass artist working in both figurative and abstract modes. His work can be found across Britain in cathedrals, churches and secular buildings, and also in various countries in the Middle East. He was a prominent figure in the world of stained-glass design, notably as a Fellow and vice-president of the British Society of Master Glass Painters.

== Youth ==
Alan Younger was born in 1933 in Forest Hill, London, the son of Henry Walter Younger, an employee of Sainsbury's. His third name, Wyrill, came from his mother's maiden name. He was educated at Alleyn's School, initially at its permanent home in Dulwich but later at Rossall, where it had to be evacuated during the Second World War. His National Service was spent as a second lieutenant with the Royal Army Service Corps Egypt. He left the Army in 1953.

== Career ==
Younger studied fine arts at the Central School of Arts and Crafts in London, and while still studying there he became an assistant to the stained-glass artist Carl Edwards. He continued with Edwards for six years, helping him with windows for the House of Lords and the Church of England Cathedral in Liverpool, and creating his own first window for the Temple Church in London. In 1959 he left Edwards' studio to begin a six-year stint working for Lawrence Lee, whose Coventry Cathedral windows had made a deep impression on him. From Edwards, according to Caroline Benyon, he learned how to run a glass-designing business, from Lee how to develop his talent as an artist. During these years he was awarded the Worshipful Company of Glaziers' prize and the Sir Arthur Evans Travelling Scholarship, the latter of which financed a tour of France and Germany studying their medieval and contemporary stained glass. On leaving Edwards he set up in business on his own account, securing commissions from the parish churches of Haselbech, Northamptonshire and Boldre, Hampshire in 1966 and 1967 respectively. The latter window has been called "a choice work". In these early years he was working in The Glass House, Fulham, but in 1969 he moved house to Belvedere Road, Crystal Palace, and built a studio for himself in his garden.

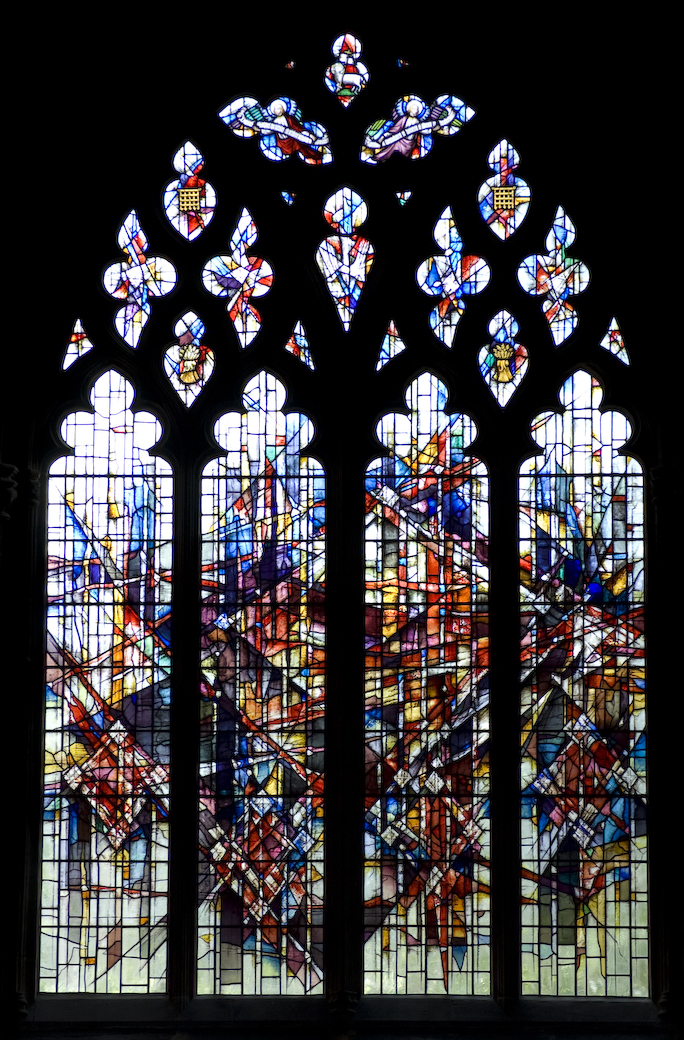
One of the Westminster windows in Chester Cathedral

In 1973 he was chosen to design a window for the Galilee Chapel of Durham Cathedral to celebrate the 1300th anniversary of the Venerable Bede's birth; in 1987 a window in St Albans Cathedral, described as "one of the very few modern rose windows which can compare with those of the early Middle Ages"; in 1992, to mark its 900th anniversary, three windows in Chester Cathedral; in 1993 another at Southwark Cathedral; in 1997–2003 another in the Royal Memorial Chapel at the Royal Military Academy Sandhurst; and in 2000 a window in the Henry VII Chapel of Westminster Abbey (2000). He also worked during the 1980s on numerous stained-glass designs for palaces, mosques and private villas in Saudi Arabia and elsewhere in the Middle East.

Younger was active in supporting the craft of stained-glass design. He was a Fellow and vice-president of the British Society of Master Glass Painters. a Brother of the Art Workers' Guild, and a trustee of the Stained Glass Museum, Ely. Between 1972 and 1984 he judged the Worshipful Company of Glaziers' Stevens Competition.

=== Other notable works ===
- St Mary's Church, Luton, Bedfordshire. The five-light Magnificat Window in the south transept (1979). Its abstract design is intended to represent Mary's "explosion of happiness" and "outpouring of gratitude". The Buildings of England notes its "outstanding quality".
- The Stained Glass Museum, Ely, Cambridgeshire. Several stained-glass works and preparatory designs are held, though they are not necessarily on display.
- St Peter's Church, Flushing, Cornwall. Younger's 1995 window was described in The Buildings of England as "a striking and successful abstract design, the best in Cornwall".
- St Mary's and St Bartholomew's Church, Cranborne, Dorset. The five-light East Window (1992).
- St Mary Magdalene's Church, Fifehead Magdalen, Dorset. The West Window (1973) depicts the Virgin Mary, St Mary Magdalene, and St John.
- St Aldhelm's Chapel, Worth Matravers, Dorset. A design using a variety of white glasses rather than stained glass.

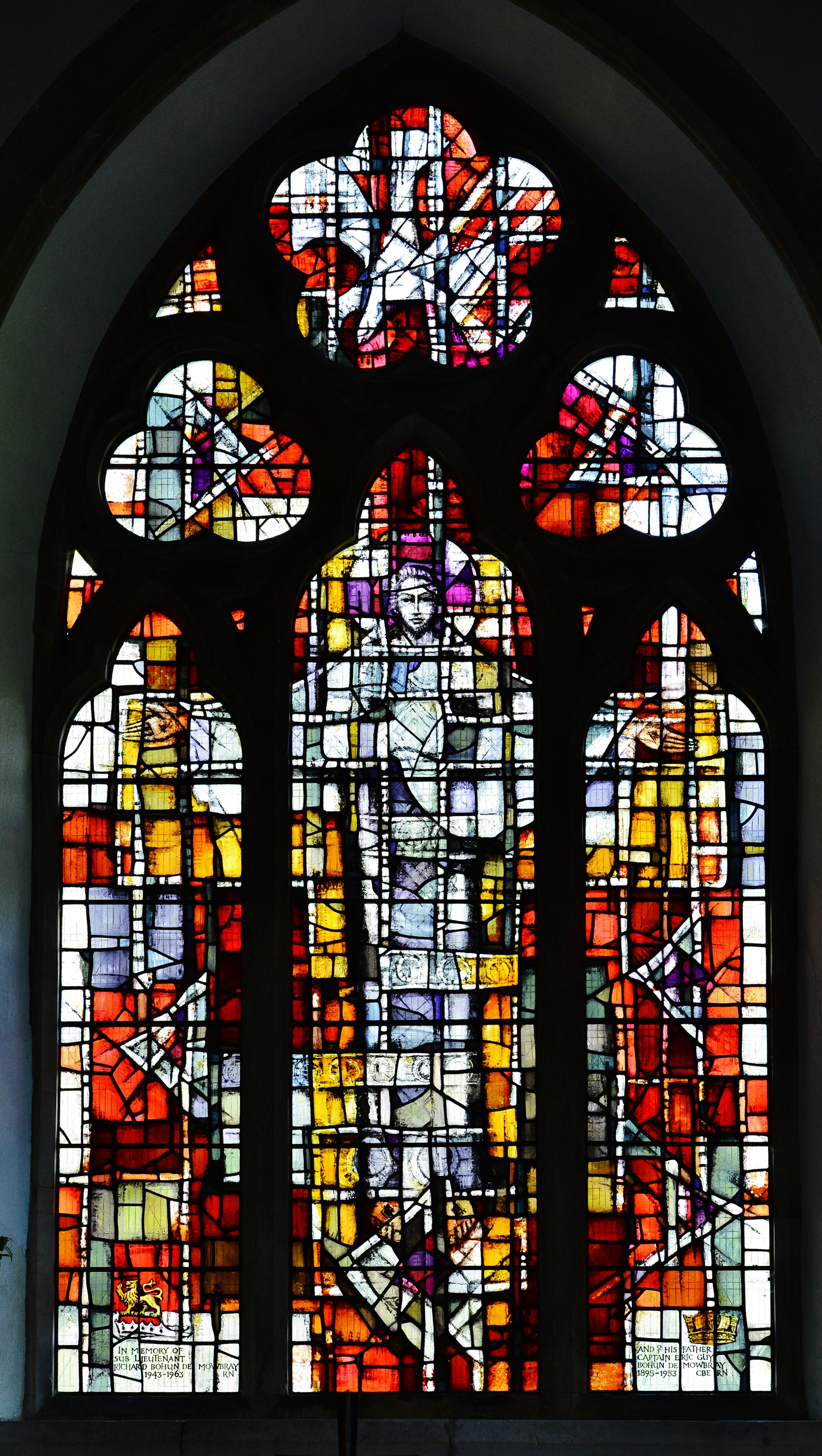
The East Window of St John the Baptist's Church, Boldre, Hampshire

- University of Glasgow Memorial Chapel, Glasgow. Two lancets in the south wall commissioned for the chapel's 50th anniversary in 1979.
- All Saints Church, East Sheen, Greater London. The West Window (1996) is a memorial to Suzy Lamplugh.
- St James the Great's Church, Friern Barnet, Greater London. The East Window (1974), an abstract.
- St Mary's Church, Putney, Greater London. The rose window at the east end of the south aisle and all six of the north aisle windows were made by Younger in 1982.
- St Paul's Church, Woodford Bridge, Greater London. The Buildings of England notes Younger's "delightful roundel in clear glass, the border with tiny animals; 1987".
- St Editha's Church, Tamworth, Staffordshire. The West Window (1975) has an abstract design intended to suggest the New Jerusalem.

== Style and technique ==
Under the tutelage of Lawrence Lee he developed a loose, spontaneous style ultimately rooted in the tradition of William Morris and the Arts and Crafts movement. He did not employ assistants except for the actual installation of the finished window, and rarely made full-size cartoons, instead using 1/12th scale designs as a starting point on which he would improvise while actually working with his materials. "Clients and friends", reported one obituary, "were fascinated to see how he would use brushes, a rag or a crumpled ball of paper to apply texture to his glass-painting." He was equally at home working in figurative, semi-abstract or fully abstract modes.

== Personal life ==
With his wife Zoe, whom he married in 1957, he had two daughters. Younger and his wife shared a love of theatre and music. He was also a keen sportsman, initially as a cricketer – he played for his school, and during his time in the army for the Middle East Combined Services – then as a tennis-player and swimmer. He was diagnosed with cancer in early 2004, and died on 12 May of that year.
