= Alan of Tewkesbury =

Abbot of Tewkesbury

Alan, Abbot of Tewkesbury (date of birth unknown) is said by Gervase of Canterbury (contemporary chronicler) to be of English (i.e. non-Norman) descent. He probably spent some time at Benevento (Italy). Became a monk at Canterbury, rising to prior in 1179. In the struggle between Thomas of Canterbury and Henry II, he was a strong supporter of Thomas. As a result, he went to Tewkesbury as abbot where he was out of Henry's way.

His works are written about in Life of St. Thomas printed (as Life of Becket) in the second volume of Materials for the History of Thomas Becket, edited by James Craigie Robertson (Rolls Series, London; 1875–85; Part I, CXC, 1475–88).

He also collected and arranged a number of Thomas' epistles.
