= Monkton Up Wimborne Hundred =

Historical division of Dorset, England

Coordinates: 50.9186°N 1.9223°W

Monkton Up Wimborne Hundred or Up Wimborne Hundred was a hundred in the county of Dorset, England, containing the parishes of Chettle, part of Cranborne, and Tarrant Monkton.

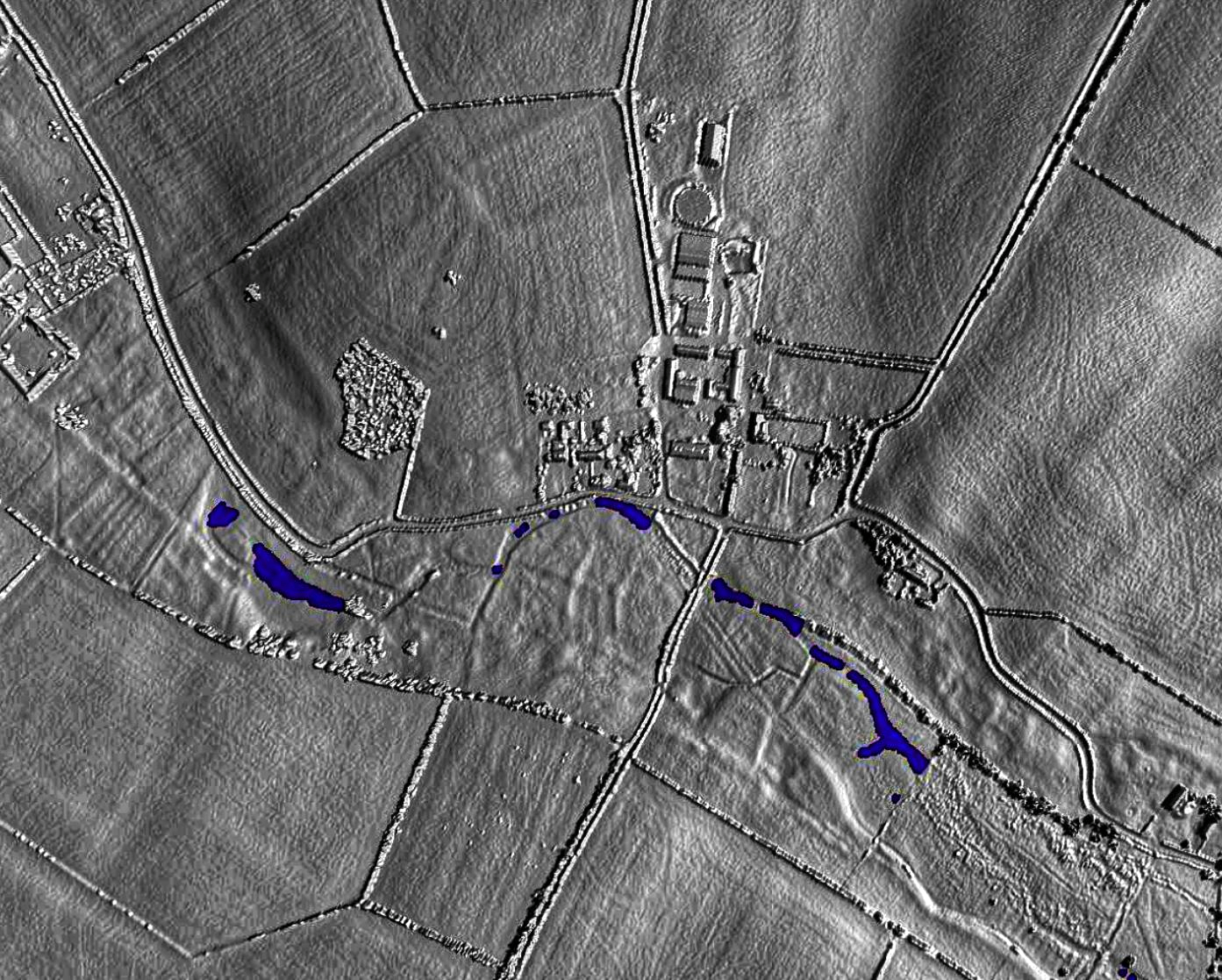
A lidar view of the village of Monkton Up Wimborne.

The name Monkton Up Wimborne is applied on modern maps to a rural area north-west of Wimborne St Giles.

== See also ==
- List of hundreds in Dorset
