= Tewkesbury Abbey =

Parish Church of St Mary the Virgin
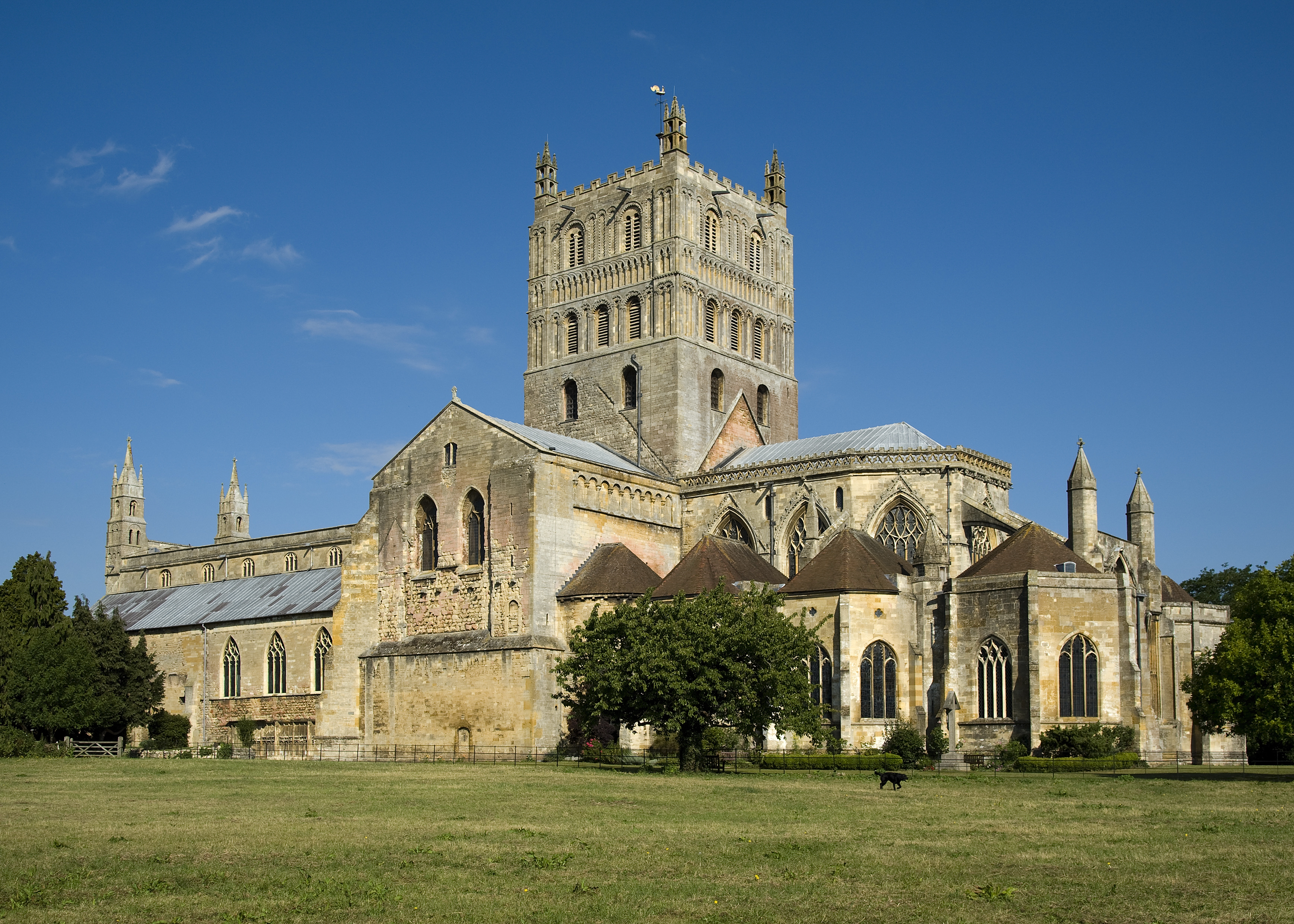
- Tewkesbury Abbey
- Parish Church of St Mary the Virgin
- 51°59′25″N 2°9′38″W
- OS grid reference: SO 89067 32445
- Country: England
- Denomination: Church of England
- Previous denomination: Roman Catholic
- Churchmanship: High church / Modern Catholic
- Website: tewkesburyabbey.org.uk

History
- Dedication: St Mary the Virgin

Administration
- Province: Canterbury
- Diocese: Gloucester
- Parish: Tewkesbury

Clergy
- Vicar: Revd Canon Nicholas Davies

The Parish Church of St Mary the Virgin, Tewkesbury, commonly known as Tewkesbury Abbey, is located in the town of Tewkesbury in the ceremonial county of Gloucestershire, England. A former Benedictine monastery, it is now a parish church. Considered one of the finest examples of Norman architecture in Britain, it has "probably the largest and finest Romanesque" crossing tower in England.

Tewkesbury had been a centre for worship since the 7th century. A priory was established there in the 10th century. The present building was started in the early 12th century. It was unsuccessfully used as a sanctuary in the Wars of the Roses. After the dissolution of the monasteries, Tewkesbury Abbey became the parish church for the town. George Gilbert Scott led the restoration of the building in the late 19th century. The church and churchyard within the abbey precincts include tombs and memorials to many of the aristocracy of the area.

Services at the Abbey have traditionally been High Church. Current Sunday services include a Parish Eucharist, a choral Mass, and Evensong. These services are accompanied by one of the church's three organs and choirs. There is a ring of twelve bells, hung for change ringing.

== History ==
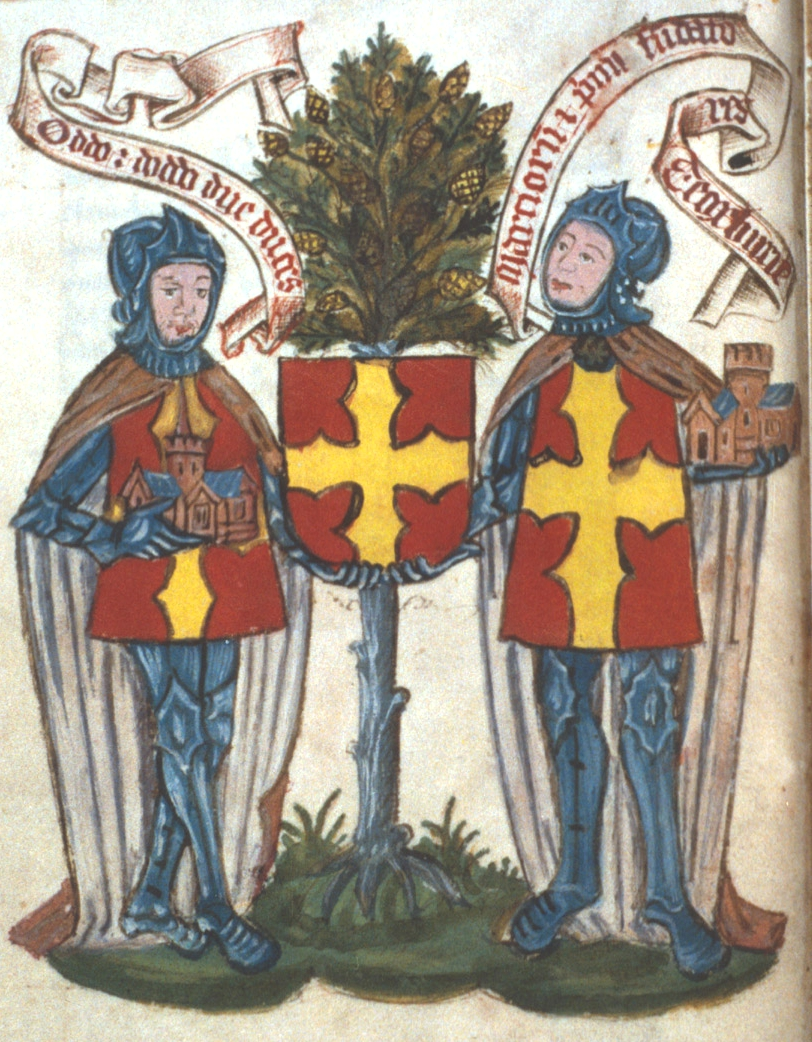
Oddo and Doddo, brothers and Dukes of Mercia, Saxon founders of Tewkesbury Abbey. Latin titulus above: Oddo : Doddo duc(es) duas Marciorum et primi fundatores Teokburie ("Oddo & Doddo two Earls of the Marches and first founders of Tewkesbury"). Each knight is in armour and bears in his hand a model of a church. Both are supporting a shield (affixed to a pomegranate tree) bearing the attributed arms of themselves and of the Abbey Gules, a cross raguly or. Tewkesbury Abbey Founders Book, folio 8 verso, Bodleian Library, Oxford

The Chronicle of Tewkesbury records that the first Christian worship was brought to the area by Theoc, a missionary from Northumbria, who built his cell in the mid-7th century near a gravel spit where the Severn and Avon rivers join. The cell was succeeded by a monastery in 715, but nothing remaining of it has been identified.

In the 10th century the religious foundation at Tewkesbury became a priory subordinate to the Benedictine Cranborne Abbey in Dorset. In 1087, William the Conqueror gave the manor of Tewkesbury to his cousin, Robert Fitzhamon, who, with Giraldus, Abbot of Cranborne, founded the present abbey in 1092. Building of the present abbey church did not start until 1102, employing Caen stone imported from Normandy and floated up the Severn.

Robert Fitzhamon was wounded at Falaise in Normandy in 1105 and died two years later, but his son-in-law, Robert FitzRoy, the natural son of Henry I who was made Earl of Gloucester, continued to fund the building work. The abbey's greatest single later patron was Lady Eleanor le Despenser, last of the De Clare heirs of FitzRoy. In the High Middle Ages, Tewkesbury became one of the richest abbeys of England.

After the Battle of Tewkesbury in the Wars of the Roses on 4 May 1471, some of the defeated Lancastrians sought sanctuary in the abbey. The victorious Yorkists, led by King Edward IV, forced their way into the abbey; the resulting bloodshed caused the building to be closed for a month until it could be purified and re-consecrated.

At the dissolution of the monasteries, the last abbot, John Wakeman, surrendered the abbey to the commissioners of King Henry VIII on 9 January 1539. As a former monk of an endowed community, he received an annuity. This was the relatively large sum of 400 marks, but would have ceased when he was ordained as the first Bishop of Gloucester in September 1541. Meanwhile, the people of Tewkesbury saved the abbey from destruction. Insisting that it was their parish church which they had the right to keep, they bought it from the Crown for the value of its bells and lead roof which would have been salvaged and melted down, leaving the structure a roofless ruin. The price came to £453.

The bells merited their own free-standing belltower, an unusual feature in English sites. After the dissolution, the bell-tower was used as the gaol for the borough until it was demolished in the late 18th century.

The central stone tower was originally topped with a wooden spire, which collapsed in 1559 and was never rebuilt. Restoration undertaken in the late 19th century under Sir George Gilbert Scott was reopened on 23 September 1879. Work continued under the direction of his son John Oldrid Scott until 1910 and included the rood screen of 1892.

Flood waters from the nearby River Severn reached inside the abbey during severe floods in 1760, and again on 23 July 2007.

=== Construction time-line ===
- 23 October 1121 the choir consecrated
- 1150 tower and nave completed
- 1178 large fire necessitated some rebuilding
- ~1235 Chapel of St Nicholas built
- ~1300 Chapel of St. James built
- 1321–1335 choir rebuilt with radiating chantry chapels
- 1349–59 tower and nave vaults rebuilt; the lierne vaults of the nave replacing wooden roofing
- 1400–1410 cloisters rebuilt
- 1438 Chapel of Isabel (Countess of Warwick) built
- 1471 Battle of Tewkesbury; bloodshed within church so great that it is closed for purification

== The building ==
The church itself is one of the finest Norman buildings in England. Its massive crossing tower is noted in Pevsner's Buildings of England to be "probably the largest and finest Romanesque example in England". Fourteen of England's cathedrals are of smaller dimensions, while only Westminster Abbey contains more medieval church monuments.

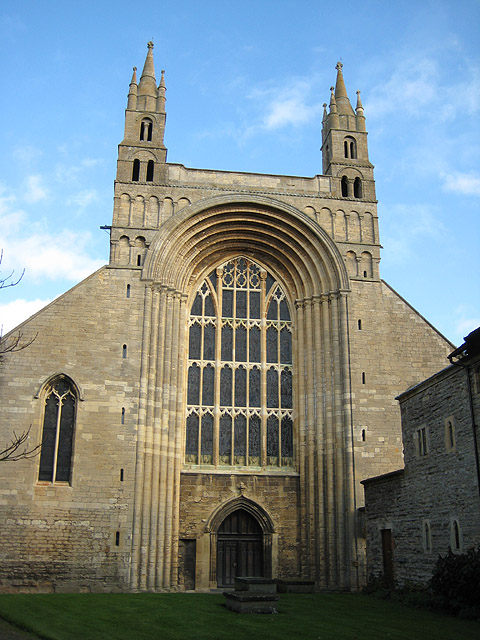
The tall Norman arch of the facade is unique in England

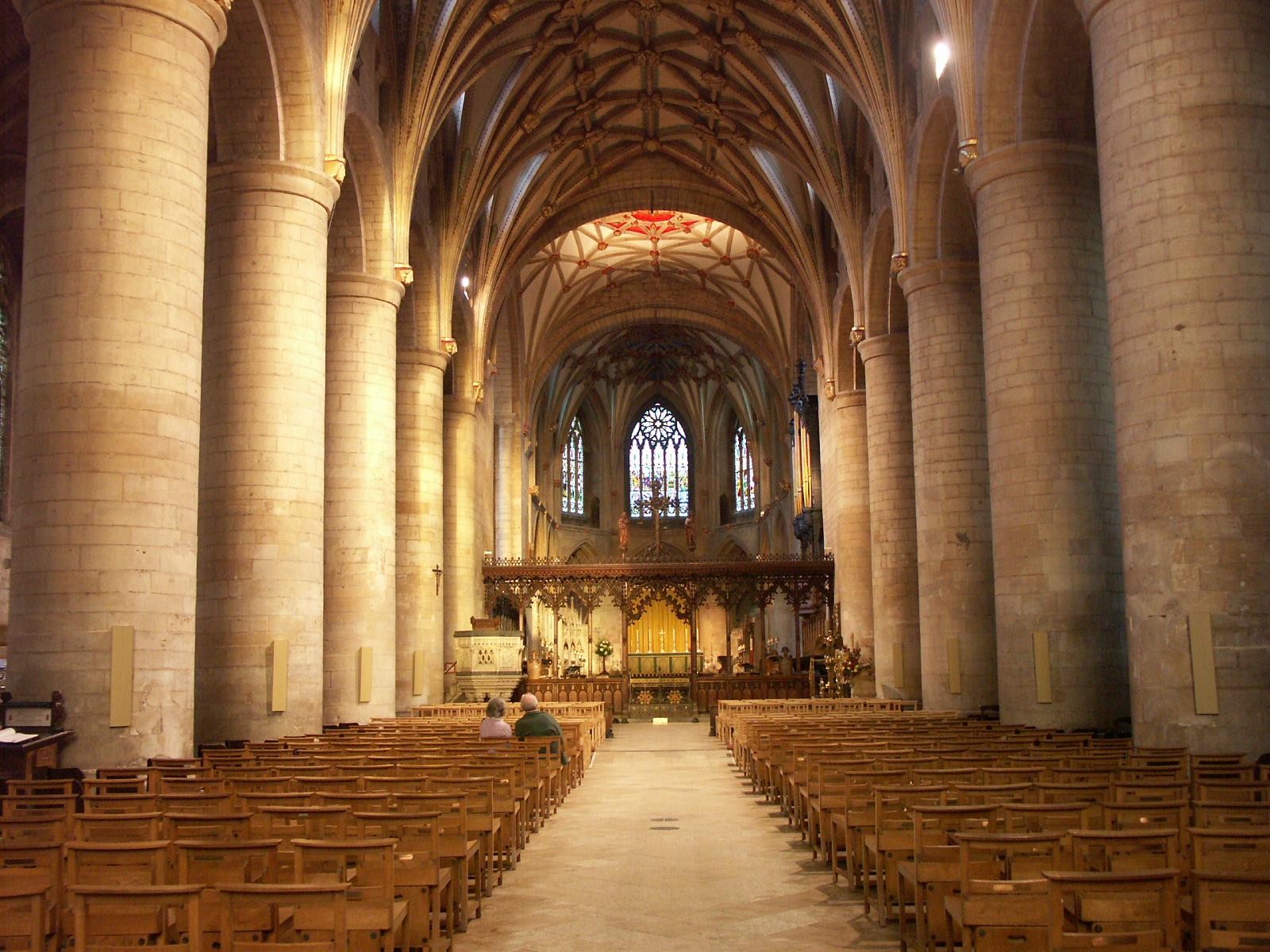
The nave of Tewkesbury Abbey

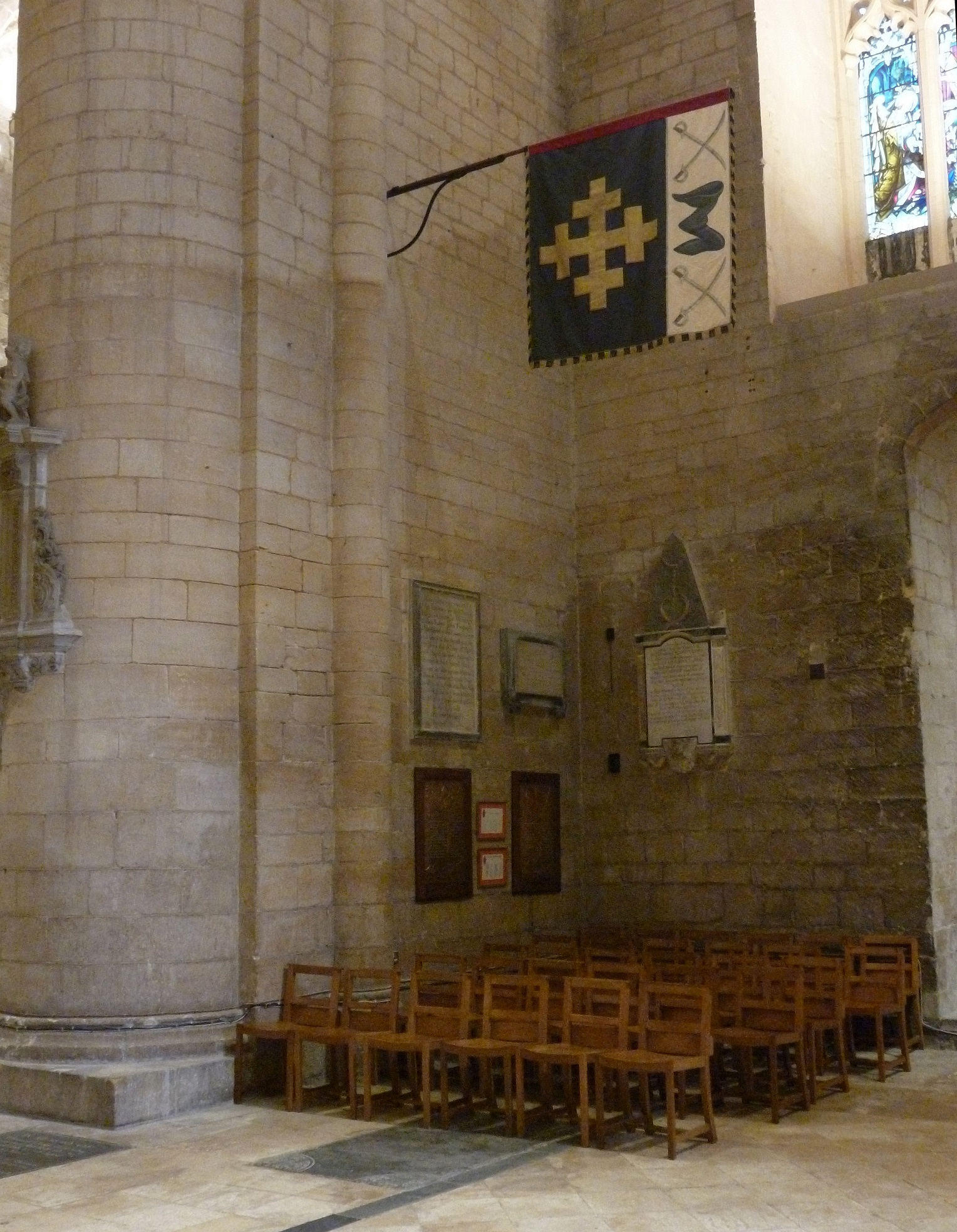
Garter banner of the late Hastings Ismay, 1st Baron Ismay in Tewkesbury Abbey

=== Stained glass ===
Tewkesbury Abbey's collection of stained glass spans from medieval to modern. In the choir clerestory are seven 14th-century windows dating from c.1338 - 1340. Proceeding clockwise from the north, the windows depict 1) Robert Fitzroy, Gilbert de Clare, Hugh Despenser the Younger and Robert Fitzhamon; 2) King David and four prophets; 3) King Solomon and four prophets; 4) The Last Judgement; 5) King Rehoboam and four prophets; 6) King Abijah and four prophets; and 7) William de la Zouche and three de Clare earls. Though the names of individuals involved in their manufacture are not recorded, stylistic analysis has linked these windows to a workshop operating in late 1330s to the 1350s across the West Midlands and West Country. The same workshop is thought to have produced glass for the cathedrals in Gloucester and Bristol.

The Victorian glazing at Tewkesbury Abbey includes an extensive series of windows by Hardman & Co., notably the great west window, installed in 1886 and depicting scenes from the life of Christ, and five windows illustrating Christ’s miracles, installed in 1888. Further Victorian glass in the aisles includes work by Heaton, Butler and Bayne. Two modern windows by Thomas Denny, installed in 2002 in the chapel of St Catherine and St John the Baptist, commemorate the 900th anniversary of the arrival of the Benedictine community in Tewkesbury and take as their theme the Benedictine motto to 'work is to pray'.

Three of seven 14th century windows in the choir clerestory

14th Century window in choir clerestory depicting the last judgement

14th century glass in choir clerestory (detail)

Great west window by Hardman & co. (1886)

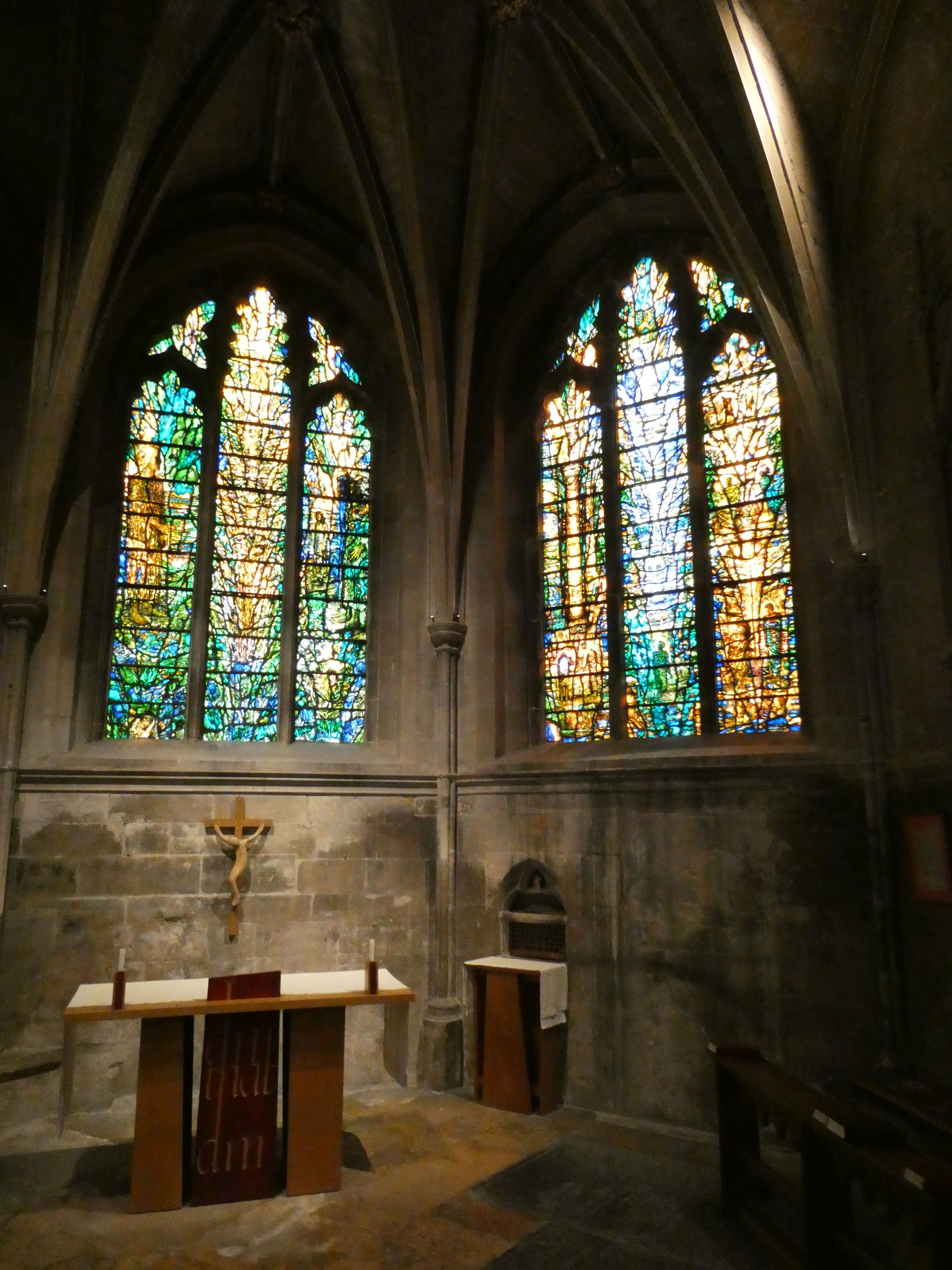
Two windows in the chapel of St Catherine and St John the Baptist by Thomas Denny (2002)

== Notable monuments ==
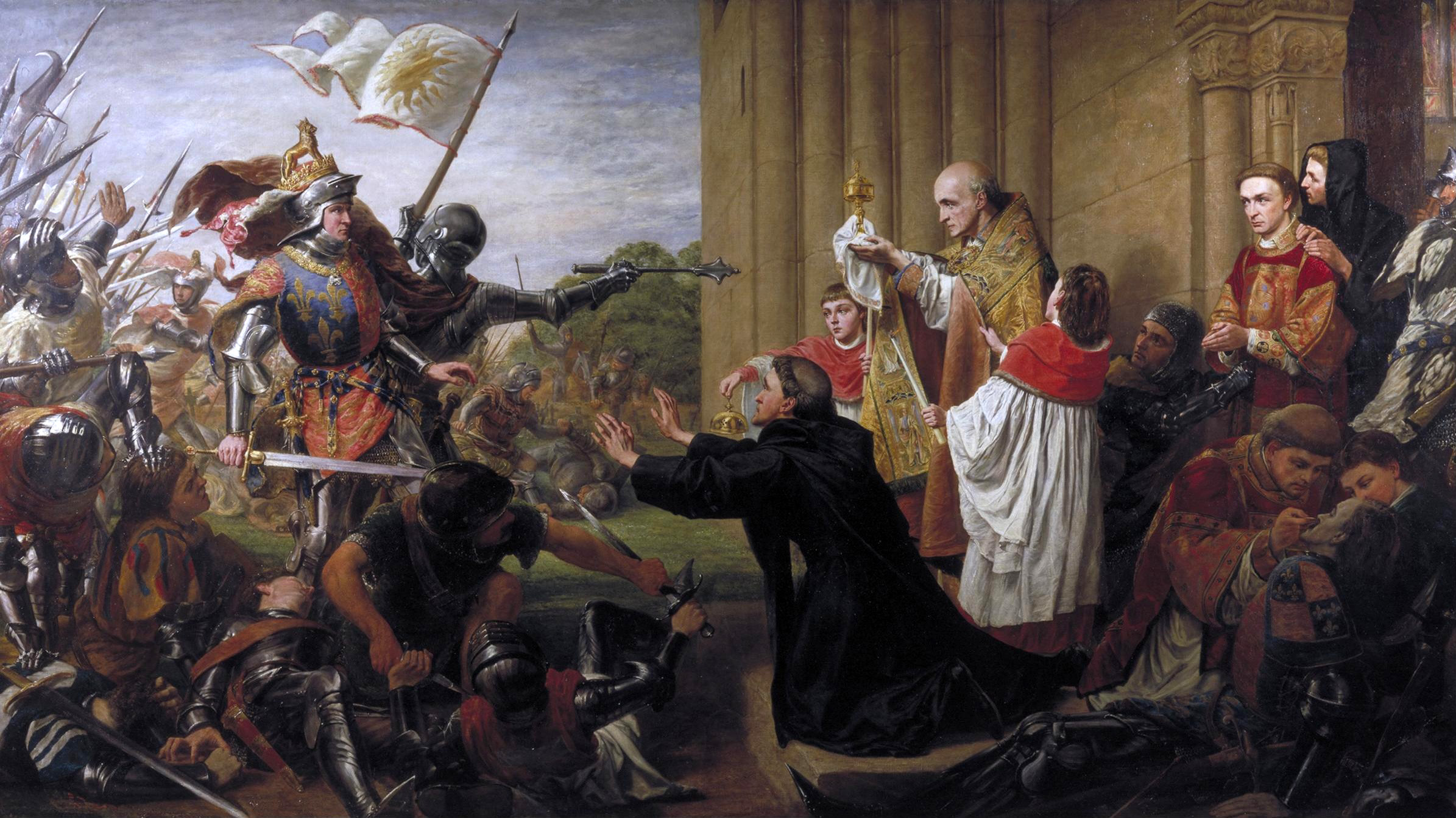
Sanctuary by Richard Burchett, 1867 depicting the aftermath of the Battle of Tewkesbury in 1471

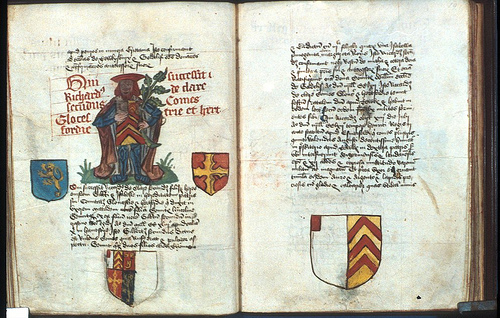
Arms of Richard de Clare, 6th Earl of Gloucester, Founders’ Book of Tewkesbury Abbey, c. 1525

Notable church monuments surviving in Tewkesbury Abbey include:

- 1107 – when the abbey's founder Robert Fitzhamon died in 1107, he was buried in the chapter house while his son-in-law Robert FitzRoy, Earl of Gloucester (an illegitimate son of King Henry I), continued building the abbey
- 1375 – Edward Despenser, Lord of the manor of Tewkesbury, is remembered today chiefly for the effigy on his monument, which shows him in full colour kneeling on top of the canopy of his chantry, facing toward the high altar
- 1395 – Robert Fitzhamon's remains were moved into a new chapel built as his tomb
- 1471 – a brass plate on the floor in the centre of the sanctuary marks the grave of Edward of Westminster, Prince of Wales, the son of King Henry VI and end of the Lancastrian line, who was killed in the Battle of Tewkesbury – the only Prince of Wales ever to die in battle. He was aged only 17 at his death.
- 1478 – the bones of George, Duke of Clarence (brother of Edward IV and Richard III), and his wife Isabel (daughter of "Warwick, the Kingmaker") are housed behind a glass window in a wall of their inaccessible burial vault behind the high altar
- 1539 – the cadaver monument which Abbot Wakeman had erected for himself is only a cenotaph because he was not buried there
- Also buried in the abbey are several members of the Despenser, de Clare and Beauchamp families, all of whom were generous benefactors of the abbey. Such members include Henry de Beauchamp, 1st Duke of Warwick, and his wife, Cecily Neville, Duchess of Warwick, sister of "Warwick, the Kingmaker".

== Other burials ==
- Brictric, a late-Saxon thegn
- John Courtenay, 15th Earl of Devon, (c. 1435 – 4 May 1471)
- Edmund Beaufort (died 1471)
- John Beaufort, Marquess of Dorset
- Richard de Clare, 3rd Earl of Hertford
- Maud (or Matilda) de Burgh (c. 1288–1320), his wife
- Isabel Marshal, her heart
- John Courtenay, 7th Earl of Devon
- Henry Beauchamp, 1st Duke of Warwick
- Guy de Bryan, 1st Baron Bryan
- Eleanor de Clare
- Thomas le Despenser, 1st Earl of Gloucester
- Gilbert de Clare, 5th Earl of Gloucester
- Richard de Clare, 6th Earl of Gloucester
- Gilbert de Clare, 7th Earl of Gloucester
- Gilbert de Clare, 8th Earl of Gloucester
- Amice FitzWilliam, 4th Countess of Gloucester (c. 1160–1220)
- Elizabeth de Burghersh, 3rd Baroness Burghersh
- Hugh le Despenser, 1st Earl of Winchester
- Hugh Despenser the Younger
- Richard de Beauchamp, 1st Earl of Worcester, (c.1394 – 18 March 1421/1422)
- Isabel le Despenser, Countess of Worcester
- Richard le Despenser, 4th Baron Burghersh
- Isabel le Despenser, Countess of Arundel
- William la Zouche, 3rd Baron Zouche (c. 1355 – 4 May 1396)
- Elizabeth le Despenser
- Hugh le Despencer, Baron le Despencer (1338)
- Elizabeth Montague (d.1359), his wife
- Samuel Jones (academy tutor)

== The three organs ==
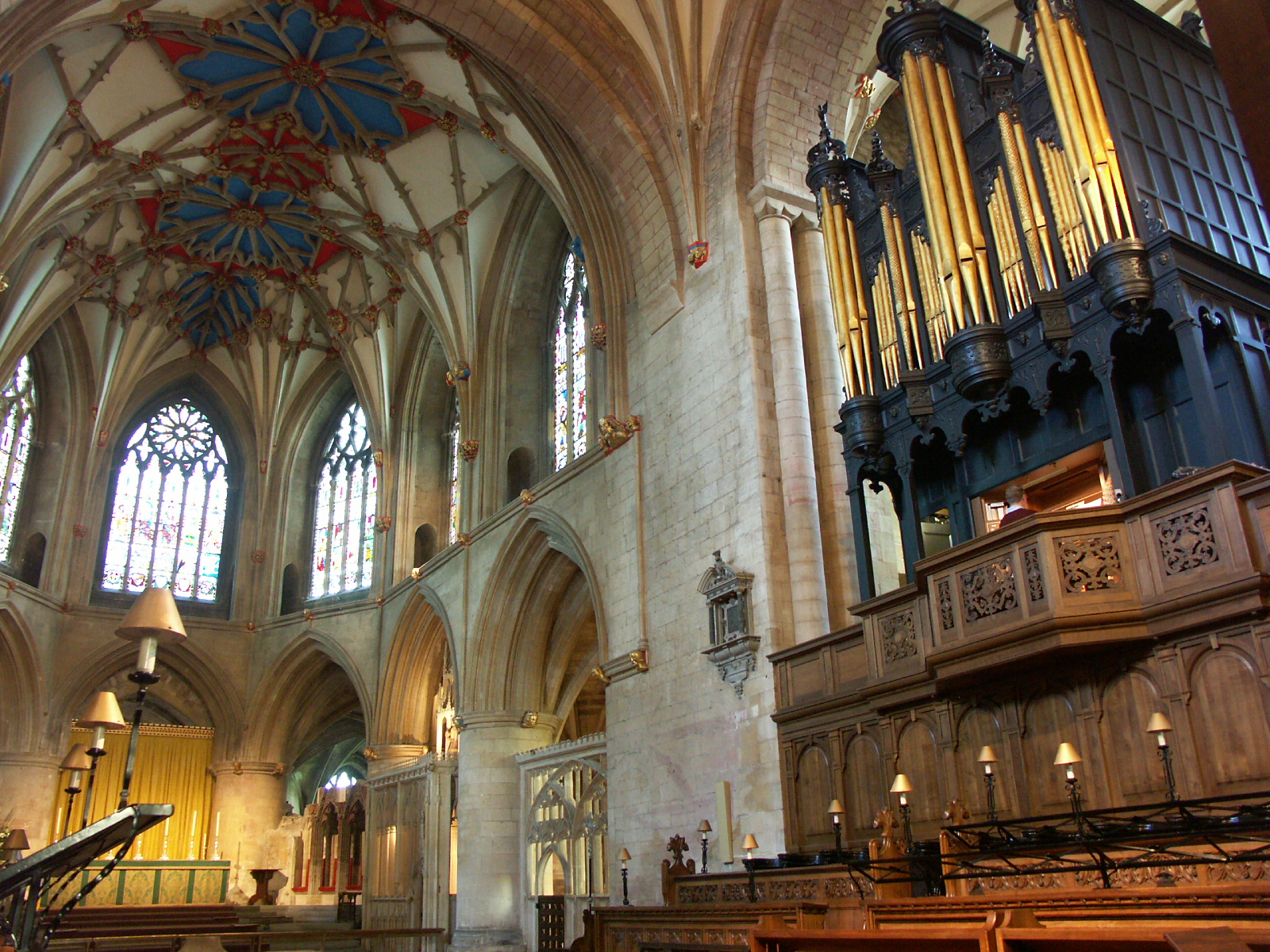
The organ and east end

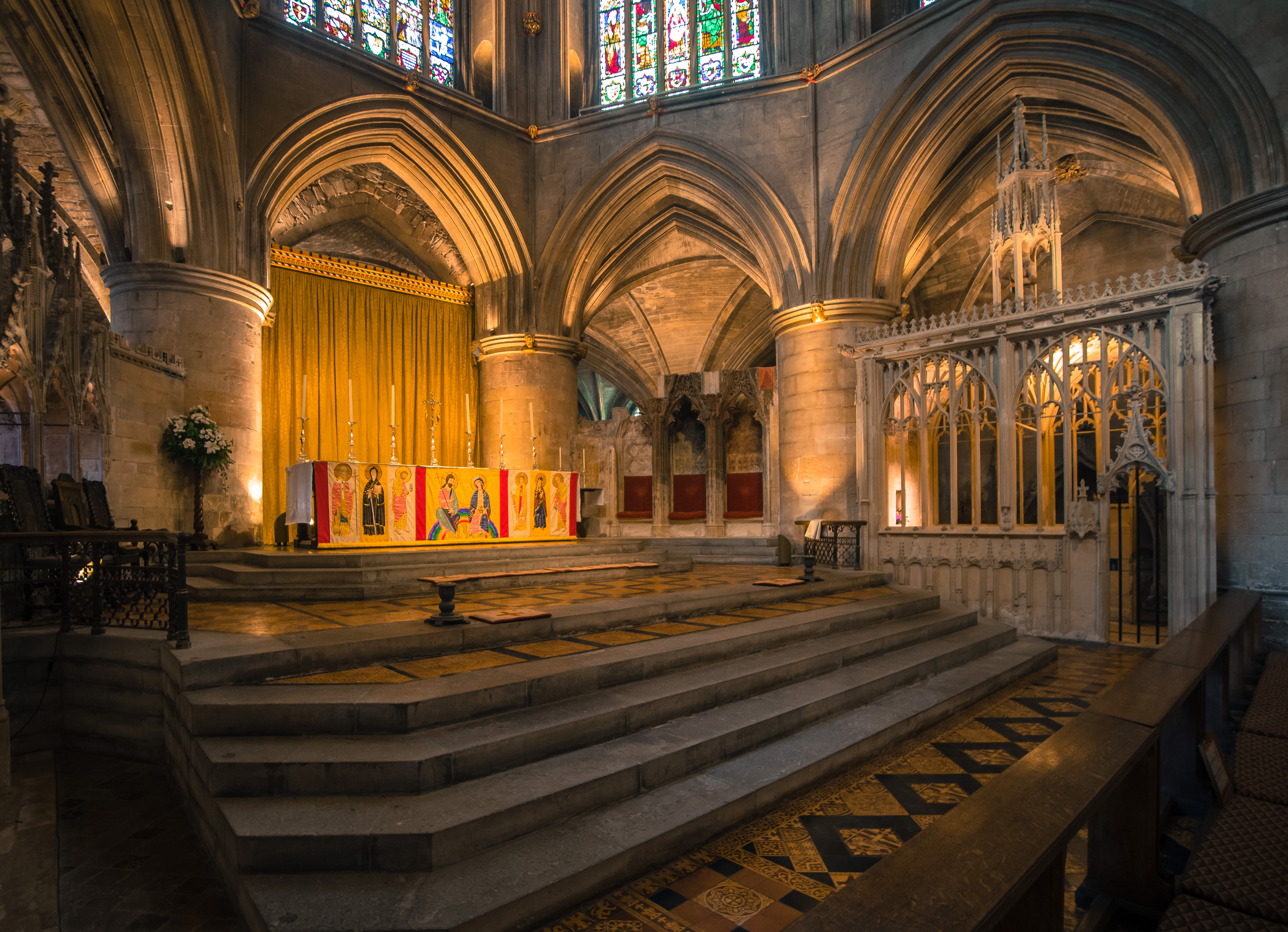
The altar

=== Milton Organ ===
The abbey's 17th-century organ – known as the Milton Organ – was originally made for Magdalen College, Oxford, by Robert Dallam. After the English Civil War it was removed to the chapel of Hampton Court Palace, where the poet Milton may have played it. It came to Tewkesbury in 1737. Since then, it has undergone several major rebuilds. A specification of the organ can be found on the National Pipe Organ Register.

=== Grove Organ ===
In the north transept is the stupendous Grove Organ, built by the short-lived partnership of Michell & Thynne in 1885: The NPOR | The National Pipe Organ Register.

=== Chamber organ ===
The third organ in the abbey is the Elliott chamber organ of 1812, mounted on a movable platform: The NPOR | The National Pipe Organ Register.

=== List of organists ===
- James Cleavely, 1737–1767
- James Edward Chandler, 1767–1798
- Nathaniel Chandler, 1798–1847
- Nathaniel Chandler White, 1847–1857
- Thomas Vale, 1857
- Jabez Jones, 1857–1858
- Mr. Caseley, 1858
- R.M. Ellis, 1858–1861
- Edward Gillman, 1861–1867
- John Thorniloe Horniblow, 1867–1878
- Henry Rogers, 1878–1880
- Daniel Hemmingway, 1881–1891
- Samuel Bath, 1891–1900
- Alfred W. V. Vine, 1900–1910
- Capt. Percy Baker, 1910–1943
  - Revd. Claude William Parnell, 1916–1918 (deputising for Percy Baker)
- Michael Stockwin Howard, 1943–1944
- Huskisson Stubington, 1944–1966
- Michael Peterson, 1966–1985
- John Belcher, 1985–1996 (formerly organist of St Asaph Cathedral)
- Carleton Etherington, 1996–present

=== List of assistant organists ===
- Leonard William Tracy Arkell 1910–1912
- Richard Abdiel Chorley 1950–1985

== The bells ==
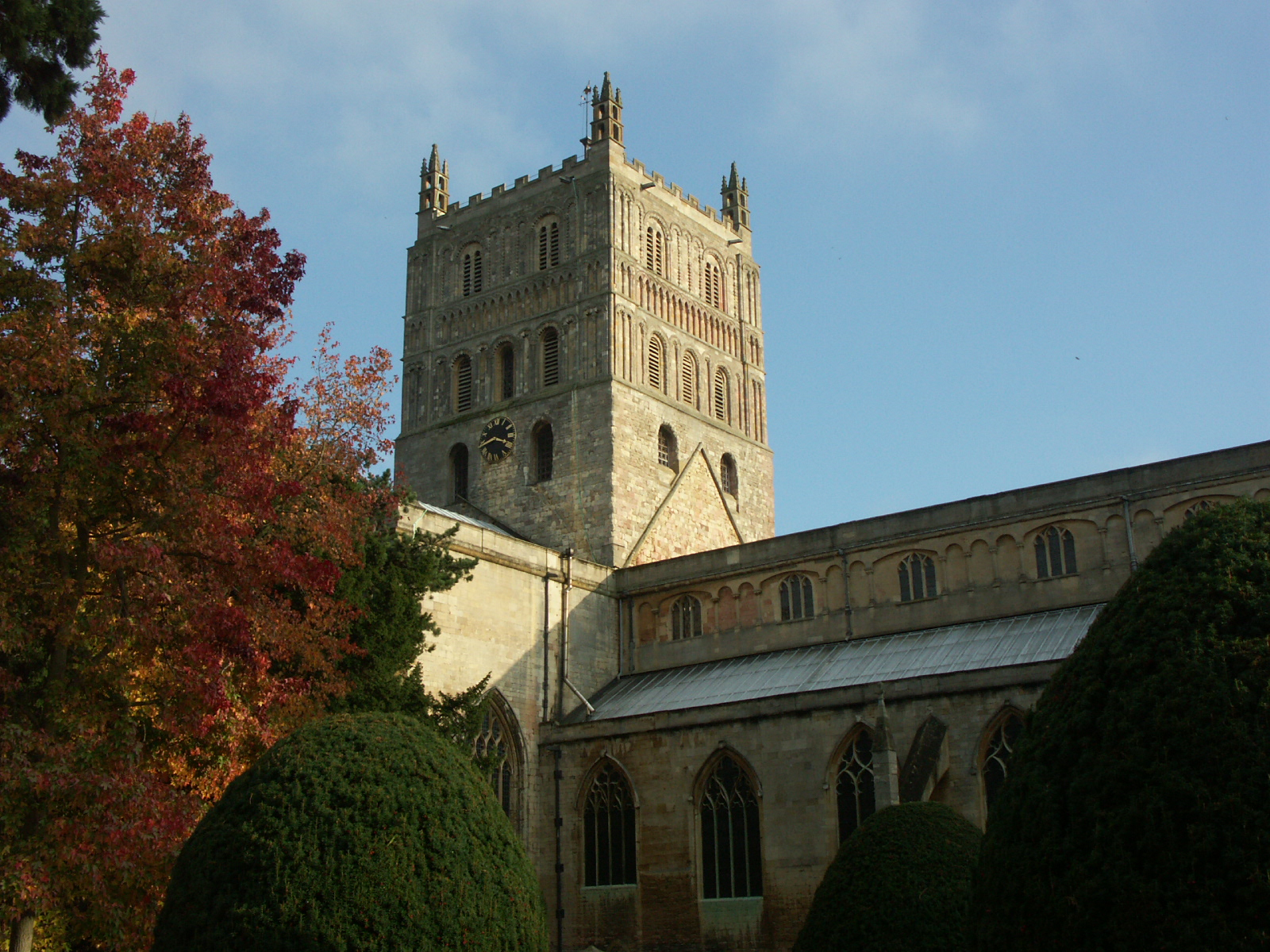
The tower is the largest Romanesque crossing tower in Europe.

The bells at the abbey were overhauled in 1962 and the ring is now made up of twelve bells, cast by John Taylor & Co of Loughborough. A semitone bell (Flat 6th) and extra treble were also cast by Taylor of Loughborough in 1991 and 2020 respectively, making a total of 14 available for change ringing.

The Old Clock Bells are the old 6th (Abraham Rudhall II, 1725), the old 7th (Abraham Rudhall I, 1696), the old 8th (Abraham Rudhall I, 1696) and the old 11th (Abraham Rudhall I, 1717).

The abbey bells are rung from 09:30am to 10:30am every Sunday. They are also rung on certain Sundays before Evensong. Practice takes place each Thursday from 7:30pm to 9:00pm.

== Churchyard ==
The churchyard contains war graves of two World War II Royal Air Force personnel.

== Abbey precincts ==
The market town of Tewkesbury developed to the north of the abbey precincts, of which vestiges remain in the layout of the streets and a few buildings: the Abbot's gatehouse, the Almonry barn, the Abbey Mill, Abbey House, the present vicarage and some half-timbered dwellings in Church Street. The abbey now sits partly isolated in lawns, like a cathedral in its cathedral close, for the area surrounding the abbey is protected from development by the Abbey Lawn Trust, a registered charity originally funded by a United States benefactor in 1962.

== Abbots ==
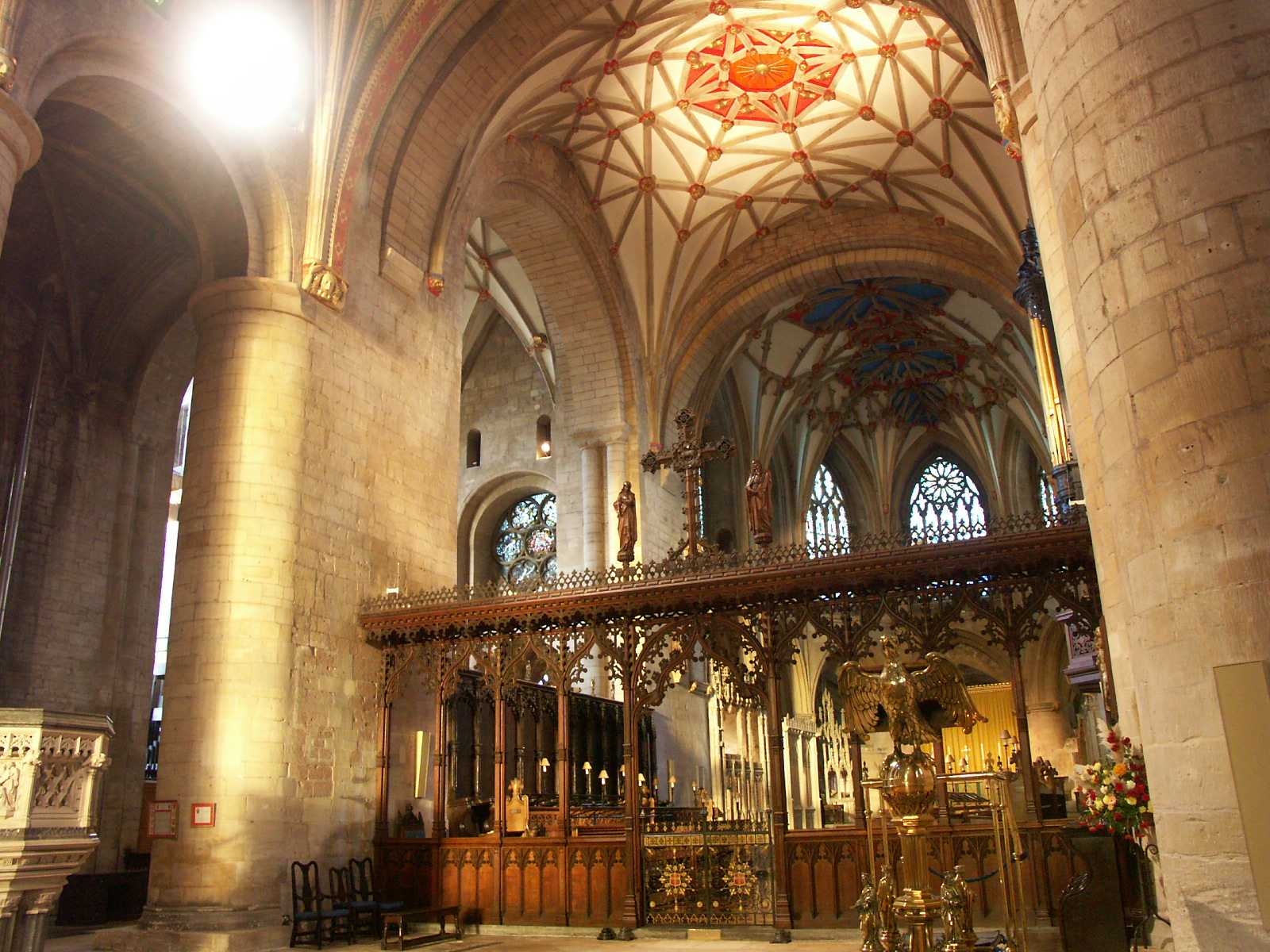
The chancel and decorated vault

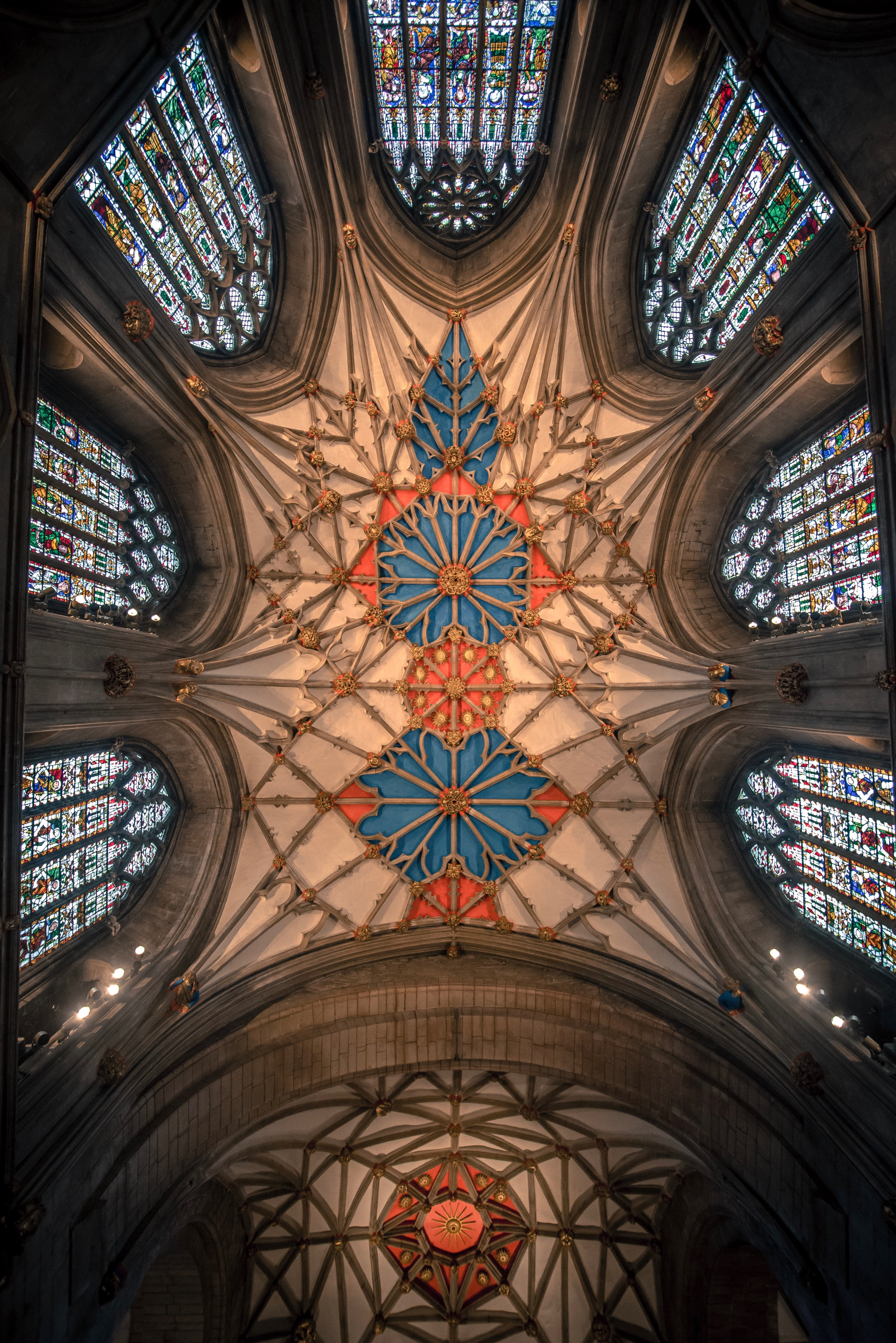
View of the decorated ceiling above the choir

- Gerald of Avranches (1102–1109). Previously served as Abbot of Cranborne, when Tewkesbury was a dependent cell. Gerald was made Abbot when the abbey was transferred to Tewkesbury by William Rufus and Robert Fitz Haimon. He also previously served as chaplain to Hugh, Earl of Chester
- Robert (1109–1123)
- Benedict (1124–1137) Previously served as Prior of Tewkesbury
- Roger (1137–1161)
- Fromund (1162–1178)
- Robert (1182–1183)
- Peter de Leia, Bishop of St Davids held the priory for three years (1183–1186)
- Alan of Tewkesbury, (1186–1202). His tomb is in the south ambulatory of the choir
- Walter (1202–1213). Previously served as the Sacrist at Tewkesbury
- Hugh or Henry (1212–1215). Previously served as Prior of Tewkesbury
- Peter of Worcester (1216–1232)
- Robert (1232–1254). Previously served as Prior of Tewkesbury. A tomb thought to be his is in the south ambulatory
- Thomas de Stoke or Stokes (1255–1276). Previously served as Prior of St James' Priory, Bristol
- Richard of Norton (1276–1282)
- Thomas of Kempsey, Kemeseye, or Kemes (1282–1328)
- John de Cotes (1330–1347). Previously served as Prior of Tewkesbury
- Thomas de Leghe (1347–1361)
- Thomas de Chesterton (1361–1389)
- Thomas Parker (1389–1420)
- William de Bristol, or de Bristow (1425–1442)
- John de Abingdon (1444–1452)
- John Galeys, Gales, or Galys (1452–1468)
- John Streynesham, or Streynsham (1468–1480)
- Richard Cheltenham, or Cheltynham (1480–1509)
- Henry Beely, Beauley, Beley, or Beoly (1509–1534)
- John Wyche alias John Wakeman (1534–1540). Last Abbot before the surrender of the monastery on 9 January 1540. Appointed Bishop of Gloucester in September 1541

== Choirs ==
The abbey possesses, in effect, two choirs. The Abbey Choir sings at Sunday services, with children (boys and girls) and adults in the morning, and adults in the evening. Tewkesbury Abbey Schola Cantorum is a professional choir of men, boys and girls based at Dean Close Preparatory School and sings at weekday Evensongs as well as occasional masses and concerts.

The abbey previously had its own school to educate and provide choristers to sing the service of Evensong. The Abbey School was founded in 1973 by Miles Amherst and closed in 2006. The choir was then re-housed at Dean Close School, Cheltenham, and renamed the Tewkesbury Abbey Schola Cantorum.

== Worship ==
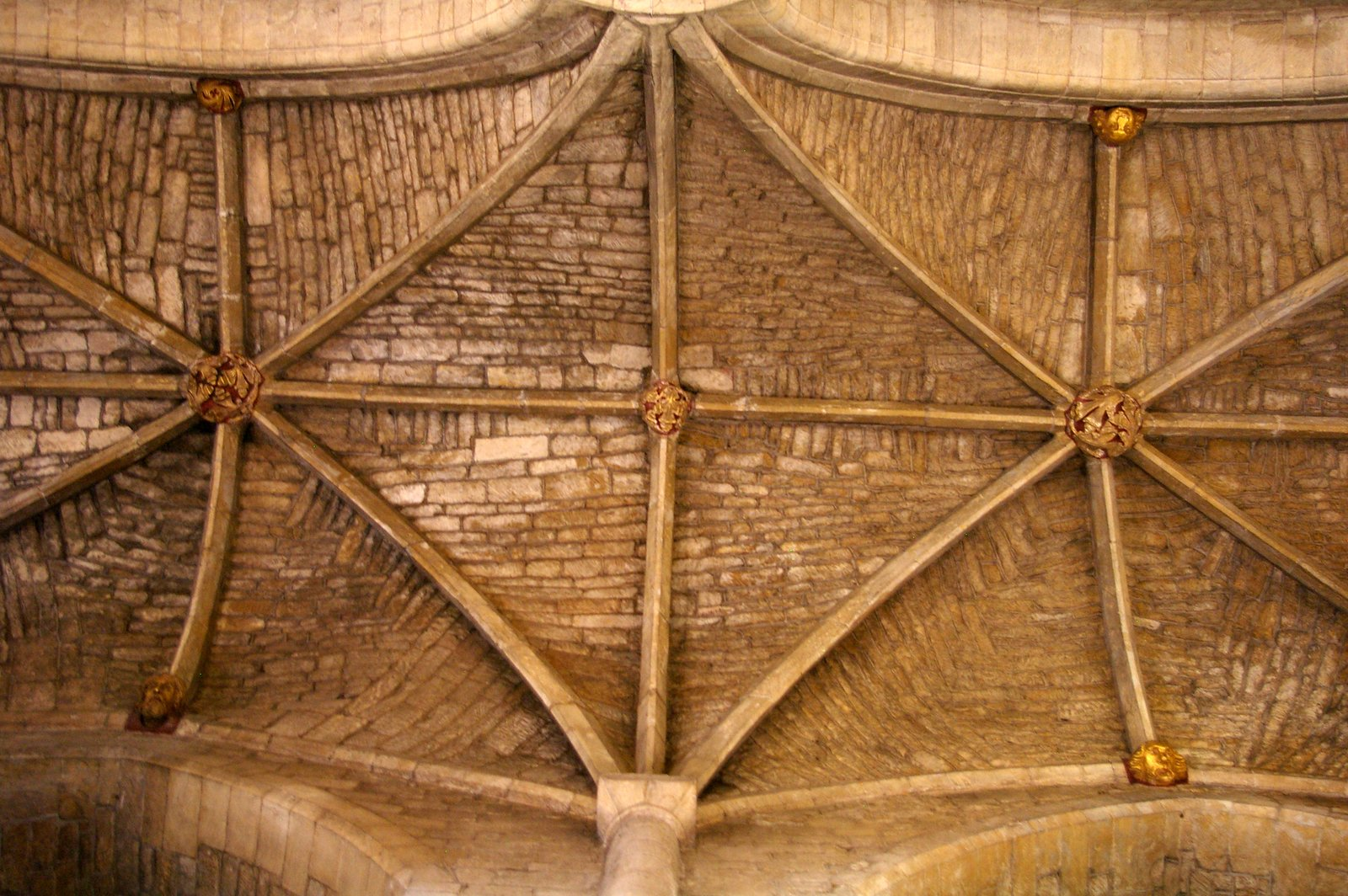
Vault detail

For the most part, worship at the abbey has been emphatically High Anglican. However, in more recent times there has been an acknowledgement of the value of less solemn worship, and this is reflected in the two congregational services offered on Sunday mornings. The first of these (at 9.15am) is a Parish Eucharist, with modern language and an informal atmosphere; a parish breakfast is typically served after this service. The main Sung Eucharist at 11am is solemn and formal, including a choral Mass; traditional language is used throughout, and most parts of the service are indeed sung, including the Collect and Gospel reading. Choral Evensong is sung on Sunday evenings, and also on Monday, Tuesday, Thursday and Friday during the week. A said Eucharist also takes place every day of the week, at varying times, and alternating between traditional and modern language. Each summer since 1969 (with the exception of 2007 when the town was hit by floods) the abbey has played host to Musica Deo Sacra, a festival combining music and liturgy. Photography in the abbey is restricted.
