= Cranborne =

Coordinates: 50°55′08″N 1°55′19″W

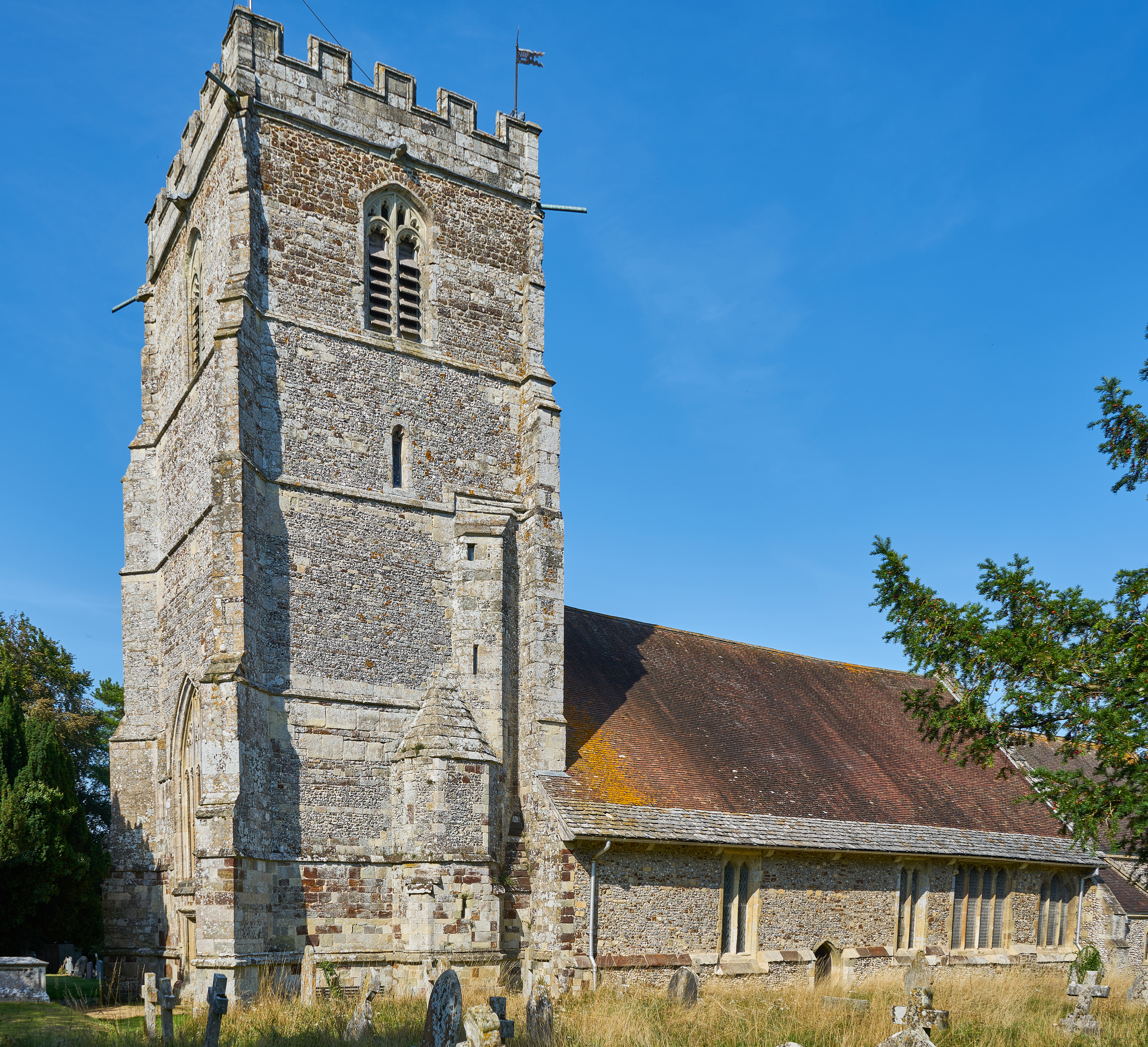
- Cranborne's 15th century parish church, formerly Cranborne Priory

- Location within Dorset
- Population: 779
- OS grid reference: SU056133
- Civil parish: Cranborne
- Unitary authority: Dorset
- Ceremonial county: Dorset
- Region: South West
- Country: England
- Sovereign state: United Kingdom
- Post town: WIMBORNE
- Postcode district: BH21
- Dialling code: 01725
- Police: Dorset
- Fire: Dorset and Wiltshire
- Ambulance: South Western
- UK Parliament: North Dorset

Cranborne is a village in Dorset, England. At the 2011 census, the parish had a population of 779, remaining unchanged from 2001.

Until 2019 the appropriate electoral ward was called 'Crane'. This ward included Wimborne St. Giles in the west and south to Woodlands. The total population of this ward at the 2011 census was 2,189. After 2019 structural changes to local government in England, Cranborne is part of the Cranborne and Alderholt ward which elects 1 member to Dorset Council.

Once a very small, intensely agricultural market town, the village is on chalk downland called Cranborne Chase, part of a large expanse of chalk in southern England which includes the nearby Salisbury Plain and Dorset Downs.

== History ==
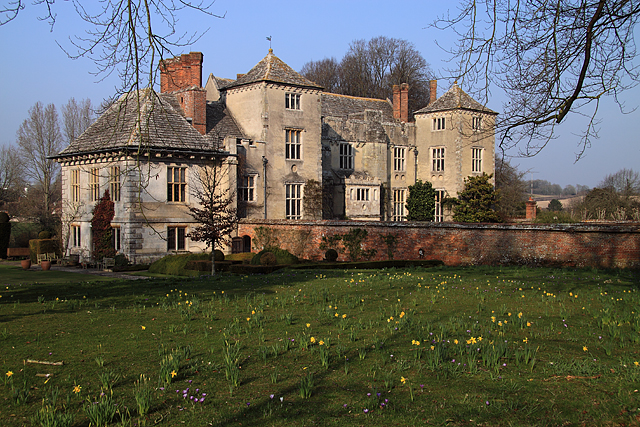
Cranborne Manor

The village dates from Saxon times and was recorded in the Domesday Book of 1086 as Creneburne, meaning stream (bourne) of cranes.

In the 10th century the Benedictine abbey known as Cranborne Abbey was founded by a knight by the name of Haylward Snew (or Aethelweard Maew) who made it the parent house of the religious foundation at Tewkesbury. This arrangement lasted until 1102, when Robert Fitz Hamon greatly enlarged the church of Tewkesbury and transferred the community from Cranborne there transforming Cranborne Abbey into a priory subject to Tewkesbury Abbey. The priory was fully subject to Tewkesbury until the dissolution of the abbey in 1540. The priory buildings were demolished in 1703, but the Norman priory church of St Mary and St Bartholomew survives as the parish church.

In the 13th century, King John visited the downs for the hunt and the town hosted several subsequent kings, notably Henry VIII who founded the hunting lodge in the village. The medieval hunting lodge was modified by Robert Cecil, 1st Earl of Salisbury by William Arnold between 1607 and 1611 to create Cranborne Manor House, a mixture of medieval walls and Renaissance architecture, for King James I who also came to the downs for the hunt. Since 1605, "Viscount Cranborne" has been the courtesy title of the heir of the Earl of Salisbury.

The village was a market town in times when it was frequented by royalty, and housed a garrison of soldiers to protect the king. The town's population was at one time comparably large, but its importance and power have dwindled as other more accessible towns have overtaken it in size.

Cranborne was for many centuries the centre of the hundred of the same name.

== Church ==
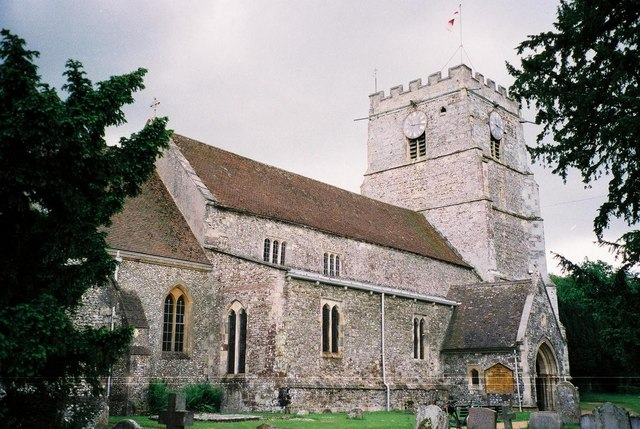
Cranborne church

The church of St Mary and St Bartholomew is of 12th-century origin but most of the building is now of the 13th and 15th centuries. There is a massive 15th-century tower and the chancel was rebuilt in the 19th century. There are 14th-century wall paintings and a 15th-century pulpit.

== Ancient Technology Centre ==
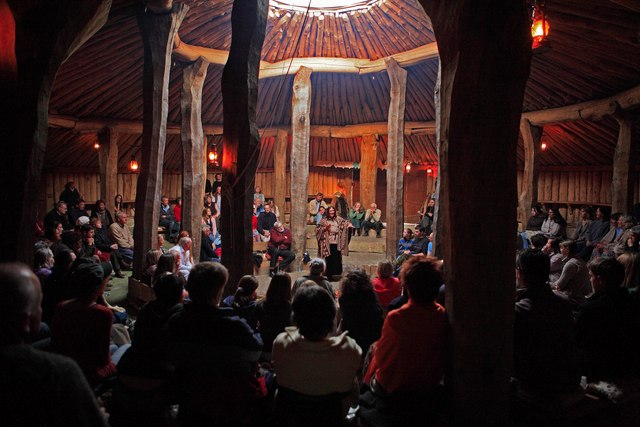
Inside the roundhouse

In the 1980s, a reproduction of an Iron Age dwelling, a roundhouse, was built at the back of Cranborne Middle School, as an exercise in experimental archaeology. It was later expanded into a living museum as the Cranborne Ancient Technology Centre, operated by Dorset County Council. There are several reconstructed buildings and demonstrations, and educational courses on Iron Age craftworking.

== See also ==
- Mission Rabies
