= Gussage All Saints =

Village and civil parish in Dorset, England

Coordinates: 50.897°N 2.004°W

- Gussage All Saints Church

- Location within Dorset
- Population: 245 (2021 census)
- OS grid reference: ST998108
- Civil parish: Gussage All Saints
- Unitary authority: Dorset
- Ceremonial county: Dorset
- Region: South West
- Country: England
- Sovereign state: United Kingdom
- Post town: Wimborne
- Postcode district: BH21
- Dialling code: 01258
- Police: Dorset
- Fire: Dorset and Wiltshire
- Ambulance: South Western
- UK Parliament: North Dorset

Gussage All Saints is a village and civil parish in the county of Dorset in southern England. It is in the Dorset unitary district of the county, about 8 miles (13 km) north-east of the town of Blandford Forum. It is sited by the side of a small stream in a shallow valley on the lower dip slope of Cranborne Chase. Ackling Dyke, a disused Roman road, crosses the valley to the northwest, and forms the parish boundary at that point.

The village church dates mostly from the early 14th century. The ecclesiastical parish of Gussage All Saints has recently merged with neighbouring Gussage St Michael and joined the Knowlton Circle Benefice which also includes the parishes of Cranborne, Edmondsham, Wimborne St Giles and Woodlands.

To the south of the village lies an Iron Age settlement excavated in 1972 by Dr G. J. Wainwright, of the Department of the Environment. The settlement is formed by an enclosure that is roughly circular in plan and some 3 acres in extent, with a single entrance in the east defined by two pairs of flanking antennae ditches.

== Demographics ==
Census population of Gussage All Saints parish
Census	Population	Female	Male	Households	Source
1921	242				
1931	230				
1951	214				
1961	180				
1971	210				
1981	210				
1991	200				
2001	192	96	96	92	
2011	208	97	111	95	
2021	245	122	123	100	
