= St Saviour's Church, Dottery =

Church in Dorset, England

St Saviour's Church
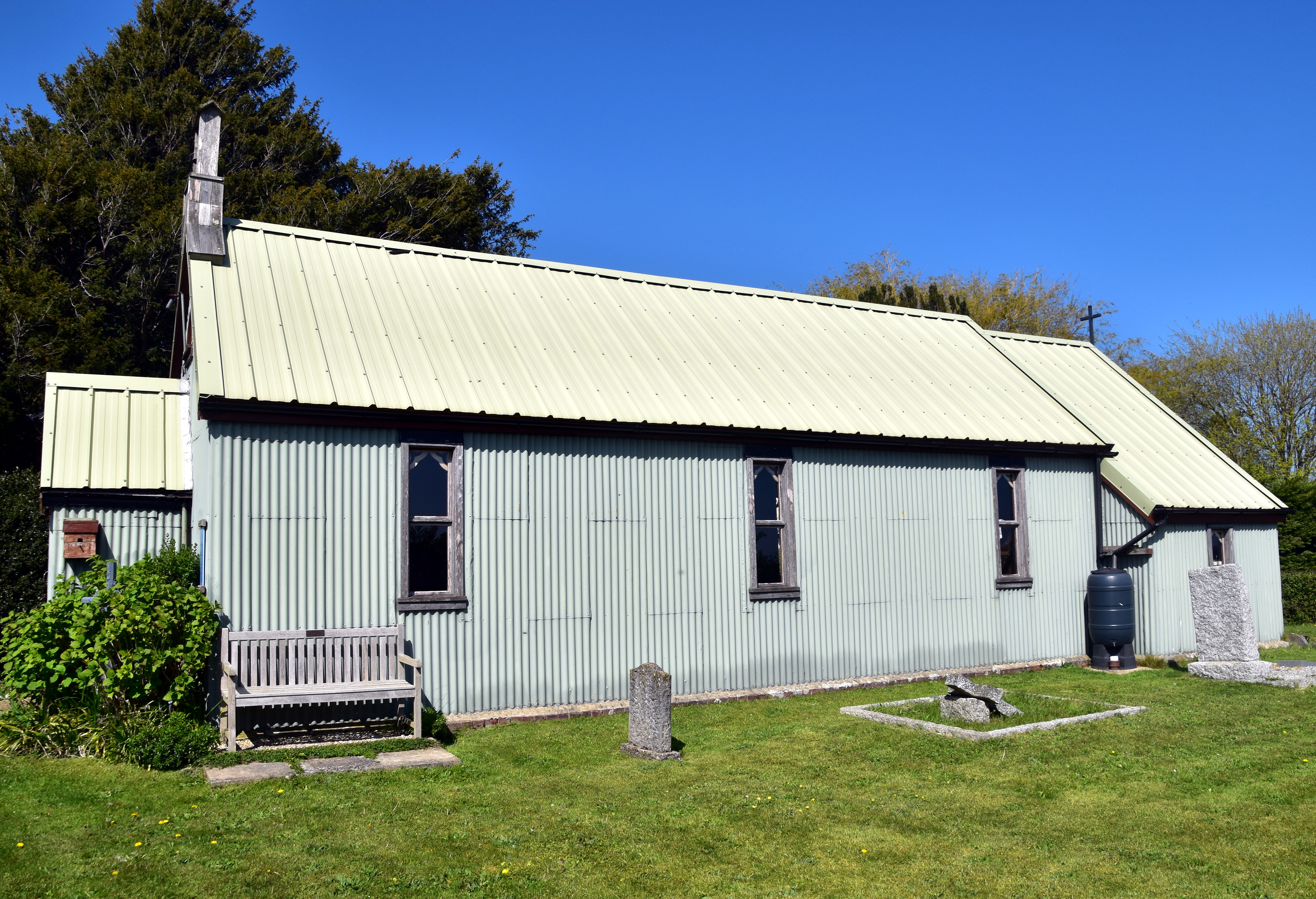
- St Saviour's Church

Religion
- Affiliation: Church of England
- Ecclesiastical or organizational status: Active

Location
- Location: Dottery, Dorset, England
- Interactive map of St Saviour's Church
- Coordinates: 50.7535°N 2.7693°W

Architecture
- Type: Church
- Completed: 1882

St Saviour's Church is a Church of England church in Dottery, Dorset, England. Erected in 1881–82, the corrugated iron church (Tin tabernacle) is the only one of its type in Dorset used for regular worship. Today the church forms part of the United Benefice of Askerswell, Loders, Powerstock and Symondsbury.

== History ==
St Saviour's was erected as a chapel of ease through the efforts of the vicar of Loders, Rev. Dr. Alfred Edersheim, to serve the small, scattered hamlet of Dottery. At the time, Dottery was split between three parishes, Loders, Allington and Netherbury, with residents at least one or two miles away from a church. A small cottage was used to hold services for the inhabitants for a short period, however attendance soon surpassed the capacity of the dwelling, prompting Rev. Edersheim to organise fundraising for an iron church. The church was intended to be temporary until it could be replaced by a permanent building.

The church was erected between November 1881 and January 1882, and declared open on 4 February 1882 by the Archdeacon of Dorset, Thomas Sanctuary, in the presence of a large audience. On the day the archdeacon preached and read a prayer, Canon Broadley of Bradpole and Rev. E. Henslowe, rector of Bridport, read the lessons, while Rev. Edersheim performed the evening service. Although the church had opened free of debt, a collection was held to fund a number of additions, including a bell and harmonium.

In 1886, the church was extended to the east to accommodate a chancel and vestry. The work, which was funded by local landowners and inhabitants, was designed and carried out by Mr. W. Brown of Uploders. A reredos for the chancel was gifted by Mr. Wm. Osmond of Salisbury, while Rev. J. H. Maclean gifted a carved prayer desk of oak and altar frontal. A special service was held on 4 November 1886 to celebrate the completion of the work and the church's reopening.
