= Eggardon (ward) =

Electoral ward in Dorset, England

- ward Dorset Council
- Population: 5,203
- Major settlements: Hooke, Netherbury

Current ward
- Created: 2019
- Councillor: Neil Jeffrey Eysenck (Liberal Democrat)
- Number of councillors: 1

Eggardon is an electoral ward in Dorset, England. Since the 2019 Dorset Council election, it has elected one councillor to Dorset Council.

== Geography ==
Eggardon ward contains the civil parishes of Askerswell, Cattistock, Chilfrome, Compton Valence, Frome St Quintin, Hooke, Loders, Maiden Newton, Netherbury, North Poorton, Powerstock, Rampisham, Toller Fratrum, Toller Porcorum, West Compton, Wraxall, Wynford Eagle.

The ward is rural, containing the western end of the Dorset Downs chalk plateau, including Eggardon Hill, which gives the ward its name. The east of the ward contains the upper Frome valley. The west of the ward contains Powerstock Vale.

== Councillors ==
Election	Councillors
2019	Anthony Alford (Conservative)
2024	Neil Jeffrey Eysenck (Liberal Democrats)

== Elections ==
=== 2019 Dorset Council election ===
2019 Dorset Council election: Eggardon (1 seat)
Party	Candidate	Votes	%	±%
Conservative	Anthony Paul Robin Alford	735	48.1	
Green	Anne Elizabeth Clements	362	23.7	
Liberal Democrats	Robin Potter	271	17.7	
Labour	Lucy Campbell	161	10.5	
Majority				
Turnout			37.50	
Conservative win (new seat)				

=== 2024 Dorset Council election ===
2024 Dorset Council election: Eggardon (1 seat)
Party	Candidate	Votes	%	±%
Liberal Democrats	Neil Jeffrey Eysenck	724	43.7	+26.0
Conservative	Harry Coutts	637	38.5	−9.6
Green	Richard Edwards	238	14.4	−9.3
Labour	David Machin	57	3.4	−7.1
Turnout		1,656	41.08	
Liberal Democrats gain from Conservative		Swing	{{{swing}}}	

== See also ==
- List of electoral wards in Dorset
