= Eggardon =

Eggardon may refer to:

- Eggardon Hill
- Eggardon (ward)
- Eggardon Grit
- Jennifer Hilton, Baroness Hilton of Eggardon

== See also ==
- Eggerton Hundred
