= Mangerton River =

River in Dorset, England

Coordinates: 50.7642°N 2.7079°W

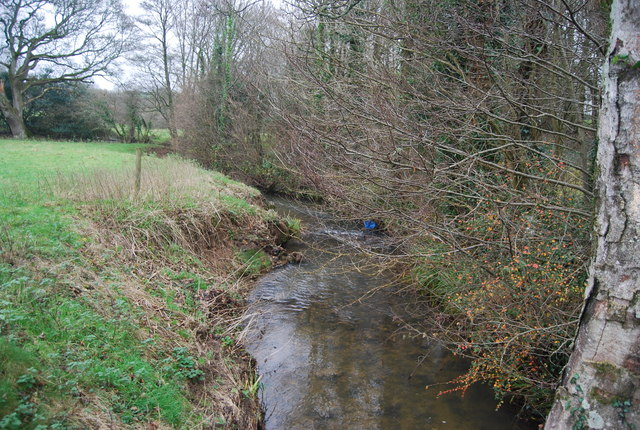
The river in December 2011, near West Milton

The Mangerton River or Mangerton Brook is a 13.37 km (8.31 mi) long river in Dorset, England that is a tributary of the River Asker. The river rises at Powerstock and flows westward through the small village of West Milton (at the centre of the river), then southward through the hamlet Mangerton, before flowing into the River Asker at Bradpole, near Bridport, which itself flows into the River Brit. It also flows through the West Dorset Alder Woods protected area.

Mangerton River powers the Grade II-listed Mangerton Mill.

== Water quality ==
Water quality of the Mangerton River in 2019, according to the Environment Agency:

| Section | Ecological Status | Chemical Status | Overall Status | Length | Catchment | Channel |
|---|---|---|---|---|---|---|
| Mangerton Brook | Good | Fail | Moderate | 13.378 km (8.313 mi) | 25.484 km^{2} (9.839 sq mi) | |
