= Edward Leslie Seager =

English ecclesiastical officer

- Archdeacon of Dorset
- In office: 1955-1974
- Predecessor: Lancelot Farquharson Addison
- Successor: Richard Sharp

Personal details
- Born: 5 October 1904
- Died: 2 November 1983 (aged 79)
- Denomination: Anglican
- Education: Hatfield College, Durham

Edward Leslie Seager was Archdeacon of Dorset from 1955 to 1974.

Born on 5 October 1904, he was educated at Bromsgrove School and Durham University, becoming ordained in 1929.

== Education ==
Seager attended Durham University, where he was a member of Hatfield College.

He was notably involved with the Durham Union Society and the Durham University History Society. He was secretary of the Durham Union during 1926 and President in the Easter Term of 1927. He was also the first president, and thus likely the founder, of the Durham University History Society, his term lasting the Easter term of 1926.

== Career ==
He was Chaplain at Wellington School from 1931 until 1939; and a Chaplain to the Forces from then until 1946. He was Vicar of Gillingham, Dorset from 1946 to 1979, Rural Dean of Shaftesbury from 1951 to 1956; and a Canon of Salisbury Cathedral from 1954 to 1968.

He died on 2 November 1983.
