= Askerswell =

Village and civil parish in Dorset, England

Coordinates: 50.7327°N 2.6687°W

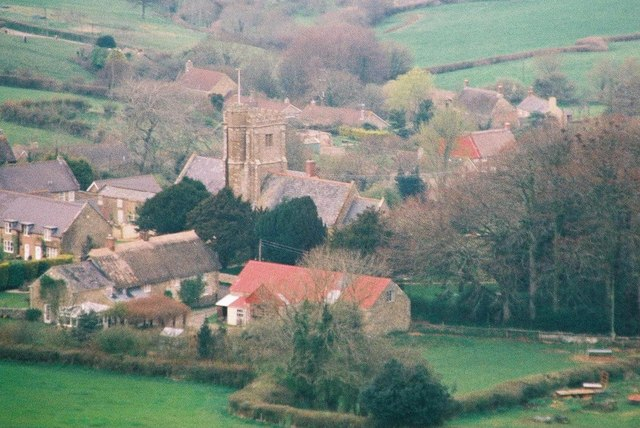
- Askerswell village from the south

- Location within Dorset
- Area: 2.7 sq mi (7.0 km^{2})
- Population: 154
  - Density: 57/sq mi (22/km^{2})
- OS grid reference: SY529927
  - London: 140 miles (225 km)
- Civil parish: Askerswell
- Unitary authority: Dorset
- Ceremonial county: Dorset
- Region: South West
- Country: England
- Sovereign state: United Kingdom
- Post town: DORCHESTER
- Postcode district: DT2
- Dialling code: 01308
- Police: Dorset
- Fire: Dorset and Wiltshire
- Ambulance: South Western
- UK Parliament: West Dorset
- Website: http://www.askerswell.co.uk/

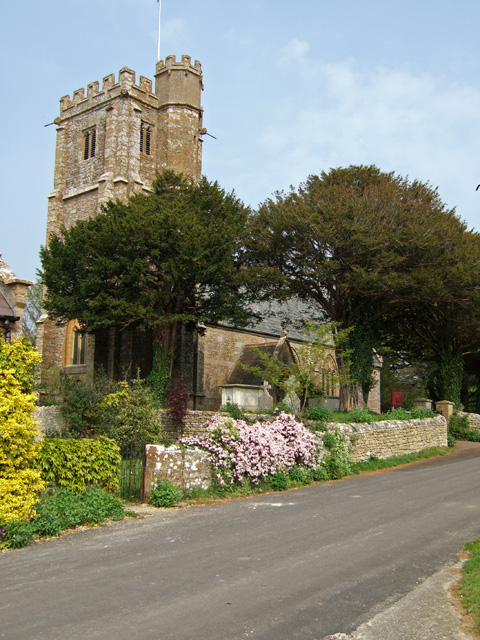
Parish church of St Michael

Askerswell (/ˈæskərzwəl/) is a small village and civil parish in the county of Dorset in southwest England. It is sited on the small River Asker. It lies 11 miles (18 km) west of the county town Dorchester. The parish has an area of 1,724 acres (2.69 sq mi; 698 ha) and in the northeast includes the western slopes of Eggardon Hill, including part of the Iron Age hill fort close to its summit. In the 2011 census the civil parish had a population of 154.

== Toponymy ==
The name Askerswell is derived from Osgar's Well or its Viking equivalent Asger's Well, though local tradition is that Askers' Well is Dorset dialect for newts' well and refers to the name of the stream flowing through the village ("Askers" or the River Asker).

== History ==
In 1086 in the Domesday Book Askerswell was recorded as Oscherwille; it had 30 households, was in Eggardon Hundred and the lord and tenant-in-chief was Tavistock Abbey.

Askerswell parish church has an early 15th-century west tower, but the rest of the building was rebuilt by Talbot Bury in 1858.

There are twenty structures in the parish that are listed by English Heritage for their historic or architectural interest. There are no structures listed as Grade I (the highest rating), but the parish church and South Eggardon Farmhouse are Grade II*.

== Governance ==
At the lower tier of local government, Askerswell is a civil parish. It does not have a parish council; instead it has a parish meeting.

At the upper tier, Askerwell is in the Dorset unitary authority. For elections to Dorset Council, Askerswell is in the Eggardon electoral ward. Historically, Askerswell was in Eggerton Hundred, Bridport Rural District from 1894 to 1974, and West Dorset district from 1974 to 2019.

In the United Kingdom national parliament Askerswell is in the West Dorset parliamentary constituency.

== Geography ==
Askerswell civil parish extends from the A35 trunk road on Askerswell Down in the south to the Iron Age hillfort on Eggardon Hill in the northeast and Knowle Hill in the northwest. Its altitude is between about 50 metres (160 ft) where the River Asker leaves the parish in the west up to about 250 metres (820 ft) on Eggardon Hill. The surrounding parishes are Loders to the west, Shipton Gorge to the southwest, Chilcombe to the south, Litton Cheney to the southeast and east, West Compton to the northeast and Powerstock to the north. All of Askerswell parish is within the Dorset National Landscape area.

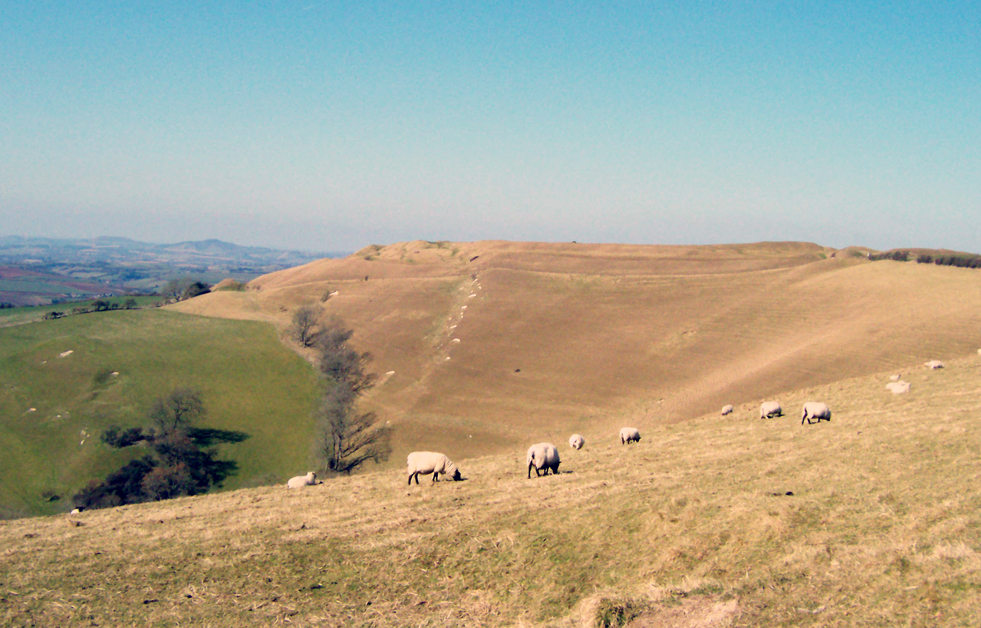
Eggardon Hill, showing the embankments of the Iron Age hillfort

The local travel links are located 5 miles (8.0 km) from the village to Maiden Newton railway station and 33 miles (53 km) to Exeter International Airport. The main road running through the village is Hembury Road.

== Demography ==
In the 2011 census Askerswell civil parish had 86 dwellings, 71 households and a population of 154. The average age of residents was 51.7, compared to 39.3 for England as a whole. 27.9% of residents were age 65 or over, compared to 16.4% for England as a whole.

== Amenities ==
Askerswell village has a village hall, located by the road to Spyway. There is also a village pub, first licensed in 1845 - The Spyway Inn.
