= Uploders =

Village in Dorset, England

Coordinates: 50°44′29″N 2°42′08″W

- Village
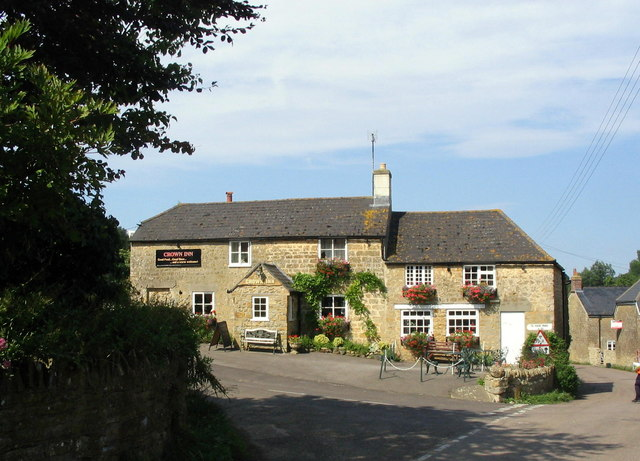
- The Crown Inn

- Location within Dorset
- OS grid reference: SY505938
- Civil parish: Loders
- Unitary authority: Dorset
- Ceremonial county: Dorset
- Region: South West
- Country: England
- Sovereign state: United Kingdom
- Post town: BRIDPORT
- Postcode district: DT6
- Dialling code: 01308
- Police: Dorset
- Fire: Dorset and Wiltshire
- Ambulance: South Western
- UK Parliament: West Dorset

Uploders is a small village in Dorset, England. It consists mainly of houses, and has a pub, the Crown, a Grade II listed Methodist chapel and a playing field. The River Asker runs through the village. It is a linear village, surrounding the minor road between Bridport and Askerswell. It is around 0.5 miles (0.80 km) from Loders, and around 3 miles (4.8 km) from Bridport, the nearest town. The A35 trunk road also passes by around 0.5 miles (0.80 km) south of the village.

There are several places of interest to visit, such as the market town of Bridport, the harbour at West Bay, the beaches along the Jurassic Coast, Burton Bradstock and West Bay being the nearest, and the Iron Age hill fort of Eggardon Hill Which is about 2 miles (3.2 km) To the east.

== See also ==
- Loders
