= William Parish =

William Parish may refer to:

- William Okes Parish, Anglican cleric
- William Douglas Parish, British clergyman, antiquarian, and author on dialects

== See also ==
- William Parish Chilton, American politician and author
- Billy Parish, American environmental entrepreneur, author, and activist
