= Water polo in Dorset =

Water Polo has a long and distinguished history in Dorset, and is arguably the location for the world's first ever structured Water Polo match - held in 1876 off Bournemouth Pier.

The Dorset & District Water Polo League was set up in 1898 with the sport played in rivers and harbour inlets in the county throughout most of the 20th Century, often in front of crowds of up to 1500 spectators.

Teams played in county competitions, against touring teams and occasionally went on tours, however the sport faded towards the end of the 20th Century as swimming moved indoors, however a new league was formed in 2004 with a large junior competition based in swimming pools. Coastal Water Polo continues in the summer at both West Bay and Weymouth.

Club teams in the county compete in a variety of competitions within and outside the county, whilst Dorset county teams compete in the ASA South West Regional Championships annually. Junior, Senior Mens and Senior Ladies County teams also play a fixture against Devon on an annual basis.

== Clubs ==
- Blandford Swimming Club
- Bournemouth Swimming Club
- Bridport Barracudas Swimming Club
- Christchurch & New Milton Seagulls Swimming Club
- Salisbury Stingrays Swimming Club
- St. Mary's School
- Swimming Club
- West Dorset Warriors Swimming Club
- Weymouth & Portland Water Polo Club

== History ==
=== The World's First Organised Water Polo match - 1876 ===
Arguably the very first structured form of the modern game ever played was on 13 July 1876 off Bournemouth Pier between seven "competitors" on each side. The goals were marked by four flags and positioned to the west of the pier 50 yards apart. After a "severe struggle the ball burst but the players were undaunted and went on to display their aquatic accomplishments for some time". Another fixture was held a week later where again the India rubber ball (inside of a football) burst in a game, which was described as "aquatic handball". The occasion is now marked with a plaque at the end of the pier.

=== The Dorset & District Water Polo League - 1898 ===
The "Dorset & District Water Polo League" was formed around 1898 between Bridport, Dorchester, Weymouth and Yeovil, with Yeovil winning the 1899 league and Weymouth the 1900 league. Fixtures were held on a Thursday evening, with Yeovil playing in their "Baths", Dorchester in the "Poundbury Stream" and Bridport in the "Polo Basin" at West Bay. At the end of each season, the Champions played a combined team from the "Rest of the League". Lyme Regis also had a team, although they didn't play in the league.

One of these teams, Bridport Swimming Club was formed in 1898 following a meeting at the town hall. An area of the harbour at West Bay was named the "Polo Basin" to play in, and a referee's stand was built on the piles, with a goal tied to the outside of one of the piers for practice. An annual club "regatta" was held in the summer, which lasted until the late 20th Century, of which the water polo match in front of huge crowds was reported as being the prime event, following the swimming gala. Other than the league matches, various friendly games were played, against teams such as 'A' Company VBDE, Captain v Vice Captains teams, and Residents v Visitors. In 1910 two thousand spectators turned up to watch the town team play Frome, and TV footage from the 1920s/1930s shows Bridport, having moved their pitch from the 'Polo Basin' in the harbour to the river, playing in front of huge crowds of around 1500. A spectator stand was built with regular matches played against local and touring teams there until the late 1980s.

=== Dorset Water Polo League ===
We can only assume that water polo continued to flourish when the soldiers returned from the First World War because when the Dorset County Amateur Swimming Association was formed in 1931 it paid for a senior men's championship shield which is still competed for today. The first winners on this trophy were Bridport, the only time the town lifted the championship.

After the Second World War, Portland became the supreme force in Dorset water polo winning the championship shield 21 years on the trot. Weymouth also had a strong water polo side during this time and there was a great deal of local rivalry. It was also a time when water polo was the main event and the crowd was attracted to the game more than the swimming gala, which often preceded it. Weymouth went on to win in 1971 and 1972.

Bridport, another leading club at the time, ran three teams and had regular visits from clubs like the mighty Cheltenham and Weston-super-Mare and touring London sides. During the summer, the team was cheered on by hundreds of holiday makers and locals alike with a match collection making the club very wealthy. Sometimes, Dorset's water polo players had more than their opponents to contend with. During one match at West Bay, a dead sheep floated into the playing area and on another occasion a dog decided to jump in and become one of the players.

The Dorset League was at the time a flourishing annual competition with teams from Bridport, Portland, Weymouth, Wareham, Lyme Regis and Swanage taking part. The sport continued to flourish through the post-war period. By the beginning of the 1970s, new indoor pools were being built in most major towns in the county and indeed all over the country. Ironically, this contributed to the decline of water polo as the river and the sea was no longer so attractive to play in. It meant also that for those clubs that still played the game in swimming pools, their playing time was often relegated to less sociable hours with games and practices often ending at 10pm.

=== The Lean Period - 1980s & 1990s ===
All through the 1980s and 1990s, Bournemouth continued to play in the Hampshire League and still does today. However, from around 1972, the Weymouth and Portland clubs only played the odd game and some players went off to play for Yeovil just over the Somerset border. Bridport continued to play in the River Brit until the late 1980s when flood alleviation work was undertaken.

However, in the mid 1990s there were the "green shoots" of revival, as the Wessex Water Polo Club reformed in 1983 started to play in the Wiltshire league and then in the Bristol & West league, winning promotion to Division One in the 1994/95 season. The club reformed in 2001 becoming Weymouth & Portland playing in the Hampshire league and becoming either winners or runners-up many times. Bridport formed a new team at their new swimming pool in 1994, playing friendly matches.

=== The Revival - 2000s ===
In 2004 a group consisting of existing clubs and new clubs around the county got together to form a new Dorset Water Polo League. In addition to Senior Mens Water Polo, the league added a large mixed Junior element as well as a Senior Ladies competition. The sport has continued to grow and teams are now competing outside the county.

== Competitions ==
=== Dorset Water Polo League ===
The Dorset Water Polo League runs from October to June and leagues currently run for the following categories:-

- Key Stage 2
- Key Stage 3
- Juniors
- Senior Men
- Senior Ladies

=== Dorset Water Polo Senior Mens Championship Shield ===
A trophy first competed for in 1931. The current holders are Bournemouth Swimming Club.

== Dorset County Team ==
The county operates a development day once a term basis at St Mary's School, Shaftesbury for players looking to develop their skills. Top level coaches are often brought in to give players a level of training above their clubs.

County teams play at ASA South West Regional Championships on an annual basis in the following categories:-

- 18 & Under Boys
- 16 & Under Girls
- 14 & Under Mixed

In addition, Dorset resurrected a traditional fixture against Devon in 2008, with Senior Mens, Senior Ladies & Junior Boys competing.

== See also ==
- Water Polo
