= Oxbridge, Dorset =

Hamlet in Dorset, England

Coordinates: 50.777°N 02.746°W

Oxbridge
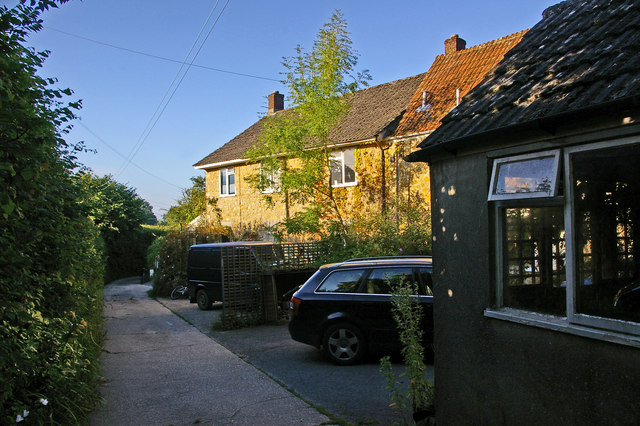

- Location within Dorset
- OS grid reference: SY475977
- Civil parish: Netherbury
- Unitary authority: Dorset
- Ceremonial county: Dorset
- Region: South West
- Country: England
- Sovereign state: United Kingdom
- Police: Dorset
- Fire: Dorset and Wiltshire
- Ambulance: South Western

Oxbridge is a hamlet in the English county of Dorset. It lies on the River Brit between Bridport and Beaminster.
