= Mary Anna Needell =

English novelist (1830–1922)

Mary Anna Needell (née Lupton, 1830–1922), was a popular English novelist, who usually wrote as Mrs. J. H. Needell. She was born at Vanbrugh Castle, Blackheath, Kent, now divided between the London boroughs of Greenwich and Lewisham. Little has been discovered about her personal background or life.

== Married life ==
Mary Anna Lupton's father was John Lupton, described on her marriage certificate as a merchant. She was married at All Hallows, Bread Street on 4 May 1854 to John Hodder Needell (Netherbury, Dorset, 16 September 1814 – Beaminster, July 1881) of Allington, Dorset, son of Thomas Wallace Needell, also described as a merchant.

J. H. Needell's business affairs seem to have been sporadic and unsuccessful. His calico printing and warehousing partnership with a certain William Gregory Langdon in London, Cheapside, is known to have ended in February 1848. He was involved in litigation with the Western Bank of Scotland over the insolvent firm of John Monteith and Co., in which he claimed to have retired as a partner in 1855, having "moved to the country" in 1852.

The Needells had a son, also called John Hodder Needell, and daughters called Flora Nicholetts, Kate, Beatrice and Marian. The last may be the same as a Mary Ann [sic] Needell, born in 1855. The family was living at Netherbury, Dorset at the time of the 1881 census. Mary Anna Needell's husband died at Beaminster and was buried at Allington.

== Writings ==
In a Who's Who entry in 1907, Mrs Needle stated she was "a student and writer up to the period of marriage; during a long married life of engrossing claims my literary production was suspended, to be resumed in 1881," i. e. after her husband's death.

Needell wrote at least twelve novels. They include Catherine Irving (anonymously, 1855), Stephen Ellicott's Daughter (c. 1880), Julian Karslake's Secret* (1881), Lucia, Hugh, and Another* (1884), also published in the United States and telling of "an 'ideal marriage' which becomes a painful trap". The Story of Philip Methuen (1886), said to be her most popular work, was followed by Noel Chetwynd's Fall (1888) and then Unequally Yoked (1891), about the marriage of a parson to a woman "beneath him" – called "a very inferior and somewhat unpleasing tale" by The Athenaeum, but noted in recent times as featuring "a slum girl who grows in stature to match [her husband's] spirit." Later came Passing the Love of Women* (1892), The Vengeance of James Vansittart (1895), The Honour of Vivien Bruce (1899) and Unstable as Water (1902). Ada Gresham. An Autobiography (1853) also appears to be fictional. It has "an odd unlikeable heroine and is interesting on birth and supporting a child alone."

Many novels Needell wrote after her husband's death reappeared, also in America. Some critics have noted influence from Charlotte Brontë. In addition, Needell contributed several short stories in periodicals and annuals. She is not thought to have published anything substantial after 1902.
