= Henry Tynchiner =

Henry Tynchiner is recorded as holding the Archdeaconry of Dorset during 1572.
