= James Proctor (priest) =

English priest

James Proctor was a priest in England during the 16th century.

A Cistercian, he was educated at the University of Oxford. He held livings at Islip (perhaps), Thornton (Richmondshire), Normanton-upon-Soar, Binbrook, Abbots Ripton, Winterbourne Gunner, Berwick St Leonard, Malmesbury, East Hendred and Bratton Fleming. He was Archdeacon of Dorset from 1572 until 1575.
