= Bridport East Street railway station =

Disused railway station in Dorset, England

Coordinates: 50.7326°N 2.7502°W

Bridport East Street
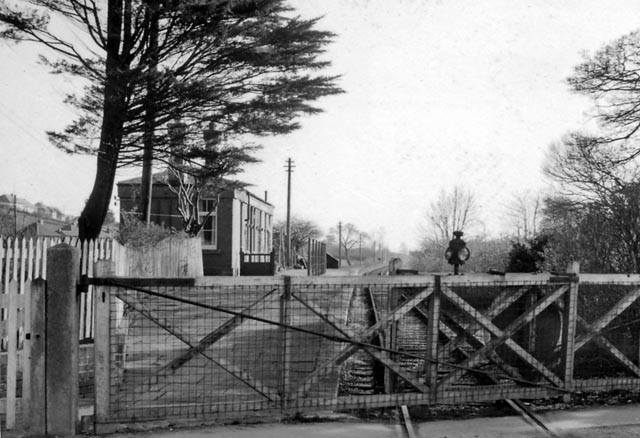
- Remains of the station in 1963

General information
- Location: Bridport, Dorset; England
- Grid reference: SY471928
- Platforms: 1

Other information
- Status: Disused

History
- Pre-grouping: Bridport Railway; GWR
- Post-grouping: GWR

Key dates
- 31 March 1884: Opened
- 1 January 1916: Closed
- 5 January 1920: Reopened
- 11 April 1921: Closed
- 11 July 1921: Reopened
- 22 September 1924: Closed
- 6 October 1924: Reopened
- 22 September 1930: Closed
Location

Bridport East Street was a railway station on the Bridport Railway in the west of the English county of Dorset. Opened on 11 March 1884, before the extension terminus at West Bay, it was just south of the level crossing on the A35 Dorchester to Honiton road, slightly nearer the centre of Bridport than the main station at Bradpole Road. Closed during the First World War and again in 1921, the station closed permanently with the West Bay extension on 22 September 1930, when the Great Western Railway gave up on hopes of creating a resort at West Bay.

== The site today ==
Nothing is now left as the site has been under the A35 Bridport town centre bypass for many years.

| Preceding station | Disused railways | Following station |
|---|---|---|
| Bridport; Line and station closed | Great Western Railway; Bridport Railway | West Bay (Bridport); Line and station closed |
