= Bridport railway station =

Disused railway station in Dorset, England

Bridport
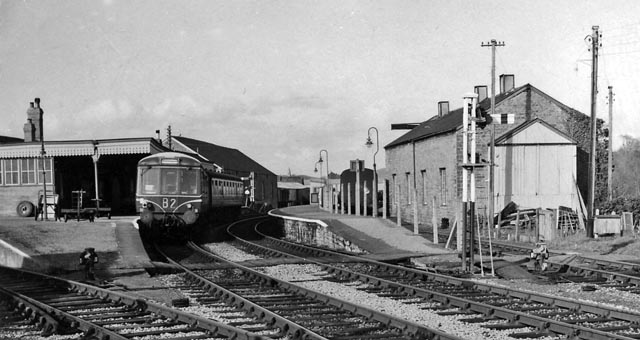
- The station in 1963

General information
- Location: England
- Coordinates: 50.73774°N 2.74677°W
- Grid reference: SY473933
- Platforms: 2

Other information
- Status: Disused

History
- Original company: Bridport Railway
- Pre-grouping: Great Western Railway
- Post-grouping: Great Western Railway

Key dates
- 12 November 1857: Opened as Bridport
- 1887: Renamed Bridport Bradpole Road
- 1902: Renamed Bridport
- 5 May 1975: Closed
Location

Bridport railway station formerly served the town of Bridport in the English county of Dorset. The station was on the Maiden Newton-Bridport branch line; the station (and branch line) opened in 1857 and was closed by British Rail in 1975.

== History ==
Called simply Bridport when the branch opened on 12 November 1857, the station was renamed Bridport (Bradpole Road) in 1887, shortly after the West Bay extension opened, to distinguish it from the new East Street and West Bay stations. In 1902 the name reverted to Bridport. For most of its existence the station had two platforms, a small goods yard, an engine shed, and a signal box. It was the only location on the single-track branch where two passenger trains could pass each other.

Although operated from the outset by the Great Western Railway, the branch was only bought by that company in 1901. When the railways were nationalised in 1948. the station became part of the Western Region of British Railways. Between 1950 and 1962 the Southern Region took over, painting the station in the region's then-standard green and cream with green signage - some of which remained until closure.The station was transferred back to the Western Region in 1963.

In 1930, after the second (and final) withdrawal of West Bay passenger trains, the station again became the passenger terminus. The goods service to West Bay was withdrawn in 1962, with the track south of Bridport station lifted in 1965. Goods trains to Bridport were withdrawn in April 1965. As diesel multiple units had been introduced for passenger trains in 1959 this allowed the track at the station to be simplified, with all sidings removed and just a single track serving one platform. The once well-kept Bridport station became unstaffed in 1969 and became increasingly dilapidated.

The branch line was threatened in the Beeching report of March 1963, eventually being put up for closure in October 1965. Narrow, twisty roads serving the intermediate stations at Powerstock and Toller, unsuitable for buses, brought about a reprieve in June 1967. The passenger service was then subsidised by a central government grant under the 1968 Transport Act. However falling passenger numbers eventually led to Bridport station (along with the rest of the branch from Maiden Newton) closing on and from 5 May 1975 - the penultimate closure directly linked to the Beeching cuts (prior to the closure of the Alston branch line in Cumbria in 1976).

== The site today ==
Bridport station buildings were demolished in 1977 and the site cleared. The location of the former station and all its sidings and goods facilities have now been converted into an industrial estate containing two supermarkets and a builders merchants.

Preceding station	Disused railways	Following station
Powerstock; Line and station closed	Great Western Railway; Bridport Railway	East Street (Bridport); Line and station closed
