= West Bay, Dorset =

English resort and harbour

Coordinates: 50.7116°N 2.763750°W

West Bay
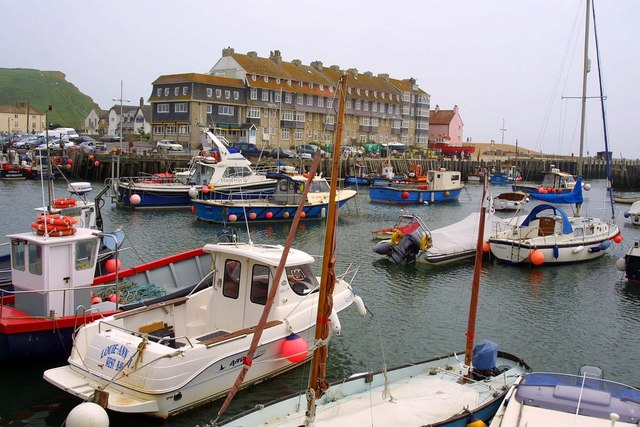
- The harbour and Pier Terrace at West Bay

- Location within Dorset
- OS grid reference: SY464904
  - London: 145 miles (233 km)
- Civil parish: Bridport, Symondsbury
- Unitary authority: Dorset
- Ceremonial county: Dorset
- Region: South West
- Country: England
- Sovereign state: United Kingdom
- Post town: Bridport
- Postcode district: DT6
- Police: Dorset
- Fire: Dorset and Wiltshire
- Ambulance: South Western
- UK Parliament: West Dorset

West Bay, originally known as Bridport Harbour, is a small harbour settlement and resort on the English Channel coast in Dorset, England, sited at the mouth of the River Brit approximately 1.5 miles (2.4 km) south of Bridport. The area is part of the Jurassic Coast, a World Heritage Site.

The harbour at West Bay is not a natural landscape feature and it has a long history of having been silted up, blocked by shingle and damaged by storms, and each time repairs, improvements and enlargements have subsequently been made. The harbour has been moved twice: it was originally 1 mile (1.6 km) inland, then was moved to the coast beside the East Cliff, then was moved again 270 metres (300 yd) along the coast to the west, where it is located today.

The previous main commercial trade of the harbour—exporting Bridport's ropes and nets—declined in the second half of the 19th century. When the railway arrived in 1884, attempts were made to provide the settlement with the facilities of a resort, and today West Bay has a mixed economy of tourism and fishing.

== History ==
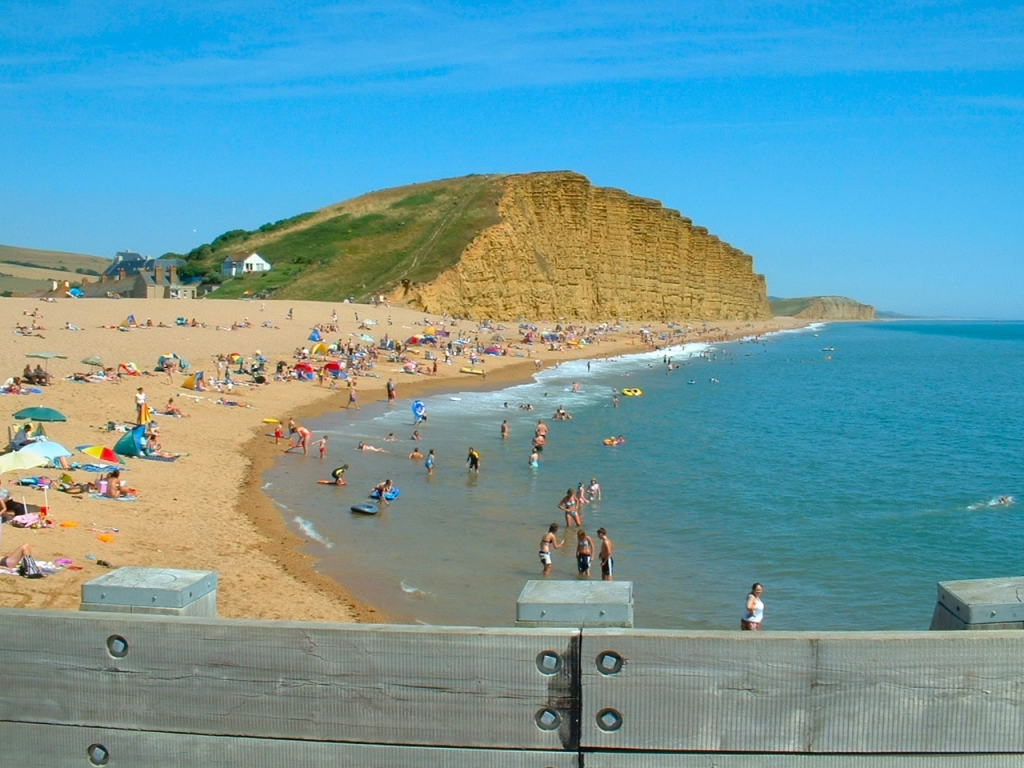
East Beach and East Cliff. Before the mid 18th century, the harbour and river mouth were near the base of the grassy slope

Bridport historically needed a harbour to export its principal products, rope and nets. Originally the harbour was about 1 mile (1.6 km) inland, close to the town, and its exit to the sea—the river mouth—was 270 metres (300 yd) east of its current position. The Anglo-Saxons and Normans struggled to keep the harbour open because the river mouth repeatedly silted up and was blocked by shingle from Chesil Beach, so eventually a system of sluices was devised to help keep it clear.

In 1388 John Huderesfeld, a local merchant, started building a new harbour and levied a toll on goods loaded and unloaded. The toll was a market privilege granted to him for three years as a result of his petition that finishing the construction would not be possible without aid. After completion in 1395 a customs officer was employed full-time as trade grew. The new harbour prospered for fifty years until winter storms and an outbreak of Black Death damaged respectively its structure and trade, so in 1444 construction of a new harbour commenced—prompted by an indulgence granted by the Bishop of Sarum—and on its completion the harbour again prospered.

By the 18th century the small harbour was ill-equipped to deal with the increasing size of ships, plus the problems of silting and storm damage had never been fully resolved, so in 1740 work commenced on building another new harbour 270 metres (300 yd) to the west. This is the site of the harbour as seen today. Two piers, extending as far as the low tide mark, were constructed to house the harbour. The river was also diverted to run between the piers. The work cost £3,500 and was undertaken by John Reynolds of Cheshire. It was supposed to have taken only two years, but the new harbour didn't open officially until 1744. It could hold forty sailing ships.

Shipbuilding yards were set up west of the new harbour. They constructed a variety of vessels including frigates, cutters, schooners, brigantines, barques and fishing smack. The first registered launch was the 270 ton brig Adventurer in 1779, the last was the Lilian exactly a century later. The largest launch was the 1,002 ton Speedy in 1853. At one point the yards employed 300 men. In 1823, to accommodate further increases in trade, the basin of the harbour was enlarged eastwards and the old harbour gates were replaced by a sluice. As well as exporting Bridport's ropes, the harbour also imported raw materials such as gravel, coal and timber. By 1830 over 500 vessels were using the harbour each year.

Around 1865 the wooden piers were rebuilt in stone and the sluices were rebuilt. Despite these improvements however, trade at the harbour had begun to decline. Bridport's rope and nets were in less demand, and sailing ships were being supplanted by steam-powered vessels. In addition, the Great Western Railway's Bridport Railway had reached Bridport in 1857, and started taking the harbour's trade. The amount of harbour dues taken showed the extent of the decline: in 1881 they amounted to only 10% of those collected half a century before.

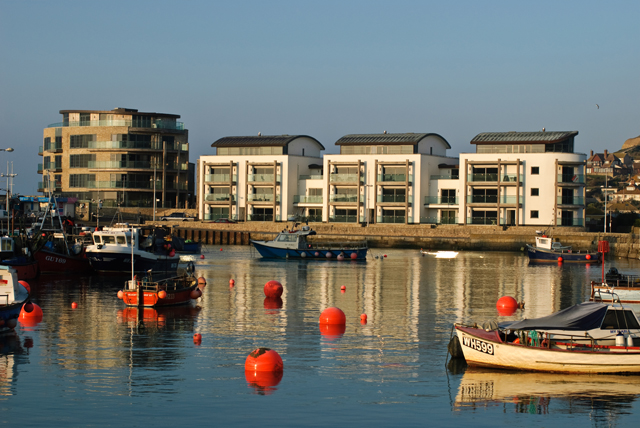
The new Quay West development on the west side of the harbour

The railway was extended from Bridport to Bridport Harbour in 1884. The railway company named the new harbour station West Bay, as part of an effort to rebrand the harbour as a resort. Local businessmen—including the archaeologist Augustus Pitt Rivers and the Earl of Ilchester—funded the extension. Subsequently, they established the West Bay Building Company to build villas and lodging houses for visitors. Only a terrace of ten lodging houses—Pier Terrace—was completed, designed by the Arts and Crafts Movement architect Edward Schroeder Prior in 1885. In 1942, because the terrace had an appearance reminiscent of some northern French ports, West Bay was used as a training ground for the Dieppe Raid. The terrace remains a prominent feature of the harbourside.

Outdoor theatre at The Mount, West Bay, Dorset in the early 20th century

Between 1919 and 1930, coinciding with increased car ownership and personal mobility, new housing was built on the hillslope to the west of the harbour, on the landward side of West Cliff. The railway line between West Bay and Bridport closed to passengers in 1930, and operated for goods services only until its final closure in 1962. The station however was restored in the 1980s, and two old railway coaches have been installed on a short length of relaid track. In the second half of the 20th century further residential and tourism-related development occurred around the harbour and old shipbuilding area: new houses were built, old buildings were converted into cafés and shops, and several car parks were created.

At the start of the 21st century, as part of a new coastal defence scheme, the harbour's west pier was replaced and the east pier rebuilt; the work was completed in March 2005. The new west pier is named the Jurassic Pier. The scheme extended the facilities of the harbour, with a new slipway and outer harbour. This has enabled the harbour to be used on the 50% of days when southerly swell conditions occur, which previously was not possible. After the construction work a small regeneration scheme was implemented, with new housing—called Quay West—built on the west side of the harbour, on part of the old shipyard area.

== Government ==
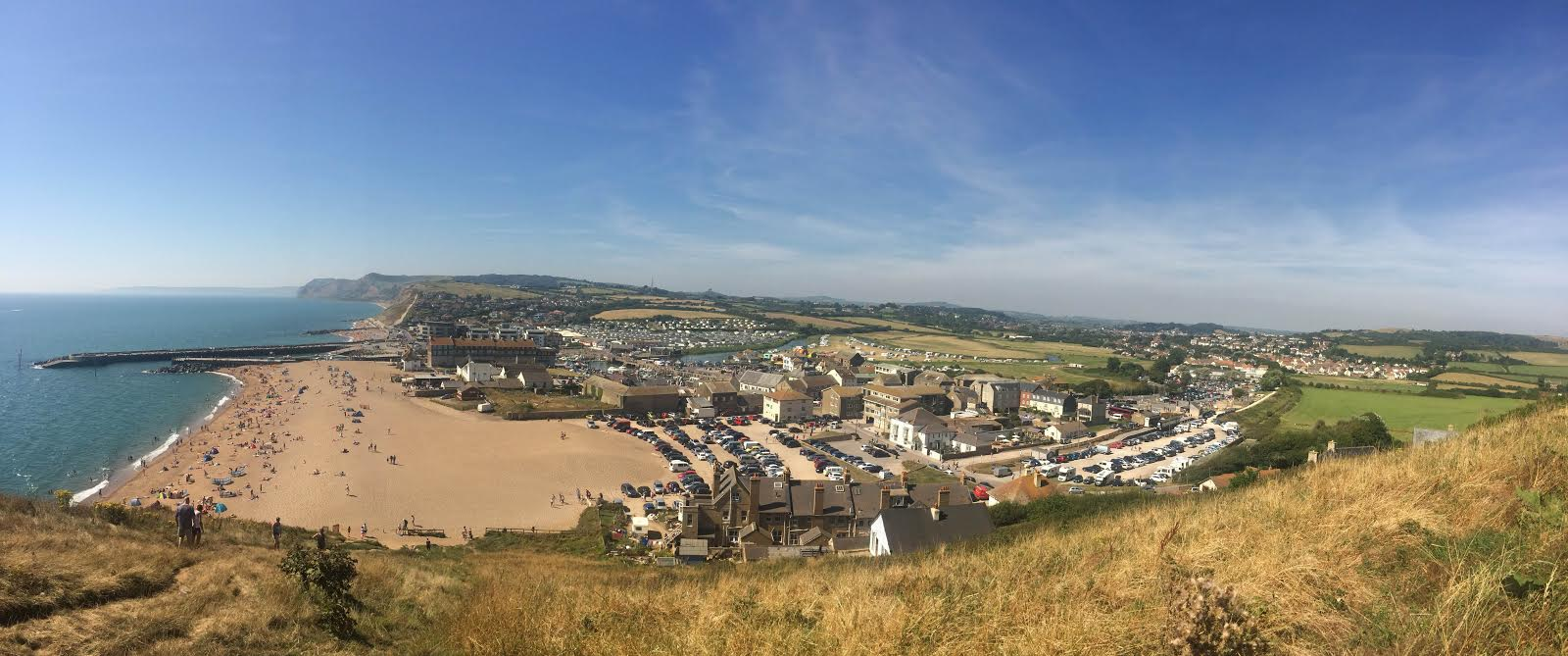
West Bay as viewed from East Cliff

For elections to the Parliament of the United Kingdom, West Bay is within the West Dorset parliamentary constituency.

In local government, Dorset Council is responsible for services such as highways, public transport, strategic planning, environmental services and environmental health, tourism and leisure, economic development, local planning and development control, and social services. For elections to the council, West Bay is in the Bridport electoral ward.

At the parish level, West Bay is mostly within the South ward of Bridport Parish, though small areas also lie within the parishes of Symondsbury and Burton Bradstock. The parish authority for Bridport is Bridport Town Council, which is responsible for supplementing local government services and promoting and representing the town. The South ward is represented by nine councillors.

== Geography and geology ==
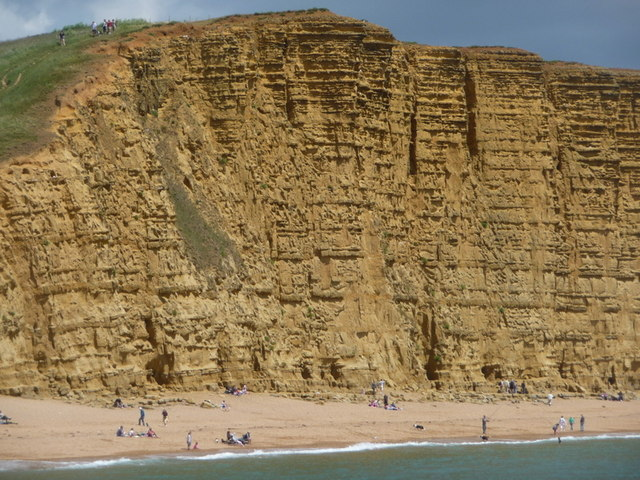
View of East Cliff, showing the alternating horizontal bands of harder and softer rock strata

West Bay is situated at the mouth of the River Brit on the English Channel coast. It is 1.5 miles (2.4 km) south of Bridport and 15 miles (24 km) west-northwest of Weymouth and lies within the Dorset unitary authority area. The coast at West Bay forms part of the Jurassic Coast, a World Heritage Site which stretches for 96 miles (154 km) and includes most of the Dorset coastline. West Bay also lies within the Dorset National Landscape.

West Bay is sited on deposits of river alluvium that indicate a former estuary. There are beaches and cliffs on either side of the harbour. The beaches were previously of a similar size—in terms of their seaward extent—but now East Beach is considerably larger, due to accumulation of finer sediment. East Beach is also designated a Site of Special Scientific Interest, and forms one end of Chesil Beach, a barrier beach which extends southeast for 18 miles (29 km) toward the Isle of Portland.

The cliffs to the east of the harbour are composed of Bridport Sand Formation and Inferior Oolite, while immediately to the west they are Frome Clay (Upper Fullers Earth) and Forest Marble. The Bridport Sands deposits were laid down in the Toarcian Age toward the end of the Early Jurassic; they are arranged horizontally with clear banding visible alternating between harder and softer material. The cliff's distinctive colour is a result of oxidisation of fine pyrite grains, resulting in limonite. The Frome Clay and Forest Marble of the West Cliff are younger and were formed in the Bathonian Age of the Middle Jurassic. The section of the West Cliff closest to the harbour has been engineered as part of coastal defence management; large protective boulders on the foreshore are backed by a sea wall, promenade and artificial grass-covered slope.

There are several geological faults in the West Bay area. The Eype Mouth Fault, resulting from movement late in the Cimmerian Orogeny (but probably originating in the Jurassic), has a vertical displacement of 200 metres (660 ft) and is aligned east-west, emerging on the coast obliquely in West Cliff. It is intersected in the Brit Valley by the Mangerton Strike-Slip Fault, a later movement—probably Paleogene or Neogene—which is aligned roughly northeast-southwest.

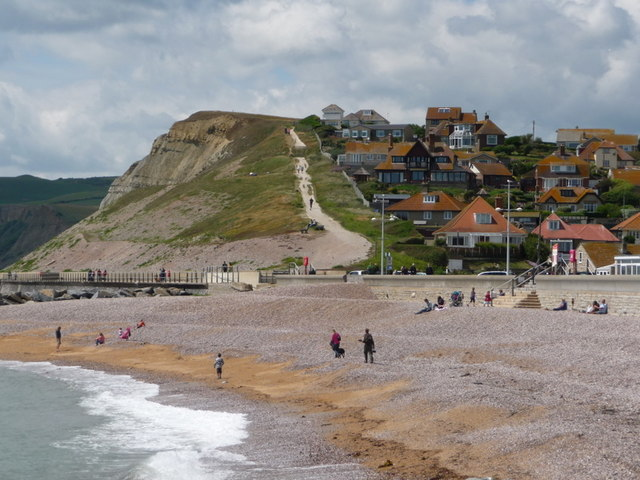
The West Beach and West Cliff, showing the artificial cliff sloping and sea wall protecting the interwar houses on the valley side

=== Coastal defence management ===
The coast at West Bay is an eroding landscape, with various processes involved. The coastline faces southwest—the direction of the prevailing winds—toward the Atlantic Ocean, where the fetch length is over 3,100 miles (5,000 km), resulting in the potential for large and destructive swell waves. The 18th-century construction of the harbour piers interrupted the natural transport of protective sediment along the shore, reducing the size of the West Beach and enabling the sea to more easily cause damage. The West Cliff is subject to the non-marine processes of slipping and mass slumping, caused by the clay sliding over lower layers and possibly exacerbated by faults within it. The East Cliff is protected to a degree by the East Beach, though it is still eroded by wave attrition and pounding at its base, resulting in rock falls.

Over the decades various initiatives have been put in place to try and protect property and livelihoods. A sea wall was constructed behind the West Beach in 1887, then was rebuilt in 1982. The first section of the West Cliff—and the houses behind it—was protected in 1969 with construction of rock piles, a further sea wall, and artificial sloping of the cliff face. In 1986 the East Beach was artificially raised with extra shingle to a height of 7.5 metres (25 ft) above Ordnance Datum; subsequent management by the Environment Agency has involved regular monitoring and replenishment of this shingle barrier.

Despite such measures, serious storm damage or flooding events occurred seven times between 1974 and 1996. Assessments by structural engineers in 2001 concluded that, without remedial action, there was a 50% chance of a major failure of the old piers and sea walls within five years. The recent West Bay Coastal Defence and Harbour Improvements Scheme (construction of the Jurassic Pier and outer harbour) is the latest attempt to solve these problems.

=== Cliff falls ===
The production team of Broadchurch was criticised by the West Bay coastguards in June 2014 for filming too close to the edge of East Cliff. Severe weather and recent rock-slides left the cliffs unstable, and a coastguard volunteer said the production team should have used stakes, safety lines, harnesses, and helmets. A spokesperson for the Broadchurch production defended the film crew, noting that the production team had received all necessary filming permits, had visited the site numerous times to ensure safety, and taken other reasonable health and safety precautions.

In 2019, a 1,000-tonne cliff fall at East Cliff was caught on the Environment Agency's CCTV. A group of walkers were nearby at the time but were not injured.

== Economy ==
West Bay is a centre for fishing, tourism (focused on boats and the beach) and geology.

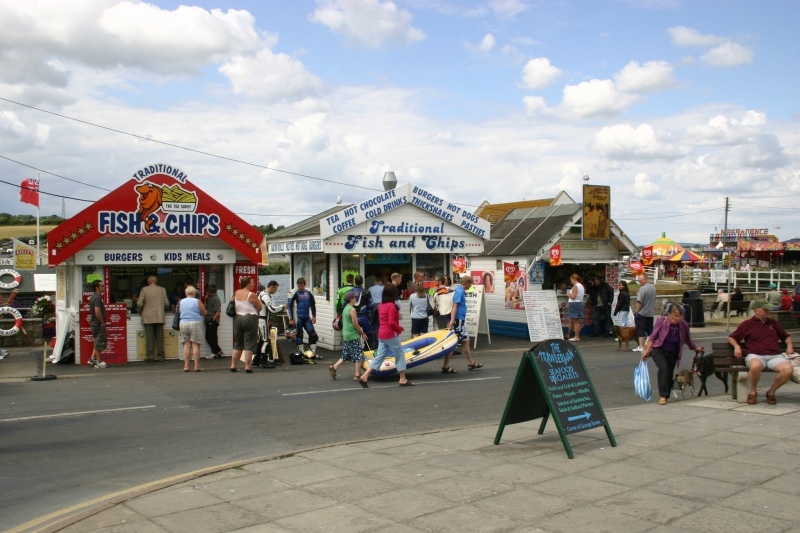
Kiosks selling fish and chips by the harbour

=== Tourism and leisure ===
Fishing trips are available in the summer, including deep sea fishing. Boats can also be hired to row up the River Brit towards Bridport. The harbour has a secure boat park, holding up to seventy boats and entered via an electronic fob system; it is located behind the George Hotel and operates a waiting-list system.

The West Bay area has a number of local caravan and camping sites, as well as hotels and B&Bs, both in the bay area and the surrounding villages such as Burton Bradstock. The West Bay harbour area has many kiosks serving various types of menus, including traditional fish and chips, often with locally caught fish. Near the harbour area are three pubs, each serving food. The Station Kitchen is a restaurant in the old West Bay station which includes a World War One ambulance train carriage.

The Bridport and West Dorset Golf Club, situated on top of the east cliff, has a full 18-hole course.

The West Bay Discovery Centre is a small museum located in the historic (grade II listed) former Methodist Church telling the history of West Bay.

== Filming location ==
West Bay beach was used in the introduction to the BBC television series The Fall and Rise of Reginald Perrin and for location filming in the television series Harbour Lights. The town, harbour, and beach were used as locations in The Navy Lark and the 2013 ITV series Broadchurch. The West Bay and Bridport area experienced an increase in visitor numbers following transmission of Broadchurch; in one survey of sixty tourism-related local businesses, over three-quarters of respondents stated that trade had increased in 2013, and nearly half of these attributed this to Broadchurch. Very short portions of the second and third series were also filmed in the area.

== Literary reference ==
West Bay is mentioned in Thomas Hardy's The Trumpet-Major.

== See also ==
- List of Dorset beaches
- St John's Church, West Bay
- Water polo in Dorset
- West Bay, Dorset railway station
- West Bay Methodist Church
