= Charles Dundas (priest) =

Charles Leslie Dundas (1 November 1847 – 17 March 1932) was an eminent Anglican priest in the late nineteenth and early twentieth centuries.

== Biography ==
Born into an ecclesiastical family on 1 November 1847, he was educated at The King's School, Canterbury, and Brasenose College, Oxford. He was ordained in 1870. After a curacy at St Peter’s, Bournemouth, he was Vicar of Charlton Kings from 1875 until his appointment as Dean of Hobart and Administrator of the Diocese of Tasmania, a post he accepted in 1885 and held for a decade. During this time he was recommended as a suitable candidate for the Bishopric of Tanzania, but was not appointed. After this he held incumbencies at Charminster with Stratton; and then Milton Abbas. In January 1900, the Bishop of Salisbury awarded him a prebendal stall. He was Archdeacon of Dorset from February 1902 to 1926, and a Canon Residentiary at Salisbury Cathedral from 1914 to 1928.

A Fellow of Jesus College, Oxford, he died on 17 March 1932.
