= John Walker (archdeacon of Dorset) =

Anglican priest (1694–1780)

John Walker (b Litton 13 February 1694 – d Bristol 15 November 1780) was Archdeacon of Dorset from 1762 until his death.

Walker was educated at Balliol College, Oxford, where he graduated B.A. in 1715. He held livings at Clevedon and Easton in Gordano. He was a Prebendary of Wells Cathedral.
