= Robert Cooper (priest) =

Priest in England

Robert Cooper (1650-1733) was a priest in England during the late 17th and early 18th centuries.

Cooper was born in Kidderminster and educated at Pembroke College, Oxford. He held the living at Harlington. He was Archdeacon of Dorset from 1698 until his death.
