= Edward Hammond (priest) =

Edward Hammond was a priest in England during the 18th century.

Hammond was born in London and was educated at Christ Church, Oxford. He was incorporated at Cambridge in 1731, in which year he became Vicar of Chippenham. He was Archdeacon of Dorset from 1733 until 1761.
