= Antony MacRow-Wood =

Retired English priest

Antony Charles MacRow-Wood (born April 1960) is a retired priest who served as the Archdeacon of Dorset, 2015–2025.

== Early life ==
MacRow-Wood was educated at Bishop Wordsworth's School and the University of York; and worked in finance from 1982 to 1989. He then trained for the priesthood at Westcott House, Cambridge. He was ordained in 1993. He then served his title at St Andrew, Swindon. After this, he was Team Vicar of the Sutton Pyntz Liberty. He was then with the North Poole Ecumenical Team until his appointment as Archdeacon. He retired in June 2025.
