= Watson Hand =

George Watson Hand (6 March 1750 in Hill Ridware – 3 February 1802 in City of London) was Archdeacon of Dorset from 1780 to 1801.

Hand was educated at Christ Church, Oxford, where he matriculated in 1767, graduating B.A. in 1771, and M.A. in 1774. His first post was as Chaplain to Thomas Newton, Bishop of Bristol. He held livings at St George Botolph Lane and St Giles-without-Cripplegate. He was a Prebendary of St Paul's and Salisbury.
