= William England (priest) =

English clergyman (1767-1834)

William England (26 August 1767 in Blandford Forum – 15 November 1834 in West Stafford) was a Church of England clergyman, Archdeacon of Dorset from 1815 to 1835.

Educated at St John's College, Cambridge, he was Rector of Great Yeldham, Essex from 1782 to 1804. He was Rector of Winterborne Came, Dorset from 1804 to 1820, with St Germaine and Ower Moigne from 1808 to 1820. From 1820 until his death in 1835 he was Rector of Ower Moigne and West Stafford with Frome Billet. He was at St Andrew, West Stafford for over fifty years.
