= Loders =

Village and civil parish in Dorset, England

Coordinates: 50°44′43″N 2°43′00″W

- Village
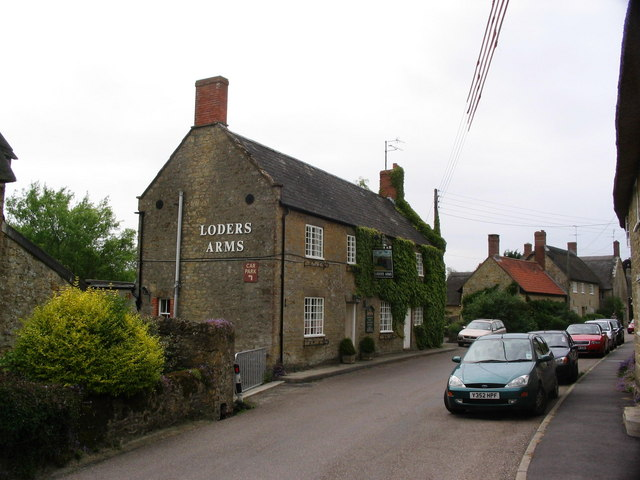
- The Loders Arms

- Location within Dorset
- Population: 518
- OS grid reference: SY495942
- Civil parish: Loders
- Unitary authority: Dorset
- Ceremonial county: Dorset
- Region: South West
- Country: England
- Sovereign state: United Kingdom
- Post town: BRIDPORT
- Postcode district: DT6
- Dialling code: 01308
- Police: Dorset
- Fire: Dorset and Wiltshire
- Ambulance: South Western
- UK Parliament: West Dorset

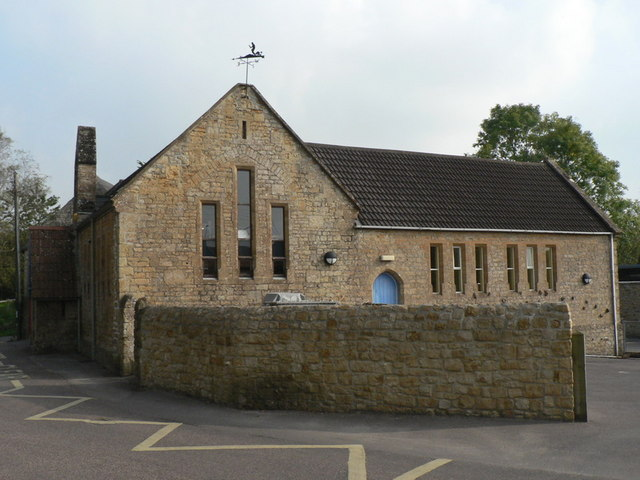
Loders CE VC Primary School

Loders is a village and civil parish in the English county of Dorset. It lies 2 miles (3.2 km) north-east of the town of Bridport. It is a linear village, sited in the valley of the small River Asker, between Waddon Hill and Boarsbarrow Hill. In the 2011 census the parish had a population of 518.

The village school was opened in 1869 on land owned by the Nepean family of Loders Court. It was originally called Lady Nepean's School.

The parish of Loders comprises three settlements. In the east is Uploders which has a public house, The Crown, and a chapel. To the west of Uploders and separated from it by a few fields is Yondover, where the village road crosses the River Asker. The village playing field and two farms are located here. West of Yondover and separated from it by the river and the disused railway line of the Bridport Railway branch line, is Lower Loders, generally known as just Loders. Lower Loders has a public house, The Loders Arms, a church, dedicated to St Mary Magdalen, a village hall, several farms, and a primary school, which celebrated its 150th anniversary in 2019.

In his book Portrait of Dorset, Ralph Wightman gave an agricultural assessment of Loders as having "more than its share of soil variations but most of them are good soils. The result is a village of fertile fields but with an amazing difference in levels."

== History ==
In 1086 Loders is mentioned in the Domesday Book as Lodres.

During the reign of Henry I, Baldwin de Redvers founded a seat of a Benedictine priory at Loders. The monks were reputedly the first to introduce cider-making into Dorset.

== Governance ==
Loders is in the Dorset unitary authority area. It is part of the Eggardon electoral ward, which elects one member to Dorset Council. Historically, Loders was in the Bridport Rural District from 1894 to 1974, and West Dorset district from 1974 to 2019.

For elections to the UK Parliament, Loders is part of the West Dorset constituency.

== In culture ==
Johnny Coppin's Westcountry Christmas album includes a song called Song for Loders, which mentions many places around the area, including Eggerton, Askerswell and Muckleford, amongst others.

When frost lies thick on Egerton
And every pool begins to freeze
From Muckleford to Nettle Coombe
And hills are hung with sparkling trees
Then to Loders we must go
Before the world is drowned in snow
