= Drackenorth =

- Drakenorth

Highest point
- Elevation: 221 m (725 ft)
- Prominence: 60 m (200 ft)
- Parent peak: Lewesdon Hill
- Listing: Tump
- Coordinates: 50°47′04″N 2°39′55″W

Geography
- Location: Dorset, England
- Parent range: Dorset Downs
- OS grid: SY532985
- Topo map: OS Landranger 194

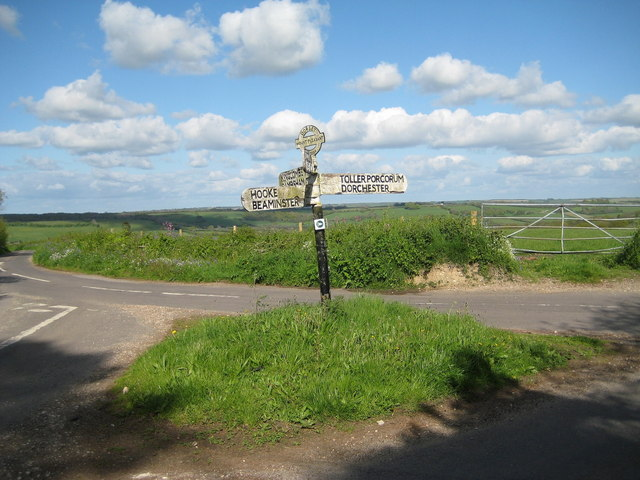
Five-way junction at Mount Pleasant on the northeastern spur of Drackenorth

Drackenorth or Drakenorth is a prominent hill, 221 metres (725 ft) high, 3 km NNE of Powerstock on the Jubilee Trail in the county of Dorset in southern England. Its prominence of 61 metres (200 ft) means it is listed as one of the Tumps. It is located within the Dorset Downs.

The summit is the highest point on a southwest-to-northeast running ridge and is relatively open with woods on the steep slopes to the south and east. The Jubilee Trail runs up the northeast spur and passes north of the summit before diving into Woodlands Coppice.
