= Bridport Railway =

Former railway branch line in Dorset, England

Overview
- Status: Closed

History
- Opened: 12 November 1857
- Closed: 1975
Route map
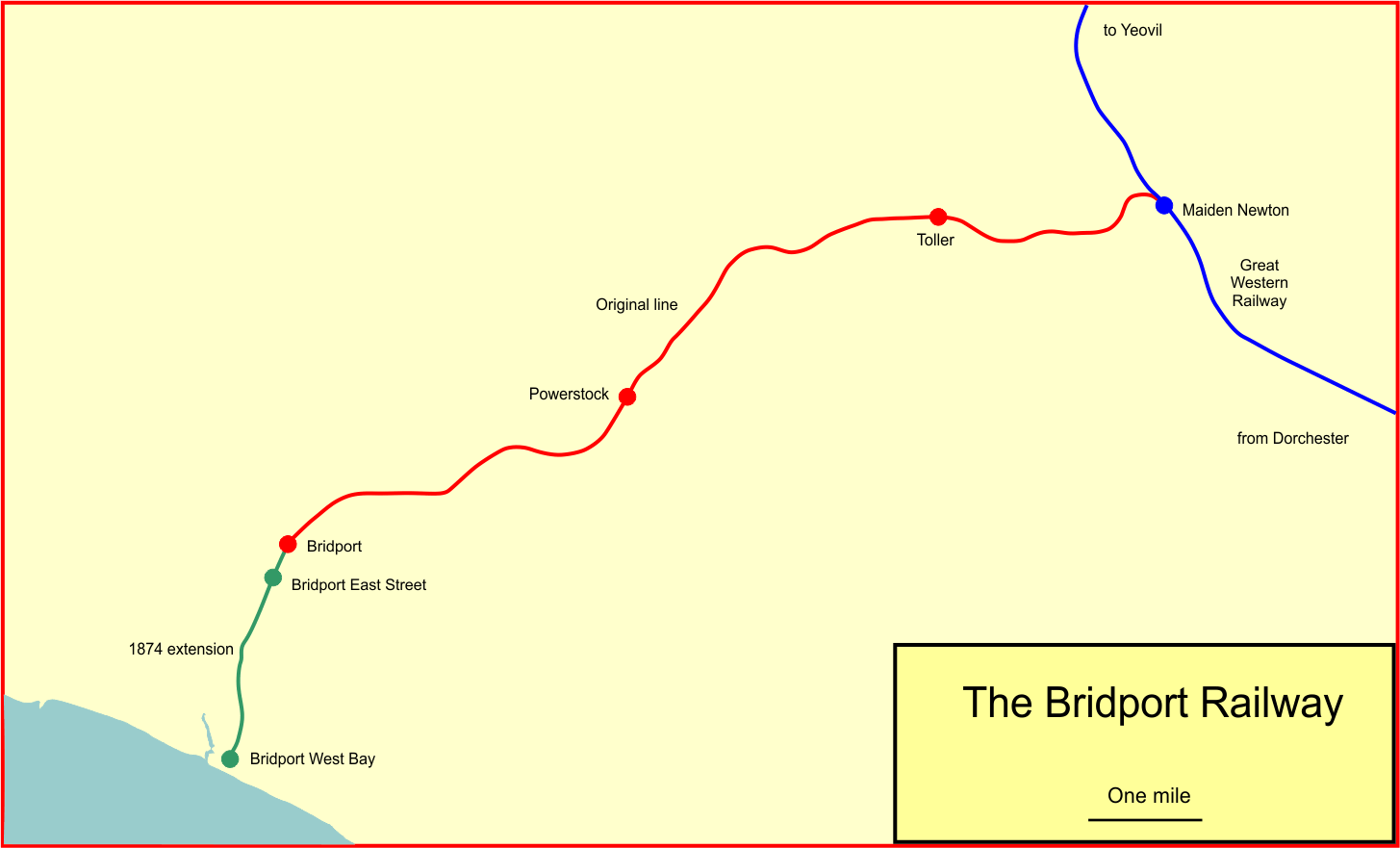
Map of the Bridport Railway with Bridport West Bay at bottom left and Maiden Newton upper right

The Bridport Railway was a railway branch line in the county of Dorset in England. It connected Bridport with the main line network at Maiden Newton, and opened on 12 November 1857. It was extended to West Bay in 1884, but the extension was not well used and it closed to passengers in 1930.

The remaining branch closed in 1975.

== History ==
During the 1840s a number of railway schemes had been proposed that would have put Bridport on a main line from London to Exeter. This included the Bridport and Exeter Railway, and schemes to extend the London and South Western Railway to Exeter from Dorchester. As late as 1853 there was a firm proposal to build such a line, but it fell through and the present-day route via Yeovil was adopted instead. Another scheme, authorised by the Wilts, Somerset and Weymouth Railway Act 1845 (8 & 9 Vict. c. liii), included a branch to Bridport, but this was never built. Dismayed at being abandoned by the larger railways, businessmen in Bridport observed that the Great Western Railway (GWR) was making plans to complete the partly built Wilts, Somerset and Weymouth Railway (WS&WR) from Castle Cary to Weymouth, and they resolved to build a branch line to connect their town to that line.

Bridport Railway Act 1855
- Act of Parliament
- Parliament of the United Kingdom
- Long title: An Act for constructing a Railway from Bridport to Maiden Newton, on the Wilts, Somerset, and Weymouth Railway, in the County of Dorset.
- Citation: 18 & 19 Vict. c. xi

Dates
- Royal assent: 5 May 1855

Text of statute as originally enacted

They obtained the Bridport Railway Act 1855 (18 & 19 Vict. c. xi) on 5 May 1855 to build a 9 1/4-mile (15 km) branch line to a junction with the GWR at Maiden Newton. Kenneth Mathieson of Dunfermline was contracted to build the railway and took a large number of shares in the company. Work started from a base at Loders on 19 June 1855.

The GWR line at Maiden Newton opened on 20 January 1857 and the Bridport Railway was ready before the end of the year. A special train for the directors and supporters of the railway ran on 16 October and the line opened to the public on 12 November 1857. There were celebrations a week later when a public holiday was declared in Bridport. Many people travelled on the train that day, as it was also the date of the Yeovil fair which could be reached on the GWR line.

It had an unusual type of broad gauge track described by Captain Tyler of the Her Majesty's Railway Inspectorate:

It has been laid with MacDonnell's patent permanent way, consisting of bridge rails weighing 51 lbs and longitudinal rolled iron sleepers weighing 60 lbs to the lineal yard, which are secured to each other by screw bolts and nuts. The gauge is preserved by angle iron cross-ties, nine feet apart; and a strip of wood has been inserted between the rails and sleepers to prevent rigidity. This description of permanent way has been already tried on the Bristol & Exeter Railway, and with such success as to induce the Company to lay down an additional portion of it.

The railway was worked by the GWR from the start. There was one intermediate station at Powerstock but Toller station was opened on 31 March 1862. The branch was converted to standard gauge in June 1874.

A new Bridport Railway Act 1879 was obtained to enable an extension from Bridport station to the harbour. It also envisaged the Bridport Railway operating its own trains over the GWR line to Dorchester although this never happened. Instead the GWR leased the line from 1 July 1881. Work started on the harbour extension in February 1883 and it opened on 31 March 1884.

Although profitable, the shareholders of the Bridport Railway Company decided to amalgamate with the GWR. This was sanctioned by the Great Western Railway Act 1901 (1 Edw. 7. c. cxxiii) of 26 July 1901.

=== Closure ===
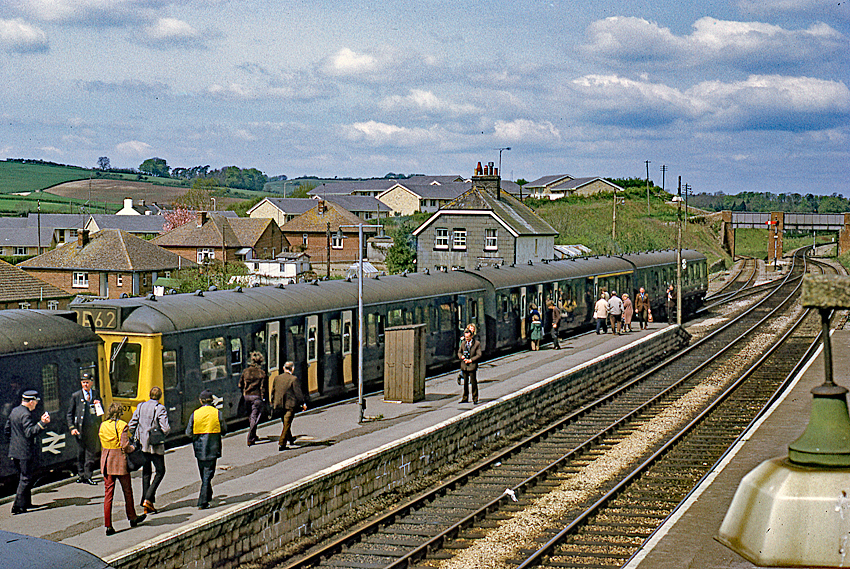
A Bridport train at Maiden Newton on the last day

The extension beyond Bridport closed to passengers from 22 September 1930 and to goods from 3 December 1962, although it was used for an emergency services exercise on 11 April 1964.

The line was marked for closure in the Beeching Report, but the narrow roads of the area and a subsidy from Dorset County Council kept it running. In 1971 the British Railways Board applied to close the line under the provisions of Section 56 of the Transport Act 1962, but the closure was not allowed to happen after a public enquiry in 1966. New proposals for closure came in 1972 but this time the public enquiry agreed with the plans and closure was scheduled for 1 January 1973 but was deferred . The last trains ran on 5 May 1975. With a surge in demand by local people and rail enthusiasts seeking a final trip, a three-carriage Class 117 diesel multiple unit train was used instead of the usual single carriage Class 121 during the final two days of operation. The Class 117 and Class 121 were used together to make a four-carriage train on the final day of operation.

A replacement bus service was provided to replace the trains. The first operator was Pearce's of Cattistock, but the contract changed to other operators several times.

== The route ==
Running through undulating topography, the route had to negotiate difficult terrain. It ran broadly west from Maiden Newton at first, climbing the valley of the River Hooke. After a summit west of Toller, the line turned south-west to find the valley of the River Asker and descend into Bridport. The short 1874 extension followed the same river to the sea at West Bay.

The route climbed from Maiden Newton to a summit west of Toller, near the 4 mile post, with a steepest gradient of 1 in 85. From there it fell at gradients between 1 in 50 and 1 in 62 to Bridport. The West Bay extension was mostly level but with short climbs up and down a 1 in 80 gradient.

=== Stations ===
Maiden Newton railway station opened on the GWR's Weymouth line on 20 January 1857 and became the junction for Bridport on 12 November that year. The main line had two platforms and the Bridport trains used a third at the north end of the station on the up side which was protected by a wooden train shed. There was no loop for the Bridport locomotive to run round its train, instead it propelled it back into a siding which was on a gradient. After the locomotive had uncoupled and moved clear, the carriages ran back into the platform using gravity under the control of the guard.

Toller opened on 31 March 1862. There was no shelter for the first 30 years. The building was destroyed in a fire on 12 October 1902. The GWR rebuilt the station in 1905 with a longer platform and a new wooden building with full facilities. There was a single siding which was made double-ended in 1905.The station building was moved to Totnes (Riverside) railway station on the South Devon Railway.

Powerstock was the only intermediate station when the original line opened. It had a single platform on the up side of the track. The station building included accommodation for the station master. There were two goods sidings behind the platform.

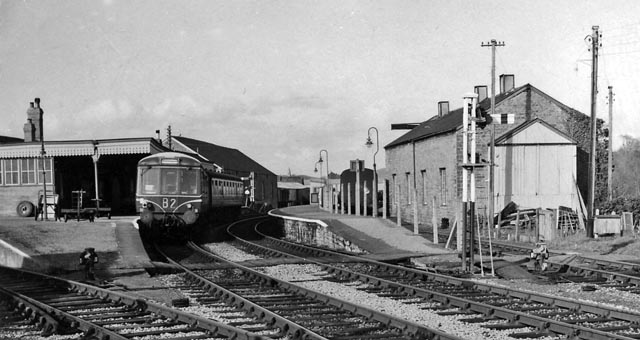
Bridport railway station

Bridport railway station, the original terminus, but was a long way from the village centre on the road to Bradpole. It had two platforms under a train shed. When the line was extended to West Bay, the alignment had to be altered so one platform line was removed to allow the other to be curved towards the new extension. Between 1887 and 1902 it was known as Bridport Bradpole Road station to distinguish it from the new stations at East Street and West Bay.

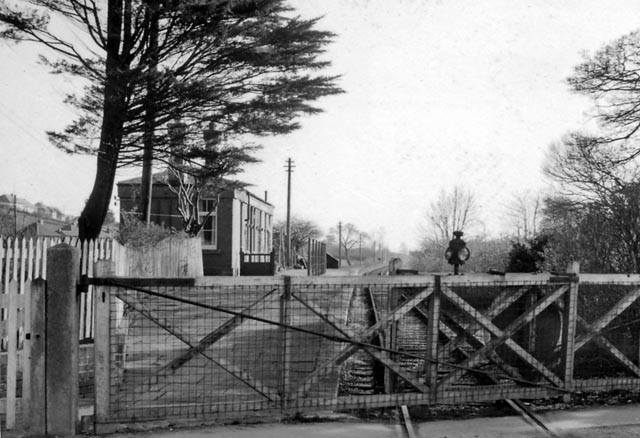
Bridport East Street Station

Bridport East Street railway station opened with the 1884 extension to West Bay at a location nearer the town centre than the old terminus on Bradpole Road. A thatched cottage adjacent was bought to provide limited station accommodation and a station master's house. A waiting room was erected on the platform in 1889 and the GWR provided a proper building to replace the cottage in 1904.

Bridport West Bay was the terminus of the 1884 extension. It was opened as Bridport Harbour station but was soon changed to Bridport West Bay to promote it as a holiday resort. The harbour itself had substantially declined in importance over the years, reducing to 10% of its former trade from 1830 to 1880 as a result of local industries declining, in part because of the arrival of the railway in the town.

== Passenger train service ==
The first timetable in November 1857 showed five trains each way on weekdays but none on Sundays. A new timetable was published for December 1857 which showed a reduction to just four trains. Trains took 25 minutes to get between Bridport and Maiden Newton, 5 minutes longer if they called at Powerstock. By 1859 there were two trains on Sundays and the weekday service had returned to five each day.

The 1895 timetable showed six passenger trains each way on weekdays. The first train is the 08:20 from Bridport Bradpole Road (the original terminus) to Maiden Newton; all subsequent trains ran throughout from Maiden Newton to West Bay, with a final short working from West Bay to Bridport only. On Saturdays this was extended to Maiden Newton, and returned as a non-stop Maiden Newton to Bridport train at 22:26 connecting out of a late train. The passenger service was capable of being operated by one train set. Most trains made a connection to or from the Yeovil direction at Maiden Newton. There were two return trips on Sundays.

By 1922 the timetable showed a more complicated pattern, with nine trains from Maiden Newton (three of them only running to Bridport station, now designated "Bridport for Lyme Regis"). The 13:50 from Maiden Newton had a connection from Paddington at 10:30, by a slip carriage on the Cornish Riviera Express, slipped at Westbury and then running to Weymouth, and making the connection at Maiden Newton. In the up direction, there were five trains from West Bay to Maiden Newton, and three from Bridport. In addition there was one short working from West Bay to Bridport at 16:52. At least two train sets would have been required to operate this service, and it is likely that some of the unbalanced trains were mixed passenger and goods.

Most trains were worked by diesel multiple units from 15 June 1959. These were Western Region three-car sets at first but later reduced to two-car Class 120s and eventually to one-car Class 121s. The timetable for the summer of 1962 showed 13 trains each weekday and six on Sundays, but the Sunday service was withdrawn from 10 September that year.

== The line today ==
The site of the bay platform can still be seen at Maiden Newton railway station and a footpath has been created along the trackbed for a short distance. Parts of the line in Bridport have been redeveloped as Sea Road.

The station building from Toller is now at Totnes (Riverside) railway station on the South Devon Railway. The station at Powerstock is a private bungalow.

Restoration of Bridport West Bay started in 1994 to turn it into a visitor centre for the harbour area. A short length of track was relaid by the Swanage Railway and two carriages positioned by the platform.
