= Thomas Canner =

English clergyman

Thomas Canner was Archdeacon of Dorset from 1542 to 1547.

Canner was educated at Magdalen College, Oxford, where he became a Fellow in 1517. He was also Provost of the Free Chapel of St. Nicholas sub Hamdenand Rector of Burton Bradstock.
