= Robert Buckle =

Robert Bentley Buckle (6 January 1802 – 16 September 1893) was the Archdeacon of Dorset from 1836 to 1862.

Buckle was born on 6 January 1802, the fourth son of Edward Buckle of Sowerby, Yorkshire. He was educated at Sidney Sussex College, Cambridge, graduating BA as 4th Wrangler in 1824. He was elected a Fellow of St John's in 1826. He was the Rector of Moreton, Dorset until 1836; and then of Upwey in the same county. He was also a Prebendary of Salisbury Cathedral.
