= Geoffrey Walton =

British Archdeacon (1934–2020)

Geoffrey Elmer Walton (19 February 1934 – 23 July 2020) was Archdeacon of Dorset from 1982 to 2000.

Born on 19 February 1934, he was educated at St John's College, Durham, and ordained in 1961. After a curacy in Warsop he was Vicar of Norwell from 1965 to 1969. He then became the Recruitment and Selection Secretary of the ACCM. He was Vicar of Holy Trinity, Weymouth from 1975 until his Archdeacon’s appointment. He was the Vicar of Witchampton from 1982 to 2000.

He died on 23 July 2020 at the age of 86.
