= Powerstock railway station =

Disused railway station in Dorset, England

Powerstock
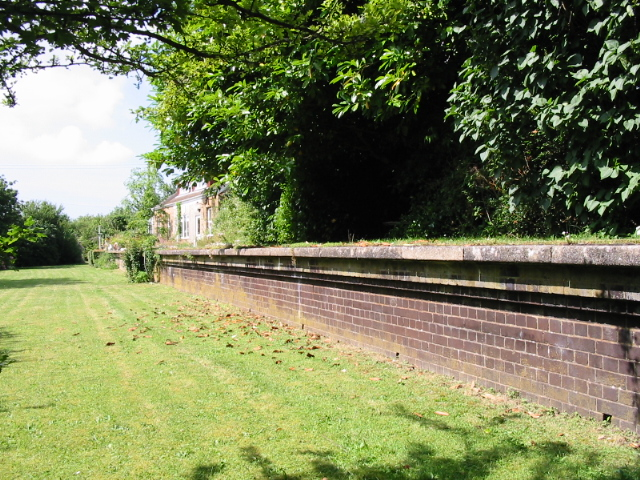
- Former railway station

General information
- Location: Powerstock, Dorset; England
- Coordinates: 50.7557°N 2.6792°W
- Platforms: 1

Other information
- Status: Disused

History
- Original company: Bridport Railway
- Pre-grouping: Great Western Railway
- Post-grouping: Great Western Railway

Key dates
- 12 November 1857: Opened as Poorstock
- 1860: Renamed Powerstock
- 5 May 1975: Closed
Location

Powerstock was a railway station on the Bridport Railway in the west of the English county of Dorset. The station served the villages of Powerstock, and Nettlecombe, which was nearer the railway. Opened with the branch on 12 November 1857, it was called Poorstock until 1860. Consisting of a single platform and bungalow style building, it had a siding. The station was host to a GWR camp coach from 1936 to 1939. Operated by the Great Western Railway, it was placed in the Western Region when the railways were nationalised in 1948.

The branch was threatened with closure in the Beeching report, but narrow roads in the area, unsuitable for buses, kept it open until 5 May 1975. The station was unstaffed in 1966. In its final years train services were usually operated by single carriage Class 121 diesel railcars.

== The site today ==
The station building can still be seen from the road. It was sold by British Railways in 1968 and was converted into a private home. The platform was still available for passenger use until 1975. After closure the trackbed and platform was sold to become part of the grounds of the house.

Preceding station	Disused railways	Following station
Toller; Line and station closed	Great Western Railway; Bridport Railway	Bridport; Line and station closed
