= River Asker =

River in Dorset, England

Asker
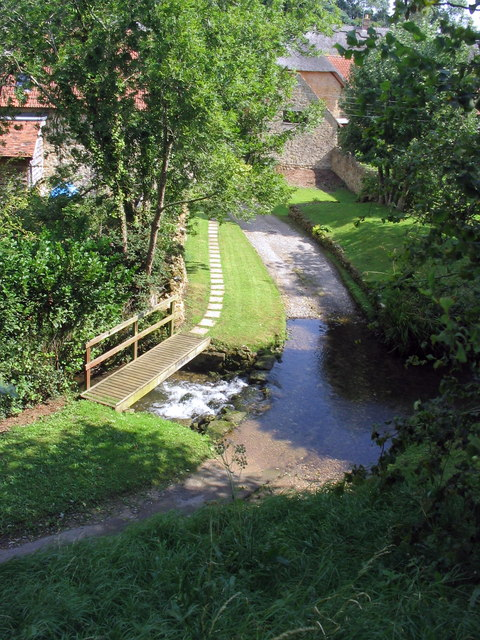
- A ford on the River Asker near Uploders

- Location within Dorset

Location
- Country: United Kingdom
- County: Dorset

Physical characteristics
- Source
  - location: Eggardon Hill, near Askerswell, Dorset
  - coordinates: 50°45′N 2°39′W
- Mouth
  - location: Bridport, Dorset
  - coordinates: 50°43′N 2°45′W
- Length: 13.378 km (8.313 mi)
- Basin size: 25.484 km^{2} (9.839 sq mi)

Basin features
- Tributaries
  - left: Mangerton Brook

The River Asker is a small river in Dorset, England. It rises on the chalk slopes of Eggardon Hill, approximately five miles (8 km) east of Bridport. It flows west-northwest through the villages of Askerswell to which it gives its name, Uploders, where many cottages have gardens backing onto the river, and Loders. Here it heads west towards Bradpole, where it is joined by the small Mangerton Brook flowing in from the north. It then flows southwest into Bridport, passing underneath the A3066 and B3162 roads in the town. In this section there are weirs and fish ladders. South of the B3162, between Bridport and Bothenhampton, the river also forms the western boundary of the Askers Meadow Nature Reserve, which was designated a Local Nature Reserve in 2004. The river then flows under the B3157 road and joins the River Brit beside Palmers Brewery in the south of the town.

== Water quality ==
The Environment Agency measure water quality of the river systems in England. Each is given an overall ecological status, which may be one of five levels: high, good, moderate, poor and bad. There are several components that are used to determine this, including biological status, which looks at the quantity and varieties of invertebrates, angiosperms and fish. Chemical status, which compares the concentrations of various chemicals against known safe concentrations, is rated good or fail.

Water quality of the River Asker in 2016:

Section	Ecological Status	Chemical Status	Overall Status	Length	Catchment	Channel
Asker	Poor	Good	Poor	11.796 km (7.330 mi)	23.699 km^{2} (9.150 sq mi)	
Mangerton Brook	Good	Good	Good	13.378 km (8.313 mi)	25.484 km^{2} (9.839 sq mi)	
