= Thomas Sanctuary =

Thomas Sanctuary (1814-1889) was Archdeacon of Dorset from 1862 until his death on 27 May 1889.

He was educated at Sherborne School and Exeter College, Oxford and ordained in 1845. He was Rector of Powerstock for over 40 years and a Canon Residentiary at Salisbury Cathedral from 1875.
