= Francis Sowter =

Archdeacon of Dorset from 1889 to 1901

Francis Briggs Sowter (died 10 September 1928) was Archdeacon of Dorset from 1889 to 1901.

== Biography ==
Born in 1852, he was educated at Corpus Christi College, Cambridge, and ordained in 1876. After a curacy at Kegworth he held incumbencies in Corscombe, Weymouth, Fleet and Dorchester. He was appointed Archdeacon of Dorset in 1889, serving as such until his resignation due to ill-health in December 1901. He was later appointed Canon.

Sowter died on 10 September 1928.
