= West Bay Methodist Church =

Church in West Bay, Dorset, England

Coordinates: 50.8449°N 2.8336°W

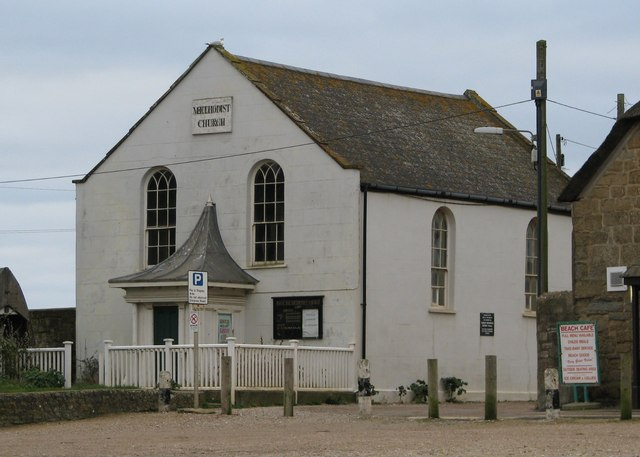
The West Bay Methodist Chapel in 2008.

West Bay Methodist Church is a former Methodist chapel at West Bay, west Dorset, England. Opened in 1849, the chapel was locally known as "the chapel on the beach". It closed in 2007 and was transformed into the West Bay Discovery Centre in 2018. The former chapel has been Grade II listed since 1975.

== History ==
Prior to the construction of the church, the West Bay Wesleyan Society, which had formed in 1828, held services and meeting at a local dwelling. As the congregation grew, a Methodist church was built in 1849 by Messrs John Cox and Son, close to West Bay harbour and Chesil Beach. It opened on 4 December 1849 and continued to serve the local community until May 2007, with the exception of a period of closure during World War II.

Following the chapel's disuse, West Dorset District Council later sold the chapel to the Bridport Area Development Trust for £1 in 2012. Plans were then created for its conversion into a visitor centre, with planning permission being sought and granted in 2015. Funding from the Coastal Communities Fund was received in 2017 and the restoration and alteration work was carried out in 2018 by R&C Building Conservation of Shaftesbury. The West Bay Discovery Centre opened in August 2018.
