= Henry Hall (priest) =

Henry Hall (1734–1815) was Archdeacon of Dorset from 1801 until his death on 29 May 1815.

Hall was educated at St John's College, Oxford. He was also Rector of Child Okeford. Hall's library was sold in its entirety at auction in London by Leigh & Sotheby on 28 March 1814 (and nine following days); a copy of the catalogue is held at Cambridge University Library (shelfmark Munby.c.162(11)).
