= St John's Church, West Bay =

Church in Dorset, England

St John's Church
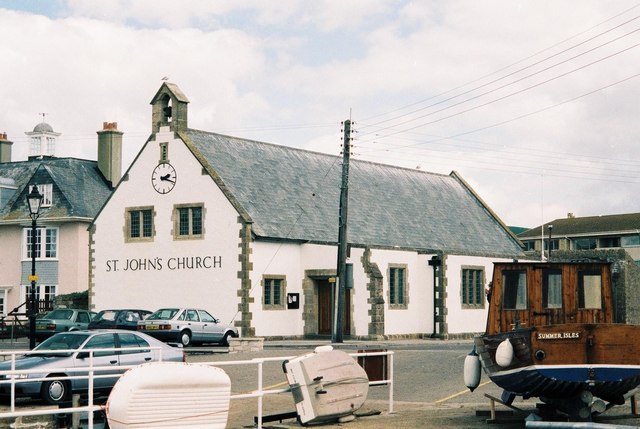
- St John's Church

Religion
- Affiliation: Church of England
- Ecclesiastical or organizational status: Active

Location
- Location: West Bay, Dorset, England
- Interactive map of St John's Church
- Coordinates: 50.7110°N 2.7609°W

Architecture
- Architect: William Henry Randoll Blacking
- Type: Church
- Completed: 1939

St John's Church is a Church of England church in West Bay, Dorset, England. It was built in 1935–39 to the designs of William Henry Randoll Blacking and has been a Grade II listed building since 1975.

== History ==
St John's was built as a chapel of ease to the parish church of St Mary's, Bridport. Prior to its construction, Church of England services had been held in a cottage converted in 1862 into a mission room dedicated to St Andrew. Fundraising began in 1923 to raise £3,000 for a new church to replace the existing mission chapel, which was considered too small, particularly during the summer seasons when West Bay received a large influx of visitors.

William Henry Randoll Blacking was commissioned to design the church in 1926. The south aisle was the first section to be constructed, with the foundation stone laid by the Bishop of Salisbury, Rev. St Clair Donaldson, on 28 May 1935. It was opened on 10 November 1935 and used for services until the church's nave was built. The completed church was dedicated on 21 May 1939 by the Bishop of Salisbury, Rev. Neville Lovett. At the time, the church had cost over £5,000, with £1,500 still to be raised.

In 2014, English Heritage added the church to their Heritage at Risk Register, primarily due to the poor condition of its roofs, resulting in dampness and leakage. In 2018, it was reported that although further work is required, conditions have approved, with all roofs having been repaired. The church still has "some areas of damp" and its lead windows are in need of repair.

== Architecture ==
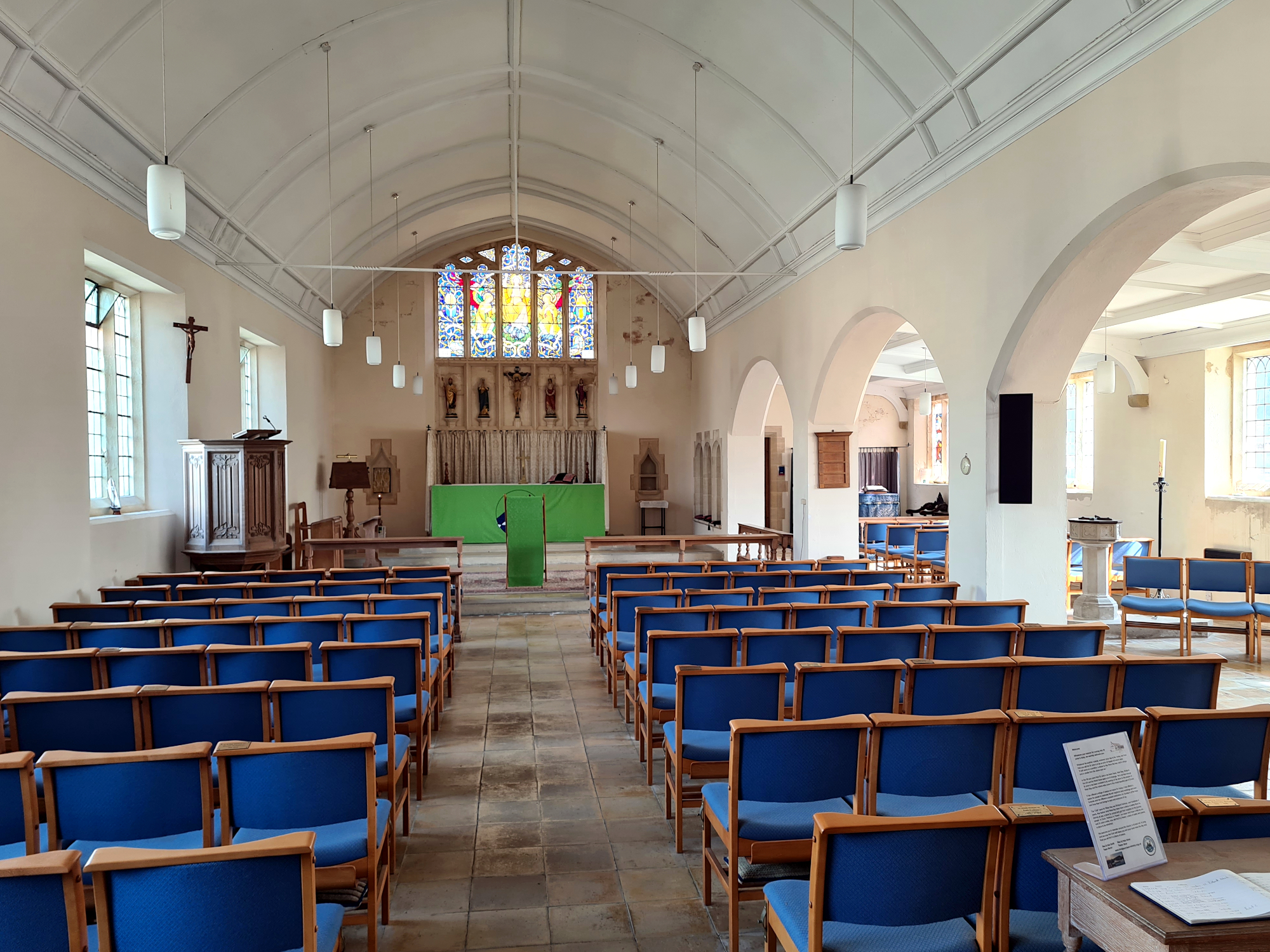
The interior of St John's Church.

St John's, able to accommodate 300 persons, is built of rendered stone, with limestone dressings and slate roofs. The western gable of the church features a bellcote, with a clock face on the wall below. The interior is made up of a five-bay nave, a three-bay south aisle with porch and vestries. Some of the church's furnishings are of limed oak, including the lectern, pulpit and stalls. The font is of Victorian origin and relocated to the church from the mission chapel. The stained glass of the east window was created by Christopher Webb in 1959 and includes an illustration of Portland Bill Lighthouse and a sailing vessel. Historic England consider the church "elegant and simple" and "styled in traditional forms informed by the Arts and Crafts movement".
