= Toller railway station =

Former railway station in Dorset, England

Coordinates: 50.7792°N 2.6223°W

Toller
- The former Toller station building now rebuilt at Totnes

General information
- Location: Toller Porcorum, Dorset; England
- Platforms: 1

Other information
- Status: Disused

History
- Original company: Bridport Railway
- Post-grouping: Great Western Railway

Key dates
- 31 March 1862: Opened
- 5 May 1975: Closed
Location

Toller was a railway station on the Bridport Railway in the west of the English county of Dorset. The station served the village of Toller Porcorum and the surrounding, deeply rural, area. Opened on 31 March 1862, five years after the branch, it consisted of a single platform and a modest wooden building. A loop, later reduced to a siding, offered accommodation for goods traffic until 1960.

== History ==
Opened by the Bridport Railway, but operated from the outset by the Great Western Railway, the station was initially placed in the Western Region when the railways were nationalised in 1948. It then passed to the Southern Region (1950-62), reverting to the Western Region in 1963.

The branch was threatened with closure in the Beeching report of March 1963, but narrow roads in the area, unsuitable for buses, kept it open until 5 May 1975. In its final years, trains were normally formed of a single-carriage Class 121 diesel railcar.

== The site today ==
The platform can still be seen from the overbridge although the building was moved to Totnes on the South Devon Railway, a heritage line.

Preceding station	Disused railways	Following station
Maiden Newton; Heart of Wessex Line	Great Western Railway; Bridport Railway	Powerstock; Line and station closed
