= Bridport West Bay railway station =

Disused railway station in Dorset, England

Coordinates: 50.7111°N 2.7588°W

Bridport West Bay
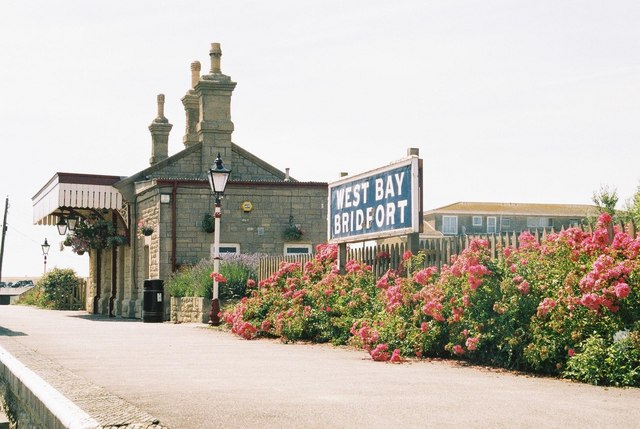
- Former railway station

General information
- Location: Bridport, Dorset; England
- Grid reference: SY465904
- Platforms: 1

Other information
- Status: Disused

History
- Pre-grouping: Bridport Railway; GWR
- Post-grouping: GWR; Western Region of British Railways

Key dates
- 31 March 1884: Opened
- 22 September 1930: Closed for passengers
- 3 December 1962: closed for freight traffic
Location

West Bay railway station was the terminus of the Bridport Railway in western Dorset, England.

== History ==
In 1879, the Great Western Railway, which held the operating license for the original Bridport Railway (which ran as far as Bridport town), decided to extend the railway to Bridport Harbour. Construction began in 1883, and the line opened on 31 March 1884. It was closed briefly between 1916 and 1919; for 3 months in 1921; and for two weeks in 1924. The station was named West Bay by the GWR to encourage holiday traffic. The line between West Bay and Bridport closed to passengers in 1930 and operated for goods services only until its final closure in 1962. Subsequently an enthusiasts special ran on 25 August 1963.

Preceding station	Disused railways	Following station
East Street (Bridport); Line and station closed	Great Western Railway; Bridport Railway	Terminus

== The site today ==
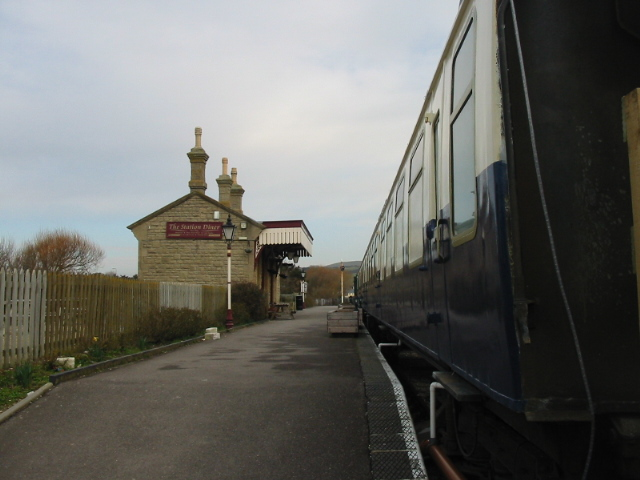
The station in use as a cafe

After many years as the office of a boat yard, in 1995 the station was restored with a short length of track at the platform.

The station building, along with two refurbished carriages, is now operating as Platform Restaurant.

From West Bay, a section of the former track bed can now be walked into Bridport.

== Bibliography ==
- Butt, R. V. J. (October 1995). The Directory of Railway Stations: details every public and private passenger station, halt, platform and stopping place, past and present (1st ed.). Sparkford: Patrick Stephens Ltd. ISBN 978-1-85260-508-7. OCLC 60251199. OL 11956311M.
- Jowett, Alan (2000). Jowett's Nationalised Railway Atlas (1st ed.). Penryn, Cornwall: Atlantic Transport Publishers. ISBN 978-0-906899-99-1. OCLC 228266687.
- Jowett, Alan (March 1989). Jowett's Railway Atlas of Great Britain and Ireland: From Pre-Grouping to the Present Day (1st ed.). Sparkford: Patrick Stephens Ltd. ISBN 978-1-85260-086-0. OCLC 22311137.
- Quick, Michael (2023). Railway Passenger Stations in Great Britain: A Chronology (PDF) (5th ed.). London: Railway and Canal Historical Society.
