= Maiden Newton railway station =

Railway station in Dorset, England

Maiden Newton
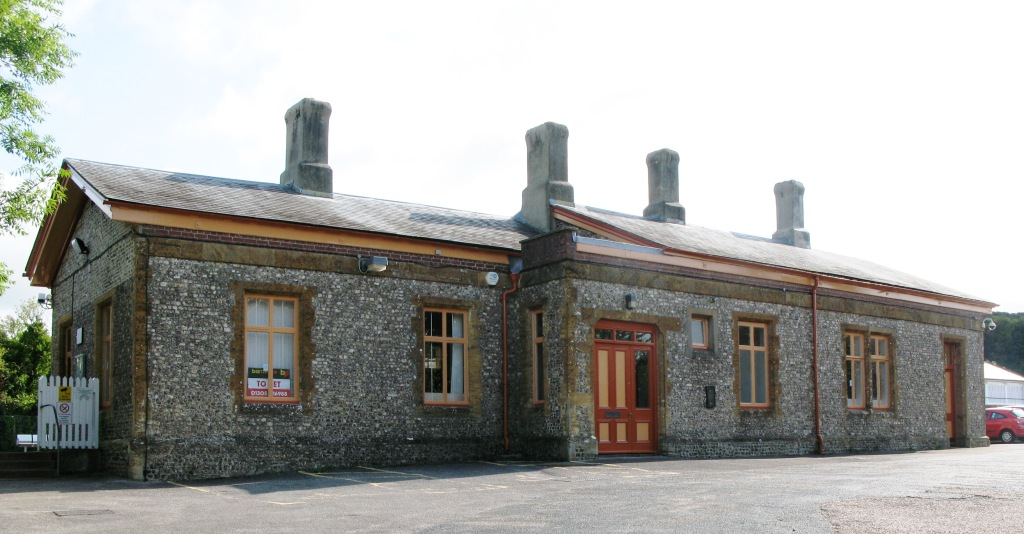

General information
- Location: Maiden Newton, Dorset; England
- Coordinates: 50.780°N 2.569°W
- Grid reference: SY599979
- Manager: Great Western Railway
- Platforms: 2

Other information
- Station code: MDN
- Classification: DfT category F1

History
- Original company: Great Western Railway

Key dates
- 20 January 1857: Opened
- 1975: Bridport branch closed

Passengers
- 2021/22: ▲14,818
- 2022/23: ▲19,566
- 2023/24: ▲21,672
- 2024/25: ▲21,882
- 2025/26: ▲27,046

Listed Building – Grade II
- Feature: Maiden Newton Station
- Designated: 26 April 1999
- Reference no.: 1386820
Location
Notes
- Passenger statistics from the Office of Rail and Road

Maiden Newton railway station is a railway station serving the village of Maiden Newton in Dorset, England. The station is located on the Heart of Wessex Line at milepost 154 1/4.

== History ==
Opened on 20 January 1857 by the Great Western Railway with the section of their route from Yeovil Pen Mill to Weymouth. This completed the Wilts, Somerset and Weymouth line from Chippenham, the first part of which had opened in 1848.

The station consisted of two platforms with a flint station building and goods shed at the south end. A signal box was added later – it was closed in the summer of 1988, when the "no signalman token system" was introduced between Maiden Newton and Yeovil. From 1857 to 1975 the station was the junction for the Bridport Railway and an extra bay platform was added at the north end of the station for these trains. This can still be seen at the west end of the station and this end of the trackbed is a footpath and cycleway.

The station was listed at Grade II in 1999. The main station building was built for the opening of the station and although in the style of Isambard Kingdom Brunel is most likely to designs by his assistant Robert Pearson Brereton. It is constructed of flint with Hamstone dressings and an artificial slate roof. The other buildings within the listing include a smaller shelter with Welsh slate roof, and the footbridge of reinforced concrete installed in the 1950s by the Western Region of British Railways.

Preceding station	Historical railways	Following station
Cattistock	Wilts, Somerset and Weymouth Railway	Grimstone and Frampton
Terminus	Bridport Railway	Toller

== Description ==
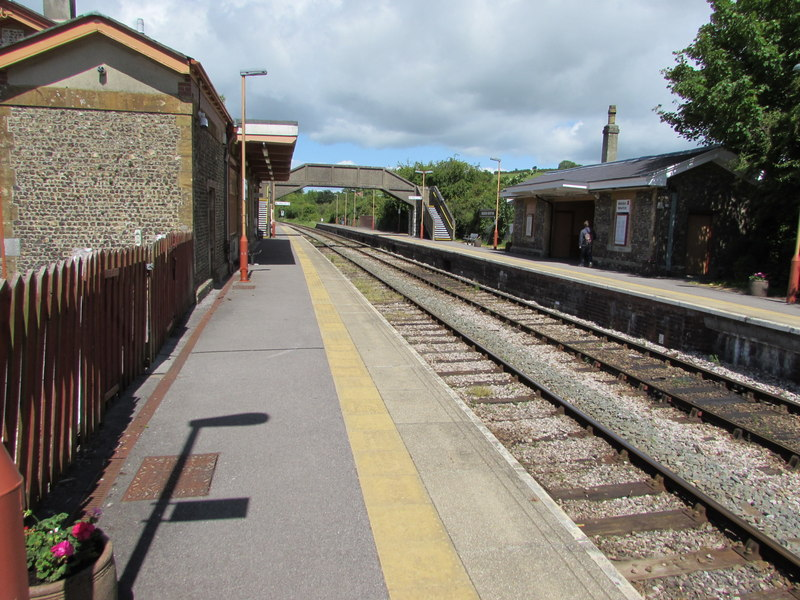
Looking north

Maiden Newton is 154.12 miles (248.03 km; 154.12 mi) from the zero point at London Paddington, measured via Swindon and Westbury.

The station retains two platforms as it is a passing place on the single line between Dorchester West and Yeovil Pen Mill. The entrance is on the northbound platform, the side closest to the village. Access to the southbound platform is normally by the footbridge but there is a level crossing at the south end of the station for passengers who are unable to use the bridge.

The station building survives but is no longer used by the railway.

== Signalling ==
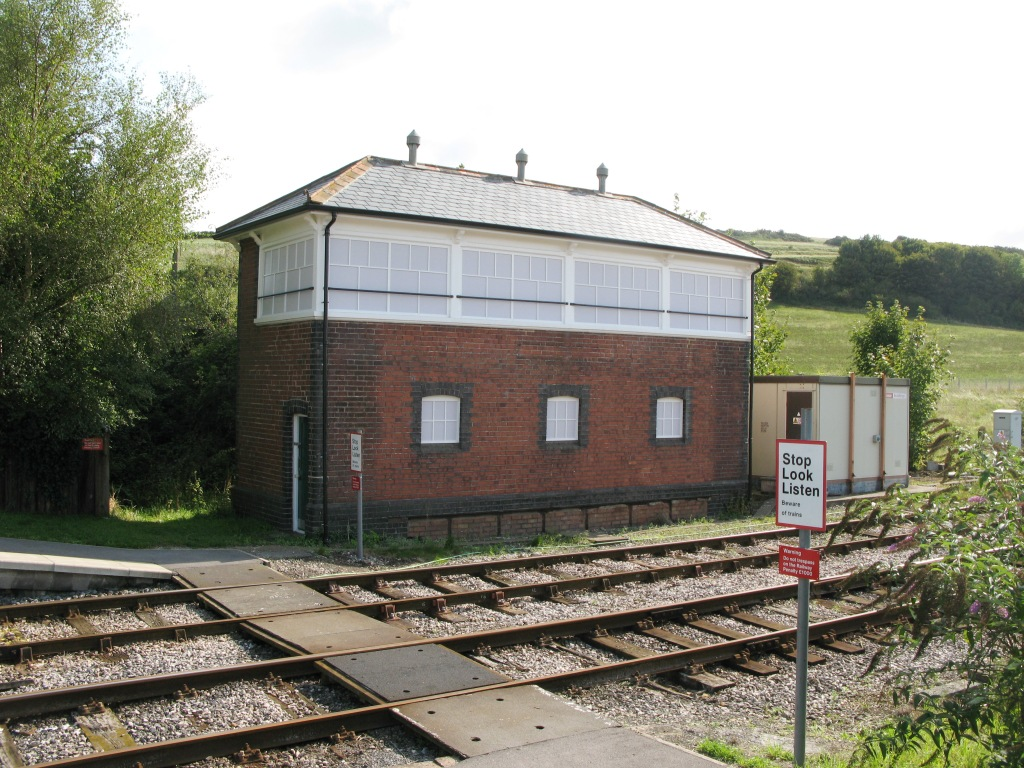
The old signal box

The electric key token instrument for the block section to Yeovil are now operated by the train crew under the supervision of the signal operator based at Yeovil Pen Mill. The block section to Dorchester West is operated under the "tokenless single line" principle with track circuiting.

== Services ==
Great Western Railway operate services from Great Malvern, Worcester Shrub Hill, Gloucester and Bristol Temple Meads to Weymouth.

Preceding station	National Rail	Following station
Chetnole	Great Western Railway (Heart of Wessex Line)	Dorchester West

== Cultural impact ==
In 1981 the Station was used as the fictional Marlbury Station for the filming of an episode of To the Manor Born. In the episode titled Station Closing, Audrey Forbes-Hamilton (Penelope Keith) leads a campaign to save the station from closure whilst Richard De Vere (Peter Bowles) wants to turn it into a supermarket.
