= Richard Sharp (priest) =

Richard Lloyd Sharp was Archdeacon of Dorset from 1975 to 1982.

Born on 30 November 1916, he was educated at Brighton Hove & Sussex Grammar School, and ordained in 1941. After a curacy at Holy Trinity, Weymouth he held incumbencies in Portland, Wootton Bassett and Salisbury before returning to his first post as Vicar.

He died on 4 July 1982.
