= Okes Parish =

William Okes Parish (26 June 1859 – 7 April 1940) was an Anglican cleric who was Archdeacon of Dorset from 1929 to 1936.

Parish was born in Cherry Hinton, Cambridgeshire, into an ecclesiastical family, the elder son of The Reverend William Samuel Parish, MA, Fellow of Peterhouse He was educated at Peterhouse, Cambridge and ordained in 1884. He was Vicar of Longfleet from 1886 to 1929; Rural Dean of Poole from 1893 to 1929; and a Canon Residentiary of Salisbury Cathedral from 1929 to 1936. He was also a Chaplain to the Dorset Regiment.

He died on 7 April 1940.
