= West Compton, Dorset =

Hamlet and civil parish in Dorset, England

Coordinates: 50.746°N 2.618°W

West Compton
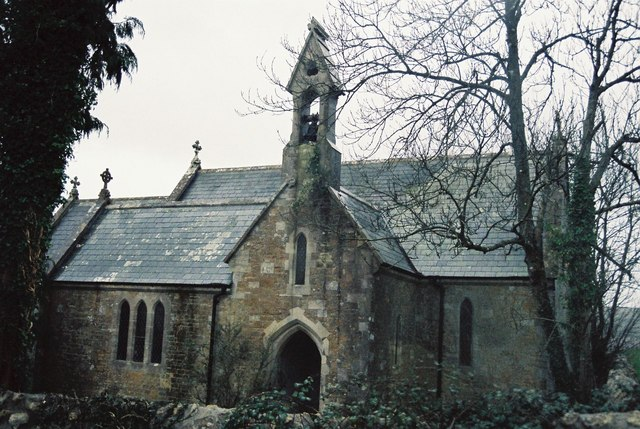
- Parish church of St Michael

- Location within Dorset
- Population: 24 (2013 estimate)
- OS grid reference: SY562943
- Unitary authority: Dorset
- Ceremonial county: Dorset
- Region: South West
- Country: England
- Sovereign state: United Kingdom
- Post town: Dorchester
- Postcode district: DT2
- Police: Dorset
- Fire: Dorset and Wiltshire
- Ambulance: South Western
- UK Parliament: West Dorset

West Compton is a hamlet and civil parish in the county of Dorset, England. It lies in western Dorset, about 7 miles to the east of the town of Bridport. The county town of Dorchester lies about 9 miles east-southeast. The A35 trunk road, which runs between these two towns, is about 2 miles to the south. Dorset County Council estimate that in 2013 the parish had a population of 24.

The hamlet is sited 160 metres above sea-level at the head of a small valley, formed by a tributary of the River Frome. The surrounding chalk hills are part of the westerly edge of the Dorset Downs, which here reach a height of 252 metres at Eggardon Hill, just over a mile to the west.
