= Archdeacon of Dorset =

Anglican ecclesiastical position

The archdeacon of Dorset is a senior ecclesiastical officer within the Diocese of Salisbury, England. The archdeacon is responsible for the disciplinary supervision of the clergy within the four area deaneries: Purbeck, Poole, Wimborne, and Milton and Blandford.

== History ==
The role of archdeacons within the diocese of Salisbury originated around the time of the Norman Conquest; the first recorded archdeacon titled Archdeacon of Dorset occurs as an officer of that diocese from the mid-12th century. The archdeaconry was transferred to the diocese of Bristol upon its creation on 4 June 1542, and later returned to Salisbury diocese by Order in Council on 7 October 1836 upon the abolition of Bristol diocese.

In 1916, the Archdeaconry of Sherborne was created, which was divided out of the historic archdeaconry of Dorset.

The post is currently vacant following Antony MacRow-Wood's retirement.

== List of archdeacons ==
Some archdeacons without territorial titles are recorded from around the time of the Norman Conquest; see Archdeacon of Salisbury.

=== High Medieval ===
- bef. 1139–aft. 1173: Adelelm (also Dean of Lincoln from bef. 1145)
- bef. 1184–aft. 1193: William
- bef. 1196–aft. 1198: Richard
- Ranulph son of Robert (disputed)
- bef. 1200–aft. 1214 (res.): Adam
- bef. 1222–aft. 1225: Herbert
- bef. 1226–aft. 1241: Humphrey
- bef. 1245–aft. 1255: Gerard de Bingham
- bef. 1258–aft. 1258: Giordano Pironti
- c. 1262 (res.): Simon of Bridport
- bef. 1271–aft. 1271: John
- ?–bef. 1275 (res.): Gerard de Grandson

Antony Bek was provided but did not take office.

- bef. 1275–aft. 1280 (res.): Thomas Bek
- bef. 1281–1284 (res.): Henry Brandeston (previously Archdeacon of Wilts; became Dean of Salibury)
- bef. 1287–1297 (d.): William de la Wyle
- 1297–aft. 1316 (d.): Henry de Bluntesdon

=== Late Medieval ===
- 29 September 1316–bef. 1321: Peter de Periton
- 3 January 1321–aft. 1339: Thomas de Hotoft
- 28 January 1340–bef. 1346 (d.): John de Kirkeby
- bef. 1347–aft. 1352: Bertrand Cardinal de Deucio (Cardinal-priest

of San Marco)

- bef. 1373–1378 (res.): Robert Cardinal de Geneva (Cardinal-priest

of Santi XII Apostoli; afterwards Pope at Avignon)

- 18 November 1378–?: Thomas Pays
- bef. 1380–bef. 1386: Niccolò Cardinal Caracciolo Moschino (Cardinal-priest

of San Ciriaco alle Terme Diocleziane)

- 7 January 1386–bef. 1388: Ralph Erghum (possibly the Bishop of Salisbury)
- 13 September 1388–aft. 1390: Robert Ragenhull
- Disputed period:
  - bef. 1396–bef. 1397 (d.): Adam Cardinal Easton (Cardinal-priest

of Santa Cecilia in Trastevere; Papal grant)

  - bef. 1397–bef. 1397 (d.): Michael Cergeaux (Royal grant)
  - 1397: Walter Medford (Royal grant)
  - 1397–30 June 1398 (deprived): Nicholas Bubwith (Papal grant)
  - 3 September 1397 – 1400: Henry Chichele (Bishop's man)
- 9 July 1400 – 1406 (res.): Nicholas Bubwith (again)
- 11 December 1406 – 22 February 1437 (exch.): John Mackworth
- 22 February 1437–bef. 1440 (d.): John Hody (possibly the justice)
- 19 July 1440–bef. 1447 (d.): John Stopyndon
- 25 May 1447–bef. 1449 (d.): Robert Aiscough
- 14 February 1449–bef. 1486 (d.): William Aiscough
- 25 June 1486–bef. 1514 (res.): Robert Langton
- 20 May 1514 – 1523 (res.): Richard Pace
- 17 January 1523 – 1530 (res.): John Stokesley
- 20 December 1530–bef. 1533 (d.): William Bennet
- 25 November 1533 – 1535 (res.) Edward Foxe
- bef. 1539–bef. 1542 (res.): John Skypp (also Bishop of Hereford from 1539)

=== Early modern ===
- 1542–aft. 1547: Thomas Canner
- 1551–1572 (d.): John Cotterell
- 1572–aft. 1584: Henry Tynchiner
- 1572–1575 (rem.): James Proctor (disputed)
- ?–bef. 1621 (d.): Edward Wickham
- 1621–bef. 1654 (d.): Richard Fitzherbert
- 1660–bef. 1671 (d.): Richard Meredith
- 16 September 1671 – 5 March 1683 (d.): Ralph Ironside
- 25 March 1683–bef. 1698 (d.): The Hon John Feilding
- 1698–bef. 1733 (d.): Robert Cooper
- 7 May 1733–bef. 1762 (d.): Edward Hammond
- 21 May 1762 – 15 November 1780 (d.): John Walker
- 11 November 1780 – 19 April 1801 (res.): Watson Hand
- 2 May 1801 – 29 May 1815 (d.): Henry Hall
- 3 June 1815 – 13 November 1835 (d.): William England
- 9 January 1836 – 13 January 1862 (res.): Robert Buckle

=== Late modern ===
- 1862–1889: Thomas Sanctuary
- 1889–1901 (res.): Francis Sowter
- 1902–1927 (ret.): Charles Dundas
- 1927–1929 (d.): Eric Bodington
- 1929–7 April 1940 (d.): Okes Parish
- 1940–22 June 1947 (d.): Harold Rodgers
- 1948–1955: Lancelot Addison
- 1955–1974 (ret.): Edward Seagar (afterwards archdeacon emeritus)
- 1975–1982 (ret.): Richard Sharp (afterwards archdeacon emeritus)
- 1982–2000 (ret.): Geoffrey Walton (afterwards archdeacon emeritus)
- 2000–2009 (res.): Alistair Magowan
- 2009–2010: Patrick Evans (Acting)
- 18 April 2010 – 14 February 2015 (res.): Stephen Waine
- 24 June 2015 – June 2025 (ret.): Antony MacRow-Wood (retired June 2025)

== Sources ==
- Greenway, Diana E. (1991), Fasti Ecclesiae Anglicanae 1066–1300, vol. 4, pp. 25–28
- Horn, Joyce M. (1962), Fasti Ecclesiae Anglicanae 1300–1541, vol. 3, pp. 7–9
- Horn, Joyce M. (1996), Fasti Ecclesiae Anglicanae 1541–1857, vol. 8, pp. 19–20
