= Lancelot Addison (Archdeacon of Dorset) =

Lancelot Farquharson Addison (26 March 1886 – 18 November 1955) was an Anglican priest who was archdeacon of Dorset from 1948 to 1955.

He was born in Keighley, Yorkshire to James Salmon Addison, the then-vicar of Holy Trinity Church in Keighley; and Georgiana Harrison Addison. He was educated at Leeds Grammar School. After a year of studying at University College, Durham, Addison continued his education at Lichfield Theological College. He was ordained in 1911. Following curacies in Stafford, King's Cross and Brighouse he was vicar of St Thomas, Halifax and then Cranborne before his archdeacon's appointment. He was appointed treasurer of Salisbury Cathedral shortly before his death in November 1955, aged 69.

Church of England titles
Preceded by Harold Nickinson Rodgers	Archdeacon of Dorset; 1948 –1955	Succeeded by Edward Leslie Seagar
