= Netherbury =

Village in Dorset, England

Coordinates: 50.7908°N 2.7535°W

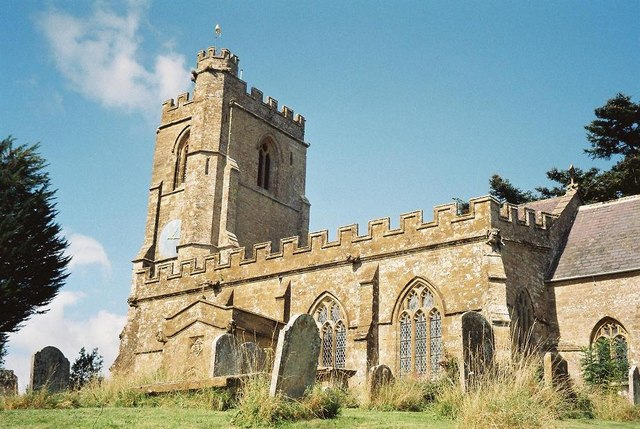
- Parish church of St Mary

- Location within Dorset
- Population: 1,314
- OS grid reference: SY470993
- Unitary authority: Dorset
- Ceremonial county: Dorset
- Region: South West
- Country: England
- Sovereign state: United Kingdom
- Post town: BRIDPORT
- Postcode district: DT6
- Police: Dorset
- Fire: Dorset and Wiltshire
- Ambulance: South Western
- UK Parliament: West Dorset

Netherbury is a village and civil parish in the English county of Dorset. It lies within the Dorset Council administrative area, by the small River Brit, 1.5 miles (2.4 km) south of Beaminster and 4 miles (6.4 km) north of Bridport. The A3066 road connecting those towns lies 0.5 miles to the east.

== Population ==
In the 2011 census the parish, including the villages of Melplash and Salway Ash, and the small settlements of Atrim, Oxbridge, Waytown, North and South Bowood, Wooth, Silkhay, Mangerton, Whitecross, Filford, Dottery, Hincknowle and Loscombe, had a population of 1,314. Netherbury is within an electoral ward that bears its name and stretches south to the edge of Bridport. The ward population was 2,080.

== Facilities ==
Along with domestic buildings, Netherbury village has a church, a village hall, and a play park. The church has a Norman font, a 15th-century altar tomb and a 16th-century pulpit. The hills surrounding the village show examples of strip lynchets.

The River Brit used to serve several mills to process the flax used in Bridport's rope-making industry. In Netherbury, the river is crossed by a 17th-century bridge with three dissimilar arches: a larger, round eastern arch accommodated the millrace.

The novelist Mary Anna Needell lived in Netherbury with her family in the 1880s. Kingsland House was the birthplace of Vice-Admiral Sir Samuel Hood, 1st Baronet (1762–1814).

== See also ==
- River Cottage
