= River Brit =

River in west Dorset, England

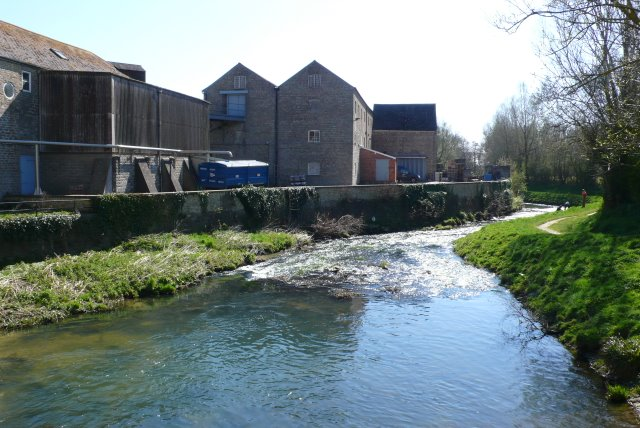
- River Brit at Palmers Brewery, Bridport

- Location within Dorset

Location
- Country: England
- County: Dorset
- District: Dorset
- Towns and villages: West Bay, Bridport, Netherbury, Beaminster

Physical characteristics
- Source: Beaminster
  - location: Dorset, England
- Mouth
  - location: West Bay, Dorset, England
  - coordinates: 50.7089°N 2.7638°W
- Length: 15.17 km (9.43 mi)
- Discharge
  - location: West Bay

Basin features
- Tributaries
  - left: River Asker
  - right: River Simene

The River Brit is a river in west Dorset in south-west England, which rises just to the north of Beaminster. It then flows south to Netherbury and Bridport, where it is joined by tributaries: the River Simene and River Asker. South of Bridport, it reaches Lyme Bay on the English Channel coast, at West Bay. The Brit has a length of 9.43 miles (15.17 km).

== Name ==
The river takes its name from the town of Bridport, which in turn derives from the River Bride, the neighbouring drainage basin to the east, which has connections with Bridport's early history. Before the establishment of Bridport, the Brit was named the River Wooth. This is still reflected in the names of settlements, such as Wooth Manor and Camesworth.

== Natural history ==
The river has Indian balsam plants on its banks. It was previously polluted by the local hemp and flax industries and by sewage discharges, but the environment of the river has improved in recent years. Fish species found include the stone loach, brown trout and minnows. These in turn support wildlife such as kingfishers and otters. Conditions are healthy enough to support the parr of salmon and sea trout, which live in the river for two to five years before turning into smolt and returning to the sea; fish passes have been installed to facilitate this.
