= Powerstock =

Village and civil parish in Dorset, England

Coordinates: 50.7635°N 2.6865°W

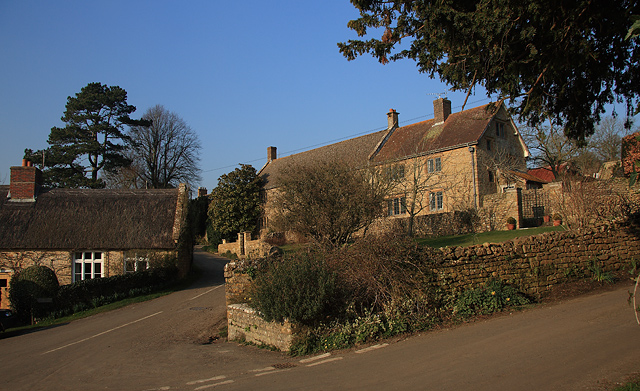
- Powerstock

- Location within Dorset
- Population: 290
- OS grid reference: SY517962
- Unitary authority: Dorset
- Ceremonial county: Dorset
- Region: South West
- Country: England
- Sovereign state: United Kingdom
- Post town: Bridport
- Postcode district: DT6
- Dialling code: 01308
- Police: Dorset
- Fire: Dorset and Wiltshire
- Ambulance: South Western
- UK Parliament: West Dorset
- Website: Village photos

Powerstock is a village and civil parish in south west Dorset, England, situated in a steep valley on the edge of the Dorset Downs, 5 miles (8 km) north-east of the market town of Bridport. The civil parish includes the village of West Milton to the west and the summit and northern slopes of Eggardon Hill to the south-east. Powerstock village contains many cottages and two inns: The Three Horseshoes near the church and The Marquis of Lorne Inn on the other side of the valley in a small hamlet called Nettlecombe. The small Mangerton River runs through the valley.

In 2013 the parish had an estimated population of 290. In the 2011 census figures have been published for Powerstock parish combined with the small parish of North Poorton to the north; the population in this area was 358.

Powerstock was rated as among the "20 most beautiful villages in the UK and Ireland" by Condé Nast Traveler in 2020.

== History ==
The origins of the name Powerstock have not been fully determined; the second part derives from the Old English stoc, meaning an outlying farmstead, but the first part—similar to the nearby settlement of Poorton—is unresolved. In the Domesday Book of 1086 it was recorded as Povrestoch.

Powerstock Castle is a medieval motte and bailey castle. St Mary's Parish Church dates from the 12th century and is a Grade I listed building.

According to one source, the name was 'Poorstock' until the Bridport Railway was built through the village in 1857, when the change to Powerstock was made to avoid connotations of 'poor (rolling) stock'. However another source states the name existed in its current form as early as 1787. Powerstock railway station (and the entire Bridport branch line) closed on 5 May 1975.

== Landscape ==
Poorstock Forest was one of the 80 royal forests created by the Normans in the 11th, 12th and early 13th centuries, in part to support medieval hunting. The term forest originally referred to land where hunting and forestry rights were reserved for a monarch or the aristocracy.

The nearby Eggardon Hill (height 827 feet (252 m)) lies about 1.5 miles (2.4 km) south-east of the village. On the summit is a 14-hectare Iron Age hill-fort, from which can be viewed a wide panorama of the Dorset countryside. Just over a mile to the east of the village lies the nature reserve of Powerstock Common.

Another prominent hill is Drackenorth, some 1.9 miles (3 km) north-northeast, which lies on the Jubilee Trail.

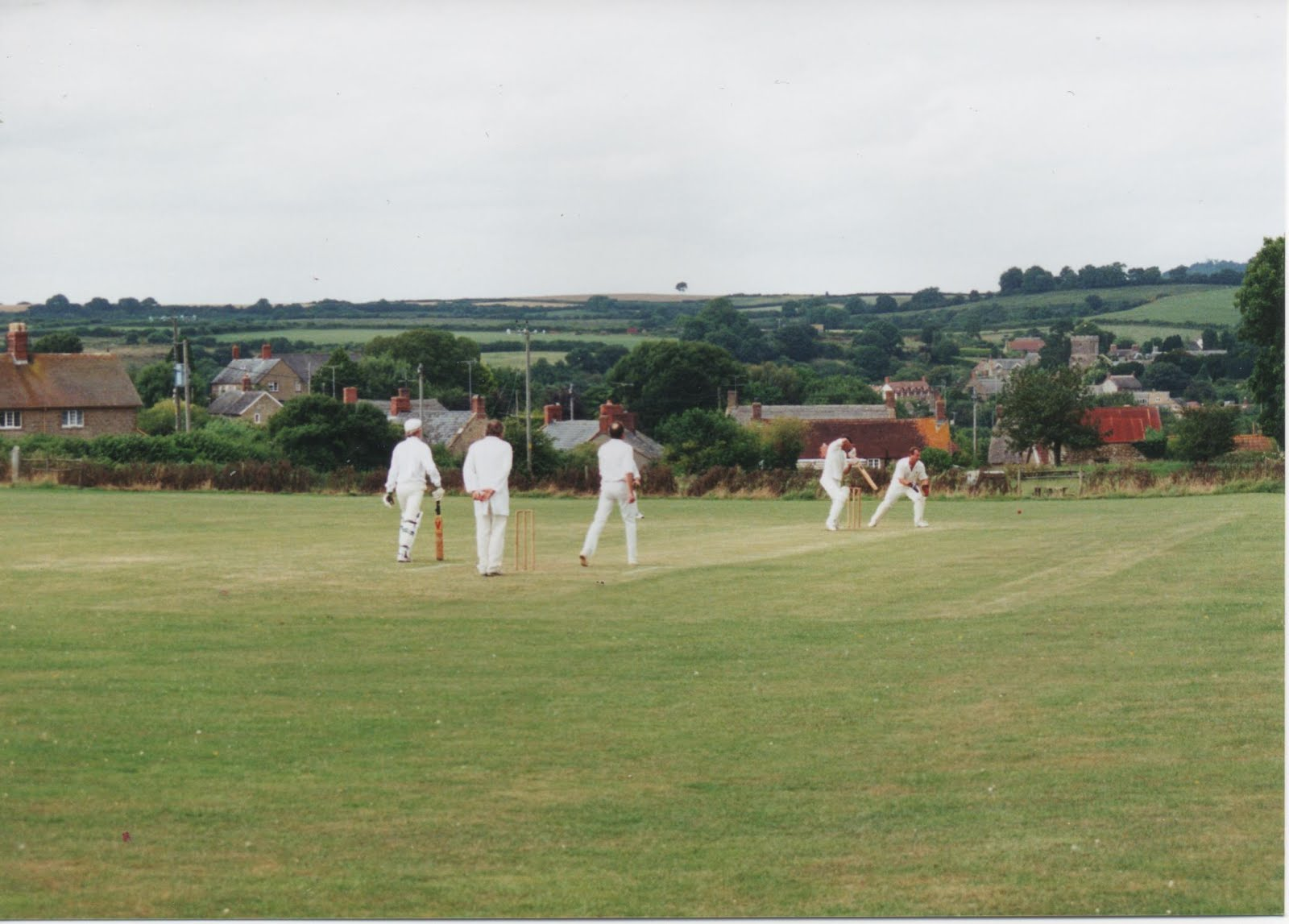
A cricket match at The Weir Cricket Ground, Nettlecombe

There is also a cricket pitch located at The Weir playing field in Nettlecombe. This has traditionally been used by Powerstock and Hooke Cricket Club. It has also been used to host Powerstock's Village Fete.

== In popular culture ==
Powerstock was used as the filming location for a BBC production of Agatha Christie's A Murder is Announced and the 2010 Springwatch series.

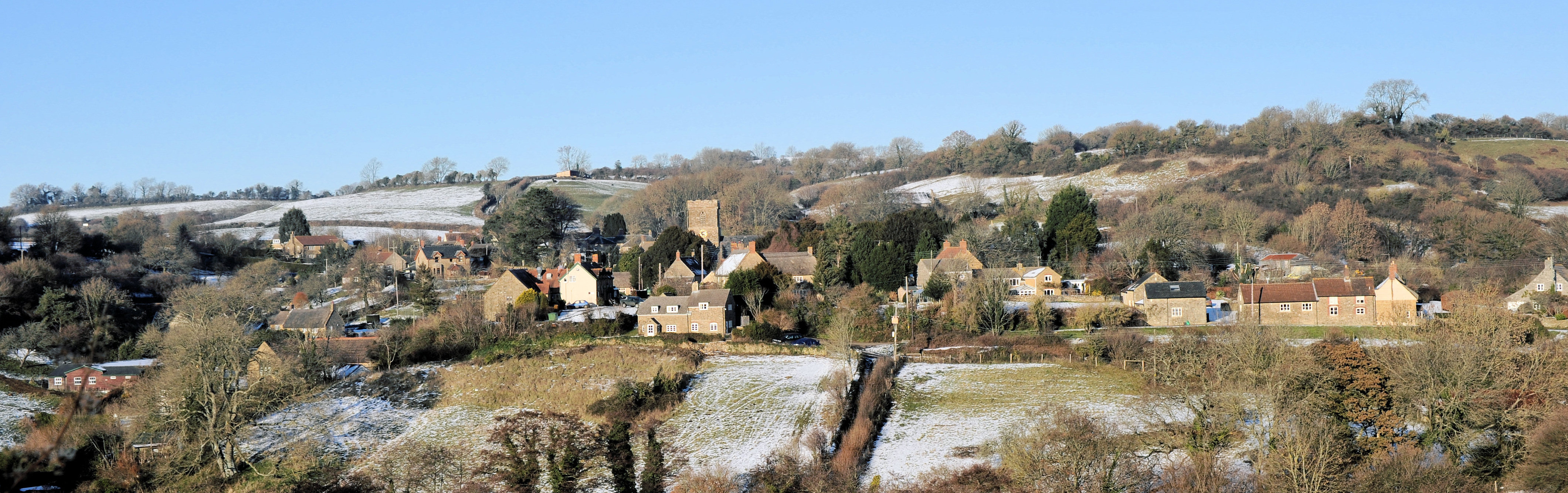
Panorama of Powerstock, December 2010
