= Eggardon Hill =

Hillfort in Dorset, England

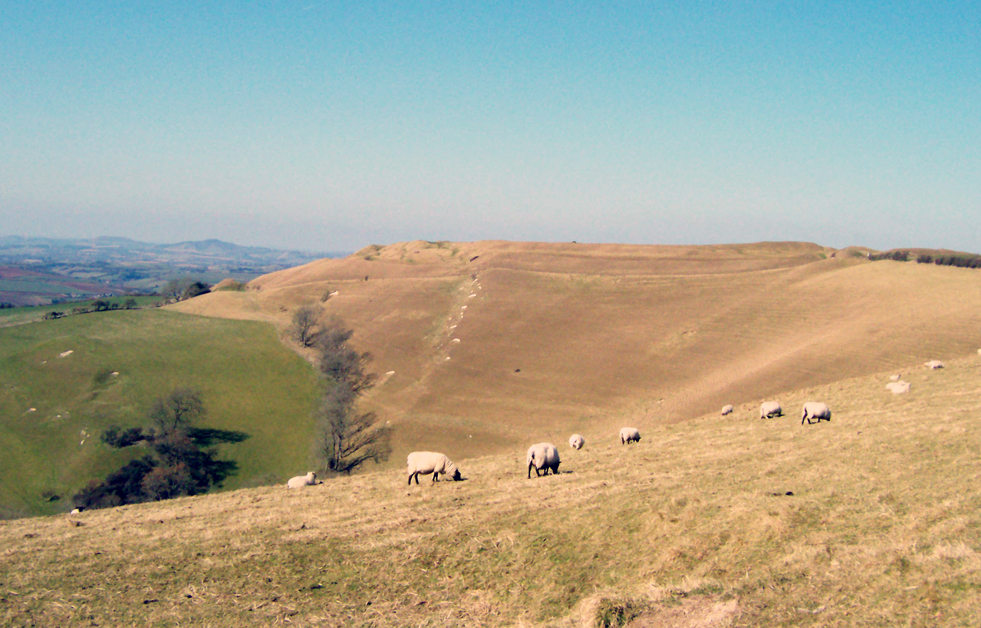
- Eggardon Hill from the southeast

Highest point
- Elevation: 252 m (827 ft)
- Prominence: 115 m (377 ft)
- Listing: Hardy
- Coordinates: 50°45′00″N 2°39′02″W

Geography
- Location: Dorset, England
- Parent range: Dorset Downs
- OS grid: SY541947
- Topo map: OS Landranger 194

Eggardon Hill is a prehistoric hillfort on a hill in Dorset, England. It is located on chalk uplands approximately four miles to the east of the town of Bridport.

== The Hill ==
Eggardon Hill stands 252 metres (827 ft) above sea level and is classified as a Hump (hill of any height with a drop of 100 metres or more on all sides). The highest point is to the east of the hillfort, (some sources give a height of 254m). The hill provides extensive views of the surrounding countryside and the English Channel to the south. The southern half of the hill is owned and maintained by The National Trust (which permits free public access throughout the year) with the northern part in private ownership.

== Prehistory ==
The earliest archaeological features on the hill are linear earthworks which cross the interior. These were partially excavated during 1963-6 and found to be Bronze Age. There are also two bowl barrows within the area of the hillfort that were dated to the Middle Bronze Age. There are also three further bowl barrows and a disc barrow on the top of the hill outside of the area of the hillfort.

The large multivallate hillfort dates from the Iron Age. The surviving earthworks enclose an area of approximately 21ha in total. The defences consist of three ramparts with two medial ditches with additional outer banks to the north-west and east. Ditches and counterscarp banks provide additional protection at the staggered entrances and to the south west where there is an additional outwork.

== Later history ==
The Hundred of Eggardon is first documented in the Domesday Book of 1086.

The name Eggardon is derived from an Old English place name, meaning the hill belonging to Eohhere.

The smuggler Isaac Gulliver (1745-1822) (who owned Eggardon Hill Farm) is reputed to have planted a stand of pine trees on Eggardon Hill, to provide an aid to navigation for his ships as they approached the Dorset coast. Although the trees were later felled on government orders, the octagonal earthworks used to protect them from the elements is still visible today and marked on Ordnance Survey maps of the area.

== Preservation ==
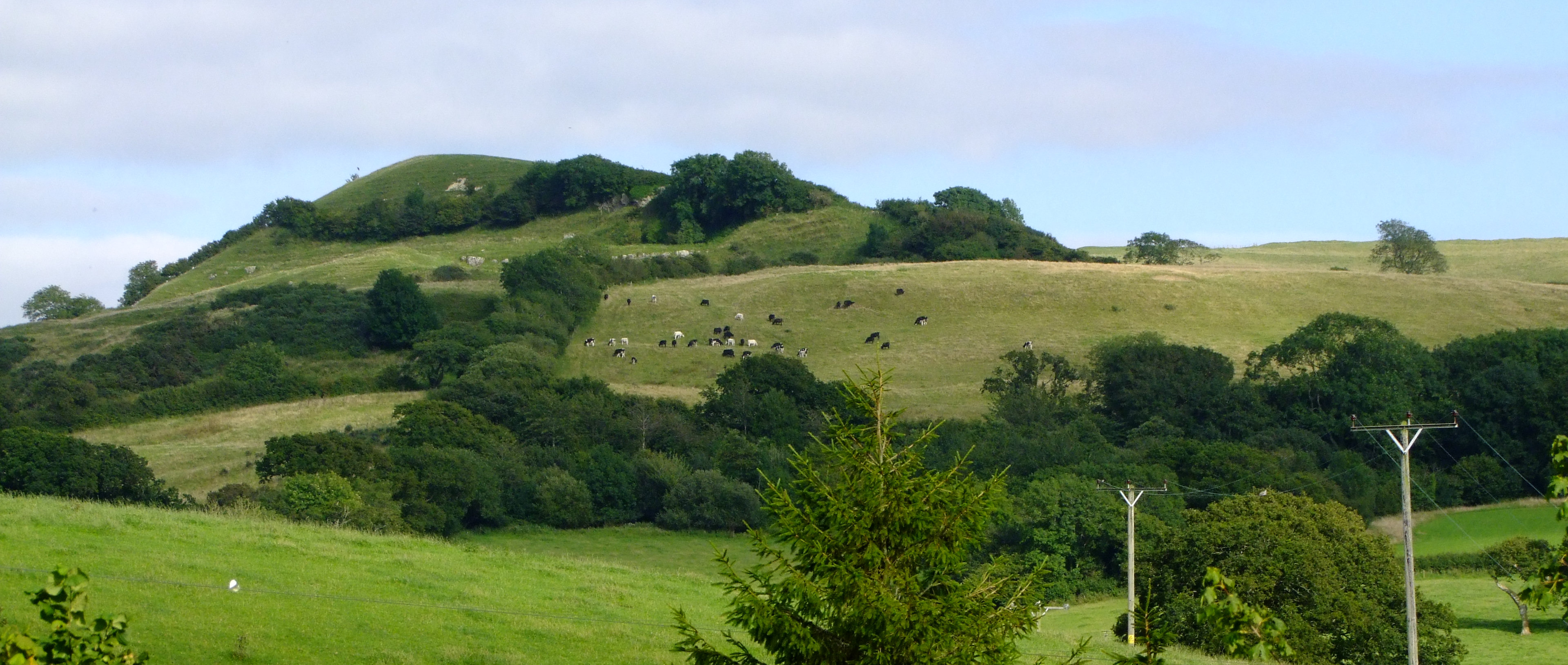
Eggardon Hill from the South West, August 2009

The Hillfort and the two bowl barrows within it are a scheduled monument. The group of three bowl barrows and the disc barrow outside of the hillfort are scheduled separately.

The southern half of the hill is owned and maintained by The National Trust (which permits free public access throughout the year) with the northern part in private ownership.
