= Grade II* listed buildings in West Dorset =

GradeII* listed buildings in West Dorset, England

West Dorset shown in Dorset

There are over 20,000 Grade II* listed buildings in England. This page is a list of these buildings in the district of West Dorset in the county of Dorset.

== Locations A–B ==
Name	Location	Type	Completed (Note: The date given is the date used by Historic England as significant for the initial building or that of an important part in the structure's description.)	Date designated	Grid ref. (Note: The grid reference is based on the British national grid reference system, sometimes known as OSGB36, used by the Ordnance Survey.) Geo-coordinates	Entry number (Note: The "List Entry Number" is a unique number assigned to each listed building and scheduled monument by Historic England.)	Image
Abbotsbury Abbey Abbott's Walk	Abbotsbury	Abbey building	14th century	26 January 1956	SY5780485177; 50°39′53″N 2°35′54″W	1118746	Abbotsbury Abbey Abbott's Walk
Abbotsbury Abbey Gatehouse	Abbotsbury	Abbey gatehouse	14th century	26 January 1956	SY5769685208; 50°39′54″N 2°36′00″W	1118741	Upload Photo
Abbotsbury Abbey Pigeon House	Abbotsbury	Dovecote	15th century	26 January 1956	SY5787085035; 50°39′48″N 2°35′51″W	1172244	Upload Photo
Abbotsbury Abbey Pynion End Gable	Abbotsbury	Abbey gable end	Late 14th century	26 January 1956	SY5778385146; 50°39′52″N 2°35′55″W	1172220	Abbotsbury Abbey Pynion End Gable More images
Rodden House	Rodden, Abbotsbury	House	Early 18th century	26 January 1956	SY6111984215; 50°39′23″N 2°33′05″W	1324196	Rodden House More images
The Manor House	Abbotsbury	Manor house	Late 16th century	26 January 1956	SY5771285245; 50°39′55″N 2°35′59″W	1324227	The Manor House
Parish Church of St Pancras	Alton Pancras	Anglican parish church	15th-century tower	26 January 1956	ST6988002403; 50°49′13″N 2°25′44″W	1118915	Parish Church of St Pancras More images
The Manor House	Alton Pancras	House	c. 1730–44	26 January 1956	ST6991902384; 50°49′13″N 2°25′42″W	1118879	The Manor House
Parish Church of St Michael	Askerswell	Anglican parish church	15th-century tower	5 September 1960	SY5299492588; 50°43′52″N 2°40′03″W	1213455	Parish Church of St Michael More images
South Eggardon Farmhouse	South Eggardon Farm, Askerswell	Farmhouse	16th century or earlier	7 August 1952	SY5358093749; 50°44′29″N 2°39′33″W	1118792	South Eggardon Farmhouse
Dovecote 15 Metres North West of Athelhampton Hall	Athelhampton	Dovecote	Early 16th century	26 January 1956	SY7701594289; 50°44′52″N 2°19′38″W	1119127	Dovecote 15 Metres North West of Athelhampton Hall More images
Garden Pavilions, Walls and Terraces Immediately South and South West of Athelhampton Hall, Including Wall and Archway Linking Gardens to Stables	Athelhampton	Pavilions	c. 1891	10 March 1987	SY7703394188; 50°44′49″N 2°19′37″W	1323996	Garden Pavilions, Walls and Terraces Immediately South and South West of Athelhampton Hall, Including Wall and Archway Linking Gardens to Stables
Stables 50 Metres South West of Athelhampton Hall	Athelhampton	Stables	Early 17th century	10 March 1987	SY7699694250; 50°44′51″N 2°19′39″W	1119128	Stables 50 Metres South West of Athelhampton Hall
Barton End, and Attached Walls at Rear	Beaminster	House	Early 18th century	22 December 1983	ST4811901566; 50°48′41″N 2°44′16″W	1291242	Barton End, and Attached Walls at Rear More images
Champions with Front Wall 30 Metres to South	Beaminster	Town house	Late 17th century	12 June 1953	ST4797301402; 50°48′35″N 2°44′23″W	1220584	Champions with Front Wall 30 Metres to South More images
Devonia	Beaminster	Detached house	Late 18th century	12 June 1953	ST4792301370; 50°48′34″N 2°44′26″W	1220022	Upload Photo
Farrs	Beaminster	Detached house	Early 18th century	12 June 1953	ST4819401162; 50°48′28″N 2°44′12″W	1290324	Upload Photo
Front Courtyard and South Terrace Walls and Gazebos, at Parnham	Parnham, Beaminster	Courtyard	c. 1910	22 December 1983	ST4746400279; 50°47′59″N 2°44′49″W	1221181	Upload Photo
Hitts House and Front Walls, Wagon Stones and Continuations to East and West	Beaminster	Detached house	Late 17th century	12 June 1953	ST4825701078; 50°48′25″N 2°44′09″W	1210734	Upload Photo
Meerhay Manor	Meerhay, Beaminster	Manor farmhouse	c. 1610	12 June 1953	ST4851402642; 50°49′16″N 2°43′56″W	1290899	Meerhay Manor
Midland Bank	Beaminster	Town house	17th century	12 June 1953	ST4803801327; 50°48′33″N 2°44′20″W	1290452	Upload Photo
Pines	Beaminster	House	Late 18th century	12 June 1953	ST4804601365; 50°48′34″N 2°44′19″W	1118732	Pines More images
Stable Block 25 Metres East of the Manor House	Beaminster	Stables	c. 1670	22 December 1983	ST4828801405; 50°48′36″N 2°44′07″W	1220908	Upload Photo
Stable Block North of Parnham House (Workshops and Offices)	Parnham, Beaminster	Stable	c. 1910	22 December 1983	ST4752000330; 50°48′01″N 2°44′46″W	1221179	Upload Photo
The Manor House and Stable Block	Beaminster	Manor house	Late 18th century	12 June 1953	ST4824401409; 50°48′36″N 2°44′09″W	1220906	Upload Photo
The Yews	Beaminster	Detached house	Late 17th century	22 December 1983	ST4821401113; 50°48′26″N 2°44′11″W	1290326	Upload Photo
Attached Service Ranges, West of Manor House, and Brick Wall at Front	Bettiscombe	Service buildings	18th century	8 April 1983	ST4011800322; 50°47′58″N 2°51′04″W	1324079	Upload Photo
Bettiscombe Manor House with Attached South Front Area Wall and Gate-Piers	Bettiscombe	Manor house	Early 18th century	4 December 1951	ST4014100322; 50°47′58″N 2°51′03″W	1118973	Upload Photo
Garden Walls Attached on North Side of Manor House	Bettiscombe	Garden walls		8 April 1983	ST4012000352; 50°47′59″N 2°51′04″W	1324081	Upload Photo
Pillar Box at Barnes Cross at ST 693 118	Cornford Hill, Bishop's Caundle	Pillar box	1853	16 September 1987	ST6930811775; 50°54′17″N 2°26′16″W	1237251	Pillar Box at Barnes Cross at ST 693 118 More images
New Holy Trinity Church	Bothenhampton	Anglican parish church	1887–89	19 December 1984	SY4703591943; 50°43′29″N 2°45′06″W	1213728	New Holy Trinity Church More images
Smith's Bridge	Bradford Abbas	Road bridge	16th century	11 July 1951	ST5896314032; 50°55′27″N 2°35′07″W	1119407	Smith's Bridge More images
Church of St Mary	Bradford Peverell	Anglican parish church	1849–50	26 January 1956	SY6580293030; 50°44′09″N 2°29′09″W	1324204	Church of St Mary More images
Church of St Swithun	North Allington, Bridport	Anglican parish church	1826–27	28 November 1950	SY4613793094; 50°44′06″N 2°45′53″W	1216300	Church of St Swithun More images
Daniel Taylor's Almshouses and Wall of Friends' Burial Place	Bridport	Almshouses	15th and 16th century	28 November 1950	SY4662292577; 50°43′49″N 2°45′28″W	1287414	Daniel Taylor's Almshouses and Wall of Friends' Burial Place
Downe Hall	Bridport	House	18th century	28 November 1950	SY4674493207; 50°44′10″N 2°45′22″W	1215760	Upload Photo
Former Literary and Scientific Institute	Bridport	Public library	19th century	28 November 1950	SY4678692918; 50°44′00″N 2°45′19″W	1118999	Former Literary and Scientific Institute More images
Granby House Masonic Hall	Bridport	Houses	1769	28 November 1950	SY4703592840; 50°43′58″N 2°45′07″W	1118972	Upload Photo
Granville House	Bridport	House	Mid 18th century	28 November 1950	SY4649992986; 50°44′02″N 2°45′34″W	1279223	Granville House More images
Messrs Norman Goods Warehouse	West Bay, Bridport	Warehouse	18th century	19 September 1975	SY4636090350; 50°42′37″N 2°45′40″W	1228722	Messrs Norman Goods Warehouse More images
The Castle (Museum and Art Gallery)	Bridport	House	Early 16th century	28 November 1950	SY4660692823; 50°43′57″N 2°45′29″W	1227857	The Castle (Museum and Art Gallery) More images
The Chantry	Bridport	House	Probably 14th or 15th century	28 November 1950	SY4658592424; 50°43′44″N 2°45′29″W	1287219	Upload Photo
The Walls to Garden Behind No 74, East Street	Bridport	House wall	Late 18th century	28 November 1950	SY4690092871; 50°43′59″N 2°45′14″W	1118969	The Walls to Garden Behind No 74, East Street More images
Unitarian Chapel	Bridport	Unitarian chapel	1794	28 November 1950	SY4678992961; 50°44′02″N 2°45′19″W	1324052	Unitarian Chapel More images
133–139, North Allington	Allington, Bridport	Houses	16th or 17th century	28 November 1950	SY4609793543; 50°44′20″N 2°45′55″W	1216318	Upload Photo
34 West Street	Bridport	House	Mid 18th century	28 November 1950	SY4645692954; 50°44′01″N 2°45′36″W	1229114	Upload Photo
27 and 29, West Allington	Allington, Bridport	Houses	Late 18th or early 19th century	28 November 1950	SY4614893015; 50°44′03″N 2°45′52″W	1228694	27 and 29, West Allington More images
9 East Street	Bridport	House	16th or 17th century	28 November 1950	SY4661692948; 50°44′01″N 2°45′28″W	1118996	9 East Street More images
3 Monuments Immediately East of South Tower of Church of St Martin	Broadmayne	Table tombs	17th century	27 October 1986	SY7284386636; 50°40′43″N 2°23′09″W	1323943	Upload Photo
Parish Church of St Martin	Broadmayne	Anglican parish church	Late 13th century	26 January 1956	SY7284486645; 50°40′44″N 2°23′09″W	1119258	Parish Church of St Martin More images
Barn 20 Metres East of Childhay Manor Farmhouse	Childhay, Broadwindsor	Cruck barn	16th century or possibly later	4 December 1951	ST4096504047; 50°49′59″N 2°50′23″W	1118783	Upload Photo
Bere Chapel Farmhouse	Broadwindsor	Farmhouse	16th century	8 October 1973	ST3917305751; 50°50′53″N 2°51′55″W	1118770	Upload Photo
Childhay Manor Farmhouse	Childhay, Broadwindsor	Farmhouse	Late 15th century	4 December 1951	ST4095504011; 50°49′57″N 2°50′23″W	1291153	Childhay Manor Farmhouse
Old Sandpitts	Sandpit, Broadwindsor	Farmhouse	15th century	31 July 1984	ST4251004524; 50°50′15″N 2°49′04″W	1210321	Upload Photo
Parish Church of St John the Baptist	Broadwindsor	Anglican parish church	Late 12th or early 13th century	11 November 1966	ST4377702651; 50°49′14″N 2°47′58″W	1118784	Parish Church of St John the Baptist More images
Park	Broadwindsor	Farmhouse	16th century	4 December 1951	ST4437203330; 50°49′37″N 2°47′28″W	1118777	Upload Photo
Racedown House with Attached Rear Garden Walls, and Gate Pier to North	Birdsmoorgate, Broadwindsor	House	Mid and late 18th century	4 December 1951	ST3969401654; 50°48′41″N 2°51′26″W	1118781	Upload Photo
South Dibberford Farmhouse	Broadwindsor	Farmhouse	17th century	4 December 1951	ST4642503733; 50°49′50″N 2°45′44″W	1118771	South Dibberford Farmhouse More images
Church of St Nicholas	Buckland Ripers	Anglican parish church	15th century	20 May 1985	SY6513482538; 50°38′29″N 2°29′40″W	1151971	Church of St Nicholas More images
Burstock Grange	Burstock	Farmhouse	c. 15th century	4 December 1951	ST4246202428; 50°49′07″N 2°49′05″W	1215390	Upload Photo
Parish Church of St Andrew	Burstock	Anglican parish church	Possibly 12th century	11 November 1966	ST4222602914; 50°49′22″N 2°49′18″W	1210375	Parish Church of St Andrew More images

== Locations C–D ==
Name	Location	Type	Completed	Date designated	Grid ref. Geo-coordinates	Entry number	Image
Dairy, Immediately North-West of Sherborne Castle	Castleton	Dairy	Late 18th century	11 July 1951	ST6487516416; 50°56′46″N 2°30′05″W	1153919	Upload Photo
Greenhouse 60 Metres North-West of Sherborne Castle	Castleton	Greenhouse	c. 1779	11 July 1951	ST6485516456; 50°56′47″N 2°30′06″W	1323883	Upload Photo
Pinford Bridge	Sherborne Park, Castleton	Bridge	Late 18th century	31 July 1961	ST6620216968; 50°57′04″N 2°28′57″W	1323885	Upload Photo
The Stables, 300 Metres West-South-West of Sherborne Castle	Sherborne Park, Castleton	Stables	1759	7 November 1951	ST6463016341; 50°56′43″N 2°30′17″W	1119381	The Stables, 300 Metres West-South-West of Sherborne Castle
Two Barns 120 Metres North-West of Wyke House	Wyke, Castleton	Barns	16th century	11 July 1951	ST6001614616; 50°55′47″N 2°34′13″W	1304035	Upload Photo
Wyke House	Wyke, Castleton	Farmhouse	1650	11 July 1951	ST6010014481; 50°55′42″N 2°34′09″W	1119382	Upload Photo
Parish Church (St Mary)	Catherston Leweston	Anglican parish church	1857–58	10 January 1984	SY3696594391; 50°44′44″N 2°53′41″W	1213892	Parish Church (St Mary) More images
Holway Farmhouse	Cattistock	Farmhouse	Early 17th century	26 January 1956	ST5860401094; 50°48′28″N 2°35′20″W	1304977	Upload Photo
Manor Farmhouse	Caundle Marsh	House	16th century	11 July 1951	ST6780413274; 50°55′05″N 2°27′34″W	1324144	Manor Farmhouse
North Barn 75 Metres North-North-West of the Abbot's Porch	Cerne Abbey, Cerne Abbas	Barn	Early 16th century	26 January 1956	ST6647901484; 50°48′43″N 2°28′38″W	1323850	Upload Photo
The New Inn	Cerne Abbas	Coaching inn	Late 17th century	26 January 1956	ST6649901131; 50°48′32″N 2°28′37″W	1323837	The New Inn More images
The Old Farmhouse	Cerne Abbas	House	Mid 18th century	26 January 1956	ST6668801190; 50°48′33″N 2°28′27″W	1119451	The Old Farmhouse More images
The Old House	Cerne Abbas	House	Early 18th century	26 January 1956	ST6657201189; 50°48′33″N 2°28′33″W	1304900	The Old House More images
Forston House and Attached Terrace Walls to West	Forston, Charminster	House	Early 18th century	26 January 1956	SY6658195742; 50°45′37″N 2°28′31″W	1119094	Upload Photo
The Riding House	Wolfeton, Charminster	Riding school	Late 16th century	26 January 1956	SY6785192254; 50°43′44″N 2°27′25″W	1119102	Upload Photo
Queen's Armes Hotel	Charmouth	Coaching inn	Early 16th century	7 August 1952	SY3661093659; 50°44′21″N 2°53′59″W	1324126	Queen's Armes Hotel More images
Manor Farmhouse with Attached Barn at Rear	Chedington	Farmhouse	16th century	12 June 1953	ST4893605596; 50°50′51″N 2°43′36″W	1210837	Upload Photo
Lyscombe Chapel	Lyscombe, Cheselbourne	Chapel	16th century	26 January 1956	ST7366701066; 50°48′31″N 2°22′30″W	1119105	Lyscombe Chapel More images
Old Rectory	Cheselbourne	House	Late 16th century	26 January 1956	SY7619799871; 50°47′52″N 2°20′21″W	1324022	Upload Photo
Parish Church of St Peter	Chetnole	Anglican parish church	13th century	31 July 1961	ST6022408190; 50°52′19″N 2°34′00″W	1304234	Parish Church of St Peter More images
Spring Cottage	Chetnole	House	Late 15th century	31 July 1961	ST6043907734; 50°52′04″N 2°33′49″W	1153488	Upload Photo
The Court	Chetnole	Country house	Mid 18th century	11 July 1951	ST6030108266; 50°52′21″N 2°33′56″W	1119188	Upload Photo
The Grange	Chetnole	Villa	Early 19th century	11 July 1951	ST6025907979; 50°52′12″N 2°33′58″W	1323990	Upload Photo
Parish Church of St Mary	Chickerell	Anglican parish church	13th century	26 January 1956	SY6438680689; 50°37′29″N 2°30′17″W	1118696	Parish Church of St Mary More images
Mortuary Chapel (Roman Catholic) Including Walls and Gates	Chideock	Mortuary chapel	1857	10 January 1984	SY4215792908; 50°43′58″N 2°49′16″W	1288009	Mortuary Chapel (Roman Catholic) Including Walls and Gates More images
Roman Catholic Church at Chideock Manor	North Chideock	Roman Catholic church	1874	10 January 1984	SY4203393457; 50°44′16″N 2°49′22″W	1287989	Roman Catholic Church at Chideock Manor More images
Church of the Holy Trinity	Chilfrome	Anglican parish church	15th century	26 January 1956	SY5905298795; 50°47′14″N 2°34′56″W	1288702	Church of the Holy Trinity More images
Building 10 Metres South-East of Clifton House (the Library)	Clifton Maybank	Library	Mid 16th century	2 June 1986	ST5765613894; 50°55′23″N 2°36′14″W	1304043	Upload Photo
Church of St Thomas of Canterbury	Compton Valence	Anglican parish church	15th century tower, rest 1838–39	26 January 1956	SY5928793247; 50°44′15″N 2°34′42″W	1214304	Church of St Thomas of Canterbury More images
Benville Manor	Corscombe	Manor house	Early 17th century	12 June 1953	ST5342803708; 50°49′52″N 2°39′46″W	1210861	Benville Manor
Court Farmhouse	Court, Corscombe	Farmhouse	17th century	12 June 1953	ST5261205418; 50°50′47″N 2°40′28″W	1290052	Court Farmhouse More images
Tithe Barn 40 Metres North West of Court Farmhouse	Court, Corscombe	Barn		22 December 1983	ST5258705450; 50°50′48″N 2°40′29″W	1289993	Tithe Barn 40 Metres North West of Court Farmhouse
Church of All Saints	Dewlish	Anglican parish church	16th century	26 January 1956	SY7754998177; 50°46′58″N 2°19′11″W	1119107	Church of All Saints More images
Manor Farm House	Dewlish	Manor house	Early 17th century	26 January 1956	SY7751598176; 50°46′58″N 2°19′13″W	1154326	Upload Photo
Antelope Hotel	Cornhill, Dorchester	Hotel	Early 19th century	8 May 1950	SY6923790679; 50°42′54″N 2°26′14″W	1324415	Antelope Hotel More images
Church of All Saints. Railings at West End, and Churchyard Steps at South East Corner of Church of All Saints	Dorchester	Anglican parish church	1843–45	8 May 1950	SY6934490733; 50°42′55″N 2°26′08″W	1110582	Church of All Saints. Railings at West End, and Churchyard Steps at South East Corner of Church of All Saints More images
Church of St Mary	West Fordington, Dorchester	Anglican parish church	1910–12	8 May 1975	SY6873990074; 50°42′34″N 2°26′39″W	1110596	Church of St Mary More images
Colliton House	Dorchester	House	16th or 17th century	8 May 1950	SY6905290792; 50°42′57″N 2°26′23″W	1324441	Upload Photo
Fordington House. Entrance Gates	Dorchester	House	Mid 18th century	8 May 1950	SY6985290242; 50°42′40″N 2°25′42″W	1119036	Fordington House. Entrance Gates
Kings Arms Hotel	Dorchester	Hotel	Late 18th or early 19th century	8 May 1950	SY6932290758; 50°42′56″N 2°26′09″W	1110587	Kings Arms Hotel More images
Municipal Buildings	Dorchester	Town hall	1847–48	8 May 1975	SY6928290759; 50°42′56″N 2°26′11″W	1110585	Municipal Buildings More images
Napper's Mite	Dorchester	Almshouses	1610	8 May 1950	SY6925090475; 50°42′47″N 2°26′13″W	1219851	Napper's Mite More images
South Lodge	Dorchester	House	c. 1740–50	8 May 1950	SY6925390387; 50°42′44″N 2°26′13″W	1220609	South Lodge
3 Cornhill	Cornhill, Dorchester	House	Late Georgian	8 May 1950	SY6927790708; 50°42′55″N 2°26′12″W	1110634	3 Cornhill More images
42 High West Street	Dorchester	House	Early to mid 18th century	8 May 1975	SY6894790704; 50°42′54″N 2°26′28″W	1119064	42 High West Street
23 and 23A High West Street	Dorchester	House	1735	8 May 1950	SY6907190701; 50°42′54″N 2°26′22″W	1218838	23 and 23A High West Street
3 Trinity Street	Dorchester	House	Mid 18th century	8 May 1975	SY6919090649; 50°42′53″N 2°26′16″W	1220612	Upload Photo
10 South Street	Dorchester	House	Late 18th century	8 May 1950	SY6927790570; 50°42′50″N 2°26′11″W	1291253	10 South Street More images
31–33 High East Street	Dorchester	House	c. 1854	8 May 1975	SY6934490758; 50°42′56″N 2°26′08″W	1291942	31–33 High East Street More images
6 High West Street	Dorchester	House	17th century	8 May 1950	SY6920890717; 50°42′55″N 2°26′15″W	1324037	6 High West Street More images

== Locations E–L ==
Name	Location	Type	Completed	Date designated	Grid ref. Geo-coordinates	Entry number	Image
Lion Gate	Evershot	Gate piers	Late 17th century	2 June 1986	ST5752105147; 50°50′39″N 2°36′17″W	1119300	Upload Photo
Church of St Osmund	Evershot	Anglican parish church	12th century, heavily restored 1852–53	11 November 1966	ST5724904500; 50°50′18″N 2°36′31″W	1153641	Church of St Osmund More images
The Mansion	Evershot	House	Mid 18th century	4 December 1951	ST5731004480; 50°50′18″N 2°36′27″W	1153711	The Mansion More images
Old Parish Church	East Fleet	Anglican parish church	c. 15th century	26 January 1956	SY6354580051; 50°37′08″N 2°31′00″W	1118700	Old Parish Church More images
Folke Manor	Folke	Country house	Late 15th or early 16th century	11 July 1951	ST6592013279; 50°55′05″N 2°29′10″W	1324147	Folke Manor
Font Le Roi	Folke	Gatehouse	15th century	11 July 1951	ST6720613620; 50°55′16″N 2°28′05″W	1118865	Upload Photo
Frampton House	Frampton Park, Frampton	House	Early 19th century	26 January 1956	SY6260194631; 50°45′00″N 2°31′53″W	1288471	Upload Photo
Peacock Bridge over River Frome, East Drive to Frampton House	Frampton Park, Frampton	Bridge	Late 18th century	26 January 1956	SY6327094616; 50°45′00″N 2°31′19″W	1214653	Peacock Bridge over River Frome, East Drive to Frampton House More images
Stable Block and Coach House Immediately North of Frampton House	Frampton Park, Frampton	House	Early 19th century	26 January 1956	SY6256494659; 50°45′01″N 2°31′55″W	1214652	Upload Photo
Frome House	Frome St Quintin	Detached house	1782	26 January 1956	ST5973102661; 50°49′19″N 2°34′23″W	1119410	Upload Photo
Church of St Francis	Frome Vauchurch	Anglican parish church	12th century	26 January 1956	SY5994897208; 50°46′23″N 2°34′10″W	1288446	Church of St Francis More images
Pitman Monument 2 Metres North of North Chapel of Church of Holy Trinity	Godmanstone	Table tomb	1717	20 May 1985	SY6659097384; 50°46′30″N 2°28′31″W	1215084	Upload Photo
Church of St Juthware and St Mary	Halstock	Anglican parish church	15th century tower	11 November 1966	ST5364808374; 50°52′23″N 2°39′36″W	1119266	Church of St Juthware and St Mary More images
Church of St Mary	Hermitage	Anglican parish church	17th century	31 July 1961	ST6496806956; 50°51′40″N 2°29′57″W	1118871	Church of St Mary More images
Church of St Nicholas	Hilfield	Anglican parish church	15th century	31 July 1961	ST6351005102; 50°50′39″N 2°31′11″W	1151982	Church of St Nicholas More images
Buckshaw House	Buckshaw, Holwell	House	Mid 18th century	21 May 1984	ST6871511328; 50°54′02″N 2°26′47″W	1152103	Buckshaw House More images
Cornford Bridge	Holwell	Road bridge	15th century	11 July 1951	ST6916512043; 50°54′25″N 2°26′24″W	1324112	Cornford Bridge
Manor House	The Borough, Holwell	Country house	16th century	11 July 1951	ST6892410402; 50°53′32″N 2°26′36″W	1118845	Upload Photo
Naish Farmhouse	Holwell	Farmhouse	15th century	11 July 1951	ST7056211225; 50°53′59″N 2°25′12″W	1118847	Upload Photo
The Rectory	The Borough, Holwell	Rectory	Early 18th century	11 July 1951	ST6992311908; 50°54′21″N 2°25′45″W	1304902	Upload Photo
Hooke Court	Hooke	Country house	17th century	12 June 1953	ST5310900421; 50°48′05″N 2°40′00″W	1119415	Hooke Court More images
Kingston Russell Farmhouse	Higher Kingston Russell	Farmhouse	Mid 18th century	20 May 1985	SY5818991394; 50°43′14″N 2°35′37″W	1324226	Upload Photo
Langton Cross	Langton Cross, Langton Herring	Cross	Medieval	26 January 1956	SY6242182423; 50°38′25″N 2°31′58″W	1118663	Langton Cross More images
Cromwell Cottage	Leigh	House	Mid–late 16th century	31 July 1961	ST6204708608; 50°52′33″N 2°32′27″W	1119163	Upload Photo
Iles Farm House Including Front Boundary Wall	Leigh	Farmhouse	Late 16th – early 17th century	8 October 1986	ST6214608598; 50°52′32″N 2°32′22″W	1119164	Upload Photo
Parish Church of St Andrew	Leigh	Anglican parish church	15th century	31 July 1961	ST6178808662; 50°52′34″N 2°32′40″W	1119160	Parish Church of St Andrew More images
St Antony's Convent	Leweston Manor, Leweston	Country house	Late 18th century	11 July 1951	ST6364312323; 50°54′33″N 2°31′07″W	1119166	Upload Photo
Barn at Lower Stockbridge Farm 30m East of Lower Stockbridge Farm House	Lillington	Cruck barn	Late 16th – Early 17th century	8 October 1986	ST6391411085; 50°53′53″N 2°30′52″W	1323979	Upload Photo
Tythe Barn	Lower Lillington	Barn	c. 1600	11 July 1951	ST6292412727; 50°54′46″N 2°31′43″W	1153984	Tythe Barn More images
Bridehead	Bridehead, Littlebredy	Country house	c. 1837	26 January 1956	SY5894188788; 50°41′50″N 2°34′58″W	1324249	Bridehead More images
Parish Church of St Michael and All Angels	Littlebredy	Anglican parish church	13th century, rebuilt 1850	26 January 1956	SY5876889028; 50°41′58″N 2°35′07″W	1118668	Parish Church of St Michael and All Angels More images
Loders Court	Loders	Manor house	Late 18th century	5 September 1960	SY4914494303; 50°44′46″N 2°43′20″W	1288076	Loders Court More images
Baglake Farmhouse and Attached Wall to East for 26 Metres	Long Bredy	Farmhouse	17th century	26 January 1956	SY5557090581; 50°42′47″N 2°37′50″W	1304834	Upload Photo
St Luke's Chapel	Ashley Chase, Long Bredy	Chapel	15th century	26 January 1956	SY5579187936; 50°41′22″N 2°37′38″W	1118673	St Luke's Chapel More images
Belmont	Lyme Regis	House	Probably c. 1785	27 October 1953	SY3374892040; 50°43′27″N 2°56′24″W	1230135	Belmont More images
Roman Catholic Church of St Michael and St George. Presbytery.	Lyme Regis	Roman Catholic church	1835	31 January 1974	SY3376092290; 50°43′35″N 2°56′23″W	1230401	Roman Catholic Church of St Michael and St George. Presbytery. More images
Shelby House	Lyme Regis	House	Early 19th century	23 April 1952	SY3416792257; 50°43′34″N 2°56′03″W	1229647	Upload Photo
The Guildhall	Lyme Regis	Guildhall	Rebuilt 1887	23 April 1952	SY3429792110; 50°43′30″N 2°55′56″W	1228691	The Guildhall More images

== Locations M–O ==
Name	Location	Type	Completed	Date designated	Grid ref. Geo-coordinates	Entry number	Image
Village Cross	Maiden Newton	Market cross	15th century	26 January 1956	SY5971797709; 50°46′39″N 2°34′22″W	1216391	Village Cross More images
West Cruxton Farmhouse	Cruxton, Maiden Newton	Farmhouse	Late 16th century	26 January 1956	SY6025896548; 50°46′02″N 2°33′54″W	1287680	Upload Photo
2 Sets of Gate Piers with Attached Walls and Mounting Block	Mapperton	Gate pier	c. 18th century	31 July 1984	SY5032299676; 50°47′40″N 2°42′22″W	1288093	Upload Photo
Dovecote 10 Metres South of Mapperton House	Mapperton	Dovecote	1665	4 December 1951	SY5035299640; 50°47′39″N 2°42′21″W	1288090	Upload Photo
Enclosure Wall and Gate Piers South and West of Mapperton Church	Mapperton	Gate pier	19th century	31 July 1984	SY5033099646; 50°47′39″N 2°42′22″W	1215504	Enclosure Wall and Gate Piers South and West of Mapperton Church
Garden Wall, Continuation North of Front Courtyard Wall, Returns West to Orangery	Mapperton House, Mapperton	Garden wall	c. 18th or 19th century	31 July 1984	SY5033499714; 50°47′41″N 2°42′22″W	1288055	Upload Photo
Gate Piers with Eagles and Attached Walls 15 Metres West of Mapperton House	Mapperton	Gate piers	18th century	31 July 1984	SY5033099674; 50°47′40″N 2°42′22″W	1215500	Gate Piers with Eagles and Attached Walls 15 Metres West of Mapperton House
Mapperton Rectory	Mapperton	Rectory	1699–1703	4 December 1951	SY5028999756; 50°47′43″N 2°42′24″W	1288056	Upload Photo
Nash Farmhouse	Marshwood	Farmhouse	c. 1400	3 April 1985	SY3759498928; 50°47′12″N 2°53′12″W	1324121	Nash Farmhouse More images
Remains of Marshwood Castle, 50 Metres West of Lodge House Farmhouse	Marshwood	Angle tower		4 December 1951	SY4045897698; 50°46′33″N 2°50′45″W	1324105	Upload Photo
The Manor House and Attached Garden Walls	Melbury Bubb	Manor house	Early 17th century	11 July 1951	ST5957706562; 50°51′26″N 2°34′32″W	1154078	The Manor House and Attached Garden Walls More images
The Old Rectory	Melbury Osmond	Rectory	17th century	4 December 1951	ST5743307808; 50°52′06″N 2°36′23″W	1119284	Upload Photo
The Turret	Melbury House, Melbury Sampford	Garden house	c. 16th century	2 June 1986	ST5760405965; 50°51′06″N 2°36′13″W	1154965	Upload Photo
Christ Church	Melplash	Anglican parish church	1845–46	31 July 1984	SY4844597552; 50°46′31″N 2°43′57″W	1287858	Christ Church More images
Dovecote 10 Metres North West of Melplash Court	Melplash	Dovecote	17th century	31 July 1984	SY4832698473; 50°47′01″N 2°44′04″W	1215869	Upload Photo
Melplash Court	Melplash	House	17th century	4 December 1951	SY4834298479; 50°47′01″N 2°44′03″W	1215868	Melplash Court More images
Church of St Andrew	Minterne Magna	Anglican parish church	Early 15th century	26 January 1956	ST6595504340; 50°50′15″N 2°29′05″W	1118823	Church of St Andrew More images
Minterne Magna House	Minterne Magna	Country house	1904–06	7 April 1976	ST6603204184; 50°50′10″N 2°29′01″W	1324164	Minterne Magna House More images
Church of St Andrew	Monkton Wyld	Anglican parish church	1848	5 September 1960	SY3365496340; 50°45′46″N 2°56′31″W	1228490	Church of St Andrew More images
3 Table Tombs 2–5 Metres East of the Chancel. (Horner, Brodrepp, Purchase)	Netherbury	Table tomb	1690–1829	31 July 1984	SY4705399460; 50°47′32″N 2°45′09″W	1216205	Upload Photo
5 Table Tombs 5–10 Metres East and South East of South Porch (Clift, Hearn, Crode, Henvill, Defaced)	Netherbury	Table tomb	1702–1772	31 July 1984	SY4703799444; 50°47′32″N 2°45′10″W	1216096	Upload Photo
Hatchlands	Netherbury	Farmhouse	17th century	4 December 1951	SY4732398970; 50°47′16″N 2°44′55″W	1215922	Upload Photo
Lambrook Farmhouse	Lambrook, Netherbury	Farmhouse	16th century	4 December 1951	SY4745896306; 50°45′50″N 2°44′47″W	1215847	Upload Photo
Limbury Farmhouse	Netherbury	Farmhouse	c. 1700	4 December 1951	SY4549495784; 50°45′33″N 2°46′27″W	1215764	Upload Photo
Slape Manor	Slape Hill, Netherbury	Manor house	17th century	4 December 1951	SY4718798425; 50°46′59″N 2°45′02″W	1216045	Slape Manor More images
Wooth Manor	Wooth, Netherbury	Manor house	Early 17th century	4 December 1951	SY4723495423; 50°45′22″N 2°44′58″W	1216283	Upload Photo
Remains of Old Church of St Mary Magdalene	North Wootton	Tower	Early 15th century	31 July 1961	ST6555214796; 50°55′54″N 2°29′30″W	1303981	Remains of Old Church of St Mary Magdalene More images
Barn 50 Metres West of Ivy House Farmhouse	Oborne	Barn	Early 16th century	31 July 1961	ST6532817897; 50°57′34″N 2°29′42″W	1119360	Upload Photo
Old Parish Church of St Cuthbert, Oborne	Oborne	Anglican parish church	Early 16th century	31 July 1961	ST6534817833; 50°57′32″N 2°29′41″W	1304077	Old Parish Church of St Cuthbert, Oborne More images
Charity Farmhouse and Attached Forge	Osmington	Farmhouse	17th century	1 November 1985	SY7239683274; 50°38′55″N 2°23′30″W	1119223	Upload Photo
Parish Church of St Osmund	Osmington	Anglican parish church	15th century tower	26 January 1956	SY7241982980; 50°38′45″N 2°23′29″W	1323965	Parish Church of St Osmund More images
Parish Church of St Michael	Owermoigne	Anglican parish church	Early 15th century tower	26 January 1956	SY7688685322; 50°40′02″N 2°19′42″W	1119232	Parish Church of St Michael More images

== Locations P–S ==
Name	Location	Type	Completed	Date designated	Grid ref. Geo-coordinates	Entry number	Image
The Manor House	Piddletrenthide	Country house	Late 18th century	26 January 1956	SY7035299991; 50°47′55″N 2°25′19″W	1304315	The Manor House
Pilsdon Manor (the Pilsdon Community)	Pilsdon	Manor house	Mid 17th century	11 November 1966	SY4150199597; 50°47′35″N 2°49′53″W	1216404	Pilsdon Manor (the Pilsdon Community) More images
Purcombe Farmhouse	Pilsdon	House	Early 16th century	4 December 1951	SY4110999065; 50°47′17″N 2°50′13″W	1153145	Purcombe Farmhouse More images
Attached Walls and 2 Sets of Gate-Piers South-West of Waddon Manor	Waddon, Portesham	Walls	Early 18th century	26 January 1956	SY6197285772; 50°40′13″N 2°32′22″W	1118648	Attached Walls and 2 Sets of Gate-Piers South-West of Waddon Manor
Cart Shed and Stables 10 Metres South of Waddon House, Part Premises of Hardye Tweeds	Waddon, Portesham	Cart shed	1702	26 January 1956	SY6200785759; 50°40′13″N 2°32′20″W	1152606	Cart Shed and Stables 10 Metres South of Waddon House, Part Premises of Hardye Tweeds
Chapel of St Bartholomew	Corton, Portesham	Chapel	13th century	26 January 1956	SY6359285484; 50°40′04″N 2°31′00″W	1118639	Chapel of St Bartholomew More images
Manor House and Stables	Portesham	Manor house	Mid 17th century	26 January 1956	SY6014885849; 50°40′15″N 2°33′55″W	1304769	Upload Photo
Cider House 10 Metres South West of the Manor House	Mappercombe, Powerstock	Cider house	1736	31 July 1984	SY5117595116; 50°45′13″N 2°41′37″W	1287653	Upload Photo
Cottage 10 Metres North West of the Manor House	Mappercombe, Powerstock	Detached house	1698	31 July 1984	SY5117495143; 50°45′14″N 2°41′37″W	1216413	Upload Photo
Dovecote 15 Metres East of the Manor House	Mappercombe, Powerstock	Dovecote	1747	31 July 1984	SY5123095131; 50°45′13″N 2°41′34″W	1216482	Upload Photo
Barn, at North West Corner of Farmyard	Manor Farm, Poxwell	Barn	Late 16th century	26 January 1956	SY7413384163; 50°39′24″N 2°22′02″W	1323934	Upload Photo
Gatehouse and Attached Garden Walls Immediately East of Poxwell House	Poxwell	Gatehouse	1634	26 January 1956	SY7416084005; 50°39′19″N 2°22′01″W	1153834	Upload Photo
The Court House	Poyntington	Farmhouse	Late 14th century	11 July 1951	ST6499019978; 50°58′41″N 2°30′00″W	1119325	Upload Photo
The Manor House	Poyntington	Manor house	Late 15th century	11 July 1951	ST6509920063; 50°58′44″N 2°29′55″W	1323898	The Manor House
Ilsington House	Ilsington, Puddletown	Country house	Late 17th – early 18th century	26 January 1956	SY7600394364; 50°44′54″N 2°20′29″W	1324049	Upload Photo
The Old Vicarage Including Garden Walls Adjoining Islington House	Puddletown	Semi-detached house	c. 1600	26 January 1956	SY7594394367; 50°44′54″N 2°20′32″W	1154384	Upload Photo
8 The Square	Puddletown	Semi-detached house	c. 1722	26 January 1956	SY7593294367; 50°44′54″N 2°20′33″W	1303784	8 The Square More images
Looke Farmhouse	Puncknowle	Farmhouse	1700	7 August 1952	SY5482288812; 50°41′50″N 2°38′28″W	1287947	Looke Farmhouse More images
Puncknowle Manor House	Puncknowle	Manor house	c. 1600	7 August 1952	SY5348088628; 50°41′44″N 2°39′36″W	1288106	Puncknowle Manor House More images
Village Cross in Churchyard 4 Metres North East of Parish Church Chancel	Puncknowle	Cross	c. late 15th century	5 September 1960	SY5351788652; 50°41′44″N 2°39′34″W	1287939	Village Cross in Churchyard 4 Metres North East of Parish Church Chancel More images
Churchyard Cross 3 Metres North of North Aisle of Church of St Michael	Rampisham	Cross	Late 15th century	19 November 1985	ST5615902217; 50°49′04″N 2°37′25″W	1119421	Upload Photo
Glebe Cottage and Attached Walls	Ringstead	House	13th century	26 January 1956	SY7473181764; 50°38′06″N 2°21′31″W	1119231	Upload Photo
Parish Church of St Hypolite	Ryme Intrinseca	Anglican parish church	13th century	31 July 1961	ST5817910825; 50°53′43″N 2°35′46″W	1119143	Parish Church of St Hypolite More images
Barn 40 Metres West of Jerrards	Sandford Orcas	Cruck barn	Late 16th century	11 July 1951	ST6201220484; 50°58′57″N 2°32′33″W	1119336	Upload Photo
Jerrards, with Attached Service Range and Pigeon-house	Sandford Orcas	House	16th century	11 July 1951	ST6206220489; 50°58′57″N 2°32′31″W	1119335	Upload Photo
Abbeylands	Sherborne	House	1649	28 November 1950	ST6381716662; 50°56′54″N 2°30′59″W	1324329	Abbeylands More images
Church of St Mary Magdalene	Sherborne	Anglican parish church	1715	28 November 1950	ST6462616814; 50°56′59″N 2°30′18″W	1152050	Church of St Mary Magdalene More images
Emerenciana	Coombe, Sherborne	Farmhouse	17th century	28 November 1950	ST6343817037; 50°57′06″N 2°31′19″W	1110756	Upload Photo
Former Church House, Half Moon Street	Sherborne	House	1530–34	28 November 1950	ST6386516478; 50°56′48″N 2°30′57″W	1110736	Former Church House, Half Moon Street More images
Former Hospice of Saint Julian	Sherborne	Hospice	Late medieval	28 November 1950	ST6376016922; 50°57′02″N 2°31′02″W	1324341	Former Hospice of Saint Julian More images
Gates and Gate Piers at South Entrance to Abbey Close	Sherborne	Gates		4 October 1973	ST6379116436; 50°56′46″N 2°31′00″W	1324348	Gates and Gate Piers at South Entrance to Abbey Close
Greenhill House	Sherborne	House	17th century	28 November 1950	ST6371116867; 50°57′00″N 2°31′05″W	1110763	Greenhill House More images
No 101 Newland, Including Outbuilding to South-East	Sherborne	House	17th century	4 October 1973	ST6432016821; 50°56′59″N 2°30′33″W	1110660	Upload Photo
No 9 and No 11 Cheap Street	Sherborne	House	Late 18th or early 19th century	28 November 1950	ST6380216850; 50°57′00″N 2°31′00″W	1152083	No 9 and No 11 Cheap Street
Oak Room at Sherborne School	Sherborne	Library	1670	28 November 1950	ST6384116520; 50°56′49″N 2°30′58″W	1110793	Upload Photo
Old Bank House	Sherborne	House	16th to early 17th century	28 November 1950	ST6398016538; 50°56′50″N 2°30′51″W	1110719	Old Bank House More images
Riverside. Riverside Lodge. Riverside Works.	Sherborne	House	18th century, probably post–1755	28 November 1950	ST6355615925; 50°56′30″N 2°31′12″W	1110647	Upload Photo
The Cedars	Sherborne	House	Early 19th century	4 October 1973	ST6429716709; 50°56′55″N 2°30′35″W	1110714	Upload Photo
The Parade	Sherborne	Bank	Probably 1818	28 November 1950	ST6386016578; 50°56′51″N 2°30′57″W	1152194	The Parade
The Red House. Grey Lodge. Forecourt Walls and Railings to the Red House.	Sherborne	House	Late 17th century	28 November 1950	ST6411716631; 50°56′53″N 2°30′44″W	1152478	Upload Photo
Tudor Rose	Sherborne	Timber framed house	Late medieval	28 November 1950	ST6394316548; 50°56′50″N 2°30′53″W	1324372	Tudor Rose More images
Parish Church of St Martin	Shipton Gorge	Anglican parish church	Early 15th century tower	5 September 1960	SY4980691459; 50°43′14″N 2°42′45″W	1215781	Parish Church of St Martin More images
Pickett Farmhouse	South Perrott	Farmhouse	17th century	12 June 1953	ST4718105479; 50°50′47″N 2°45′06″W	1211820	Upload Photo
Chapel of St Gabriel	Stanton St Gabriel	Chapel of ease	14th century	5 September 1960	SY4020892409; 50°43′42″N 2°50′55″W	1215956	Chapel of St Gabriel More images
Court Orchard	Stoke Abbott	Farmhouse	1751	11 November 1966	ST4531200647; 50°48′10″N 2°46′39″W	1287140	Court Orchard More images
Manor Farmhouse	Stoke Abbott	Farmhouse	Mid 18th century	4 December 1951	ST4526400800; 50°48′15″N 2°46′41″W	1228420	Upload Photo
Churchyard Cross 10 Metres North of Nave of Church of St Mary	Stratton	Cross	15th century	20 May 1985	SY6510993790; 50°44′34″N 2°29′45″W	1287606	Upload Photo
East House	Sydling St Nicholas	Detached house	Mid – late 18th century	26 January 1956	SY6314399425; 50°47′36″N 2°31′27″W	1119396	Upload Photo
Sydling Court	Sydling St Nicholas	Manor house	Late 18th century	26 January 1956	SY6301099326; 50°47′32″N 2°31′34″W	1119425	Upload Photo
The Old Vicarage	Sydling St Nicholas	House	1640	26 January 1956	SY6316399386; 50°47′34″N 2°31′26″W	1119395	Upload Photo
Tithe Barn	Sydling St Nicholas	Tithe barn	16th century	26 January 1956	SY6304899237; 50°47′29″N 2°31′32″W	1119426	Tithe Barn More images
Ilchester Arms	Symondsbury	Public house	15th century	7 August 1952	SY4449393510; 50°44′19″N 2°47′17″W	1216501	Ilchester Arms More images
Broomhills Farm	Symondsbury	House	17th century	10 January 1984	SY4611791661; 50°43′19″N 2°45′53″W	1216084	Upload Photo
Oakhayes, Formerly Listed As Rectory	Symondsbury	Rectory	c. 1730	7 August 1952	SY4440593591; 50°44′21″N 2°47′21″W	1216432	Upload Photo

== Locations T–Y ==
Name	Location	Type	Completed	Date designated	Grid ref. Geo-coordinates	Entry number	Image
Forde Grange, the Barn with Attached Farmbuildings to North	Thorncombe	Cruck barn	Early 16th century	8 April 1983	ST3661804612; 50°50′15″N 2°54′05″W	1118937	Upload Photo
Sadborow House	Sadborow, Thorncombe	Country house	1773–75	8 April 1983	ST3733402022; 50°48′52″N 2°53′27″W	1118930	Upload Photo
Parish Church of St Mary Magdalene	Thornford	Anglican parish church	14th century	31 July 1961	ST6030513270; 50°55′03″N 2°33′58″W	1303905	Parish Church of St Mary Magdalene More images
Church of St Basil	Toller Fratrum	Anglican parish church	Mid 19th century	26 January 1956	SY5786697397; 50°46′29″N 2°35′56″W	1228873	Church of St Basil More images
Little Toller Farmhouse	Toller Fratrum	Manor farmhouse	Mid 16th century	26 January 1956	SY5781997410; 50°46′29″N 2°35′59″W	1228875	Little Toller Farmhouse More images
Stable block immediately south east of Little Toller Farm	Toller Fratrum	Stable	Mid 16th century	26 January 1956	SY5784497381; 50°46′28″N 2°35′57″W	1228876	Upload Photo
Church of St Peter	Toller Porcorum	Anglican parish church	14th century	26 January 1956	SY5621497993; 50°46′47″N 2°37′21″W	1228957	Church of St Peter More images
The Manor House	Toller Whelme	Manor house	17th century	12 June 1953	ST5171901489; 50°48′39″N 2°41′12″W	1290014	The Manor House More images
Former Methodist Chapel to East of Martyrs' Cottages	Tolpuddle	Methodist chapel	1818	4 July 1989	SY7951794410; 50°44′56″N 2°17′30″W	1119849	Upload Photo
James Hammett Monument, East of the North West Corner of the Church Yard of the Church of Saint John	Tolpuddle	Headstone	1934	10 March 1987	SY7903494514; 50°44′59″N 2°17′55″W	1323627	James Hammett Monument, East of the North West Corner of the Church Yard of the Church of Saint John More images
Tolpuddle Manor House	Tolpuddle	Manor house	1696	26 January 1956	SY7908894446; 50°44′57″N 2°17′52″W	1323641	Tolpuddle Manor House
Flamberts	Trent	House	16th century	11 July 1951	ST5967618606; 50°57′56″N 2°34′32″W	1154391	Upload Photo
The Rectory and Glebe House	Trent	Houses	17th century	11 July 1951	ST5906818566; 50°57′54″N 2°35′03″W	1323928	The Rectory and Glebe House
Hummer Farmhouse	Hummer, Trent	Farmhouse	Late 15th century	11 July 1951	ST5889319758; 50°58′33″N 2°35′13″W	1119317	Hummer Farmhouse More images
Rigg Lane Farmhouse	Trent	Farmhouse	Second half of 15th century or early 16th century	11 July 1951	ST5968918731; 50°58′00″N 2°34′32″W	1303847	Upload Photo
Church of Unknown Dedication	Up Cerne	Anglican parish church	Possibly 15th century	26 January 1956	ST6583002742; 50°49′24″N 2°29′11″W	1304283	Church of Unknown Dedication More images
Up Cerne Manor House	Up Cerne	Manor house	Early 17th century	26 January 1956	ST6581702683; 50°49′22″N 2°29′12″W	1118810	Up Cerne Manor House More images
Upton Manor Farmhouse	Uploders	Farmhouse	16th century	7 August 1952	SY5113193530; 50°44′22″N 2°41′38″W	1214893	Upload Photo
Berry Farmhouse	Walditch	Cruck house	16th century	19 December 1984	SY4828392815; 50°43′57″N 2°44′03″W	1213863	Upload Photo
Church of the Holy Trinity	Warmwell	Anglican parish church	13th century	26 January 1956	SY7527685798; 50°40′17″N 2°21′04″W	1119203	Church of the Holy Trinity More images
Barn 80 Metres South West of Lower Lewell Farmhouse	Lower Lewell, West Knighton	Barn	1704	26 January 1956	SY7418589663; 50°42′22″N 2°22′01″W	1323959	Upload Photo
Tower, Remains of West Milton Chapel	West Milton	Tower	c. 1500	11 November 1966	SY5030596371; 50°45′53″N 2°42′22″W	1227969	Tower, Remains of West Milton Chapel More images
Higher Abbott's Wootton Farmhouse	Whitchurch Canonicorum	Farmhouse	Mid 15th century	7 August 1952	SY3794696463; 50°45′52″N 2°52′52″W	1216622	Higher Abbott's Wootton Farmhouse More images
Herringston House	Winterborne Herringston	Courtyard house	14th century	26 January 1956	SY6890988092; 50°41′30″N 2°26′29″W	1119179	Herringston House More images
Parish Church of St Simon and St Jude	Winterborne Monkton	Anglican parish church	13th century	26 January 1956	SY6757187741; 50°41′18″N 2°27′38″W	1119180	Parish Church of St Simon and St Jude More images
Manor Farmhouse	Winterbourne Steepleton	Manor farmhouse	Early 17th century	26 January 1956	SY6271189838; 50°42′25″N 2°31′46″W	1229228	Manor Farmhouse More images
Sherring Monument 3 Metres South of Chancel of Church of St Michael	Winterbourne Steepleton	Table tomb	Early 18th century	20 May 1985	SY6292089799; 50°42′24″N 2°31′35″W	1279268	Upload Photo
Wootton Fitzpaine Parish Church	Wootton Fitzpaine	Anglican parish church	15th century	5 September 1960	SY3714495641; 50°45′25″N 2°53′33″W	1228551	Wootton Fitzpaine Parish Church More images
Bennett Monument One Metre East of Chancel of Church of St Mary	Lower Wraxall	Table tomb	Early 18th century	19 November 1985	ST5758200824; 50°48′19″N 2°36′12″W	1119405	Bennett Monument One Metre East of Chancel of Church of St Mary
Wraxall Manor with Attached Front Walls, Piers, Gates	Wraxall	Manor house	Early 17th century	4 December 1957	ST5664001139; 50°48′29″N 2°37′00″W	1302719	Wraxall Manor with Attached Front Walls, Piers, Gates More images
Manor Farmhouse	Wynford Eagle	Manor house	1630	26 January 1956	SY5838396017; 50°45′44″N 2°35′29″W	1229230	Manor Farmhouse More images
Hamlet House, Including Attached Maltings and Outbuildings	Hamlet, Yetminster	House	17th century	11 July 1951	ST6000508686; 50°52′35″N 2°34′11″W	1119153	Upload Photo
Manor House, Including Front Boundary Wall	Yetminster	House	Early 17th century	11 July 1951	ST5941910856; 50°53′45″N 2°34′42″W	1154493	Manor House, Including Front Boundary Wall More images
Upbury Farm House	Yetminster	Farmhouse	15th century	11 July 1951	ST5939710611; 50°53′37″N 2°34′43″W	1119148	Upbury Farm House More images

== See also ==
- Grade I listed buildings in Dorset
