= Alick Williams =

British Army officer (1910–1994)

Major-General Alick Williams CB CBE MC
- Born: 8 June 1910; Herringston, Dorchester, Dorset
- Died: 2 November 1994 (aged 84); Herringston, Dorchester, Dorset
- Military career
- Allegiance: United Kingdom
- Branch: British Army
- Service years: 1930–1965
- Rank: Major-General
- Nickname: "Alick"
- Service number: 47677
- Unit: King's Royal Rifle Corps
- Commands: Singapore Base District (1962–1963); 2nd Division (1960–1962); 2nd Infantry Brigade (1956–1957); 2nd Battalion, King's Royal Rifle Corps (1954–55); 1st Battalion, King's Royal Rifle Corps (1944–1945)
- Conflicts: Arab revolt in Palestine; Second World War
- Awards: Companion of the Order of the Bath; Commander of the Order of the British Empire; Military Cross; Mentioned in despatches
- Other work: Deputy Lieutenant of Dorset

Major-General Edward Alexander Wilmot Williams, CB, CBE, MC (8 June 1910 – 2 November 1994) was a British Army officer who served in the Second World War and later commanded the 2nd Division from 1960 to 1962.

== Military career ==
Alexander Williams was born on 8 June 1910 in Herringston House, Dorchester, Dorset, England, the son of Captain Berkeley Cole Wilmot Williams, a British Army officer, and the Hon. Winifred Mary Williams, the elder daughter of the second Lord Addington. He was educated at Eton College before attending the Royal Military College, Sandhurst, from where he was commissioned as a second lieutenant into the King's Royal Rifle Corps (KRRC) on 28 August 1930. He was posted to the 2nd Battalion, KRRC, then serving in Tidworth, Wiltshire, before the battalion moved in 1932 to Northern Ireland. Promoted to lieutenant on 28 August 1933, the 2nd KRRC returned to England in 1935. Williams, along with the battalion, now commanded by Lieutenant Colonel Evelyn Barker, was sent to Palestine in 1936, following the outbreak of the Arab revolt, before again returning to England in 1937, where it was converted into a motorised infantry battalion and became part of the Mobile Division (from April 1939 the 1st Armoured Division), under Major General Alan Brooke. In January 1939 Williams, who on 28 August 1938 was promoted to captain, was made adjutant to the 2nd KRRC, now commanded by Lieutenant Colonel Thomas Wilson after Barker was promoted to command a brigade.

Williams was still adjutant upon the outbreak of the Second World War in September 1939. By then the battalion, alongside the 1st Rifle Brigade (The Prince Consort's Own), formed the infantry component of the 1st Support Group, under Brigadier Frederick Morgan, of the 1st Armoured Division, now under Major General Roger Evans. Instead of being sent to France to join the British Expeditionary Force (BEF), however, the division remained in the United Kingdom. In late April 1940 the 2nd KRRC, now under Lieutenant-Colonel Euan Miller, and the 1st Rifle Brigade were transferred to the 30th Infantry Brigade, under Brigadier Claude Nicholson, and was initially to be sent to Norway to fight in the Norwegian Campaign. However, the German Army invaded France and the brigade was instead sent, in mid-May, to Calais, France, where, despite fighting for several days, the 30th Brigade, along with most of the battalion—including Williams—was forced to surrender, most spending the rest of the conflict as a prisoner of war (POW).

Williams managed to escape and, after returning to the United Kingdom, was awarded the Military Cross, for "gallant and distinguished services in recent operations", on 3 September 1940. He was made a General Staff Officer Grade 2 (GSO2) at the Senior Officers' School, before being made a brigade major in late July 1942. In mid-December he was made a GSO2 with the headquarters of the First Army, commanded by Lieutenant General Kenneth Anderson. The army was then serving in French North Africa, having landed there as part of Operation Torch some five weeks earlier. Williams remained in this post through most of the rest of the Tunisian Campaign until, in mid-April 1943, he was made a GSO1 with a division. Upon relinquishing this appointment six months later, he was, in late January 1944, given a field command, and became commanding officer of the 1st Battalion, KRRC. The battalion was serving in North Africa as the motorised infantry element of Brigadier Richard Goodbody's 2nd Armoured Brigade, itself part of the 1st Armoured Division, then under Major General Alexander Galloway. On 3 February Williams was mentioned in despatches for his services. The battalion was training for eventual participation in the Italian campaign.

Williams landed in Italy with his battalion, and most of the rest of the 1st Armoured Division, in late May 1944. In late June the battalion was transferred to the 9th Armoured Brigade, before returning to the 2nd Armoured Brigade and taking part in severe fighting in front of the Gothic Line. Williams commanded the battalion throughout most of the battalion's service in Italy until, in March 1945, he was promoted to the acting rank of brigadier (and colonel on the same date) and was posted to Allied Forces Headquarters, before being made a GSO1 with HQ Central Mediterranean Force from October until December 1946.

After the war Williams became Assistant Adjutant-General at the War Office and then, from 1954, commanding officer of the 2nd Battalion the King's Royal Rifle Corps. He was appointed commander of the 2nd Infantry Brigade in 1956, General Officer Commanding 2nd Division in 1960 and chief of staff at Headquarters Far East Land Forces in May 1962. His last appointments were as General Officer Commanding Singapore from November 1962 and Chairman of the Vehicle Committee at the Ministry of Defence from 1964 before retiring in 1965.

In 1970 Williams became High Sheriff of Dorset. He died on 2 November 1994, at the age of 84.

== Family ==
In 1943 Williams married Sybilla Margaret Archdale. Their daughter Victoria Mary married Francis Egerton, 7th Duke of Sutherland, on 11 May 1974.

Military offices
| Preceded by William Stirling | General Officer Commanding 2nd Division; 1960–1962 | Succeeded by Mervyn Butler |
