= Lower Wraxall =

Lower Wraxall may refer to three places in England:

- Lower Wraxall, Dorset
- Lower Wraxall, Somerset
- Lower Wraxall, Wiltshire
