= Lewis Cass Ledyard =

American lawyer (1851–1932)

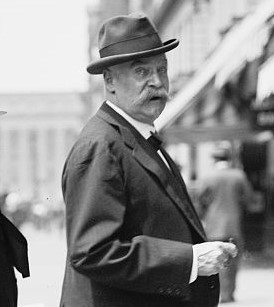
- Ledyard, 1914
- Born: April 4, 1851; Detroit, Michigan, U.S.
- Died: January 27, 1932 (aged 80); New York City, U.S.
- Education: Charlier Institute
- Alma mater: Columbia College; Harvard College; Harvard Law School
- Spouses: Gertrude Prince (m. 1878; died 1905) Frances Isabel Morris (m. 1906)
- Children: Lewis Cass Ledyard, Jr.
- Parent(s): Henry Ledyard; Matilda Frances Cass
- Relatives: Lewis Cass (grandfather)

Lewis Cass Ledyard (April 4, 1851 – January 27, 1932) was a New York City lawyer. He was a partner at the firm Carter Ledyard & Milburn, personal counsel to J.P. Morgan, and a president of the New York City Bar Association.

== Early life ==
Lewis Cass Ledyard was born in Detroit, Michigan, in 1851, to an established American family. He was the fourth of five children born to Henry Brockholst Ledyard (1812–1880) and Matilda Frances Cass (1808–1898). His father was a lawyer, diplomat, and mayor of Detroit. Ledyard had three sisters and a brother, Henry Brockholst Ledyard, who became president of the Michigan Central Railroad and was a well-known philanthropist.

His paternal grandparents were Benjamin Ledyard (1779–1812), a prominent New York attorney, and Susan French (née Livingston) (1789–1864). His grandmother was the daughter of Revolutionary War Colonel and U.S. Supreme Court Justice Henry Brockholst Livingston (1757–1823) and granddaughter of the first governor of New Jersey William Livingston.

His maternal grandfather, General Lewis Cass (1782–1866), had been governor of the Michigan Territory and a United States senator from the state of Michigan, and served as secretary of state under President James Buchanan. His maternal grandmother, Elizabeth (née Spencer) Cass, was the granddaughter of Major-General Joseph Spencer, who served in the American Revolution under George Washington. His aunt, Isabella Cass, married Theodorus Marinus Roest van Limburg, Baron van Limburg (1806–1887), the Dutch Minister of Foreign Affairs. His niece, Matilda Cass Ledyard (1871–1960), married Baron Clemens von Ketteler (1853–1900), a German diplomat.

=== Education ===
Ledyard prepared for college at Charlier Institute, a French school in New York City. He matriculated at Columbia College in 1868, but transferred after his freshman year to Harvard, where he received his Bachelor of Arts degree in 1872. He subsequently attended Harvard Law School, where he graduated with Master of Arts and Bachelor of Laws degrees in 1875. He then moved to New York City, where he was admitted to the bar in 1875, becoming a sixth generation lawyer in his family.

== Career ==
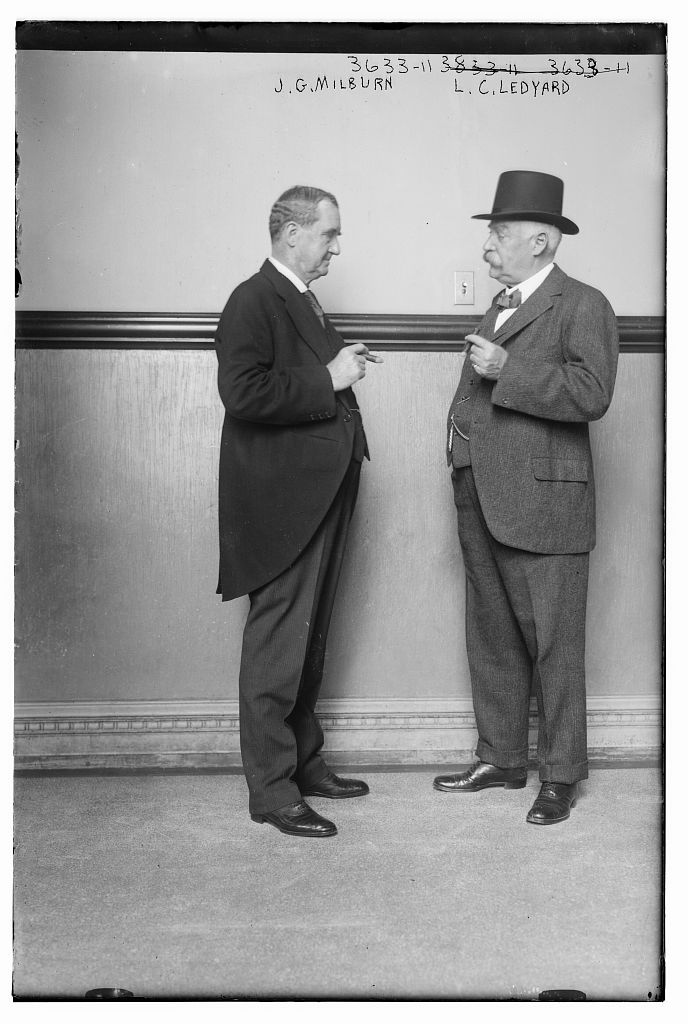
John George Milburn and Lewis Cass Ledyard in 1915-1916

In 1875, Ledyard was introduced to the lawyer James Coolidge Carter, and joined his firm, then known as Scudder & Carter, the same year. He was admitted to partnership in 1880. In 1904, the lawyer John G. Milburn of Buffalo joined, creating the modern firm of Carter, Ledyard & Milburn.

Ledyard, who had a personal interest in sailing, began his practice in admiralty law, but soon expanded into general practice. Following the passage of the Sherman Antitrust Act in 1890, Ledyard became a prominent adviser to the steel, petroleum, and tobacco industries. In 1911, when the United States Supreme Court ruled that the American Tobacco Company was in violation of the Sherman Act, Ledyard oversaw the company's corporate restructuring. Ledyard also served as counsel to the United States Steel Corporation and the New York Stock Exchange, as well as personal counsel to John Pierpont Morgan.

In 1903, Ledyard also oversaw the passage of a bill in the New York State Legislature requiring the electrification of the rail lines at Grand Central Station following a deadly train collision in 1902. The bill and subsequent improvements resulted in the covering of the railroad tracks outside the station, the extension of Park Avenue, and the expansion of valuable real estate in the surrounding area.

=== Civic involvement ===
In addition to his professional career, Ledyard was a prominent figure in New York society and civic life. Along with John Lambert Cadwalader, he was a founder of the New York Public Library and served as its president from 1917 until 1932. He served as a trustee of the Metropolitan Museum of Art and the Pierpont Morgan Library, and was a founding trustee of the Frick Collection.

He served on a number of corporate boards including First National Bank of New York, United States Trust Company of New York, Great Northern Paper Company, American Express Company, Atlantic Mutual Insurance Company, National Park Bank, and several railroads.

From 1901 to 1902, Ledyard also served as Commodore of the New York Yacht Club. In 1914, he became a member of the New Hampshire Society of the Cincinnati by right of his descent from Captain Jonathan Cass who served during the American Revolution.

== Personal life ==
On April 11, 1878, Ledyard married to Gertrude Prince (1851–1905), the daughter of Col. William E. Prince. They had one child, Lewis Cass Ledyard Jr. (1879–1936), who married Ruth Langdon Emery (1881–1966).

After his first wife's death in 1905, he sold their home at 2 East 87th Street and took an apartment in the Tiffany Apartment at 27 East 72nd Street. On June 6, 1906, he married Frances Isabel Morris, the divorced wife of Thurlow Weed Barnes, brother of photographer Catharine Weed Barnes and grandson of publisher Thurlow Weed. She was a daughter of John Albert Morris, a prominent figure in the sport of thoroughbred horse racing, and a sister of Alfred Hennen Morris and Dave Hennen Morris, and had two daughters, Jean Morris Barnes (1893–1963), who married Mansfield Ferry (1882–1938), and Muriel Hennen Morris, who first married Barrington Moore Sr. (1883–1966), in 1910, and later, Richard L. Stokes (1883–1957), in 1929.

Lewis Cass Ledyard died at his home in New York City on January 27, 1932. He was buried at the Island Cemetery in Newport, Rhode Island. His services were conducted by Rev. Dr. George A. Buttrick and the Rev. Dr. Henry Sloane Coffin. His estate was valued in excess of $10,000,000 upon his death.

=== Descendants ===
Through his son, he was the grandfather of Lewis Cass Ledyard III (1911–1990), Dorothy Cass Ledyard, who first married Hugh McLeod Fenwick (1905–1991) (he divorced her in 1931 to marry Millicent Vernon Hammond), and later, Richard Allen Knight (d. 1947), in 1933, and Ruth Emery Ledyard, who married William de Rham, a great-great-grandson of Stephen Whitney, in 1928, and later, William Vernon Chickering Ruxton (1891–1958), in 1932. Her second marriage also ended in divorce in 1943, after the couple had been living at Wraxall Manor in Dorset, England.
