= St Osmund's Church =

St Osmund's Church may refer to:

- St Osmund's Church, Derby, England
- St Osmund's Church, Osmington, England
- St Osmund's Church, Salisbury, England
