= John G. Milburn =

American lawyer (1851–1930)

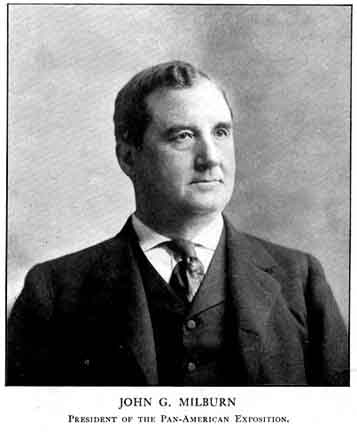
- Milburn in 1901
- Born: John George Milburn; November 14, 1851; Sunderland, England
- Died: August 11, 1930 (aged 78); London, England
- Resting place: Locust Valley Cemetery, Locust Valley, New York, U.S.
- Occupation: Lawyer
- Employer: Carter, Ledyard & Milburn
- Political party: Democrat
- Spouse: Mary Patty Stocking (m. 1875; died 1930)
- Children: Devereux Milburn

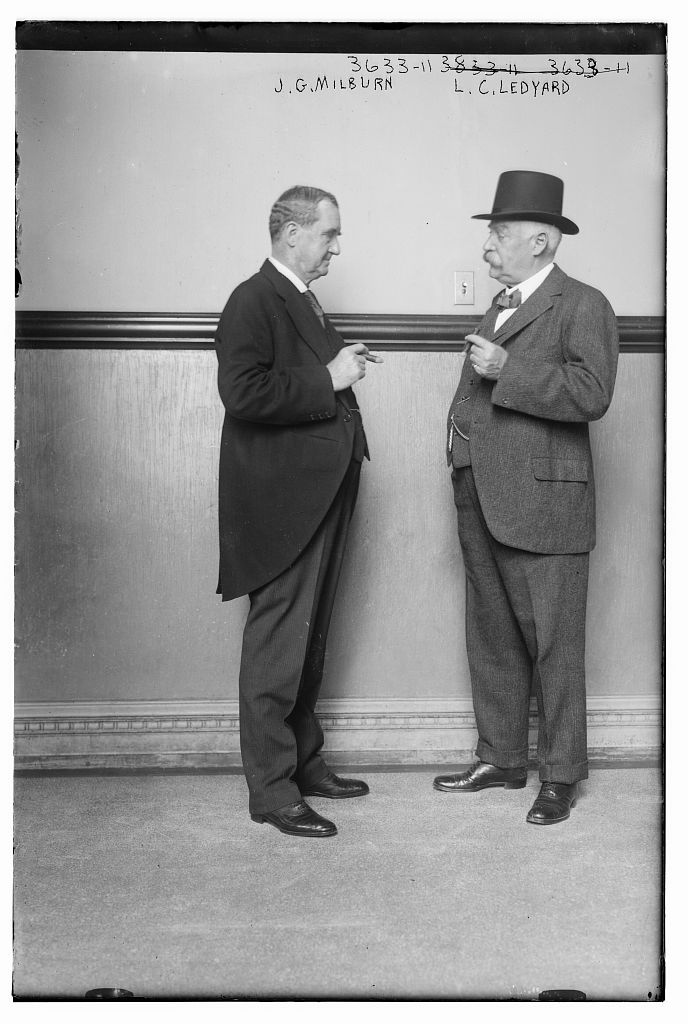
John George Milburn and Lewis Cass Ledyard in 1915

John George Milburn (December 14, 1851 – August 11, 1930) was an American lawyer. He was president of the New York City Bar Association and a partner of Carter Ledyard & Milburn.

== Early life ==
Milburn was born on December 14, 1851, near Sunderland, England, the son of a civil engineer. In his youth, he studied civil engineering at the insistence of his father. However, at the age of eighteen his sister wrote to him from Batavia, New York, urging him to emigrate to America, which he did the following year.

== Career ==
In 1867, Milburn arrived in Batavia to study law with the firm of Wakeman & Watson. Though he was initially denied entrance to the bar because he was not an American citizen, several influential acquaintances successfully petitioned the New York State Legislature for an exception based on his intention to seek citizenship. He was granted admission to the bar in 1874.

In 1876, the newly married Milburns moved to Buffalo, New York, which was developing as a major industrial city. He practiced law alone until 1879, when he formed the law firm of Sprague, Milburn & Sprague with Hon. E.C. Sprague and Henry W. Sprague. In 1882, after working for a year in Denver, Colorado, Milburn returned to Buffalo to form the law firm Rogers, Locke & Milburn, with Sherman Rogers and Francis Locke.

=== Citizen of Buffalo ===
Milburn was a prominent citizen of Buffalo, serving as president of the Buffalo Club, a member of the executive board of the Buffalo Public Library, and a trustee of the Erie County and City Hall in Buffalo. He was also a prominent Democrat and a personal friend of Grover Cleveland.

Milburn is perhaps best known as the President of the Pan-American Exposition, the 1901 World's Fair in Buffalo. He prepared a suite in his house to host President William McKinley, who was coming to the Exposition. After the president was shot and wounded by anarchist Leon Czolgosz at the Exposition on September 6, 1901, he was treated at the hospital and brought back to Milburn's home; he died there eight days later.

Because of the event, the house became a popular tourist site. After it passed out of the family, it was later adapted as a hotel; it was demolished in 1957.

=== Later career ===
In 1904, at the invitation of the prominent attorney Lewis Cass Ledyard, Milburn joined the New York City law firm of Carter, Rollins & Ledyard, which became Carter, Ledyard & Milburn upon his joining. There, Milburn represented many high-profile clients, including Standard Oil, the New York Stock Exchange, and the Metropolitan Street Railway. He also served as president of the New York City Bar Association from 1920 to 1921.

== Personal life ==
In 1875, Milburn married Mary Patty Stocking (d. 1930), a teacher at Bryan's Seminary and the daughter of farmers in Wyoming County. Together, they were the parents of three sons:

- Devereux Milburn (1881–1942), who married Nancy Gordon Steele (d. 1955) in 1913.
- John George Milburn, Jr. (1880–1932), also a lawyer.
- Ralph Milburn (b. 1888), who married Anne Scarborough Hollingsworth, daughter of William Hollingsworth in 1910.

Milburn died on August 11, 1930, aged 78, at Claridge's, while on a trip to London, England. His estate was worth $1,735,059 upon his death. John is buried at Locust Valley Cemetery, Locust Valley, New York.

=== Descendants ===
Through his son John Jr. he was the grandfather of Dorothy Milburn (1907–1985), who married Samuel Sloan Auchincloss, Jr. (1903–1991) (whom she divorced in 1938 and married Frank Ford Russell that same year and Saint-John Perse in 1958), and Patty Milburn (1910–1986), who married Edgar Stirling Auchincloss III (1909–2000), who founded the Country Club of Darien.
