= Lyme Regis Guildhall =

Municipal building in Lyme Regis, Dorset, England

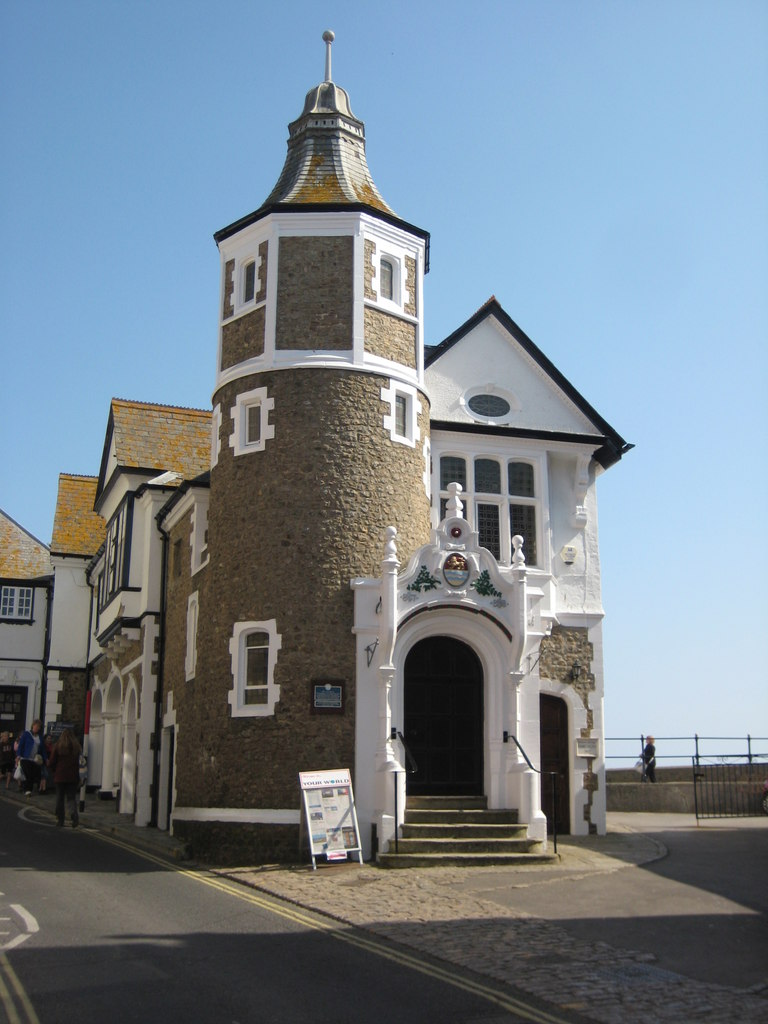
- Lyme Regis Guildhall

- Shown in Dorset
- 50.7249°N 2.9322°W
- Location: Bridge Street, Lyme Regis

History
- Built: 1889

Site notes
- Architect: George Vialls
- Architectural style: Italianate style

Listed Building – Grade II*
- Official name: The Guildhall
- Designated: 23 April 1952
- Reference no.: 1228691

Lyme Regis Guildhall is a municipal building in Bridge Street, Lyme Regis, Dorset, England. The building, which serves as the meeting place of Lyme Regis Town Council, is a Grade II* listed building.

== History ==
The first guildhall in Lyme Regis dated back to the 16th century. The Duke of Monmouth landed at Lyme Regis with 82 supporters, initiating the Monmouth Rebellion, on 11 June 1685. As his men marched through the town, one of his supporters, a blacksmith named "Jackson", tore down the door of the guildhall. Monmouth was defeated at the Battle of Sedgemoor on 6 July 1685 and was executed on 15 July 1685.

By the 1860s, the first guildhall was in a dilapidated condition and described as a "dingy cottage". The borough council decided to commission a new building. It was designed by George Vialls in the Italianate style, built in rubble masonry and stucco, and was officially opened by the mayor, Zachery Edwards, on 21 January 1889.

The design involved an asymmetrical main frontage of four bays facing onto Bridge Street. The left-hand bay, which was gabled, featured a carriageway on the left and a doorway on the right with a Venetian window on the first floor, all surmounted by a gable containing an oculus. The second and third bays were fenestrated by elliptically headed windows on the ground floor and by a paired sash window on the first floor, while the right-hand bay contained a round-headed doorway on the ground floor and a bay window on the first floor, all surmounted by a gable. To the right of the main frontage, there was a doorway giving access to the lock-up, and, at the right-hand corner, a three-stage round tower with a conical roof. There was a doorway with an elaborate hood mould and finials at the west end of the building. Internally, the principal room was the council chamber. A stone carved with the Royal coat of arms of King Charles II, which had been recovered from the first guildhall, was installed above the mayor's seat.

The guildhall continued to serve as the local seat of government until the enlarged West Dorset District Council was formed in 1974. It subsequently became the meeting place of Lyme Regis Town Council. A plaque commemorating the life of Sir George Somers, who had served as mayor and local member of parliament in the 17th century, was unveiled by Princess Alexandra, as part of celebrations for the 700th anniversary of the granting of the town's charter, on 8 May 1984.

Remedial works were carried out to reduce the projection of the bay window by 9 inches (230 mm), in February 2022, in an effort to reduce the number of times it was struck by passing lorries.

== See also ==
- Grade II* listed buildings in West Dorset
