= St Andrew's Church, Minterne Magna =

Church in Dorset, England

St Andrew's Church
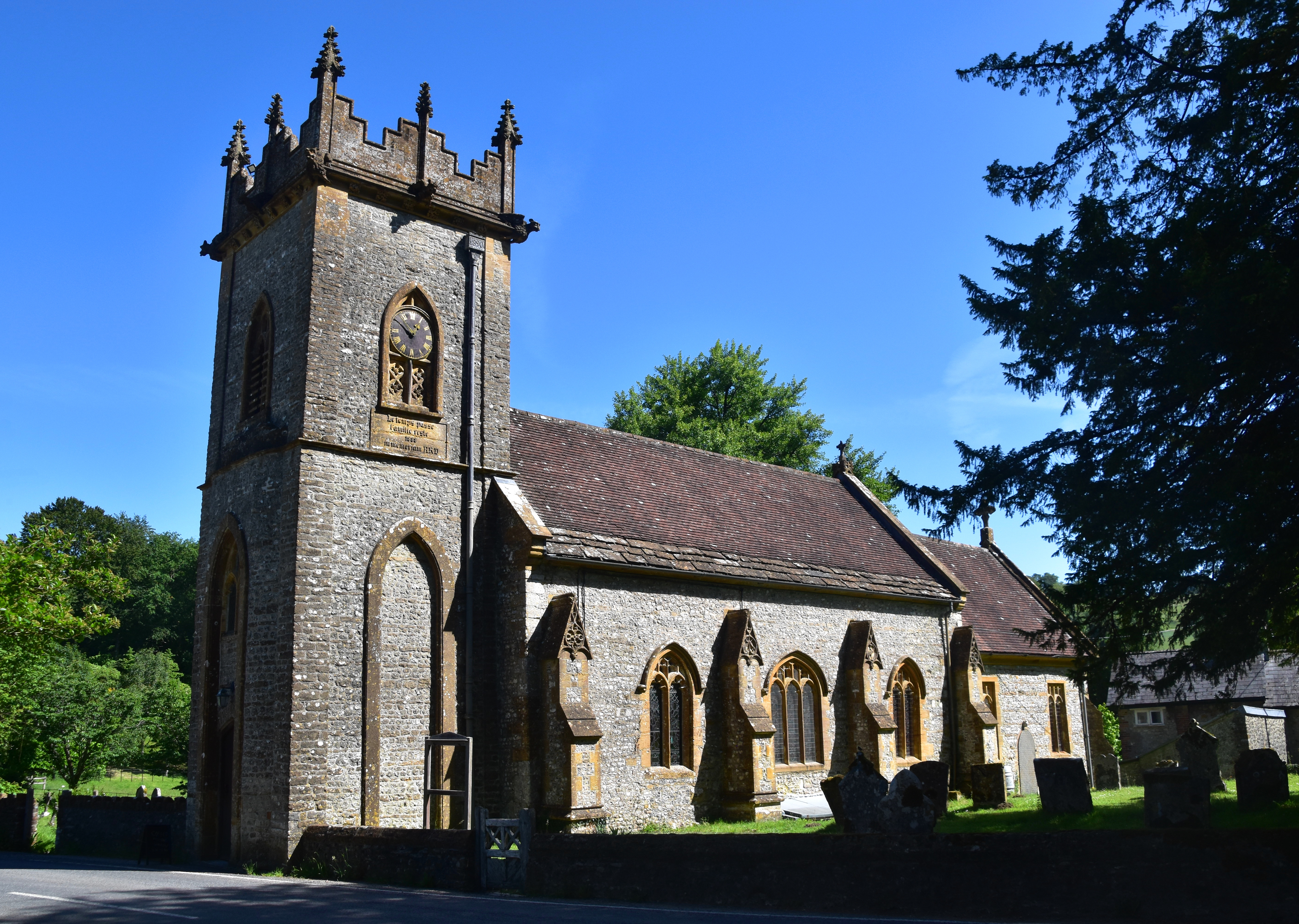

Religion
- Affiliation: Church of England
- Ecclesiastical or organizational status: Active

Location
- Location: Minterne Magna, Dorset, England
- Interactive map of St Andrew's Church
- Coordinates: 50.8375°N 2.4848°W

Architecture
- Type: Church

St Andrew's Church is a Church of England parish church at Minterne Magna, Dorset, England. The church has 15th century origins and is a Grade II* listed building.

== History ==
St Andrew's Church has 15th century origins, with the nave and chancel dating to this period. The north chapel was added in the early 17th century. The vault of the Napier family was added on the east side of the chapel in the late 17th century. In 1800, alterations were carried out to the church, which included rebuilding the tower and enlarging the building. The chancel and north chapel were restored at the expense of Henry Sturt of Crichel House in the mid-19th century.

In 1873, the church's barrel organ, built by J. W. Walker & Sons Ltd of London, was enlarged and converted into a finger organ by Rogers and Woodford of Weymouth. In 1875, the Digby family vault in the churchyard was restored by local builder J. Northover of Cerne Abbas. The same year saw a stained glass window made by Heaton, Butler and Bayne of London added to the east side of the church in memory of Lady Digby, who died in 1874. The tower was restored and heightened in 1894, and the church was reseated in 1897. A memorial window to Lady Caroline Kerrison was installed in 1896, followed by one for Theresa Digby in 1897.

On 9 March 1920, the Bishop of Salisbury, Frederick Ridgeway, consecrated the new churchyard and dedicated a marble war memorial tablet erected on the wall inside the church. The memorial was made by Appleby and Childs of Yeovil. In 1933, a stained glass window made by Archibald Keightley Nicholson of London was installed on the south side of the church in memory of Lord and Lady Digby by their three sons and three daughters. Both central heating and electric lighting were installed in the church in 1939. The church was re-roofed in about 1957.

A restoration carried out in 1963 saw the installation of a new organ and the reordering of the church. The new organ was given by members of the Digby family in memory of Robert Henry Digby, who died in 1959. It was built by George Osmond and Co of Taunton and the organ case was designed by Kenneth Wiltshire of Potter and Hare of Salisbury. The organ was installed in the gallery rather than in the former organ's position at the east end of the church. It was dedicated by the Bishop of Salisbury, Joe Fison, on 30 November 1963. The project also saw the choir stalls, now disused, removed, the pulpit turned around, the brass lectern moved to the other side of the church, the altar brought forward, and the walls redecorated.

== Architecture ==
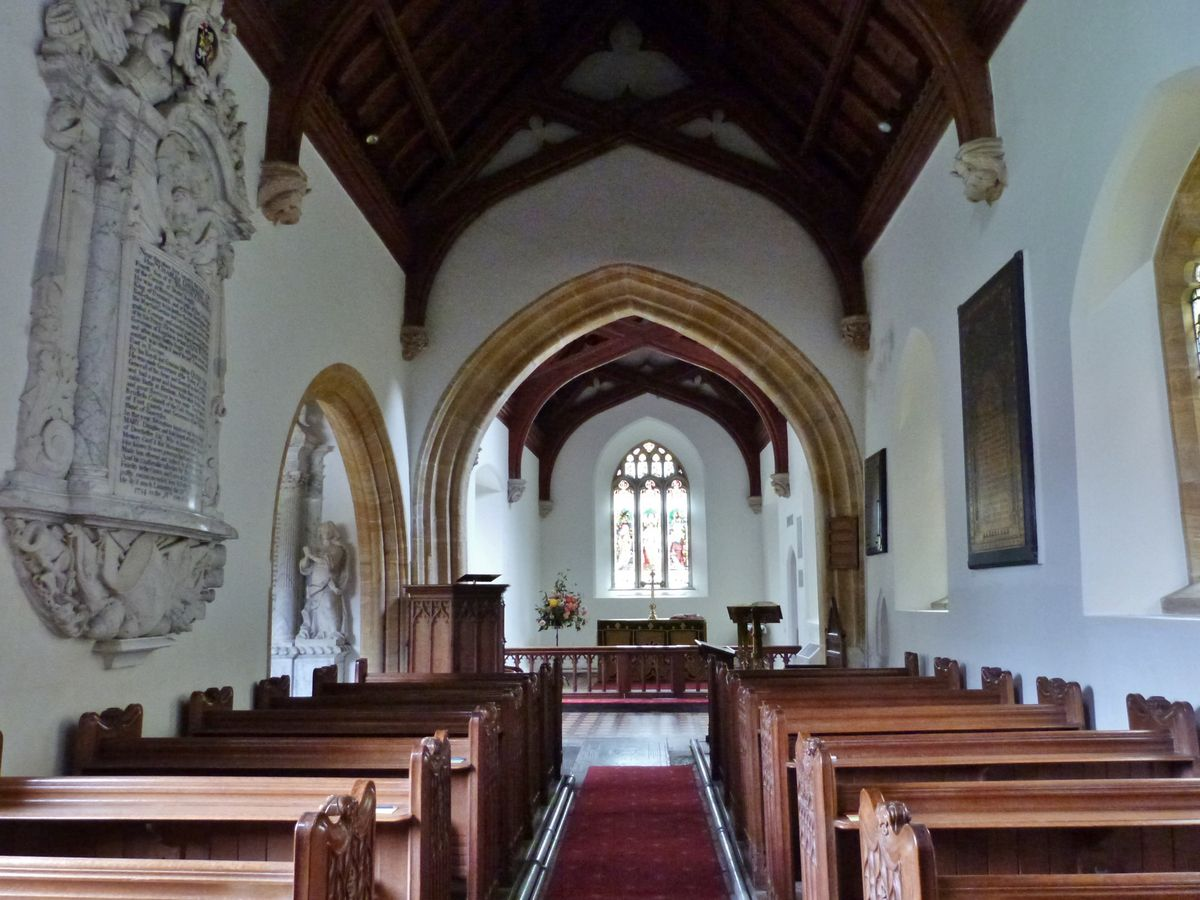
The interior of St Andrew's Church.

St Andrew's Church is built of local rubble and flint stone, with ashlar dressings of Ham Hill stone, and roofs of tiles and stone slates. It is made up of a nave, chancel, north chapel and a two-stage west tower. The tower contains two late medieval bells, one inscribed "Sancta Maria ora pro nobis" and the other inscribed "Sancta Elisabet ora pro nobis". The north chapel contains numerous monuments to the Napier family, who were Lords of the Manor from c. 1600 to 1765. The nave includes monuments to General Charles Churchill, who died in 1714, and Sir Henry Digby, Admiral of the Blue, who died in 1842. The font is a 15th century octagonal bowl on a modern base.
