= St Mary's Church, Bradford Peverell =

Church in Dorset, England

St Mary's Church
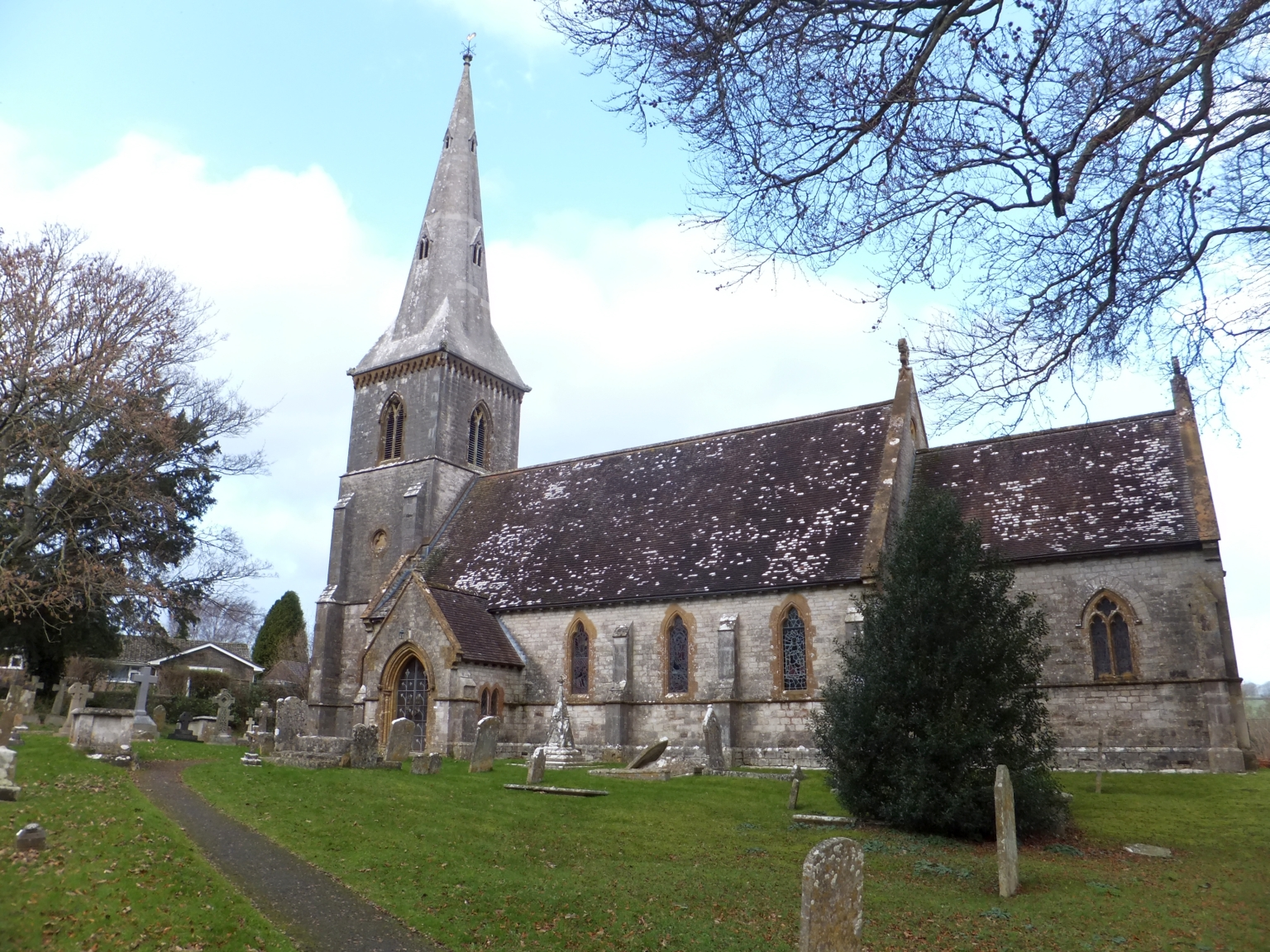

Religion
- Affiliation: Church of England
- Ecclesiastical or organisational status: Active
- Year consecrated: 1850

Location
- Location: Bradford Peverell, Dorset, England
- Interactive map of St Mary's Church
- Coordinates: 50.7358°N 2.4859°W

Architecture
- Architect: Decimus Burton
- Type: Church
- Style: Early English

St Mary's Church is a Church of England parish church in Bradford Peverell, Dorset, England. It was designed by Decimus Burton and built in 1849–50. The church is a Grade II* listed building.

In the churchyard is Bradford Peverell's war memorial which contains the names of those who fell in both World Wars. It was completed and erected in January 1921 and is made of Dartmoor granite. It became a Grade II listed monument in 2015.

== History ==
St Mary's was built to replace an earlier church which had fallen into a dilapidated condition. The original church was small and ancient, made up of a nave, chancel, south aisle and porch, with a wooden turret containing three bells. The decision to rebuild the church had been made by 1847, when early drawings for a new church were made by Decimus Burton and an estimate of the construction costs made by the local builder John Wellspring of Dorchester.

Burton finalised his plans in 1848 and a faculty was granted in 1849 for the old church to be demolished and the new one to be built on the same site. The majority of the cost of the new church was paid for by the Lord of the Manor, Hastings Nathaniel Middleton of Wollaston House. Construction was carried out by John Wellspring and St Mary's was consecrated by the Bishop of Salisbury, the Right Rev. Edward Denison, on 28 October 1850.

The church's organ was installed in 1888. It was built by Bishop and Son of London. The churchyard was extended around 1888 and again around 1955.

== Architecture ==
St Mary's is built of coarse ashlar with ashlar dressings and clay tiled roofs. It is made up of a five-bay nave, a two-bay chancel, a three-stage west tower (with an octagonal broach spire of Portland stone), a north vestry and south porch. The pulpit and font are of 19th-century date. The tower has five bells, one of which was cast by Thomas Purdue in 1674, and two which were added in 1897.

Some of the old church's fittings and memorials were transferred to the new church. The west tower has a marble tablet made by Lester of Dorchester in memory of the rector Rev. Middleton Onslow, dated 1837. Floor slabs in the nave include those to John Jobbins, dated 1696, Thomas Meggs, dated 1696, another Thomas Meggs, dated c. 1698, Harry Meggs, dated 1702 and another Harry Meggs, dated 1782. The Royal coat of arms of Queen Victoria is placed over the tower arch and inside the tower are two stools and a table, all dating to the 17th century.

The chancel's east window was created using fragments of 13th and 14th-century glass received from the chapel at New College, Oxford. When the glass was removed from the New College chapel, it was stored in a box. On 25 May 1850, Hastings Nathaniel Middleton visited Oxford to inspect the glass, which had been offered to him by the warden of the college for use in the new church at Bradford Peverell. The north window uses fragments sourced from the old church and containing the coat of arms and motto of Bishop William of Wykeham.

In the chancel is a marble tablet to the rector Rev. H. Blackstone Williams, dated 1879. In the nave are brass tablets in memory of Frank Middleton, a captain in the Dorset Regiment, dated 1915, Ernest Middleton, Second Lieutenant, Queen's Own Dorset Yeomanry, dated 1917, Captain Thomas Winwood, M.C, Royal Field Artillery, dated 1919, and Walter Middleton, dated 1931. There are also memorial windows to members of the Middleton family, one to Lieutenant Edward Williams, who fell in the Sudan campaign, and one to Vice-Admiral Sir Robert O'Brien FitzRoy.

In the churchyard are four table tombs which became Grade II listed in 1985. Three belong to the Dearing family, all dating to the second half of the 17th-century, including one to Luke Dearing the Elder, dated 1666. The other belongs to Hastings Nathaniel Middleton, who died in 1821.
