= Wraxall Manor =

Manor house in Wraxall, Dorset, England

Coordinates: 50.8082°N 2.6167°W

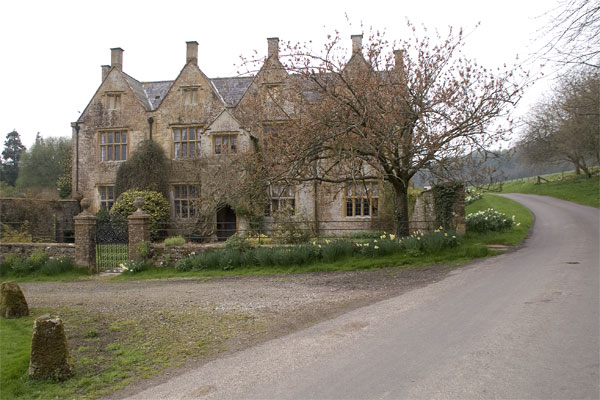
Wraxall Manor

Wraxall Manor is a grade II* listed manor house in Wraxall, Dorset, England. The house was built in about 1630, probably for William Lawrence.
