= The King's Arms, Dorchester =

Pub and hotel in Dorchester, Dorset, England

Coordinates: 50.7157°N 2.4359°W

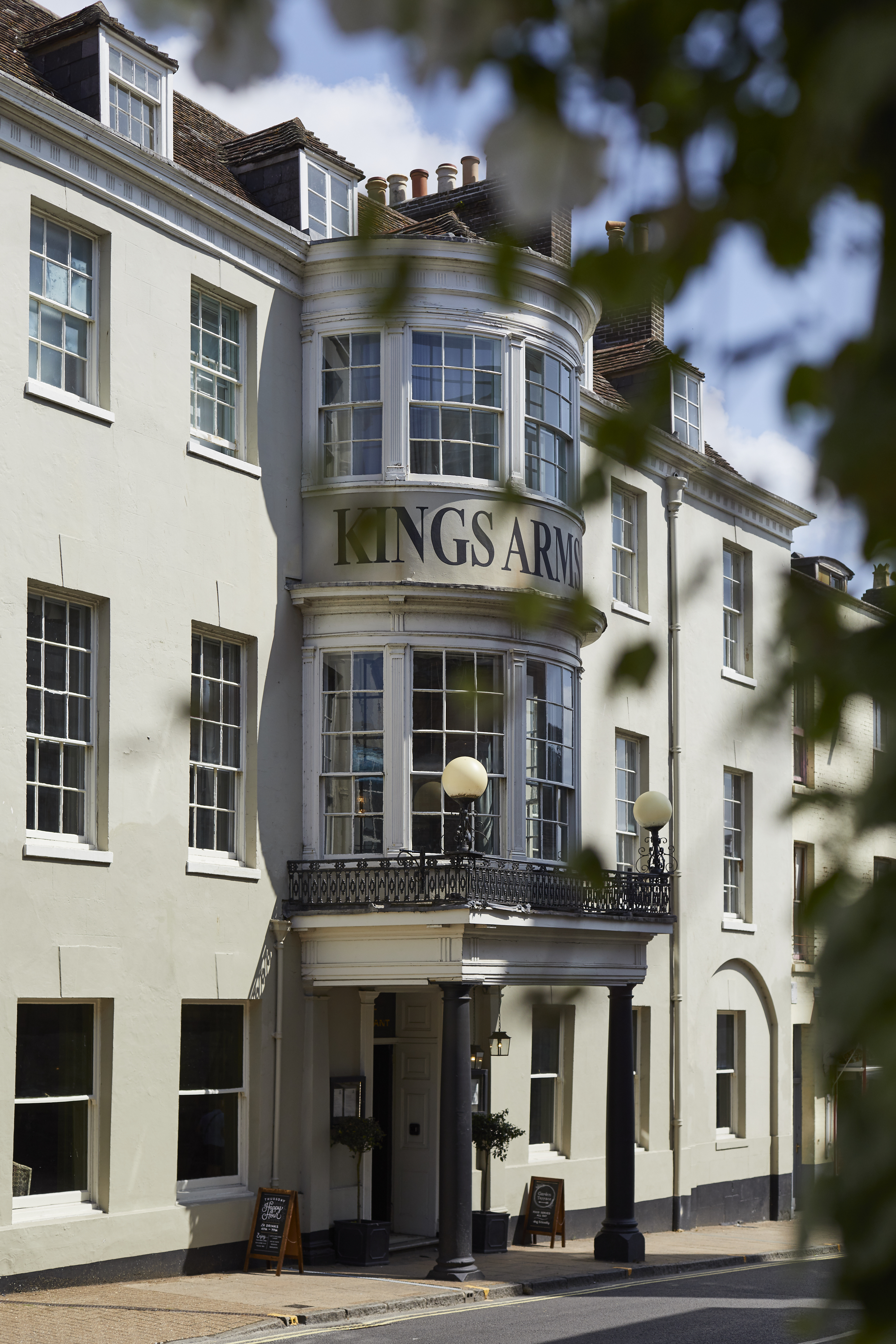
The King's Arms, Dorchester, Dorset

The King's Arms is a pub, restaurant and hotel in Dorchester, Dorset. It is grade II* listed. The Buildings of England describes its frontage as a "fine expansive...composition", with an attached assembly room. It is a former coaching inn and existed by the late eighteenth century.

It was bought and refurbished by The Stay Original Company, a Somerset-based operator of West Country hotels, and reopened in 2021.

It features in Thomas Hardy's novel, The Mayor of Casterbridge; Casterbridge was Hardy's fictionalised name for Dorchester.
