= St Bartholomew's Chapel, Corton =

Chapel in Dorset, England

St Bartholomew's Chapel
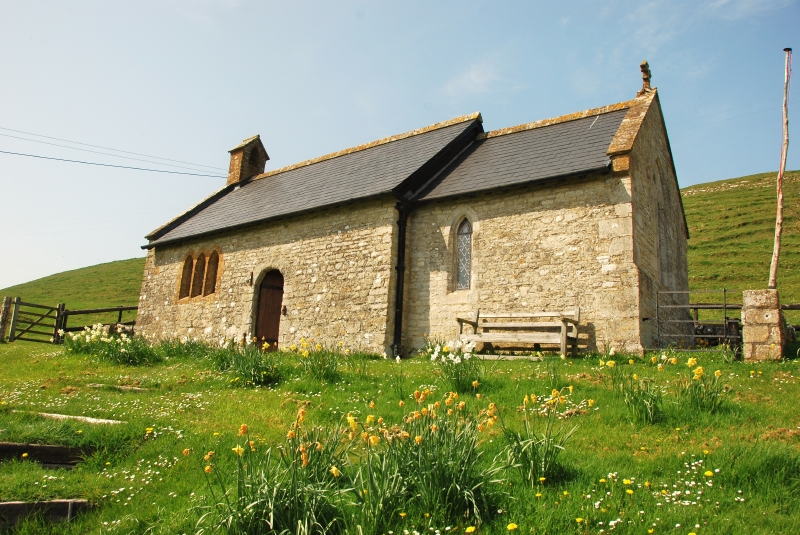

Religion
- Affiliation: Church of England
- Ecclesiastical or organizational status: Active
- Year consecrated: 1897

Location
- Location: Corton, Weymouth, Dorset, England
- Interactive map of St Bartholomew's Chapel
- Coordinates: 50.6678°N 2.5165°W

Architecture
- Type: Church

St Bartholomew's Chapel is a Church of England chapel in Corton, near Weymouth, Dorset, England. The chapel has early 13th century origins, with later rebuilds and a restoration of 1897. It is a Grade II* listed building.

== History ==
St Bartholomew's has origins to the early 13th century, with the chancel dating to this period. The nave was rebuilt in the 16th century. The building later served as a free chapel for a time but during the 19th century became used as a barn by the nearby Corton Farm. The altar was painted by Henry Joseph Moule in September 1886.

In 1897, the chapel underwent restoration which included rebuilding the west side of the nave. The building was reconsecrated by the Church of England that year as a chapel of ease to the parish church of St Peter in Portesham.

The chapel no longer holds regular services, but is used for approximately five special services each year. It now forms part of the circuit known as Chesil Churches.

== Architecture ==
St Bartholomew's is built of coursed rubble stone with ashlar dressings and slate roofs. It is made up of a chancel and nave. Both the bell-cote on the west gable and stone cross-crosslet on the east gable are 20th-century additions. The three-light windows of the nave's west and south walls are 20th century. The chancel's east window dates to the late 14th century.

Internal fittings of note include a stone altar of early 13th-century origin, which sits on a base of Purbeck Marble. In the chancel are two 15th-century moulded stone corbels, as well as a piscina dating to the 13th century but since restored. The chancel floor has eighteen re-set tiles of medieval origin.
