= Bradford Peverell =

Village in Dorset, England

Coordinates: 50.7361°N 2.485°W

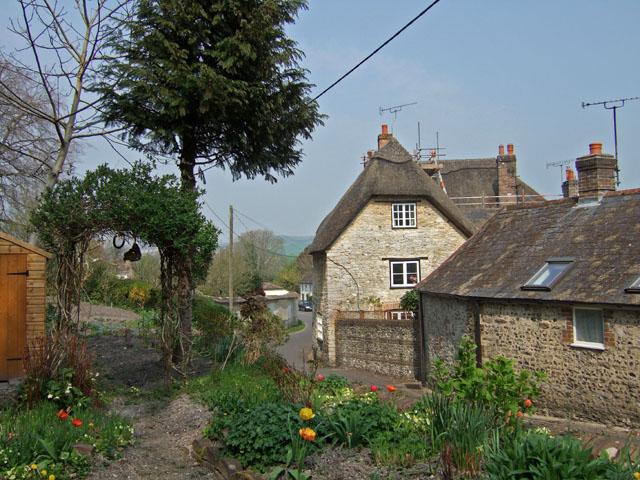
- Bradford Peverell

- Location within Dorset
- Population: 357 (2021)
- OS grid reference: SY658930
- Unitary authority: Dorset
- Ceremonial county: Dorset
- Region: South West
- Country: England
- Sovereign state: United Kingdom
- Post town: Dorchester
- Postcode district: DT2
- Police: Dorset
- Fire: Dorset and Wiltshire
- Ambulance: South Western
- UK Parliament: West Dorset

Bradford Peverell is a village and civil parish in the English county of Dorset, 2 miles (3.2 km) north-west of the county town Dorchester. It is sited by the south bank of the River Frome, among low chalk hills on the dip slope of the Dorset Downs. The A37 road between Dorchester and Yeovil passes to the north of the village on the other side of the river's water meadows. In the 2011 census the population of the parish (which includes the hamlet of Muckleford to the north-west) was 357.

Historian John Hutchins was born in Bradford Peverell in 1698. His work on the history of the county, History and Antiquities of the County of Dorset, was published in 1774.

In the 1st century a Roman aqueduct ran through where the village is now sited. It followed a line from Notton, a few miles upstream, to Dorchester, which then was the Roman town of Durnovaria. The remaining sections of the aqueduct are a scheduled monument.

St Mary's parish church is a grade II* listed building. In 1850 it was rebuilt in a 13th/14th-century style, though various fittings and monuments were retained from the earlier building. The new design was by Decimus Burton.

The Frome Valley Trail long-distance footpath runs through the village.
