= Osmington =

Village and civil parish in Dorset, England

Coordinates: 50.6458°N 2.3906°W

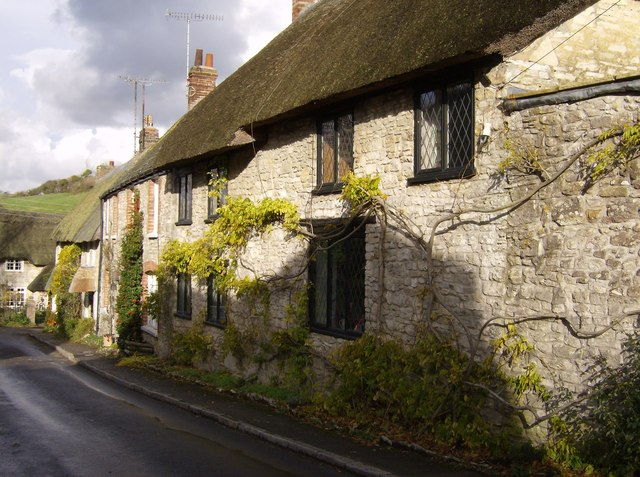
- High Street, Osmington

- Location within Dorset
- Population: 673
- OS grid reference: SY725829
- Unitary authority: Dorset
- Ceremonial county: Dorset
- Region: South West
- Country: England
- Sovereign state: United Kingdom
- Post town: WEYMOUTH
- Postcode district: DT3
- Dialling code: 01305
- Police: Dorset
- Fire: Dorset and Wiltshire
- Ambulance: South Western
- UK Parliament: South Dorset

Osmington is a village and civil parish within Dorset, England, situated on the Jurassic Coast 4 miles (6.4 km) north-east of Weymouth. In the 2011 census the parish—which includes the small settlements of Upton, Ringstead and Osmington Mills—had a population of 673.

== History ==
Evidence exists of Bronze Age settlement in the area. The village's written history, however, begins in 940, when it is mentioned in a charter.

The oldest building in the village is the church, St. Osmund's, which was originally built in 1170, but has had alterations up to the 19th century. Residential buildings in the village date back to the 16th century.

To the northwest of the village, on White Horse Hill, is the Osmington White Horse, a large hill figure dating from 1808. It represents King George III.

John Constable (1776–1837), the leading English landscape artist, spent his honeymoon here in October 1816 and painted views of the local area. The Victoria and Albert Museum Catalogue of the Constable collection (Reynolds, G.(1973), HMSO, London) has in it 6 drawings of Osmington, Osmington Bay, Weymouth Bay and Portland as well as an oil painting of Weymouth Bay on millboard, thought to be an open-air sketch from his time on honeymoon. While in Osmington, Constable stayed at the home of his friend Rev. John Fisher, who had performed the wedding ceremony between Constable and his wife Maria Bicknell. Constable also drew 'View of Osmington and the Downs with the figure of George III on horseback at Sutton Poyntz'(Lot 93 in the Gregory sale, 20 July 1949).

Talbot Hughes (1869–1942), the painter, collector and writer, lived in Osmington from 1913 until his death in 1942. He was buried on 9 February 1942 in the churchyard at St. Osmund's.

War memorial bus shelter

The village has an unusual thatched bus shelter built in local stone. It was erected as a war memorial in memory of David Edward Parry-Jones, Lieutenant 1st Battalion The Rifle Brigade, who died in action near Caen on 3 August 1944. The shelter was listed as a war memorial by Osmington Parish Council in 2018.

== Economy ==
The coast near Osmington, looking westwards

Osmington's economy was primarily agricultural until after the mid-20th century. With the decline in agricultural employment in the area, the village's character changed and it is now primarily occupied by people whose work is elsewhere. Whereas previously, several shops and tradesmen were in the village, by the end of the 20th century, no shop remained, most tradesmen had disappeared, and the village pub had been closed. In 2025 it was announced the local pub, would reopen in 2026 after extensive reconstruction with added holiday flats under its original name of the Sunray. The village hall acts as central point for community events and is run by a local committee. Despite the loss of local employment, the village, which at the end of World War II was so poor that large sections were condemned, has become affluent with a high proportion of professional and managerial residents (38.4% compared to a county average of 26.1% in 2001). A PGL activity centre is located on the coast.

== See also ==
- Osmington Oolite
