= Winterborne Herringston =

Hamlet in Dorset, England

Coordinates: 50°41′30″N 2°26′29″W

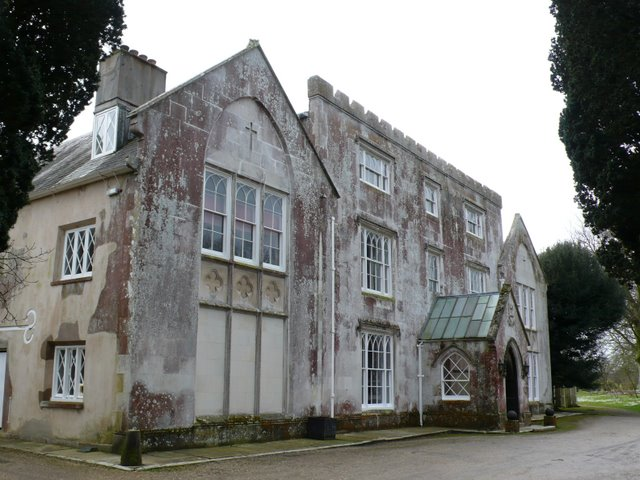
Herringston House, north front

Winterborne Herringston, also Winterbourne Herringston, is a small civil parish and hamlet containing about 600 acres in Dorset, England, 1.4 miles south of Dorchester. The only significant structure is Herringston House, a Grade II* listed 14th-century manor house which has been the home of the Williams family since 1513.

The name is derived from the small river Winterborne or Winterbourne and from the family of Herring, the mediaeval owners.

It was originally part of the parish of the abandoned village of Winterborne Farringdon, and from the 17th to the 19th century of Winterborne Came. Ecclesiastically it is now included in the parish of Winterborne Monkton.
