= Herringston House =

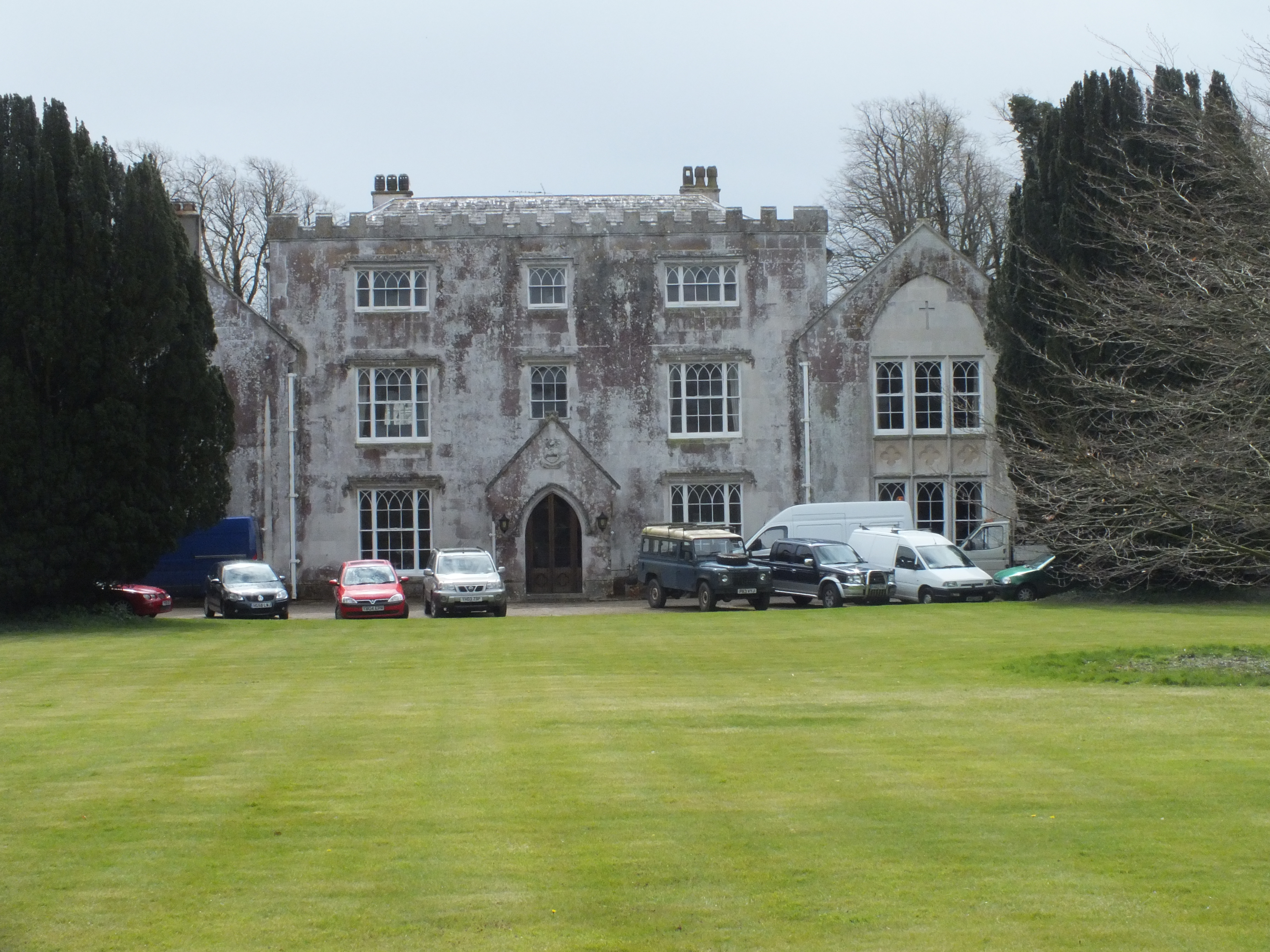
- Herringston House North Front

- Location within Dorset
- 50°41′30″N 2°26′29″W
- Type: Manor house
- Location: Winterborne Herringston

Site notes
- Area: Dorset
- Architectural styles: Medieval and Tudor
- Owner: Williams Family

Listed Building – Grade II*
- Official name: Herringston House
- Designated: 26 January 1956
- Reference no.: 1119179

Listed Building – Grade II
- Official name: Stables Immediately East of Herringston House
- Designated: 27 October 1986
- Reference no.: 1154299

Herringston House is a Grade II* listed Tudor manor house in Winterborne Herringston in Dorset, England.

== Architecture and history ==
There are remains of the 14th-century manor house of Walterus Heryng de Winterborne, who was granted a licence to crenellate in 1336, at the core of the current building, although some of this was removed in the 19th century and none of the remains are visible. The house's next major phase began in 1569, when Sir John Williams inherited the estate. He greatly embellished and altered the building, giving it much of its present character and beginning its famous great chamber (which was unfinished at his death in 1617). Alterations were carried out in the late 19th century by Thomas Leverton, leading to the remodelling of the north (entrance) front and the creation of a new entrance hall. A chapel was pulled down during these. Later in the 19th century, a porch was added to the north front and in 1899 a large east wing was added, alongside a conservatory and outbuildings to the west.

The stables are 18th century with 19th-century alterations.

== Owners ==
The house has been owned by the Williams family since 1513. The current family head is Raymond Audley Edward Wilmot Williams.

== Gallery ==
=== Exterior ===
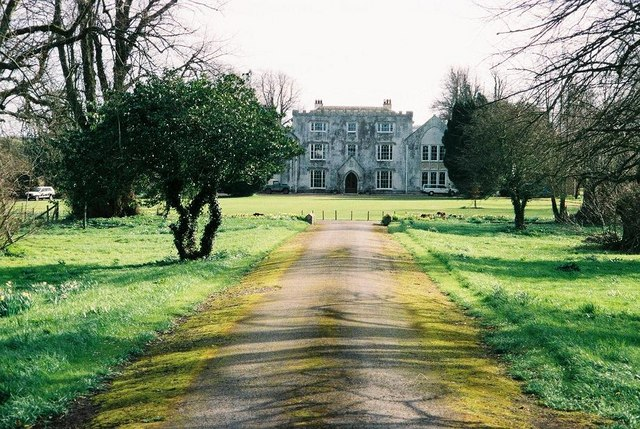
Herringston House from its entrance avenue.

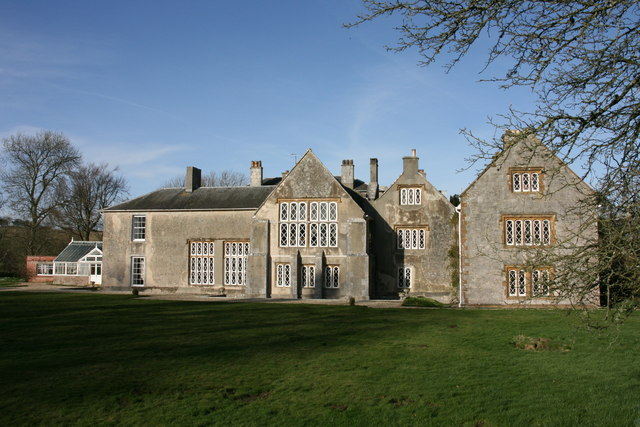
Herringston House from the south.

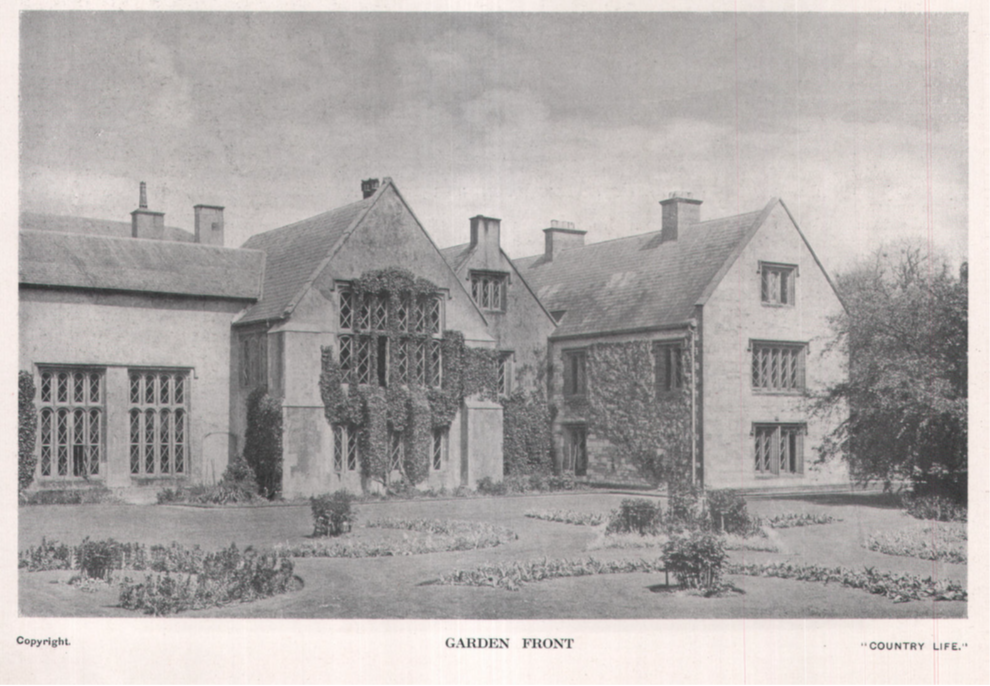
Herringston House from the South, 1913.

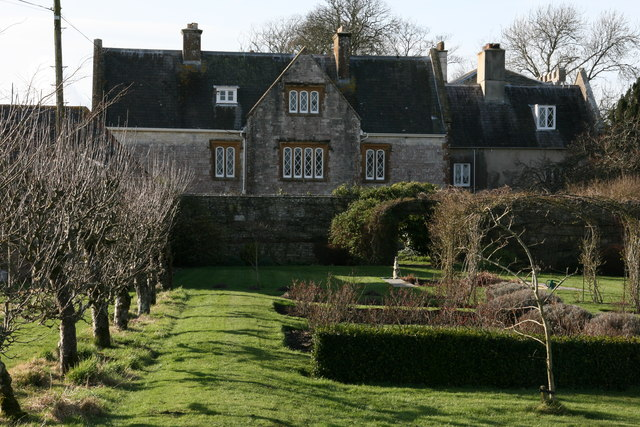
Herringston House from the east, taken from within its walled garden.

=== Interior ===
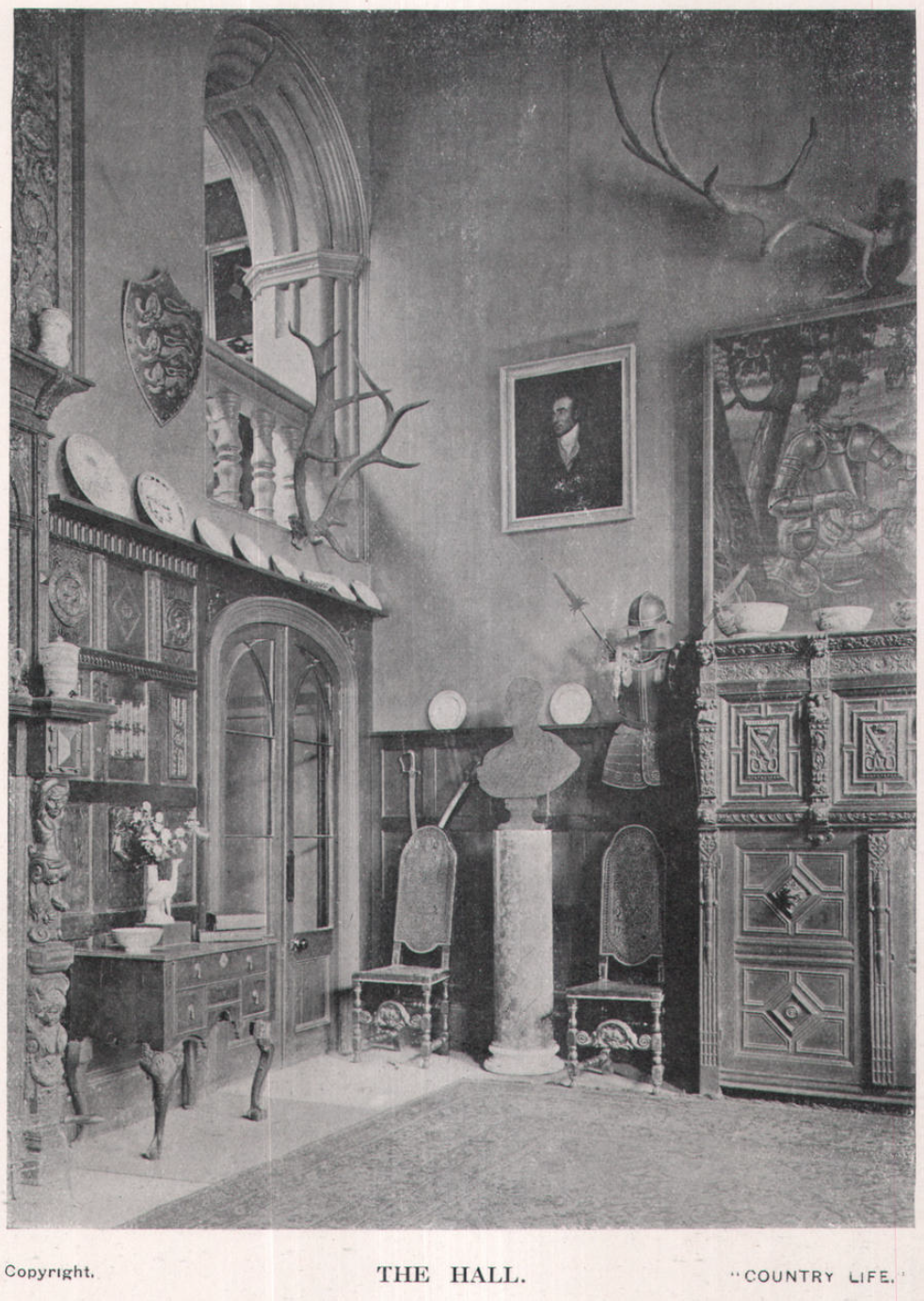
The Hall, 1913.

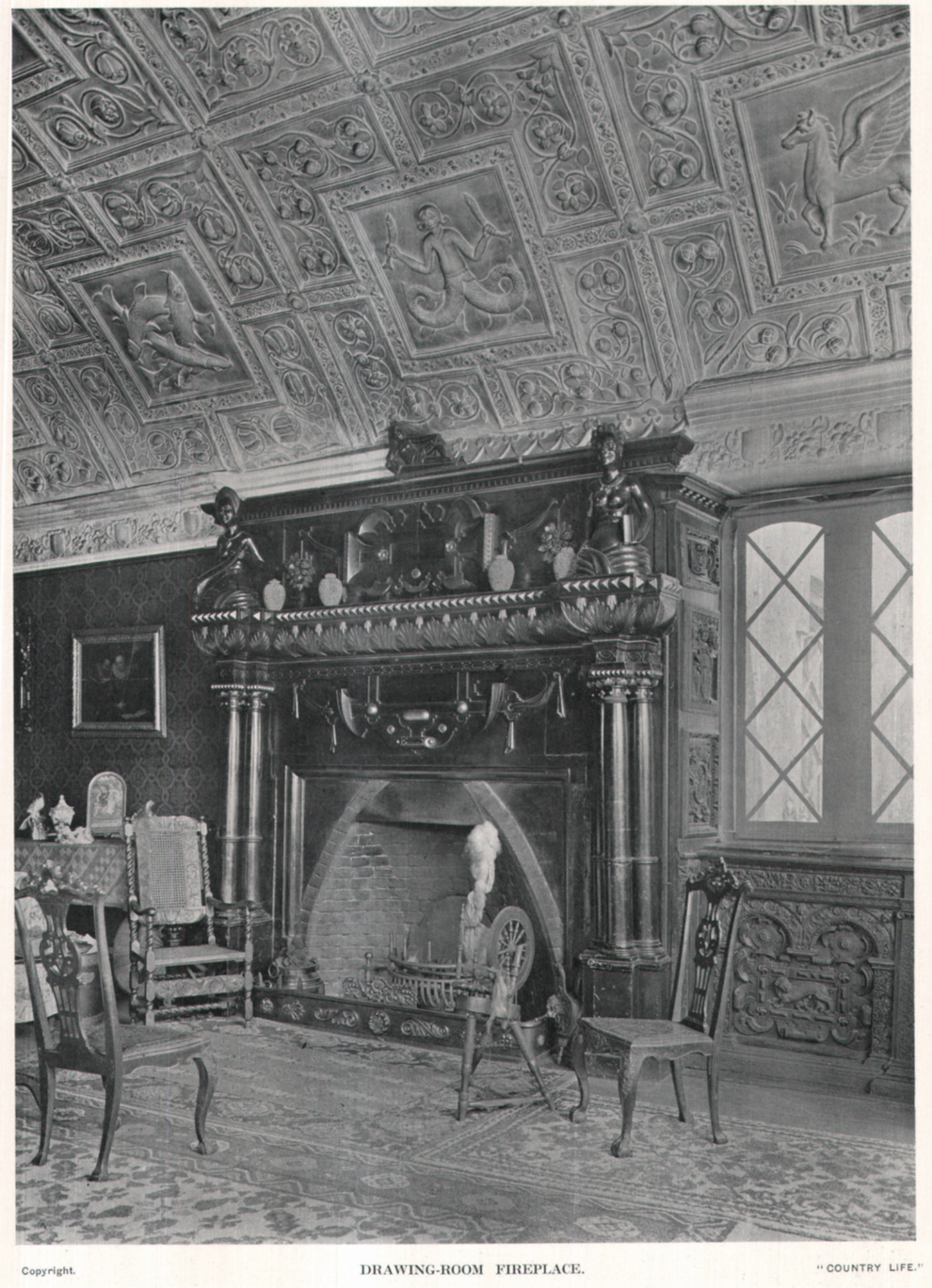
The Great Chamber, looking North-East, 1913.

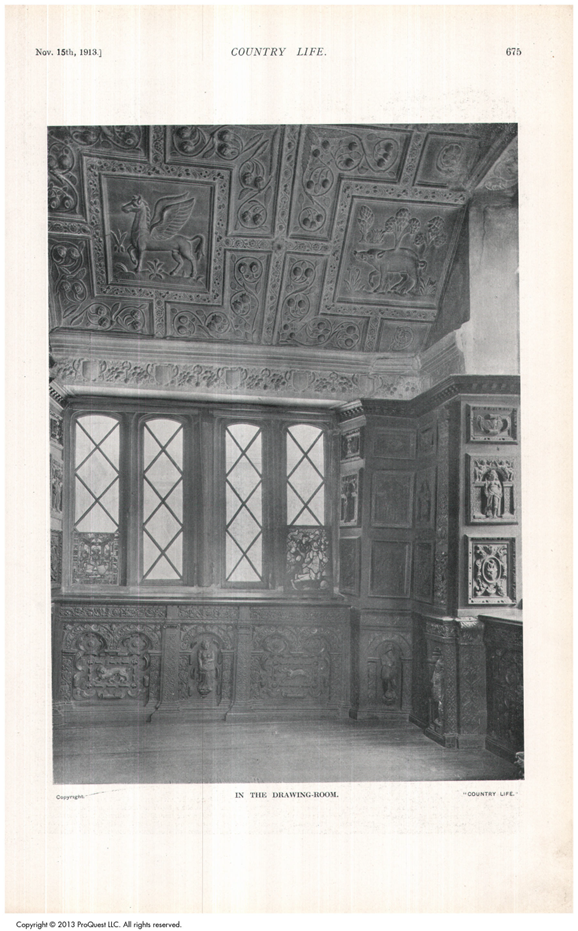
The South of the Great Chamber, looking East, 1913.

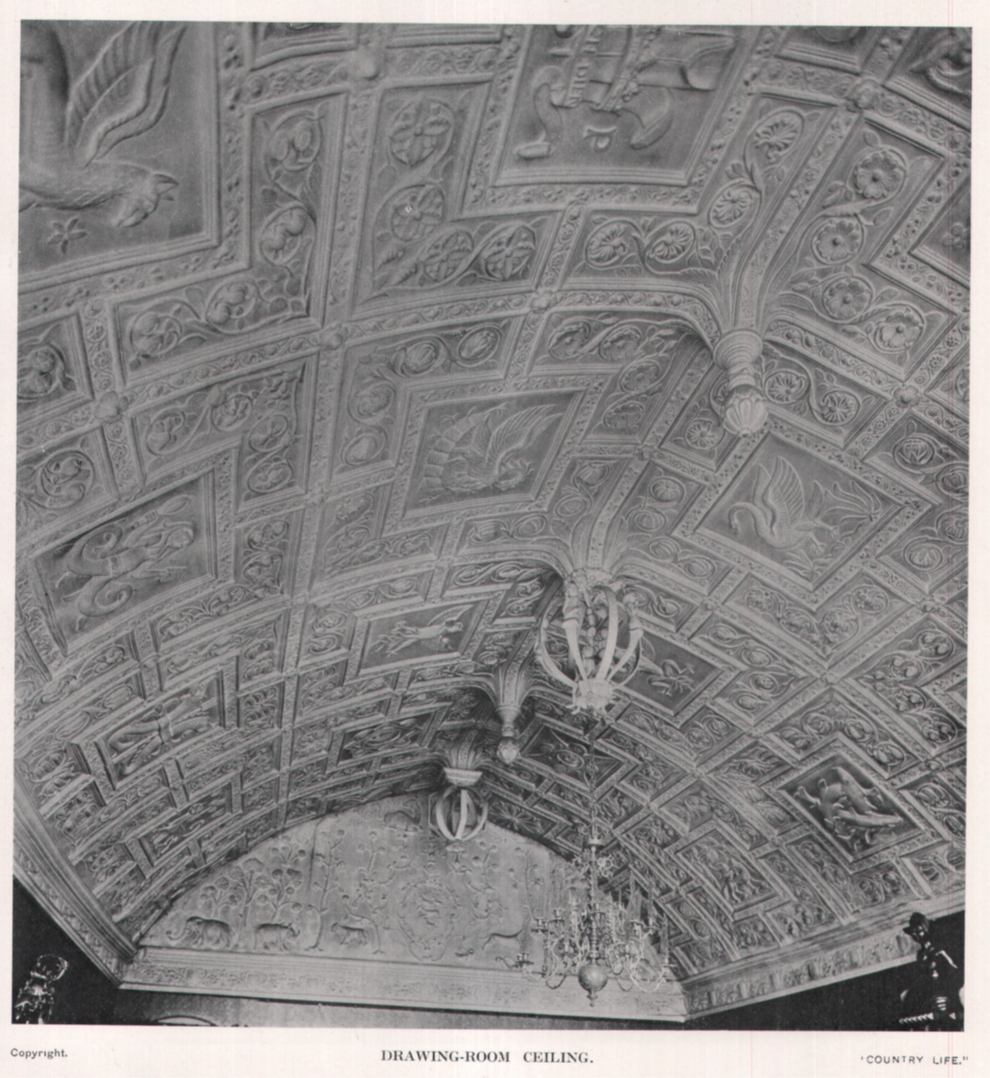
The ceiling in the Great Chamber, 1913.

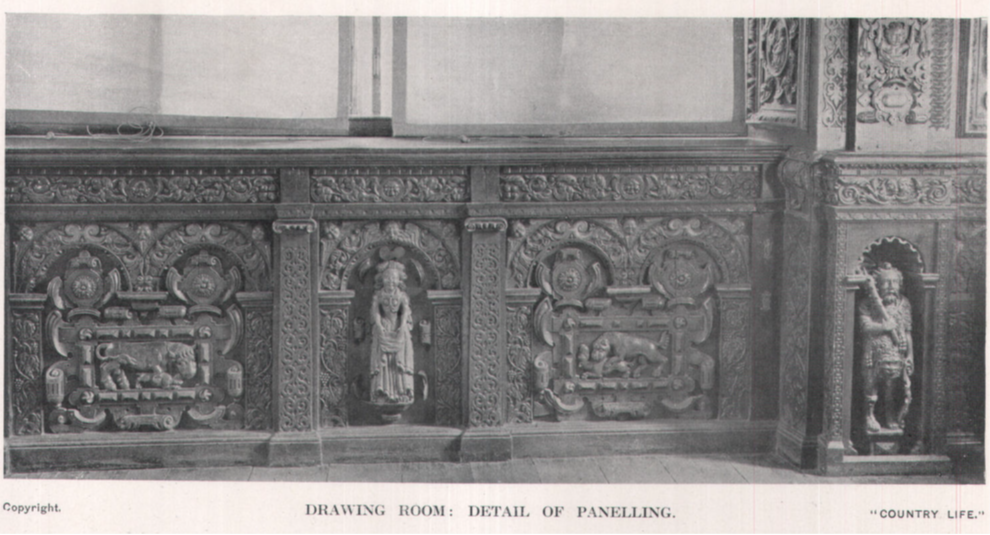
A detail of the panelling in the Great Chamber, 1913.

=== Maps ===
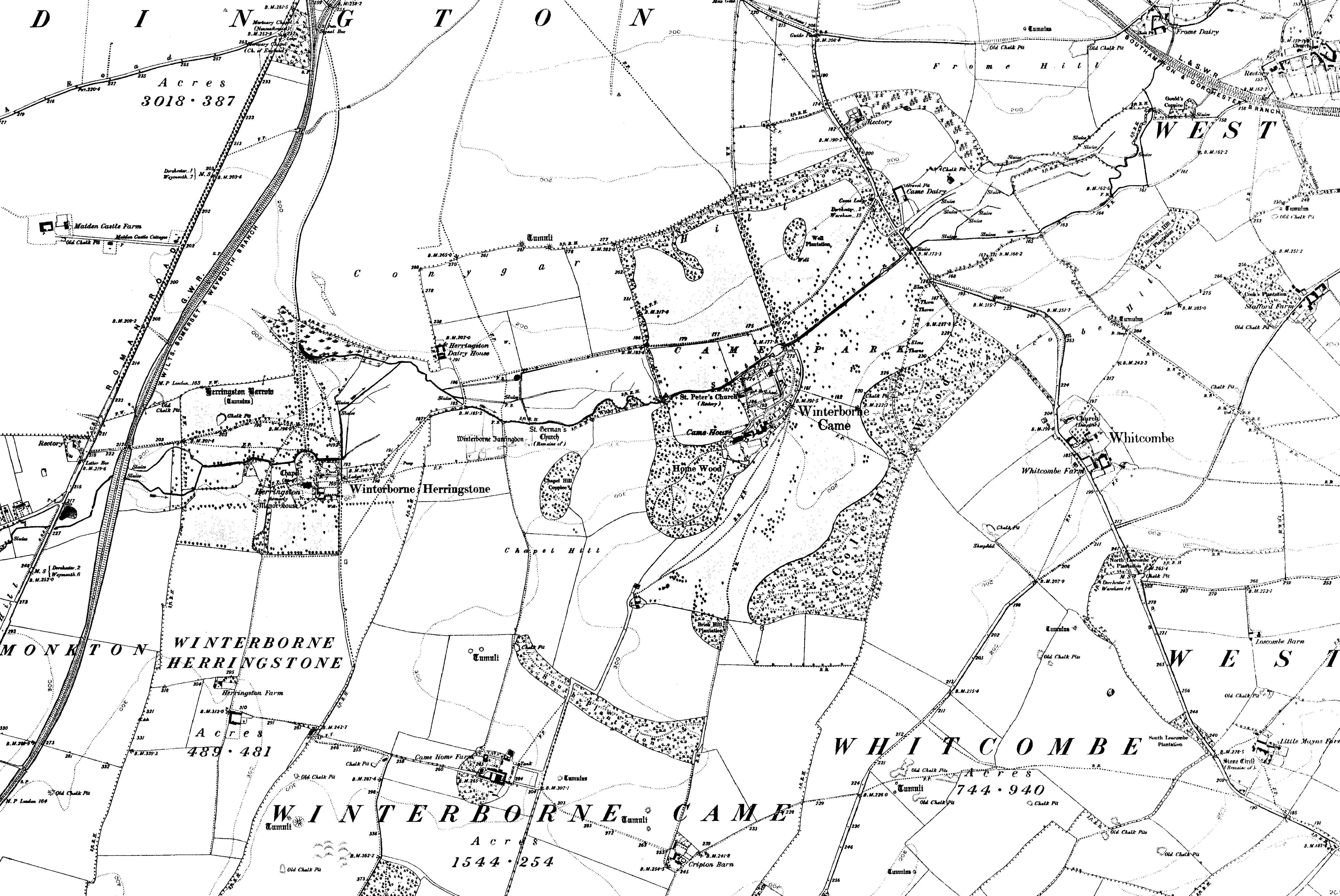
Herringston House (to the left) on an Ordnance Survey map from 1888-1892.
