= St Osmund's Church, Osmington =

Church building in Osmington, England

St Osmund's Church
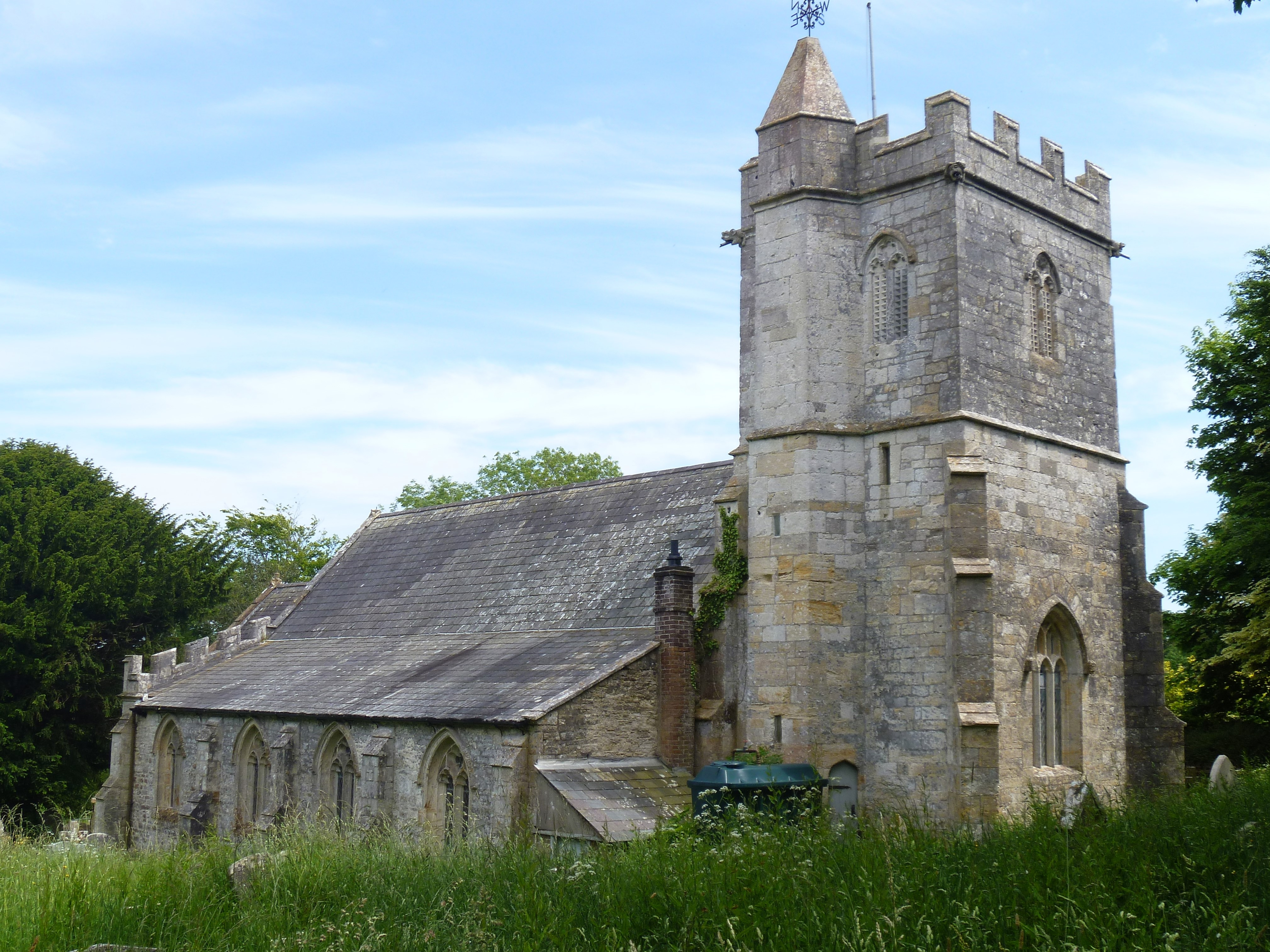

Religion
- Affiliation: Church of England
- Ecclesiastical or organizational status: Active

Location
- Location: Osmington, Dorset, England
- Interactive map of St Osmund's Church
- Coordinates: 50.6458°N 2.3914°W

Architecture
- Architect: Benjamin Ferrey
- Type: Church

St Osmund's Church is a Church of England parish church in Osmington, Dorset, England. It is a Grade II* listed building.

== History ==
Much of the church dates to a rebuild in the mid-19th century, but there are a number of earlier features. The chancel arch has been dated to c. 1200, the nave's north arcade to c. 1300 and the west tower to the 15th century. In 1796, the east end of the chancel was altered and its roof re-covered.

By the mid-19th century, the church was found to be in poor structural condition, particularly as one of its side walls was "considerably out of the perpendicular", and the roof's timbers were in a state of decay. The decision was made to demolish and rebuild most of the church, with the exception of the tower. It was also decided to enlarge the church with the addition of a south aisle as congregation numbers had exceeded the church's capacity.

The rebuilding and extension plans were drawn up by the architect Benjamin Ferrey, with seated capacity increased from 140 to 331. Owing to the parish's small size and limited wealth, an appeal was launched to raise the necessary funds for the work. By mid-February 1845, over £450 had been raised by donations, including a grant of £120 from the Salisbury Diocesan Church Building Association.

Tenders were sought for the works by 26 April 1845 and the contract was subsequently given to Messrs Cornick and Sons of Bridport, whose tender was "considerably lower" than the others. During the work, which was carried out in 1845–46, services were temporarily held in the parish's schoolroom.

Today, the church continues to serve the parish of Osmington with Poxwell. It forms part of the Ridgeway circuit, a group of seven churches within the region of Weymouth.

== Architecture ==
St Osmund's is built of local stone, with slate roofs and window dressings in Ham Hill stone. It is made up of the nave, north and south aisles, chancel, west tower and south porch. The north aisle was rebuilt during the 1845–46 work; new windows were added but old stonework was used for the walls. The new south aisle was designed to match the north aisle. The two-stage embattled tower is surmounted by a turret and has a clock on its east side. It has three storeys internally and contains four bells: one inscribed 'Angelus Gabriel' and dating to the late 14th century, one inscribed 'Ave Maria' and dating to the 15th century, and two by John Wallis, dated 1593.

Internal fittings include a restored font which has been dated to c. 1200. The stone pulpit was erected in memory of the district's HM Inspector of Schools, Rev. W. F. Tregarthen, in 1884, and the brass lectern was added at the same time in memory of the vicar Rev. Sir James Erasmus Philipps. The rood screen dates to 1897.

The lychgate at the entrance of the churchyard dates to 1895. It was erected in the memory of the vicar Rev. J. T. Vaudrey and was dedicated by the Archdeacon of Dorset, Rev. Francis Sowter, on 13 November 1895. The churchyard contains two Grade II listed features: the table tomb of Robert Godsall, dated 1678, and an unidentified headstone from the 18th century.
