= Wraxall, Dorset =

Civil parish in Dorset, England

Coordinates: 50.8056°N 2.6059°W

Wraxall
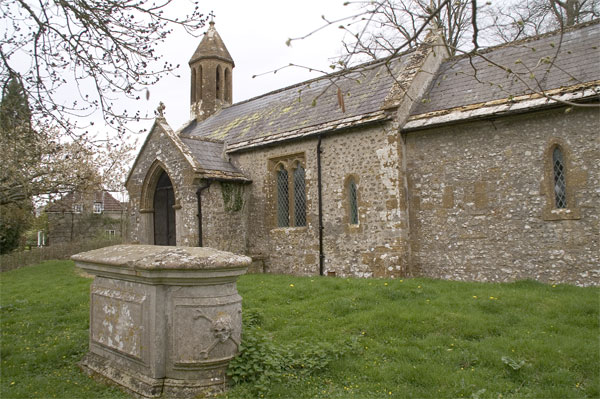
- Church of St Mary, Lower Wraxall

- Location within Dorset
- Population: 40
- OS grid reference: ST572012
- Unitary authority: Dorset
- Ceremonial county: Dorset
- Region: South West
- Country: England
- Sovereign state: United Kingdom
- Post town: Dorchester
- Postcode district: DT2
- Police: Dorset
- Fire: Dorset and Wiltshire
- Ambulance: South Western
- UK Parliament: West Dorset

Wraxall is a civil parish in the English county of Dorset, consisting of the two hamlets Higher Wraxall and Lower Wraxall. It is situated in a valley in the chalk hills of the Dorset Downs, about 11 miles (18 km) north-west of the county town Dorchester. Dorset County Council's 2013 mid-year estimate of the parish population is 40.

The origin of the name Wraxall, shared with several other villages in Somerset, Wiltshire and Dorset, is thought to be "a nook of land frequented by buzzards".

St Mary's Church is the most noticeable building in the parish.
