= Stratton, Dorset =

Village and civil parish in Dorset, England

Coordinates: 50.7427°N 2.4955°W

Stratton
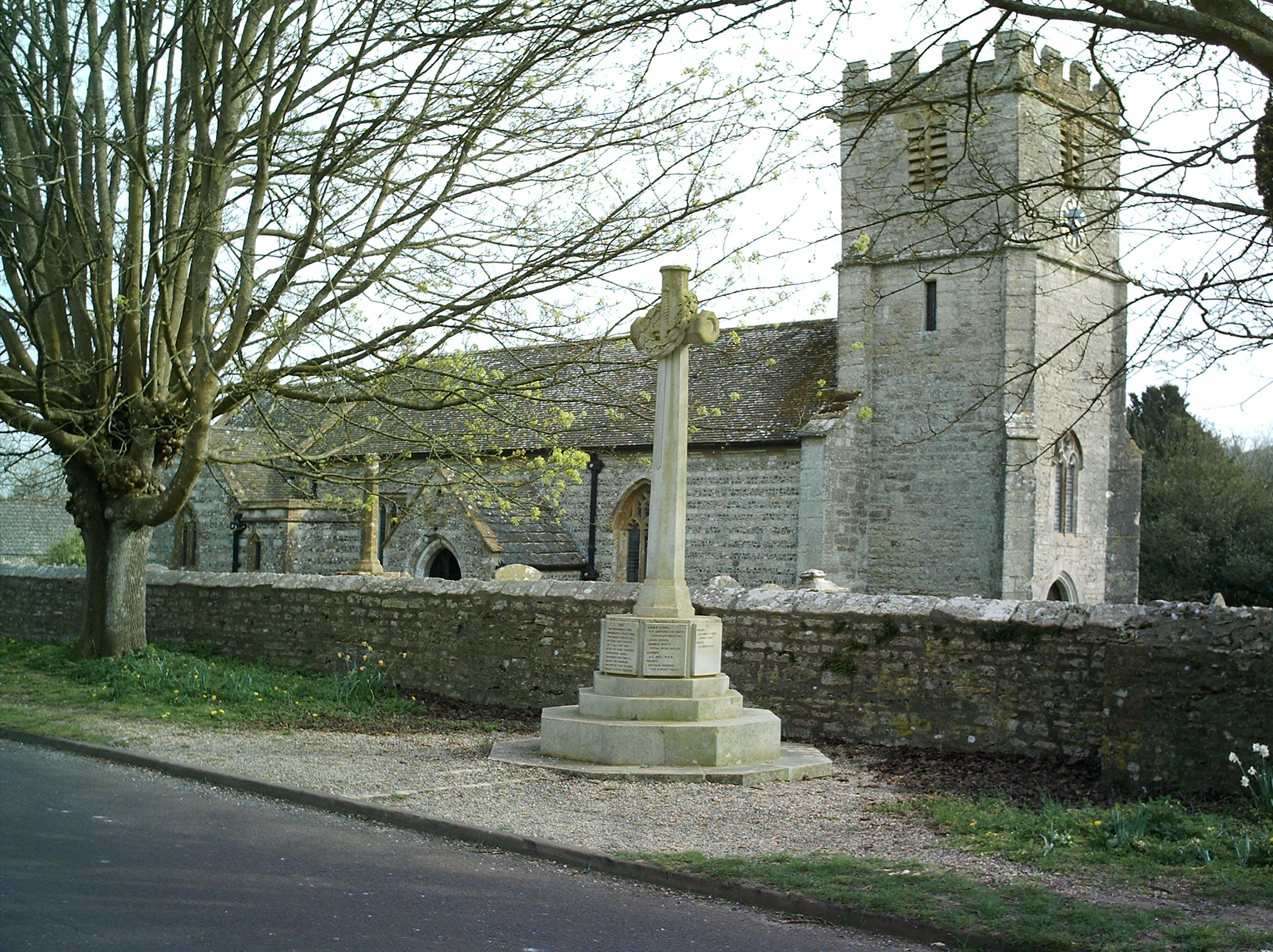
- War memorial & St. Mary's parish church

- Location within Dorset
- Population: 592
- OS grid reference: SY651938
- Civil parish: Stratton
- Unitary authority: Dorset
- Ceremonial county: Dorset
- Region: South West
- Country: England
- Sovereign state: United Kingdom
- Post town: Dorchester
- Postcode district: DT2
- Dialling code: 01305
- Police: Dorset
- Fire: Dorset and Wiltshire
- Ambulance: South Western
- UK Parliament: West Dorset
- Website: Stratton Dorset

Stratton is a village and civil parish in Dorset, England, situated in the Frome valley about 3 miles (4.8 km) north-west of Dorchester. The parish includes the hamlets of Grimstone, Ash Hill and Wrackleford which, like the village, lie on or near the A37 trunk road. Ash Hill is a small estate east of the village near the railway. Wrackleford is a group of houses further east and centred about Wrackleford House and including Higher Wrackleford and Lower Wrackleford. In addition there are a number of isolated farms and houses including a few in an area called Langford near the Sydling Water in the north-west part of the parish.

The name Stratton means 'Farm on the Street'. The Street referred to the Roman road from Durnovaria (Dorchester) to Lindinis (Ilchester) which passes through the village.

The parish has an area of about 1,710 acres (690 ha). Most of this is agricultural land lying north of the village where the land rises from about 250 feet (76 m) to about 620 feet (190 m). Stratton parish is bounded by the parishes of Bradford Peverell, Frampton, Sydling St. Nicholas, Godmanstone and Charminster. In the 2011 census the parish had a population of 592.

== History ==
=== Early monuments ===
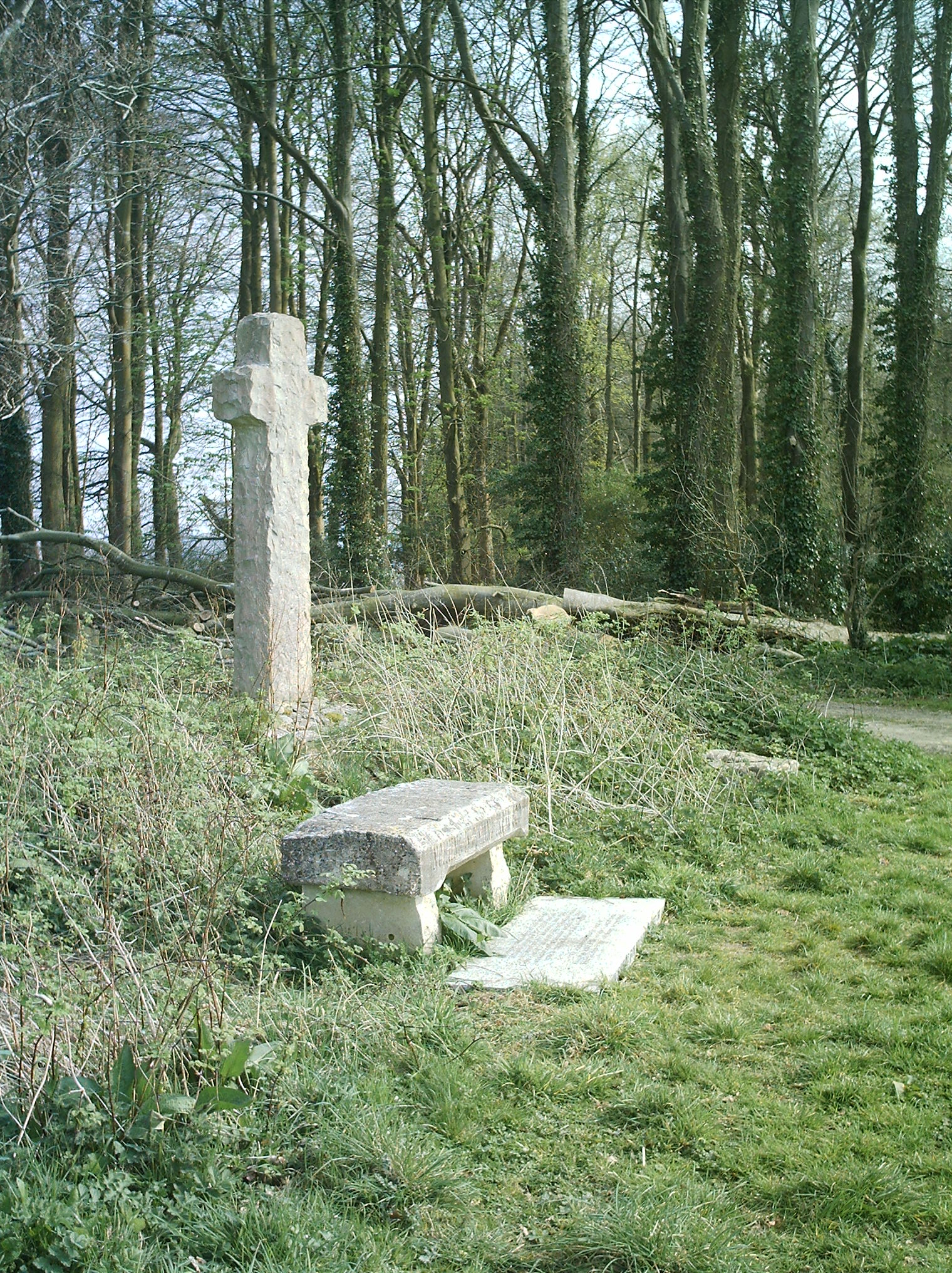
Jackman's Cross

The principal monument in the parish is the Celtic settlement on Grimstone Down. This consists of traces of Celtic fields covering more than.100 acres (40 ha) near the centre of this area, between the field-banks, several hollowed tracks converge on a series of smaller enclosures which indicate the position of the main settlement.

As well as the Celtic settlement there is a number of Bronze Age barrow.

Near here is the base of a mediaeval cross called Jackman's Cross. A new stone cross and bench nearby were erected to mark the Millennium.

=== Roads ===
The village lies on or near the Roman road linking Durnovaria (Dorchester) with Lindinis (Ilchester). This road passed through Bradford Peverell and crossed the River Frome and its flood plain, passed the current village and then followed a line approximately along the track to Grimstone Dairy, then near Grimstone Viaduct and then along the line of the A37 towards Yeovil on the section known as Long Ash Lane.

By mediaeval times it seems that although the same line was used for the main road west of the village, to the east an alternative route was used. This followed the current line of the A37 to Wrackleford, then through Charminster, up East Hill and then into Dorchester through Burton.

A turnpike trust, the Maiden Newton Trust, was established by the Somerset and Dorset Roads Act 1778 (18 Geo. 3. c. 95), and included the main road through the parish. It seems that originally the same line was used for this turnpike. A route from Frampton to the main road near Winterbourne Steepleton was included in this trust but did not pass through the Stratton parish, being on a more direct route near Muckleford. A continuing act, the Roads from Barwick, Maiden Newton, Broadwindsor, Beaminster and Frampton Act 1798 (38 Geo. 3. c. xxii) was passed for this trust. This 1798 act changed part of the line of the main road and part of the route from Frampton to the main road at Winterbourne Steepleton to what are now the existing roads. The part of the future A37 between Stratton village and Grimstone kept to a more level route south of the previous route and linked up to a new road near Muckleford on the route towards Winterbourne Steepleton at a point called Brewers Ash. The toll house at this corner still exists. The original route from Muckleford directly to Frampton fell into disuse. There had been a toll gate in Grimstone before this date but this must have been at a different location.

Although not in Stratton parish, it may be noted that it was not until the third continuing act of Parliament, the Maiden Newton Roads Act 1840 (3 & 4 Vict. c. lxv), that the new road between Wrackleford and Dorchester was authorized. This left the previous route just west of Charminster and crossed the meadows to join the previous road at the Bottom of the Grove in Dorchester, the now familiar road into Dorchester.

The last major change to the route of the main road within the parish was the Stratton bypass. This was built in 1967 between the village and the railway line and necessitated the demolition of the village school which stood at the west end of the village near the railway line.

=== The railway ===
The Castle Cary-Weymouth Heart of Wessex Line passes through the parish. This was originally part of the Wiltshire, Somerset and Weymouth Railway which opened on 20 January 1857 and later became part of the Great Western Railway.

The broad gauge Wiltshire, Somerset and Weymouth Railway was incorporated in 1845. However, in 1848 work on the line stopped completely. In 1850 the Great Western Railway assumed responsibility for the line but it was not until 1857 that the line opened. The line was converted to standard gauge in 1874, a change that took just five days.

The first reference to the railway in the parish registers is on 29 August 1847 when two children were baptised whose fathers were recorded as "Miner on the Wilts & Somerset Railroad". The parish registers also record the burials of two men connected with the railway who died before its opening. On 6 November 1854 Alfred Needs was buried. He was 16 years old and was "killed by a truck on the rail road". On 25 January 1855 George Moss, aged 46, "Railway Labourer", was buried.

Grimstone and Frampton railway station is in the hamlet of Grimstone at the western edge of the parish and was part of the original railway. Bradford Peverell & Stratton Halt was opened in 1933. British Railways closed both stations in 1966.

=== Church and chapel ===
The Church of England parish church of Saint Mary has walls of local rubble stone with dressings of the same material. The roofs are tiled, lead and stone slates. The West Tower is 14th or 15th century and has a ring of five bells. The tower has a 16th-century five-sided enclosed oak staircase. It is supported by a moulded post and is believed to be of unique design. The nave has a number of 15th-century windows with traces of mediaeval glass. The remainder of the church was largely rebuilt in 1891. For a long period up to the rebuilding the church had no chancel, the chancel arch having been bricked up. In 1891 a new chancel and chancel arch were built, and the original chancel arch was incorporated into the west wall of the new chancel. The church bells have recently been renovated.

The parish registers date from Christmas Day 1561, the first entry recording the burial of a John Lymington on that day. St Mary's parish is part of the United Benefice of "Charminster, Stinsford, and the Chalk Stream Villages" cscsvbenefice.org.

The Friends of St Mary's Church is a voluntary body that holds regular fundraising events to help defray the costs of maintaining the fabric of the church and churchyard.

A Methodist chapel was built in the village in 1912 and closed in 1971. It was sold in 1975 and is now a private home.

=== War memorial ===
The village war memorial is just outside the churchyard. It records the names of ten men who died in the Great War and three who died in The Second World War. It was dedicated on 30 November 1919.

The four officers mentioned on the Great War section are Alexander, Percy and Charles Pope, sons of Alfred and Elizabeth Mary Pope of Wrackleford and Alan Haig-Brown who was their brother-in-law, having married Violet Mary Pope, a daughter of Alfred and Elizabeth Mary. A plaque in the church gives more details of these four men.

Lists of men of the parish who served in the Great War and The Second World War are in the church.

== Governance ==
Stratton has its own Parish Council, and is in the Three Valleys ward of Dorset County Council. In the 2011 census the population of the Frome Valley ward was 2,210. This ward is one of 32 that comprise the West Dorset parliamentary constituency, which is currently represented in the UK national parliament by the Conservative Oliver Letwin.

== Geography ==
=== Railway ===
The railway enters the parish from the north-west soon after leaving the Frampton Tunnel. It then passes over Grimstone Viaduct, under which passes Sydling Water and the road from Sydling St. Nicholas. It then passes Grimstone and Frampton railway station before entering a cutting, then passes north of Stratton village, past Bradford Peverell & Stratton Halt, over the A37 and then over the River Frome as it leaves the parish towards Dorchester. Three footpaths near the village cross the railway line.

=== Rivers ===
The southern boundary of the parish between it and Bradford Peverell is generally marked by the River Frome. An area mainly north of the river is a flood plain and at the northern edge of this and close to the village is a winterbourne called the Wrackle which aids the flow of the main river. One well used footpath crosses the flood plain between the village and Bradford Peverell while another less well used one crosses between Grimstone and Muckleford.

The western boundary of the parish between it and Frampton is generally marked by Sydling Water.

== Demography ==
The table below shows the recorded population of the parish since the first UK census of 1801.

In 1989 a local landowner sold some land to developers. The major residential development on this land accounts for most of the increase in population between the 1991 and 2011 censuses.

The 2013 figure is the most recent parish population estimate, provided by Dorset County Council.

Historic Parish Population Figures
Year	1801	1811	1821	1831	1841	1851	1861	1871	1881	1891	1901
Population	233	253	262	310	331	394	351	341	299	329	311
Year	1911	1921	1931	1951	1961	1971	1981	1991	2001	2011	(2013)
Population	304	314	291	264	273	228	297	318	435	592	(610)

== Amenities ==
The village has a public house, The Saxon Arms, a new Village Hall, a village green with a play area and a sports field.

== Notable residents ==
The footballer Trevor Senior was born in the parish in 1961.
