= Geography of Dorset =

Dorset shown within England

Dorset is a county located in the middle of the south coast of England. It lies between the latitudes 50.512°N and 51.081°N and the longitudes 1.682°W and 2.958°W, and occupies an area of 2,653 km^{2} (1,024 sq mi). It spans 90 kilometres (56 mi) from east to west and 63 kilometres (39 mi) from north to south.

The geology of Dorset is varied; most of the different rocks found in the wider south-east of England outcrop within its boundaries. The oldest rocks (formed in the Early Jurassic epoch) are found in the west of the county; a general progression eastwards reveals younger strata formed in the Middle and Late Jurassic epochs, and the Cretaceous and Paleogene periods. Many of the sea-cliffs in the county, particularly around the town of Lyme Regis, are very rich in exposed fossils.

Dorset's terrain is lowland in nature, albeit hilly in many parts. The highest point in the county is Lewesdon Hill, 279m above sea-level. The landscape of much of the county comprises hills formed by strata of the Chalk Group; these hills include the Dorset Downs (sometimes called the North Dorset Downs), parts of the South Dorset Downs, and the Purbeck Hills. To the north of the Dorset Downs is the Blackmore Vale, a relatively low-lying area of clays and limestones of Jurassic age. The south-east of the county forms part of the Hampshire Basin, an asymmetric syncline covered in sands and gravels of Paleogene age.

The main rivers in the county are the Stour, Frome and Piddle. The Stour is the county's largest river, although its source is in the neighbouring county of Wiltshire. The Frome and Piddle both lie wholly within the county.

The whole of Dorset's coastline is designated part of the Jurassic Coast World Heritage Site, and contains examples of many different coastal landforms, reflecting the variety of the underlying geology. At 191m Golden Cap is the highest cliff on the south coast of England.

The natural resources of Dorset again reflect its particular geology. Western Europe's largest onshore oilfield lies under the south-east of the county. Portland stone and Purbeck limestone have both been quarried for centuries to provide construction material for buildings around the world. Purbeck ball clay is quarried for use in the production of fine pottery.

The predominant land use in Dorset is agriculture. On the chalk hills this is largely arable, whereas in the valleys and vales it is more mixed with pasture. The sand and gravel soils between the towns of Dorchester and Poole were historically covered in heathland, although much of this is now afforested. 53% of the county is designated as being an Area of Outstanding Natural Beauty, and there are 139 Sites Of Special Scientific Interest, covering an area of 199.45 square kilometres (77.01 sq mi).

Dorset is a largely rural county; the county's largest and only major urban area is the South East Dorset conurbation, based on the towns of Poole, Bournemouth and Christchurch, with a combined population of around 400,000. The population of the county overall is 714,900. The conurbation has a green belt surrounding it to prevent urban sprawl and afford other protections to the wider area.

Map of the Ceremonial County of Dorset

== Area ==
Dorset's unitary authorities: 1 Dorset UA 2 Bournemouth, Christchurch and Poole

Dorset is a county in the middle of the south coast of England. It lies between the latitudes 50.512°N and 51.081°N and the longitudes 1.682°W and 2.958°W, and occupies an area of 2,653 km^{2} (1,024 sq mi). It spans 90 kilometres (56 mi) from east to west and 63 kilometres (39 mi) from north to south.

For local government purposes, Dorset is divided into two unitary authorities. Bournemouth, Christchurch and Poole (BCP), in the south-east of the county, takes in most of the South East Dorset conurbation, while the remainder of the county is administered by the Dorset unitary authority. Until local government reforms in 2019, most of the county was served by the Dorset County Council (divided into six non-metropolitan districts), while Poole and Bournemouth were unitary authorities.

== Geology ==
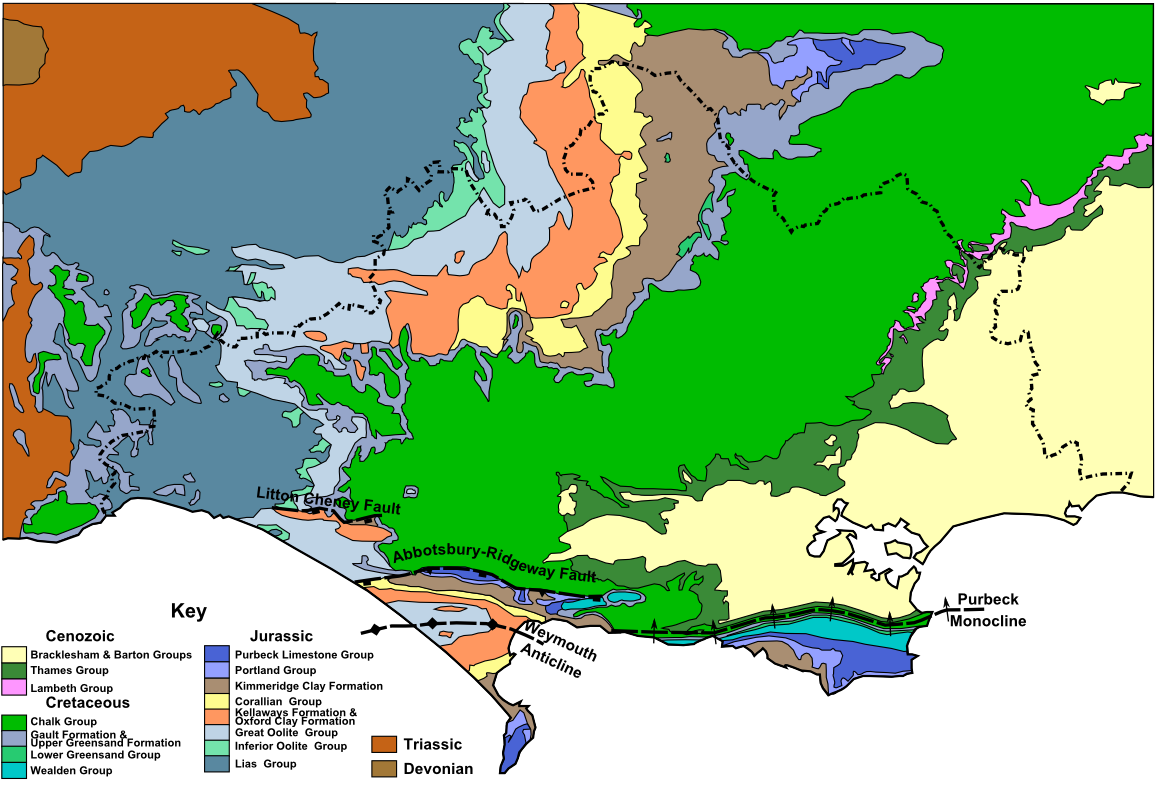
Geological map of Dorset

The geology of Dorset is varied; most of the different rocks found in the wider south-east of England outcrop within its boundaries. The geological structure of the county is easily visible in places, making Dorset a suitable place for geological study. The rocks outcropping in Dorset are all of sedimentary origin, and were formed in the Jurassic, Cretaceous and Paleogene periods of geological history. The oldest rocks are found in the west and north of the county, the youngest in the east. The south-east of the county occupies the western end of the Hampshire Basin, an asymmetric syncline which underlies a large part of central southern England.

== Hills and vales ==
=== Dorset Downs ===
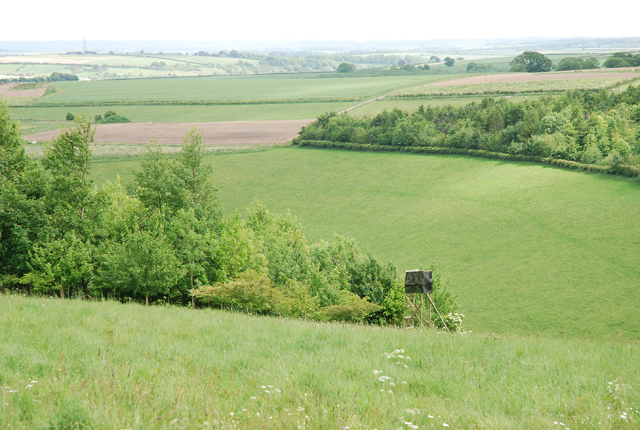
Typical landscape of the Dorset Downs

The Dorset Downs are chalk hills formed by strata of the Chalk Group, a geological unit which also covers much of southern and eastern England. The chalk which comprises the downs was formed in the Cretaceous period, when the area now known as Dorset was below sea-level. The Dorset Downs are the largest outcrop of the chalk within Dorset, and occupy much of the central part of the county. They stretch northeastwards from Eggardon Hill and Beaminster Down in the west of the county, to Bell Hill and Shillingstone Hill overlooking the River Stour near Blandford Forum. The chalk hills continue on the other side of the Stour Valley as Cranborne Chase. The Downs are part of the northern rim of the Hampshire Basin, which dips gently to the southeast from the steep north-facing scarp slope. The dip slope of the chalk is incised by seasonal streams or winterbornes, which have formed several roughly parallel valleys aligned north to south.

=== Blackmore Vale ===
The Blackmore Vale is a broad vale of relatively low-lying land in the north of the county. Its boundary is indistinct, but roughly conforms to that part of the catchment area of the River Stour that lies north of the Dorset Downs and west of Cranborne Chase. It partly lies within south Somerset. The underlying rock strata are mostly of Jurassic age, comprising broad bands of clay (Oxford Clay and Kimmeridge Clay) separated by narrower bands of limestone (Corallian limestone and Cornbrash), with a narrow outcrop of Early Cretaceous Greensand and Gault clay close to the chalk hills. The alternating bands of clay and limestone result in the floor of the vale being gently undulating rather than flat.

=== Marshwood Vale ===
The Marshwood Vale is a bowl-shaped valley in the extreme west of the county. Its floor is composed of Lower Lias clay which produces wet ground most suitable for pasture. It is drained by the River Char, which flows southwest to the coast at Charmouth. It is surrounded by hills, including the two highest points in the county, Lewesdon Hill (279 metres) and Pilsdon Pen (277 metres).

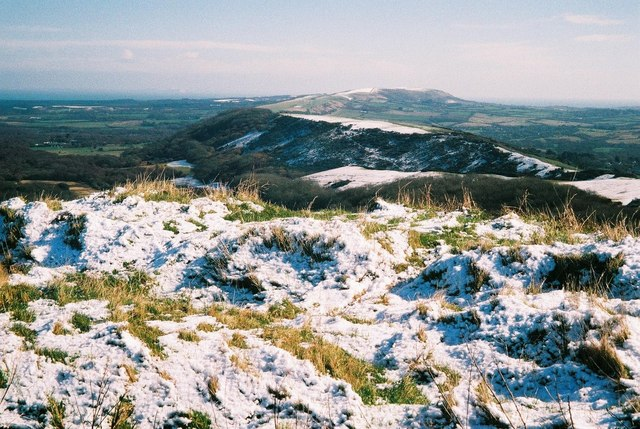
Ridge-top view looking east along the Purbeck Hills

=== Purbeck Hills ===
The Purbeck Hills are a line of chalk hills running roughly east to west along the centre of the peninsula known as the Isle of Purbeck. They are formed of chalk of the same Chalk Group as the Dorset Downs to the north; beyond the Purbeck Hills the visible chalk extends westwards into the South Dorset Downs, which join the northern downs west of Dorchester. The Purbeck Hills are a monocline, a step-like geological fold dating from about 30 million years ago, resulting from the same collision of tectonic plates which built the Alps. Gaps in the ridge at Corfe Castle and Arish Mell are due to faults causing weakening of the chalk.

=== Cranborne Chase ===
Cranborne Chase is composed of a continuation of the same chalk strata which form the Dorset Downs to the south-west; it is divided from the Downs by the valley of the River Stour, which cuts through the chalk at Blandford Forum. Cranborne Chase lies partly within the neighbouring county of Wiltshire. It is a sparsely populated area that is well-wooded in parts. The name 'chase' comes from its previous use as a hunting area.

== Rivers and lakes ==
=== River Stour ===
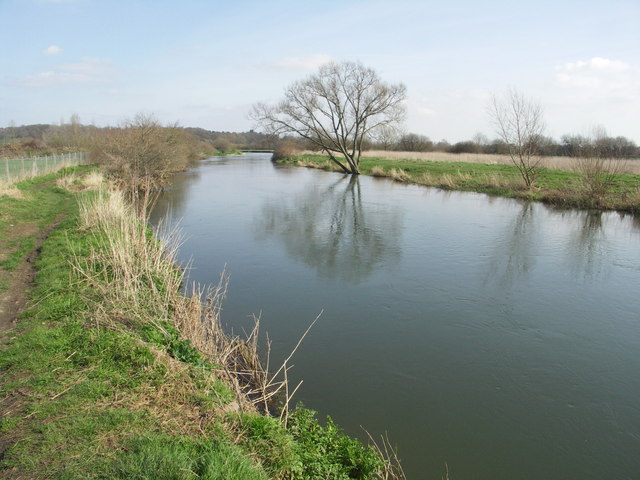
River Stour at Longham, north of Bournemouth

At 60 miles in length, the River Stour is Dorset's longest river, although its source is just outside the county boundary at Stourhead in Wiltshire to the north. It enters Dorset near the village of Bourton, then flows generally southwards through the Blackmore Vale via the towns of Gillingham and Sturminster Newton. Virtually the whole of the Blackmore Vale is within the Stour's catchment area. It leaves the Blackmore Vale in a deep valley which it has cut through the chalk hills; it hence forms the divide between the Dorset Downs to the southwest and Cranborne Chase to the northeast. It is the only one of Dorset's rivers to pass through the chalk in this way. It then flows generally southeastwards through Blandford Forum and around the northern suburbs of Bournemouth, to enter the English Channel through Christchurch Harbour. It is tidal for about the last 3 miles. The main tributaries of the Stour are the River Cale and River Lydden in the Blackmore Vale, and the Moors River and River Allen which join the Stour in its lower reaches after it has passed through the chalk.

=== River Frome ===
At 30 miles in length, the River Frome is only half the length of the Stour, however unlike the Stour, the Frome lies wholly within the county boundary, rising in the village of Evershot on the Dorset Downs, and entering the English Channel through Poole Harbour. Its catchment area is 181 square miles, or one sixth of the county. It also differs from the Stour in that in its upper reaches it is a chalk stream, and even when it leaves the chalk and flows over acid sands and gravels east of Dorchester, its load of sediment from the chalk is sufficient to counteract the acidity and create fertile pasture and watermeadows. The main tributaries of the Frome are the River Hooke and River Cerne.

=== River Piddle (River Trent) ===
The River Piddle (alternative name: River Trent) follows a similar and almost parallel course to the Frome, rising a few miles to the east on the chalk downs near the village of Alton Pancras, then flowing roughly southeastwards through chalk and over sands and gravels to reach the English Channel through Poole Harbour. Along its course it gives its name to several villages, each bearing the prefix 'Piddle' or 'Puddle'. The Piddle is the only river in Dorset to have an alternative name.

=== Other rivers ===
There are several smaller rivers and streams in Dorset which do not form part of the catchments of either the Stour, Frome or Piddle. Many of these drain short tracts of land between coastal hills and the English Channel. In the extreme west, the River Char drains the Marshwood Vale and enters the Channel at Charmouth. The River Brit rises north of Beaminster, flows south through Bridport and enters the Channel at West Bay. Near the village of Burton Bradstock, about 1 mile east of the mouth of the Brit, is the terminus of the small River Bride; this rises at Bridehead in the hills between Dorchester and Bridport, and flows westwards for about seven miles "before sinking into the shingle" of Chesil Beach. Further east along the coast is the River Wey, which flows into Radipole Lake in Weymouth, and enters the Channel through Weymouth Harbour.

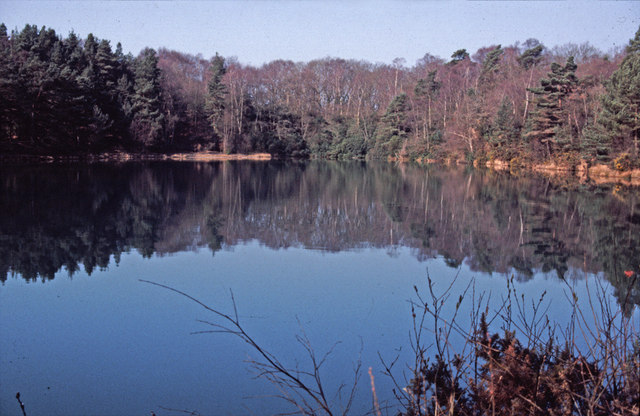
The Blue Pool near Furzebrook

=== Lakes ===
Dorset has no large freshwater lakes, and the more notable freshwater lakes in the county frequently exist as a result of human activity rather than being naturally occurring. Some large country estates, for example Sherborne Castle and Crichel House, have lakes as part of the landscaping of their grounds. The ball clay workings on the Isle of Purbeck have left behind a legacy of numerous small lakes, the most notable of which is the Blue Pool.

=== Brackish lagoons ===
Dorset has several brackish bodies of water, including The Fleet, Radipole Lake and Lodmoor.

== Coastline ==
Excluding the shoreline of Poole Harbour, the Dorset coastline is 142 kilometres (88 mi) long and faces the English Channel. It stretches from Lyme Regis in the west to Highcliffe in the east. The main settlements on the coastline are, from west to east, Lyme Regis, Weymouth, Swanage, Poole, Bournemouth and Christchurch, although the majority of the coastline is not covered by urban development. The Dorset coastline contains a great variety of coastal landforms, including cliffs, bays, headlands, a large natural harbour and a barrier beach.

=== Jurassic Coast ===
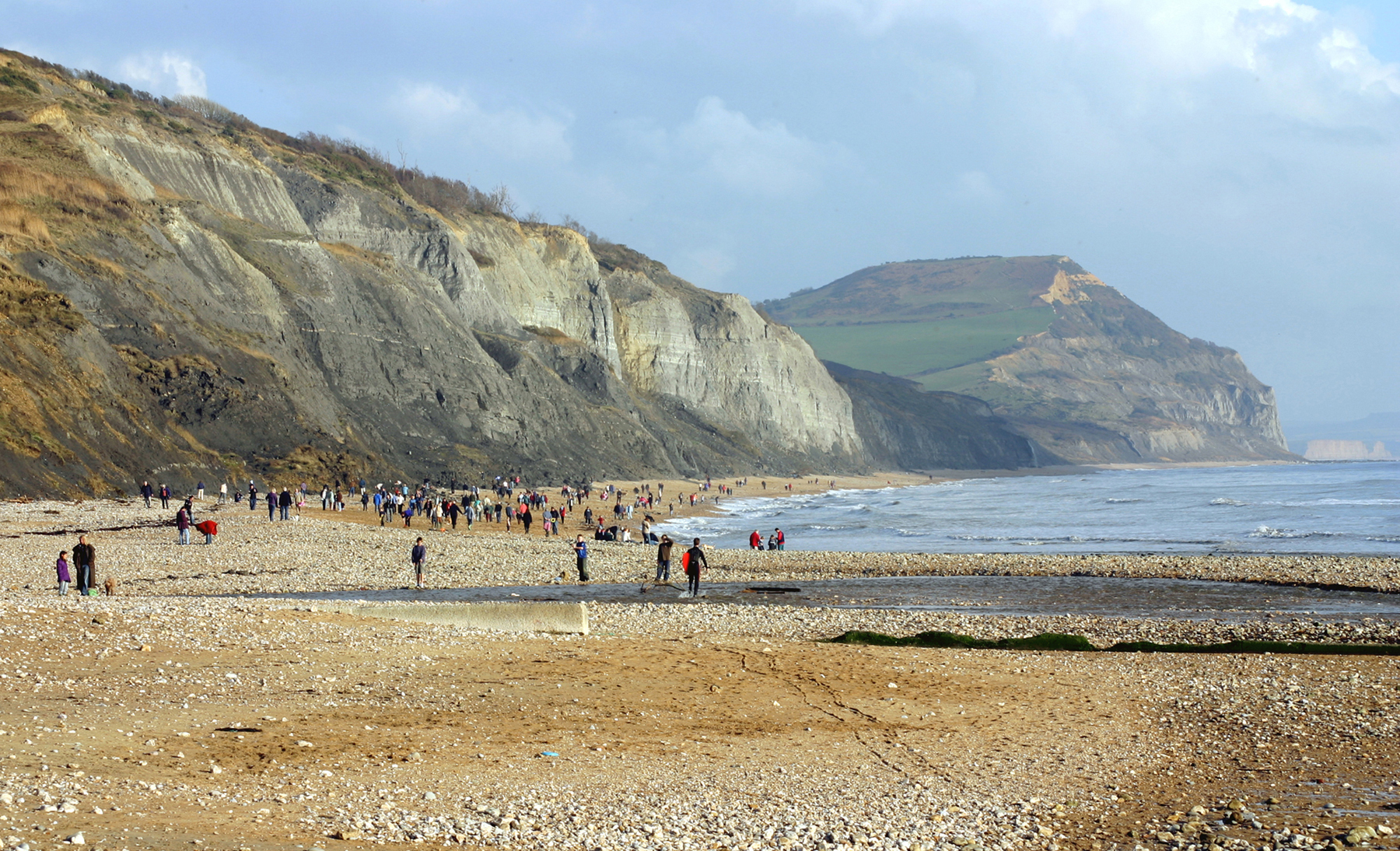
Golden Cap on Dorset's Jurassic Coast

Almost the entire length of the Dorset coast forms the major part of the Jurassic Coast World Heritage Site, designated in 2001. This coast is notable for the variety in its geological structure and resultant landforms, and for the abundance of fossils found within its cliffs. The rocks of the Jurassic Coast in Dorset range in age from the Early Jurassic in the west to the Cretaceous in the east. Within the length of Dorset's coast can be found examples of a nearly circular cove (Lulworth Cove), a very clearly exposed and accessible geological fold (Stair Hole), a natural sea arch (Durdle Door), sea stacks (Old Harry Rocks), an active landslip (Black Ven), and numerous and often quite spectacular cliffs, including the highest cliff on England's south coast, Golden Cap.

=== Isle of Portland ===
The Isle of Portland is a tied island lying in the English Channel less than 8 kilometres (5.0 mi) south from Weymouth, at roughly the midpoint along the Dorset coastline. It measures approximately 4 miles in length and 1.5 miles in width at its widest point. It is connected to the mainland only by the narrow strip of shingle which forms Chesil Beach. It is composed entirely from Portland limestone rock, which has been extensively quarried for centuries for use as a building stone. The main settlement on the peninsula is Fortuneswell. Between Fortuneswell and Weymouth is Portland Harbour, one of the largest man-made harbours in the world.

=== Isle of Purbeck ===
The Isle of Purbeck is a broad peninsula in the south-east of the county, bounded by the English Channel to the south and east, and by Poole Harbour to the north. The chalk ridge of the Purbeck Hills traverses the middle of the peninsula from west to east. To the north of the ridge are several areas of heathland, which in many places have been excavated for Purbeck Ball Clay. The Purbeck coast is varied and contains sandy bays, headlands of chalk and limestone, and also shales and the small onshore oil well at Kimmeridge. The main settlement on Purbeck is the coastal resort town of Swanage.

=== Poole Harbour ===
Poole Harbour is a large but shallow natural harbour in the south-east of the county, to the north of the Isle of Purbeck and to the west of the South East Dorset conurbation. It is one of the world's larger natural harbours, covering 14 square miles. It was formed about 6,000 years ago after the last Ice Age, as a rising sea-level flooded the valleys of the rivers Frome and Piddle, which now flow into the harbour from the west. The harbour's entrance, on its eastern side between the Sandbanks peninsula and South Haven Point, is narrow, less than 0.25 miles across. Its shoreline is irregular and heavily indented with numerous small inlets and channels, between which many small peninsulas extend out into the body of the harbour. The harbour also houses several small islands, the largest of which is Brownsea Island.

=== Chesil Beach ===
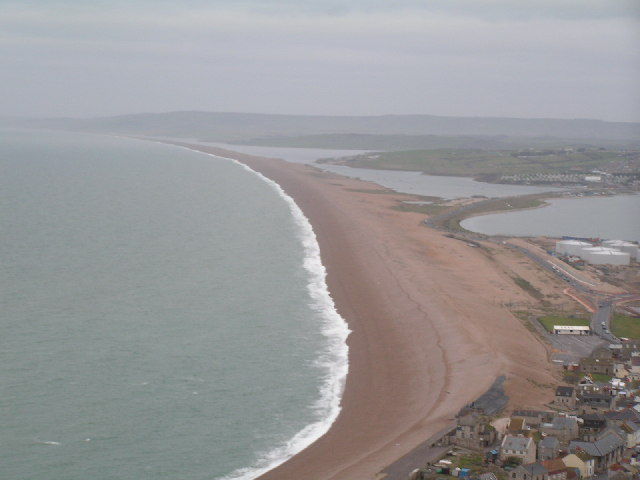
Chesil Beach from the Isle of Portland

Chesil Beach is a barrier beach on the southwest coast of the county. It is 29 kilometres (18 mi) long and stretches between West Bay and the Isle of Portland, although the name Chesil Beach is often only applied to the stretch south-east of Abbotsbury, where it is separated from the land behind it by the large body of brackish water called The Fleet. Chesil Beach is composed of shingle and pebbles which are graded in size from the smallest particles in the west to the largest in the east.

== Environmental protections ==
=== National Landscapes ===
There are two National Landscape areas (formerly known as, and still legally designated as Area of Outstanding Natural Beauty) in Dorset:

- All of the Dorset National Landscape
- Part of Cranborne Chase and West Wiltshire Downs National Landscape

=== Green belt ===
Dorset's only green belt is in the south of the county, surrounding the South East Dorset Conurbation, along with other nearby communities, affording a protection between the urban area and Cranborne Chase. It was first drawn up in the 1950s.

== Natural resources ==
=== Oil ===
Dorset possesses 3 onshore oil fields in the southeast of the county, at Wareham, Kimmeridge and Wytch Farm. Wytch Farm lies between the Purbeck Hills and Poole Harbour; the Purbeck Monocline defines the field's southern limit. Wytch Farm has been producing oil since 1979. A few miles to the southwest at Kimmeridge, a nodding donkey has been pumping up oil from beneath the shale cliffs there since the late 1950s, although yields are declining.

=== Portland stone ===
The Isle of Portland has been extensively quarried for Portland stone for centuries. Portland stone is an oolitic limestone that is greatly valued as a building stone because it has an attractive appearance, is easy to work, and resists weathering. It has long been used in the construction of important buildings both in the UK and around the world.

=== Purbeck limestone ===
Purbeck limestone is a building stone which is quarried on a small scale in the Isle of Purbeck. Purbeck marble, a particular type of Purbeck limestone, used to be quarried there but is now only occasionally extracted in small amounts for particular renovation projects.

=== Purbeck ball clay ===
Purbeck ball clay is composed of kaolinite, mica and quartz. It is of sedimentary origin, having been formed during the Eocene epoch in the particular depositional environment of the then subtropical Wareham Basin. It is thus found today on the northern half of the Isle of Purbeck, to the north of the Purbeck Hills, and is used in the production of fine pottery. It has been quarried on a large scale since the middle of the 18th century; Dorset's first railway was constructed in 1806 in order to transport the excavated material. It is still being excavated today.
