= Grimstone and Frampton railway station =

Disused railway station in Dorset, England

Coordinates: 50.7475°N 2.5106°W

Grimstone and Frampton

General information
- Location: England
- Platforms: 2

Other information
- Status: Disused

History
- Original company: Wiltshire, Somerset & Weymouth Railway
- Pre-grouping: Great Western Railway
- Post-grouping: Great Western Railway

Key dates
- 20 January 1857: Opened as Frampton
- July 1857: Renamed Grimstone
- July 1858: Renamed Grimstone and Frampton
- 11 April 1966: Became unstaffed
- 3 October 1966: Closed
Location

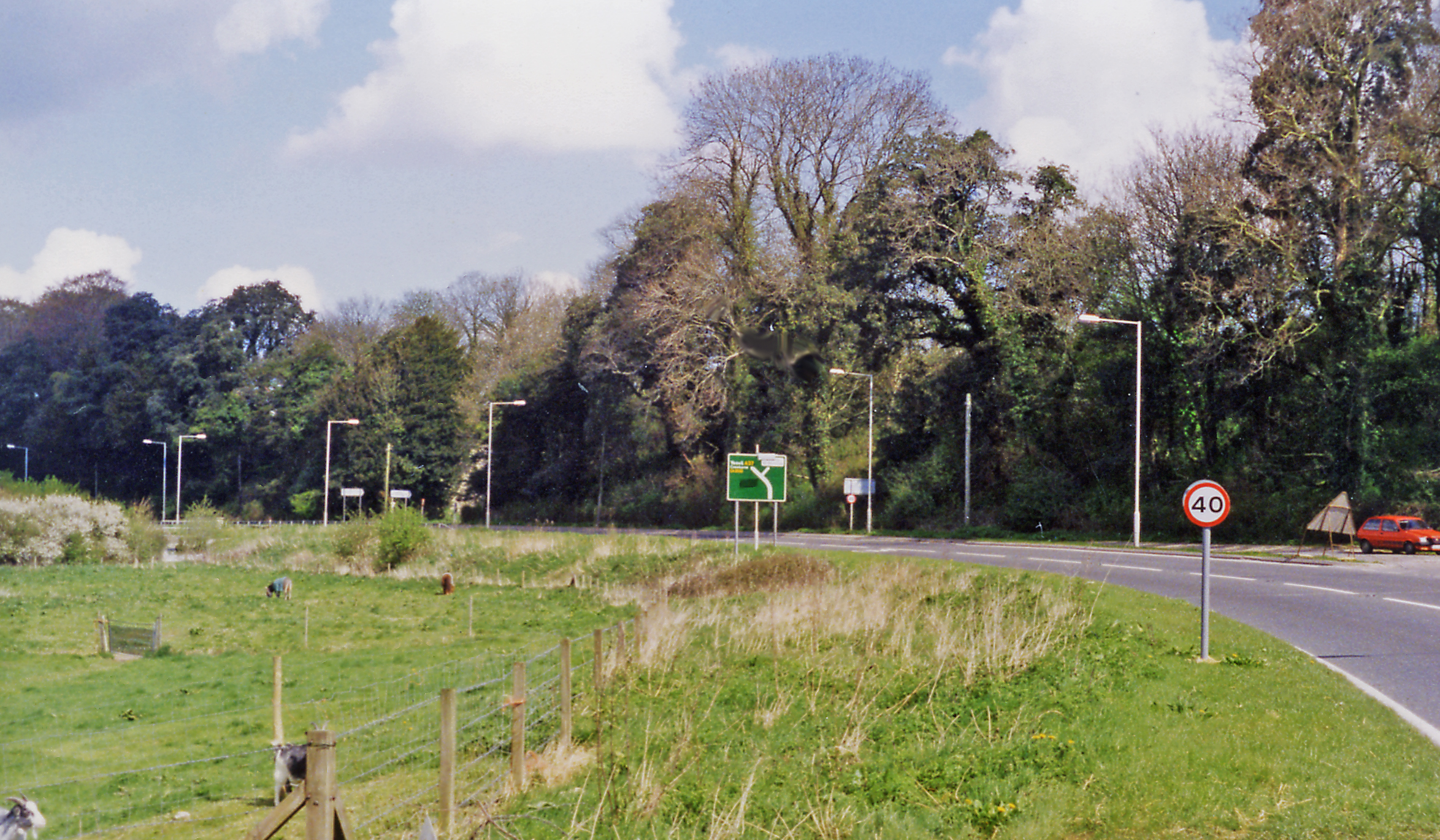
The site of the station in 1995

Grimstone and Frampton railway station was a station on the Wiltshire, Somerset & Weymouth Railway, part of the Great Western Railway between Maiden Newton and Dorchester. It was in the hamlet of Grimstone which was in the parish of Stratton but also relatively close to the parish of Frampton which it was also intended to serve. It was directly south of Grimstone Viaduct.

When the line opened on 20 January 1857 it was called Frampton Station but in July 1857 it changed name to Grimstone Station and in July 1858 it was renamed again to its final name of Grimstone and Frampton Station. The station became unstaffed from 11 April 1966 and closed on 3 October 1966.

Refer to Mike Oakley's booklet for more details.

A fatal accident occurred on Saturday 16 May 1914 when a watercress seller named Carter was killed at the station. If had been customary for him to gather watercress which was grown on the Sydling Water and then return to Dorchester to sell it. He arrived at 4:40 and was apparently to return on the 5:12 train. He left his empty baskets on the down platform and crossed to the up platform via the footbridge. Then as the 4:38 express from Weymouth passed through at 4:57 he walked onto the line and was killed instantly, despite the express sounding warning whistles as it approached the station. An inquest was held on the Monday at which it emerged that he had not gathered any watercress and despite what he had said he had not forwarded any to Dorchester. The jury recorded a verdict that he was accidentally knocked down.

He was always referred to as Carter and no one knew his Christian name. However a postcard was found which had the initial F on it. His age was unknown but estimated to be about 50 and he was thought to have a sister in Ealing. He had lodged at a public house in Dorchester for some years. He was buried at Stratton Church on Tuesday 19 May 1914.

The station master was Thomas Charles Olding, the engine driver was Albert Clifton Webb. The express resumed its journey after an 11-minute delay.

== The site today ==
The station was demolished after closure and the site is now a depot for Minster Fuels.

Preceding station	Historical railways	Following station
Maiden Newton	Great Western Railway; Wilts, Somerset and Weymouth Railway	Bradford Peverell & Stratton Halt; Line Open Station Closed
