= Laurence Warburton Pike =

English merchant and activist (1849–1900)

Laurence Warburton Pike JP
- Pike, c. 1900
- Born: 1849; Wareham, Dorset, Dorset, England
- Died: 30 August 1900 (aged 77); Furzebrook, Dorset, England
- Resting place: St Peter's Churchyard, Church Knowle; 50.63708°N 2.08511°W
- Occupations: Merchant; activist
- Known for: Animal welfare, vegetarianism, and temperance activism
- Spouse: Eleanor Sturdy (m. 1877; died 1900)

Laurence Warburton Pike (Note: His first name is sometimes recorded as Lawrence.) JP (1849 – 30 August 1900) was an English merchant, animal welfare, vegetarianism, and temperance advocate. A justice of the peace and member of the Pike family's clay business at Furzebrook, Dorset, he abandoned hunting and shooting and became involved in animal protection. During the Second Boer War, he campaigned for measures to reduce the suffering of horses and mules used in warfare, writing publicly on their treatment and proposing reforms to military veterinary provision.

== Biography ==
=== Early life and family ===
Pike was born in the second quarter of 1849 in Wareham, Dorset. He married Eleanor Sturdy in Wareham, in 1877.

=== Merchant career ===
Pike received engineering training when young and later entered the clay industry. An obituary in The Animals' Friend described his interest in the geology and landscape of the Isle of Purbeck and his subsequent settlement at Furzebrook, where clay was extracted for the Staffordshire Potteries. In 1895, Kelly's Directory listed Laurence Warburton Pike as a justice of the peace at Furzebrook and Pike Brothers as clay merchants with offices there.

=== Animal advocacy ===
Pike with a squirrel, c. 1897

Pike had formerly been a keen sportsman, but came to regard killing animals for recreation as unjustifiable. According to T. Perkins, the influence of his wife contributed to his decision to abandon hunting and shooting, although doing so meant withdrawing from activities common among his friends and neighbours. At a Band of Mercy meeting organised by his wife, he explained that he had previously felt unable to advocate kindness to animals while participating in blood sports, but could do so after renouncing them.

His interest in observing animals continued after he stopped hunting. Wild squirrels and birds around Furzebrook became accustomed to being fed by the Pikes, and he photographed animals around the estate. Several of his photographs illustrated Eleanor Pike's 1898 article "Adjidaumo—Friend and Squirrel", which opposed the trapping and confinement of squirrels.

Pike was a vegetarian, having abandoned meat because of the killing of animals involved in its production. He was also active in the temperance movement. Perkins described him as favouring practical temperance work while disliking the rhetoric of some advocates of total abstinence.

==== Horses in warfare ====
During the Second Boer War, Pike campaigned over the treatment of horses and mules used by the British military. He wrote letters to The Times and other newspapers about wounded animals and the inadequacy of arrangements for their treatment. A contemporary advertisement in The Standard referred to his contribution "Wounded Horses in War".

Pike argued that animals employed in warfare should not be left to die from wounds, hunger or exhaustion, and advocated additional veterinary provision in military campaigns. His work included correspondence with military authorities and proposals for a system in which veterinary surgeons could accompany forces and relieve animals whose injuries could not be treated. His campaign was later discussed by animal protection campaigners concerned with the absence of protections for wounded military animals.

Pike was acquainted with Thomas Hardy, who shared his concern about the use of animals in warfare. Anna West has described Pike as a fellow member of the Royal Society for the Prevention of Cruelty to Animals who appealed directly to the public through open letters and asked Hardy to speak publicly about the treatment of war horses.

=== Photography ===
Pike was also an amateur photographer. He supplied photographs to The Animals' Friend, including images used to illustrate articles written by his wife, and developed an interest in photographing wild animals. A portrait of him was taken by the clergyman and photographer T. Perkins. Thomas Hardy later possessed a copy of the portrait and offered it to Clement King Shorter for use with an obituary.

=== Death ===
Pike died at Furzebrook on 30 August 1900, aged 50. The Animals' Friend described his death as a loss to the humanitarian movement and published a three-page obituary by T. Perkins. The Sphere also reported his death, referring to his writings on the treatment of horses wounded in battle.

He was buried at the parish church in Church Knowle. The memorial erected by his wife described him as a "good kind true unselfish man" and recorded that he died uttering the words "Blessed are the merciful, for they shall obtain mercy". Eleanor's inscription, added after her death in 1933, states that she shared her husband's love of animals and birds.

== Publications ==
- "The Care of Animals in Warfare". The Humane Review. 1 (1–4): 268–270. 1900.

== See also ==
- Horses in warfare
- Horse welfare reforms
- Vegetarianism in the Victorian era
