= Eleanor Pike =

English activist and writer (1855–1933)

- Pike with a squirrel, c. 1897
- Born: Eleanor Sturdy; 1855; Purfleet, Essex, England
- Died: 15 December 1933 (aged 77); Highcliffe, Dorset, England
- Resting place: St Peter's Churchyard, Church Knowle; 50.63708°N 2.08511°W
- Other name: Mrs. Laurence Pike
- Occupations: Activist; writer
- Known for: Animal welfare and vegetarianism activism
- Spouse: Laurence Warburton Pike (m. 1877; died 1900)

Eleanor Pike (née Sturdy; 1855 – 15 December 1933), who also wrote as Mrs. Laurence Pike, (Note: Sometimes spelled Mrs. Lawrence Pike.) was an English animal welfare and vegetarianism activist, and writer. She was an honorary secretary of the Royal Society for the Protection of Birds in Wareham and a local secretary of the Humanitarian League, and also participated in the Vegetarian Society.

Pike wrote on vegetarianism and the treatment of wild animals for publications including The Vegetarian Messenger and The Animals' Friend. In later life, she lived at Holmhurst in Highcliffe, Dorset, where the grounds of her estate were maintained as a sanctuary for wild animals and hunting and killing were prohibited.

== Biography ==
=== Early and personal life ===
Pike was born Eleanor Sturdy in the second quarter of 1855, in Purfleet, Essex. Her parents were Dan Sturdy, of Trigon, Wareham, Dorset, and Eleanor Sturdy.

In 1877, she married Laurence Warburton Pike (Note: His first name is also recorded as Lawrence.) in Wareham. He was a member of the Pike family of clay merchants at Furzebrook, near Wareham. The couple lived at Furzebrook House from the 1880s. Laurence was a vegetarian and animal welfare campaigner who advocated more humane treatment of horses during the Second Boer War. He died on 30 August 1900. A memorial erected by Eleanor at Church Knowle described him as a "good kind true unselfish man"; her own inscription was later added to the same memorial and records that she "shared her husband's love of animals & birds".

=== Activism ===
Pike was an honorary secretary of the Royal Society for the Protection of Birds for Wareham. She also worked as a local secretary of the Humanitarian League.

In 1896, Pike set out her reasons for vegetarianism in an address entitled "Why Am I a Vegetarian?", read at the Vegetarian Society's May meetings in Southport. She described her motivation as compassion for animals and argued that eating meat was incompatible with her other animal-protection work, which included organising Band of Mercy meetings and campaigning against vivisection and the use of fur and feathers in clothing. She also criticised the treatment of animals during transport and slaughter. Pike further opposed financial support for Christian missionaries in India, Ceylon and Japan who ate meat, arguing that missionaries should not introduce meat-eating among populations in which vegetarianism was already practised.

In an article entitled "Adjidaumo—Friend and Squirrel", written from Dorset in 1897 and published in The Animals' Friend, Pike described the wild squirrels which visited her home and argued against keeping squirrels in captivity. She recounted rescuing squirrels from traps and criticised the use of steel traps, writing that captive squirrels could suffer damaged feet and teeth. She called on the authorities responsible for the New Forest to prohibit the killing of squirrels and disturbance of their nests in protected areas, and appealed to owners of woodland to show mercy towards wild animals. The article was illustrated with photographs taken by her husband.

In 1900, Pike moved to Holmhurst, Highcliffe. The house stood within an estate of about 100 acres (40 ha), surrounded by a high corrugated-iron and barbed-wire fence. Pike rarely received visitors and was described in obituaries as a recluse. Rabbits, squirrels, foxes and badgers were allowed to live undisturbed in the grounds, and Pike fed the animals each morning. She permitted no animals to be killed there, and her servants were not allowed to eat meat.

=== Death and estate ===
Pike died at Holmhurst on 15 December 1933, aged 77. She was buried at St Peter's Churchyard, Church Knowle.

Her estate was valued for probate at £46,192, with net personal property of £38,800. Her will left £10,000, three cottages and their gardens, her motor cars and other property to her servant Thomas Sherratt, provided that he remained in her service at the time of her death. A further £10,000 was left to her niece, Eleanor Christine Wood Homer.

Pike was commemorated on her husband's memorial at Church Knowle.

== See also ==
- History of vegetarianism
- Vegetarianism in the Victorian era
- Vegetarianism in the United Kingdom
- Women and vegetarianism and veganism advocacy
- Women and animal advocacy
