= Up Sydling =

Hamlet in Dorset, England

Coordinates: 50.8111°N 2.5309°W

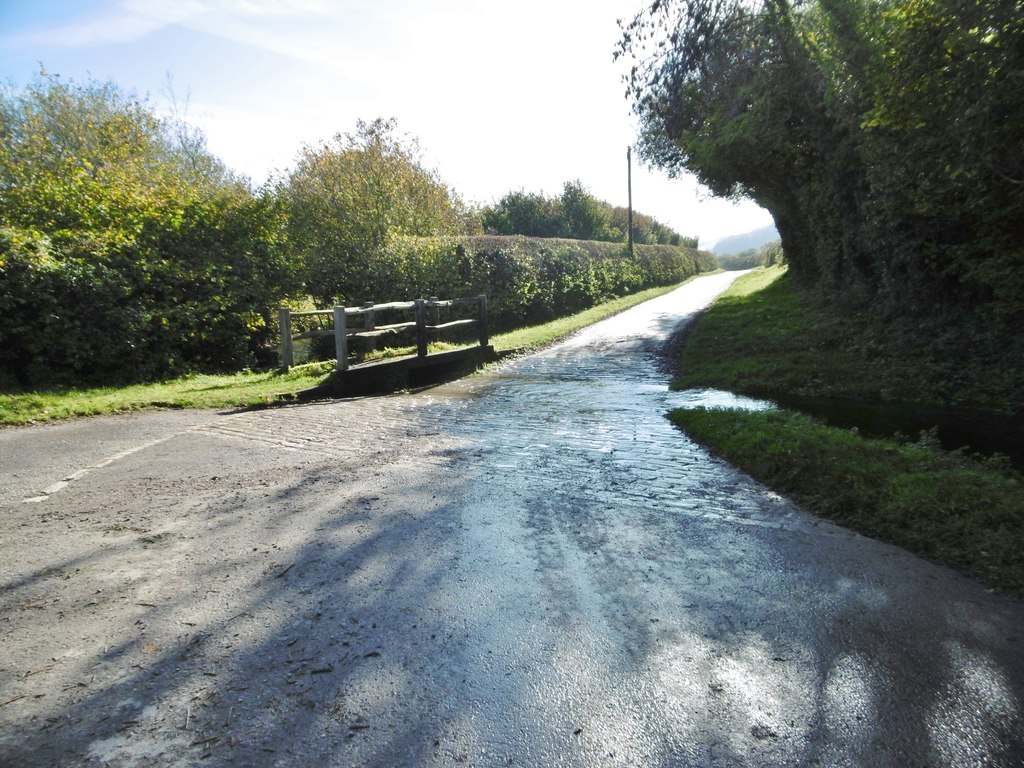
Up Sydling, ford & footbridge

Up Sydling is a hamlet in west Dorset, England. It is situated at the head of Sydling Water, a tributary of the River Frome, ten miles north of Dorchester. The hamlet is in the parish of Sydling St Nicholas, about a mile north of the village.
