= Grimstone, Dorset =

Hamlet in Dorset, England

Coordinates: 50.73°N 2.52°W

Grimstone
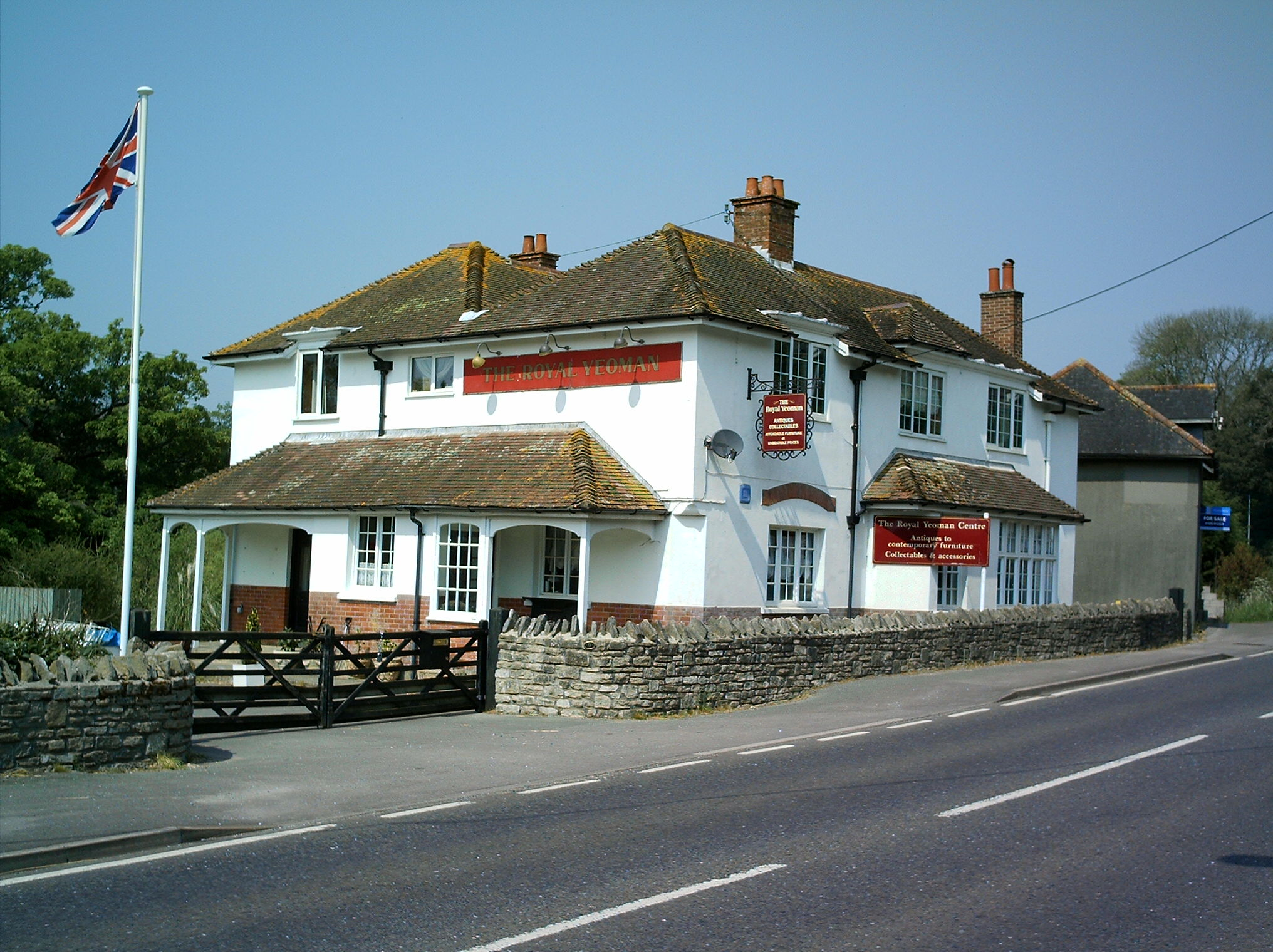
- The Royal Yeoman public house

- Location within Dorset
- OS grid reference: SY639941
- Civil parish: Stratton
- Unitary authority: Dorset
- Ceremonial county: Dorset
- Region: South West
- Country: England
- Sovereign state: United Kingdom
- Post town: Dorchester
- Postcode district: DT2
- Dialling code: 01305
- Police: Dorset
- Fire: Dorset and Wiltshire
- Ambulance: South Western
- UK Parliament: West Dorset
- Website: Stratton Dorset

Grimstone is a hamlet at the confluence of Sydling Water and the River Frome in the western part of the civil parish of Stratton, Dorset.

The Great Western Railway opened Grimstone and Frampton railway station and Grimstone Viaduct in 1857 and British Railways closed the station in 1966.

The hamlet is the home of Manor Foods, a catering company located at Manor Farm.

Grimstone's common lands were not enclosed until 1907.

== Gallery ==
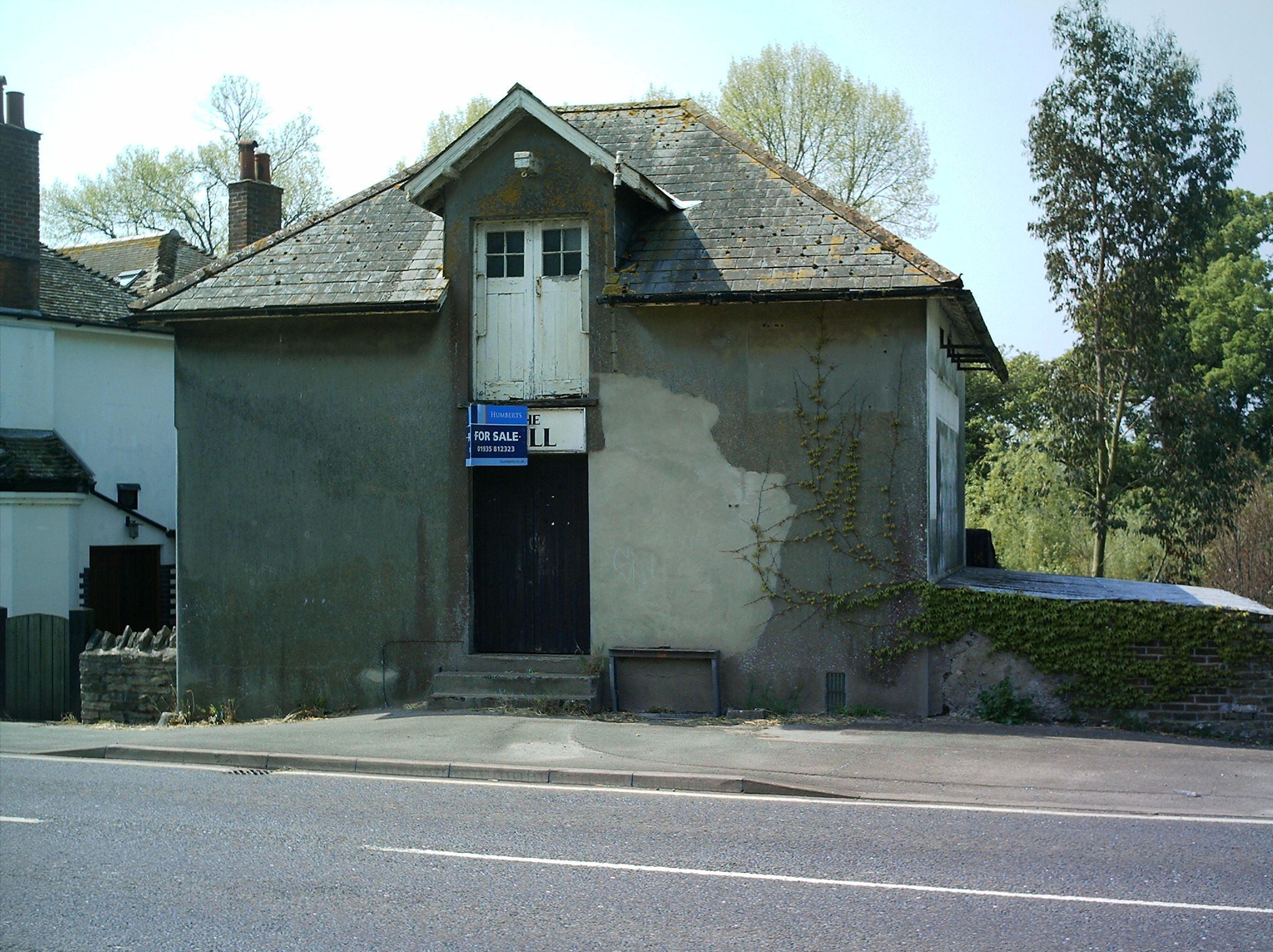
Former water mill

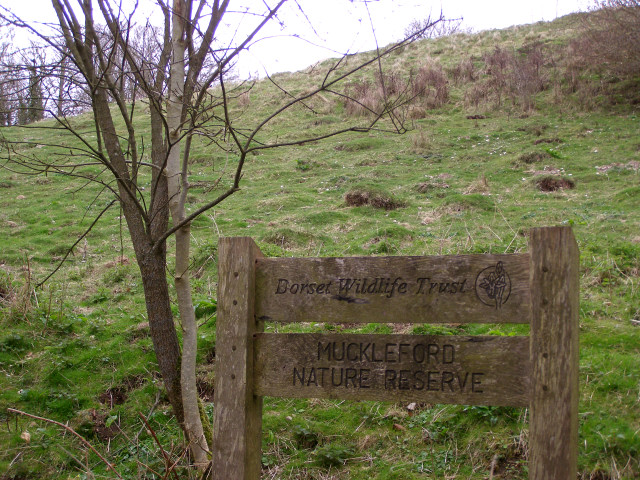
Muckleford Nature Reserve
