= Ridge, Dorset =

Village in Dorset, England

Coordinates: 50.6779°N 2.0945°W

Ridge
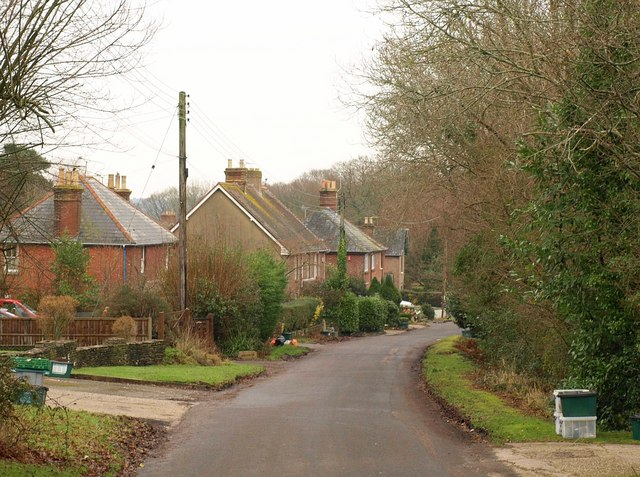
- Barnhill Road, Ridge

- Location within Dorset
- OS grid reference: SY932865
- Civil parish: Arne
- Unitary authority: Dorset
- Ceremonial county: Dorset
- Region: South West
- Country: England
- Sovereign state: United Kingdom
- Post town: WAREHAM
- Postcode district: BH20
- Dialling code: 01929
- Police: Dorset
- Fire: Dorset and Wiltshire
- Ambulance: South Western
- UK Parliament: Mid Dorset and North Poole

Ridge is a village in the English county of Dorset. It is situated on the south bank of the River Frome, about half a mile due south east of the town of Wareham.

Ridge forms part of the civil parish of Arne, within the Dorset unitary authority area.

A wharf on the River Frome at Ridge was once a major transhipment point for Purbeck Ball Clay. The clay was brought to the wharf by the Furzebrook Railway, and transferred to barges for the voyage to Poole Harbour. The railway is now abandoned, and the wharf has become a marina.

There is a camp site (Ridge Farm Camping & Caravan Park) and a caravan park (Treetops Caravan Park) on the northern boundary of the village.
