= Nunnery Mead =

Nature reserve in Dorset, England

- Location within Dorset
- OS grid: SY 615 954
- Coordinates: 50°45′25″N 2°32′50″W
- Area: 6 hectares (15 acres)
- Operator: Dorset Wildlife Trust
- Website: www.dorsetwildlifetrust.org.uk/nature-reserves/nunnery-mead

Nunnery Mead is a nature reserve of the Dorset Wildlife Trust, near Frampton and about 2 miles south-east of Maiden Newton, in Dorset, England. It is a former water-meadow, next to the River Frome. The reserve also contains the site of a Roman villa.

== Description ==
There is no allocated parking; visitors may walk here from nearby villages.

The area of the site is 6 hectares (15 acres). Most of this is a former water meadow, that floods seasonally. Birds to be found here include the song thrush all year, and the snipe in winter. The River Frome is on the northern boundary of the reserve; alongside the river is a strip of woodland, containing several tree species including ash and alder.

=== Roman villa ===
The Roman villa was discovered in 1796 and excavated by Samuel Lysons. The elaborately designed tesselated pavements revealed were inspected by George III in 1797. It was thought to have been destroyed in the mid-19th century, but was rediscovered in 2019 by archaeologists from Bournemouth University. Miles Russell, from the university, said: ".... the results, finding well-preserved walls and areas of surviving mosaic, were truly exceptional" – it was an "exciting and nationally important site." The site of the villa is protected as a scheduled monument.
