= Frampton Priory =

Former priory in Dorset

Coordinates: 50.753119°N 2.530211°W

Frampton Priory was a Benedictine priory in England, near the village of Frampton in Dorset and mentioned in the Domesday Book. The priory was subordinate to the Abbey of Saint-Étienne, in Caen, Normandy.

The land on which the priory stood was given to the Browne family after King Henry VIII's Dissolution of the Monasteries. Robert Browne built his residence Frampton Court at the priory's former location in 1705. Frampton Court was demolished in 1932.
