= Blue Pool, Dorset =

Lake in Dorset, England, UK

Coordinates: 50.6497°N 2.0933°W

Blue Pool
- Blue Pool in May 2026

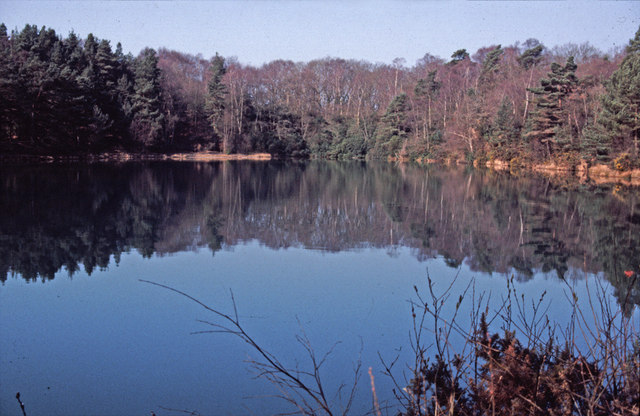
Blue Pool, Furzebrook, Dorset.

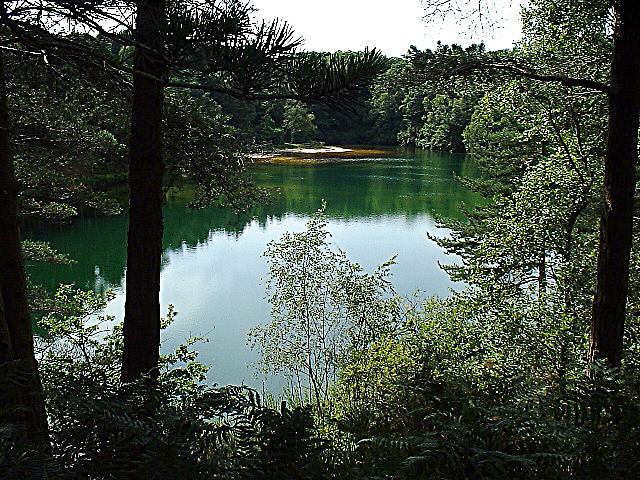
The Blue Pool, Furzebrook.

Blue Pool is a flooded, disused clay pit where Purbeck ball clay was once extracted. It is now a lake within the Furzebrook Estate, a 25-acre (10 ha) park of heath woodland and gorse near Furzebrook on the Isle of Purbeck, in the county of Dorset, southern England.

Furzebrook Estate is about 3 mi (5 km) south of Wareham and 2 mi (3 km) west of Corfe Castle.

The pool started life early in the 17th century as a chalk pit. Purbeck ball clay was dug from the pit from the mid-17th century to the early 20th century. The ball clay was used to make fine ceramic products, such as smoking pipes, plates, cups and tea pots. The pit became disused before the First World War, but ball clay is still extracted from other pits in the area.

The title 'blue' arose because there are minute particles of clay in colloidal suspension within the water. These suspensions variously diffract the light depending on the particles' size (with differences in size often linked to changes in concentration and pH), yielding colours from red-brown, through grey and green, to the more typical turquoise. The metallic blue sometimes found in photographs is more likely to be a reflection of the sky, as the attraction's own website makes no such claim for the water, and their leaflets call it “a turquoise jewel set in the heart of Purbeck”.

In 1935 a café was opened at the site. There is also a museum and gift shop. In 1985 the estate was declared a Site of Special Scientific Interest. Now law protects the habitat of a variety of rare plants and animals. The site includes nature reserves managed by the Amphibian and Reptile Conservation and a private nature reserve.

Blue Pool is now a popular tourist attraction, especially because it is a place of peace and tranquillity. The pool is surrounded by 25 acres (10 ha) of heathland. The nationally rare Dorset heath and marsh gentian are common to the area. The estate is crossed by a network of sandy paths. There are steps down to the edge of the pool and there are also steps on some paths around the pool, but there is also a completely flat route around the pool, which is suitable for wheelchairs.

The lush vegetation around the pool is inhabited by grey squirrels, rabbits and badgers. The Estate supports numerous rare birds, amphibians and reptiles. Visitors may therefore be lucky enough to spot the Dartford warbler or the nightjar. Both of Britain's endangered and protected reptiles, the green sand lizard and the smooth snake, live here in considerable numbers. There are also many dragonflies and the rare Sika deer.
