= Sydling St Nicholas =

Village in Dorset, England

Coordinates: 50.7931°N 2.5239°W

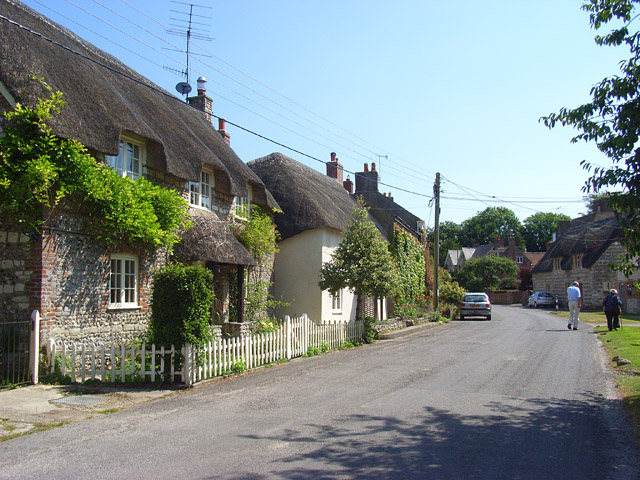
- High Street, Sydling St Nicholas

- Location within Dorset
- Population: 414
- OS grid reference: SY632995
- Unitary authority: Dorset
- Ceremonial county: Dorset
- Region: South West
- Country: England
- Sovereign state: United Kingdom
- Post town: Dorchester
- Postcode district: DT2
- Dialling code: 01300
- Police: Dorset
- Fire: Dorset and Wiltshire
- Ambulance: South Western
- UK Parliament: West Dorset
- Website: Village website

Sydling St Nicholas is a village and civil parish in Dorset within southwest England. The parish is 5 to 9 miles (8.0 to 14.5 km) northwest of the county town Dorchester and covers most of the valley of the small Sydling Water in the chalk hills of the Dorset Downs. The parish has an area of 2,075 hectares (5,130 acres) and includes the hamlet of Up Sydling in the north.

Sydling St Nicholas village was recorded in the 11th-century Domesday Book, though evidence of much earlier human occupation has been found in the surrounding area. Over the last thousand years the village has been owned by Milton Abbey, Sir Francis Walsingham and Winchester College.

The whole of Sydling St Nicholas parish lies within the Dorset National Landscape area. In addition, parts of the parish lie within the Hog Cliff National Nature Reserve and the Cerne and Sydling Downs Special Area of Conservation.

In the 2011 census the parish had a population of 414.

== Toponymy ==
'Sydling' derives from the Old English sīd and hlinc, which mean 'broad ridge' and refer to the hills around the village. In the 10th century the village was recorded as Sidelyng and in the Domesday Book of 1086 it was Sidelince. The second part of the name comes from the dedicated saint of the parish church.

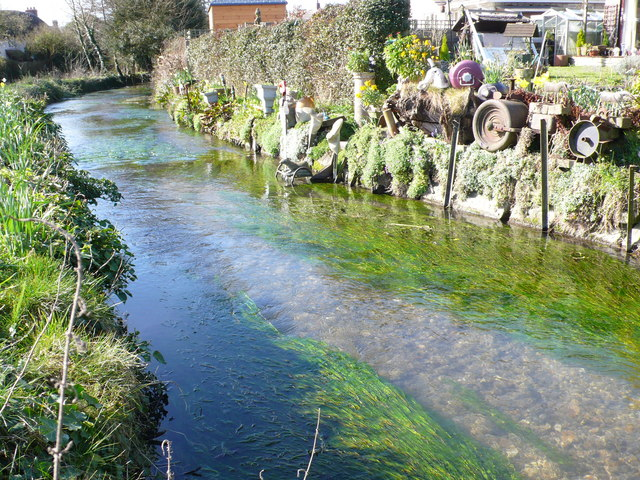
Sydling Water

== History ==
People have lived in the area for nearly 5,000 years, though in pre-Roman times human habitation was confined to the hilltops. Early artefacts found in the vicinity include Neolithic hand-axes and Bronze and Iron Age pottery. Evidence of an early village settlement exists at Shearplace Hill, about 0.75 miles (1.25 km) to the south-east of the current village. Remains of Celtic field systems have been found in the north and west of the parish. Saxon settlers arrived in the valley in the 7th or 8th century; evidence of their strip lynchets can still be seen on the surrounding hillsides. In 933 AD land was given to the monks at Milton Abbey, who provided the village with a priest.

The abbey was the lord of the village at the time of the Domesday Book in 1086, which recorded 54 households with a value to the abbey of £25. In subsequent centuries the village has been owned by Sir Francis Walsingham, Secretary of State to Queen Elizabeth, and by Winchester College.

Sir John Smith, 1st Baronet, lived in Sydling St Nicholas and the Smith family remained a leading local family through the 18th and 19th centuries, with a number of memorials in the parish church.

Sydling St Nicholas once constituted a liberty, containing only the parish itself.

== Geography ==
Sydling St Nicholas is sited in the valley of Sydling Water, a tributary of the River Frome. The valley is one of several roughly parallel valleys which cut into the dip slope of the Dorset Downs, a line of chalk hills that span the centre of the county. The village lies at an altitude of 110 metres (360 ft) and the surrounding chalk hills rise to 265 metres (869 ft) at Gore Hill to the north. The hills and all of the civil parish lie within the Dorset National Landscape area. In the south of the parish and within the Cerne and Sydling Downs Special Area of Conservation are two parts of the three-part Hog Cliff National Nature Reserve (the third part lies within the neighbouring parish of Maiden Newton).

Measured directly, Sydling St Nicholas village is 6.5 miles (10.5 km) NW of Dorchester, 11 miles (18 km) ENE of Bridport and 11.5 miles (18.5 km) SSE of Yeovil. The A37 Dorchester-Yeovil main road runs along the top of the hills about 1 mile (1.6 km) to the west of the village.

=== Sydling Water ===
Sydling Water is a chalk stream that rises just to the north of Sydling St Nicholas in the hamlet of Up Sydling. The stream divides upon entering the village, and many cottages are reached across small bridges. The stream used to flow along the High Street in an open course, resulting in occasional floods; after a thunderstorm in June 1889 one local man, Tom Churchill, drowned after having been swept away, and his body was found about a mile downstream. Today Sydling Water is known for its watercress farms.

== Notable buildings ==
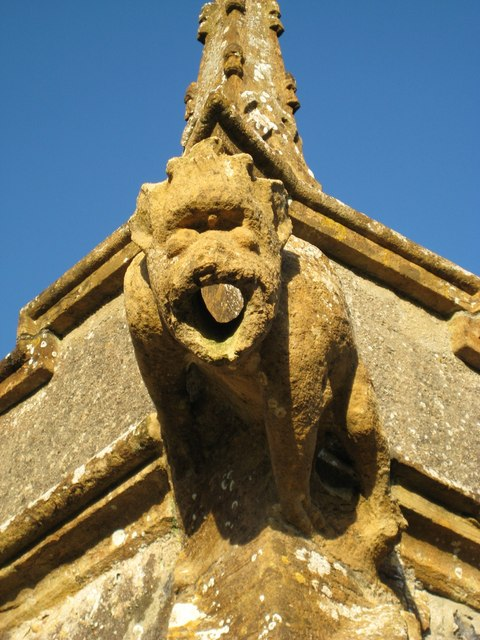
One of the gargoyles on the parish church

Within the parish are more than fifty structures listed by Historic England for their architectural or historic interest. In 1905 Sir Frederick Treves described the village as "the most charming in the district".

The 15th-century parish church of St Nicholas, which is built on slightly higher ground than most of the houses in the village, replaces at least two other buildings previously built on the site. It possesses a Norman font and a fine tower. The tower clock has no face and dates from 1593, making it one of the oldest in England. The south aisle has settled since construction, so the south wall is buttressed and has only a small door. In 1905 Treves described the church as being "quite famous for its numerous and amazing gargoyles", although seventy-five years later Dorset-based writer Roland Gant noted it instead for being "Light, open, airy, free of restorers' excesses", and for possessing a "noble wagon-roof" in the nave. The church is a Grade I listed building.

Next to the church are Court House and Court Farm. Court House is the village manor house and was the venue for meetings of the local Court leet. Court Farm has a large Elizabethan tithe barn which overlooks the churchyard; it was built in 1590 and constructed from flint, with stone buttresses and oak roof beams. In his 18th-century History and Antiquities of the County of Dorset, John Hutchins stated that one of the beams in the barn was inscribed with 'L.V.W. 1590', the initials being those of Lady Ursula Walsingham, though searches by subsequent writers have failed to find them, and the beam may have been removed when the roof thatch was removed in the 20th century.

The Old Vicarage is based on an early Tudor building which was expanded and altered in 1640. Adjoining it is the mullioned old bakery, dating from 1733 upon a 17th-century core.

== In literature and film ==
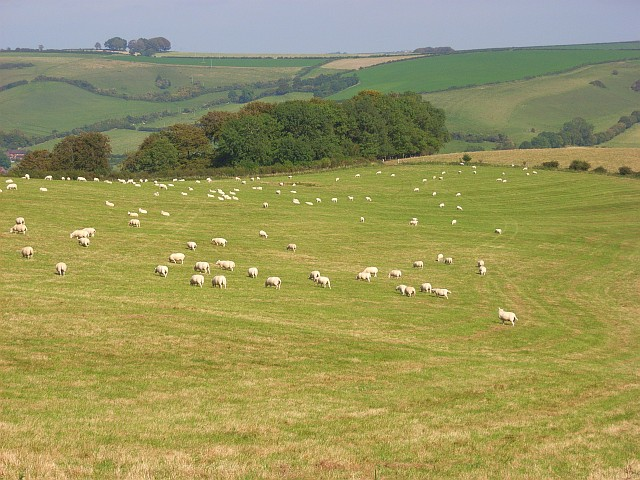
Looking ENE from Combe Hill across the Sydling valley towards Eastfield Hill and Cowdown Hill.

Thomas Hardy names the village as Sidlinch or Broad Sidlinch in his story 'The Grave by the Handpost' (1897) published in The Changed Man and Other Tales (1913). These names are reminiscent of previous forms of the village's name, such as 'Broadsidlynch' in 1333 and 'Brodesedelyng', in a legal record, in Latin, dated 1440, where John Tidde was a clerk.

The parish church was used as a location in the 1967 film adaptation of Hardy's Far From the Madding Crowd, in a scene that involved water pouring from one of the church's gargoyles onto the grave of Fanny Robin.

The Sydling valley is used as a location within Geoffrey Household's 1939 novel Rogue Male.

== Demography ==
In the 2011 census Sydling St Nicholas parish had a population of 414 in 206 dwellings, with 89.8% of households having at least one usual resident. The average age of the population was 46.6, compared to 39.3 for England as a whole; 26.1% of residents were 65 years old or older, compared to 16.4% for England as a whole.

The historic population of Sydling St Nicholas parish from the censuses between 1921 and 2001 is shown in the table below.

Census Population of Sydling St Nicholas Parish 1921—2001 (except 1941)
Census	1921	1931	1951	1961	1971	1981	1991	2001
Population	346	341	383	338	320	320	380	400
Source:Dorset County Council

== See also ==
- List of liberties in Dorset.
