= Furzebrook Railway =

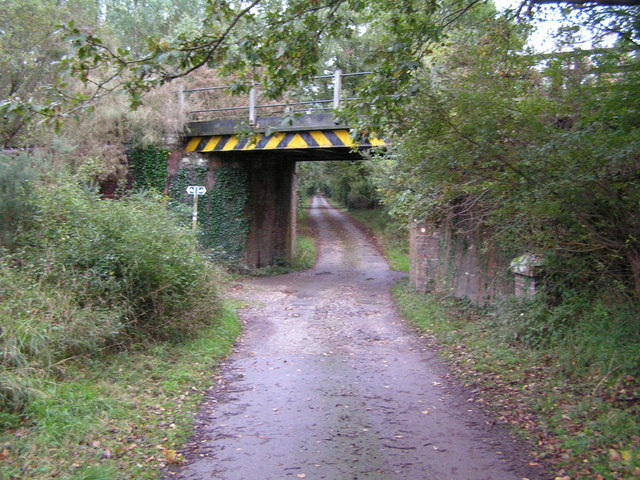
- Swanage Railway overpass.

Overview
- Headquarters: Furzebrook
- Locale: England
- Dates of operation: c.1840–1957
- Successor: Abandoned

Technical
- Track gauge: c.4 ft (1,219 mm) (1840); 2 ft 8 in (813 mm) (1866)
- Length: 3.5 miles (5.6 km)

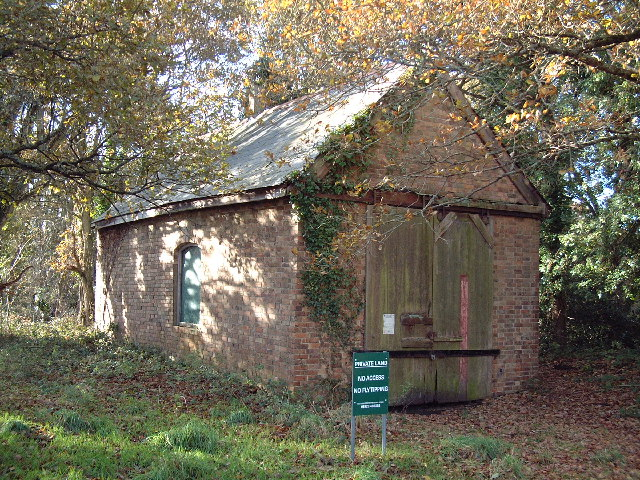
The engine shed at Ridge. The line passed just to the left of the building.

The Furzebrook Railway, also known as the Pike Brothers' Tramway, was a narrow gauge industrial railway on the Isle of Purbeck in the English county of Dorset. It was built by the Pike Brothers, to take Purbeck Ball Clay from their clay pits near Furzebrook and West Creech to a wharf at Ridge on the River Frome.

== History ==
Clay Merchant Joseph Pike created his firm around 1760 in Chudleigh in Devon, but it was his son William Pike (born 1762) who started a branch of the firm in Purbeck. He signed a contract with Wedgwood in 1791. Originally the output was taken by horse to Wareham, from where it was taken by barge on the River Frome to Poole Harbour. William's sons (William Joseph and John William) took over the business and formed the company as Pike Bros. Wedgwood's success increased demand so much that the horses struggled to keep pace.

The nearest competitor, Benjamin Fayle at nearby Norden, had built Dorset's first railway – the Middlebere Plateway – to take his clay to the south shore of Poole Harbour in 1806. Around 1840 the Pike Brothers William Joseph and John William followed suit by building the Furzebrook Railway to Ridge, about half a mile downstream from Wareham. The line was engineered with a continual downhill gradient, and loaded clay wagons were run by gravity, with the empty wagons being hauled back by horses. To facilitate this, some wagons were equipped with sledge brakes acting directly on the rail. The gauge of the railway as built is believed to be around 4 ft (1,219 mm).

William Joseph Pike met with George Stephenson in Birmingham and became convinced that way forward lay in the excellent economics of steam railways. In 1865 the Pike Brothers purchased the first steam locomotive (Primus) and by this date the gauge had been narrowed to 2 ft 8 in (813 mm). By this time, the original workings at the "Blue Pool" in Furzebrook were worked out, and the railway was diverted to the west at its upper end, and extended with several branches serving clay pits at Povington, Cotness, Greenspecks and Creech Grange.

When it opened in 1885, the London and South Western Railway standard gauge line from Wareham to Swanage simply passed over the Furzebrook Railway, with no connection. However, in 1902, interchange sidings were constructed at Furzebrook to allow clay to be shipped out by main line rail. A new locomotive shed and workshops were built at the interchange point.

Even after steam locomotives were introduced, gravity propulsion was not entirely abandoned. Up to the Second World War, a well known sight was a single wagon train carrying clay pit workers back to their homes in Ridge in this way. The line terminated at the Swanage Railway branch, with the line to Ridge being removed by the military. In 1955 road transport started to be used to transport the clay, and the last use of the Furzebrook Railway was in 1957.

== Locomotives ==
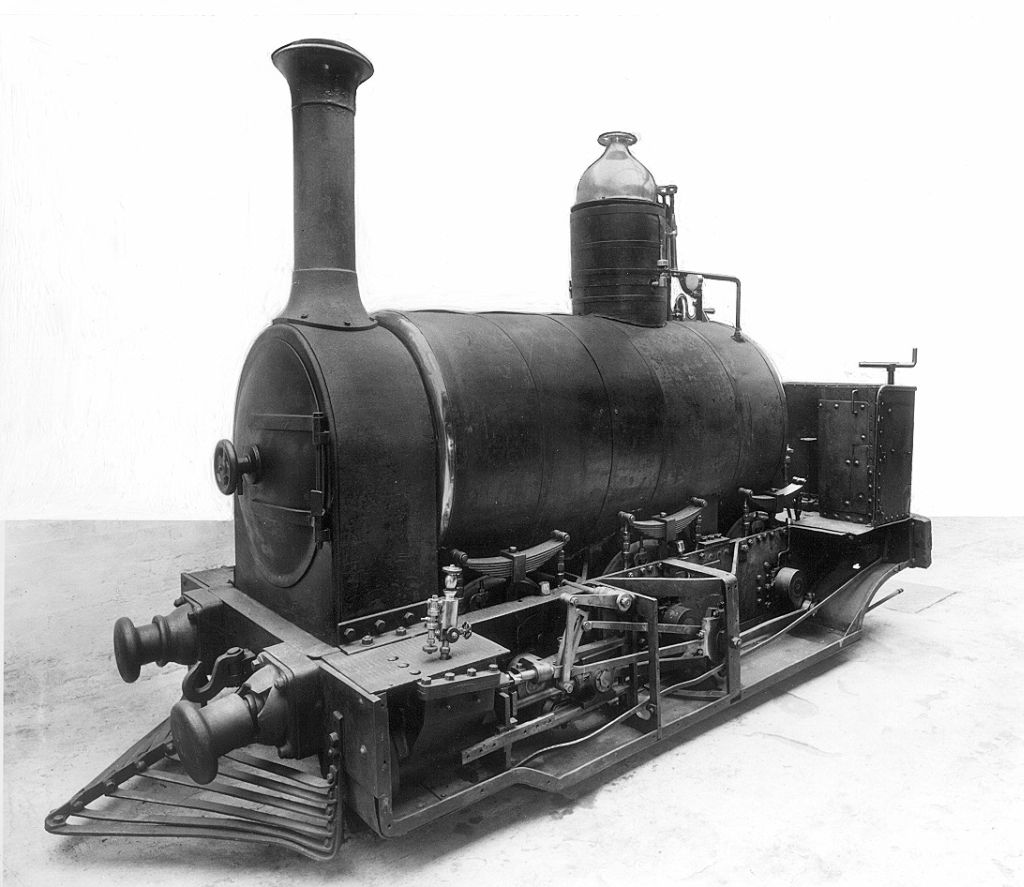
An undated picture of Secundus

The locomotives used by the railway include:

Name	Builder	Type	Date	Works number	Notes
Primus	Belliss and Seeking	0-4-2WT	1866		Converted to a stationary winding engine by 1888.
Secundus	G. E. Belliss and Co.	0-6-0WT	1874		In use until 1955, and then displayed in the now defunct Birmingham Museum of Science and Industry until 2000. Is now displayed in the Swanage Railway museum at Corfe Castle station.
Tertius	Manning Wardle	0-6-0ST	1886	999	In 1951 the boiler from Fayle's Tramway engine Tiny was fitted, giving this engine a top heavy look as the firebox was too wide to fit through the frames.
Quartus	Fowler	0-4-2WT	1889		Scrapped in 1934.
Quintus	Manning Wardle	0-4-0ST	1914	1854	In use until 1956, scrapped in 1958. Nameplate is preserved in NGRM
Sextus	Peckett	0-6-0ST	1925	1692	In use until 1956, scrapped in 1958.
Septimus	Peckett	0-4-2ST	1930	1808	Purchased for the proposed North Somerset Light Railway in 1955 but never used. Scrapped in 1962.
	Simplex	4wDM			Diesel locomotive obtained second hand in 1951.

== Remains ==
The line's engine shed at Ridge still exists, and is a listed building. The route of the line from Ridge to Furzebrook can be traced on the ground and on maps. As noted above, the steam locomotive Secundus has survived.

A weighbridge building of similar design to the Ridge engine shed also survives at Furzebrook Works, adjacent to the former Furzebrook Road level crossing.

== See also ==
- British industrial narrow gauge railways

== Bibliography ==
- Peters, Ivo (1976). The Narrow Gauge Charm of Yesterday: A Pictorial Tribute. The Oxford Publishing Company. ISBN 0-902888-65-X.
- Kidner, R.W. (2000). The Railways of Purbeck (Third ed.). The Oakwood Press. ISBN 0-85361-557-8.
