= East Stoke, Dorset =

Coordinates: 50.6787°N 2.183°W

East Stoke
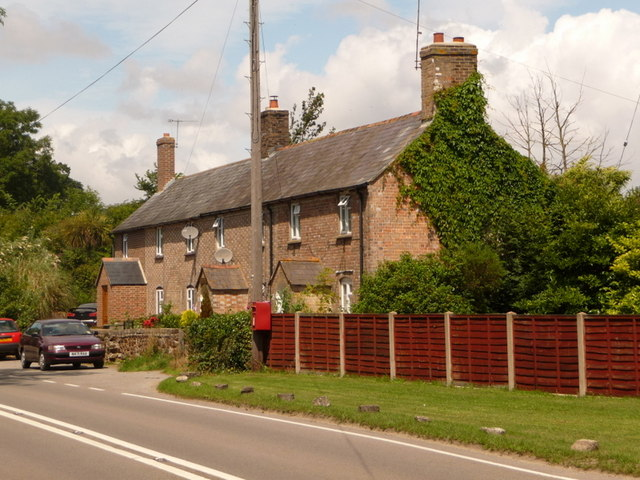
- Stokeford, East Stoke

- Location within Dorset
- Population: 410 (2013 estimate)
- OS grid reference: SY872862
- Unitary authority: Dorset
- Ceremonial county: Dorset
- Region: South West
- Country: England
- Sovereign state: United Kingdom
- Post town: Wareham
- Postcode district: BH20
- Police: Dorset
- Fire: Dorset and Wiltshire
- Ambulance: South Western
- UK Parliament: South Dorset

East Stoke is a village in the English county of Dorset. It lies three miles west of the small town of Wareham and two miles east of Wool. In 2013 the estimated population of the civil parish was 410.

The Freshwater Biological Association runs a research centre on the banks of the River Frome, from which the Game & Wildlife Conservation Trust runs its research into atlantic salmon declines.
