= Grimstone Viaduct =

Railway viaduct in Stratton, Dorset, England

Coordinates: 50°44′56.9″N 2°30′42.3″W

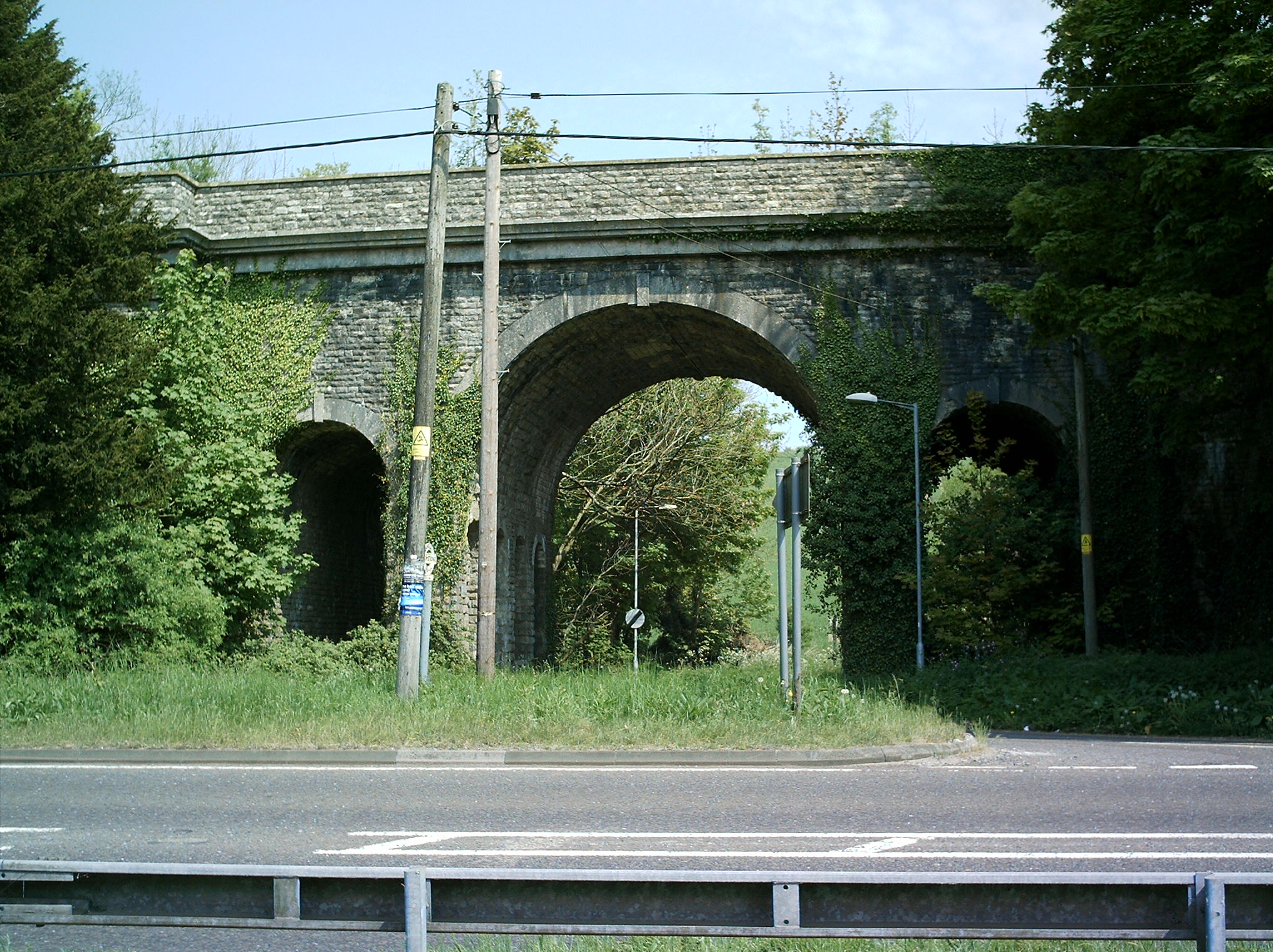
From the West

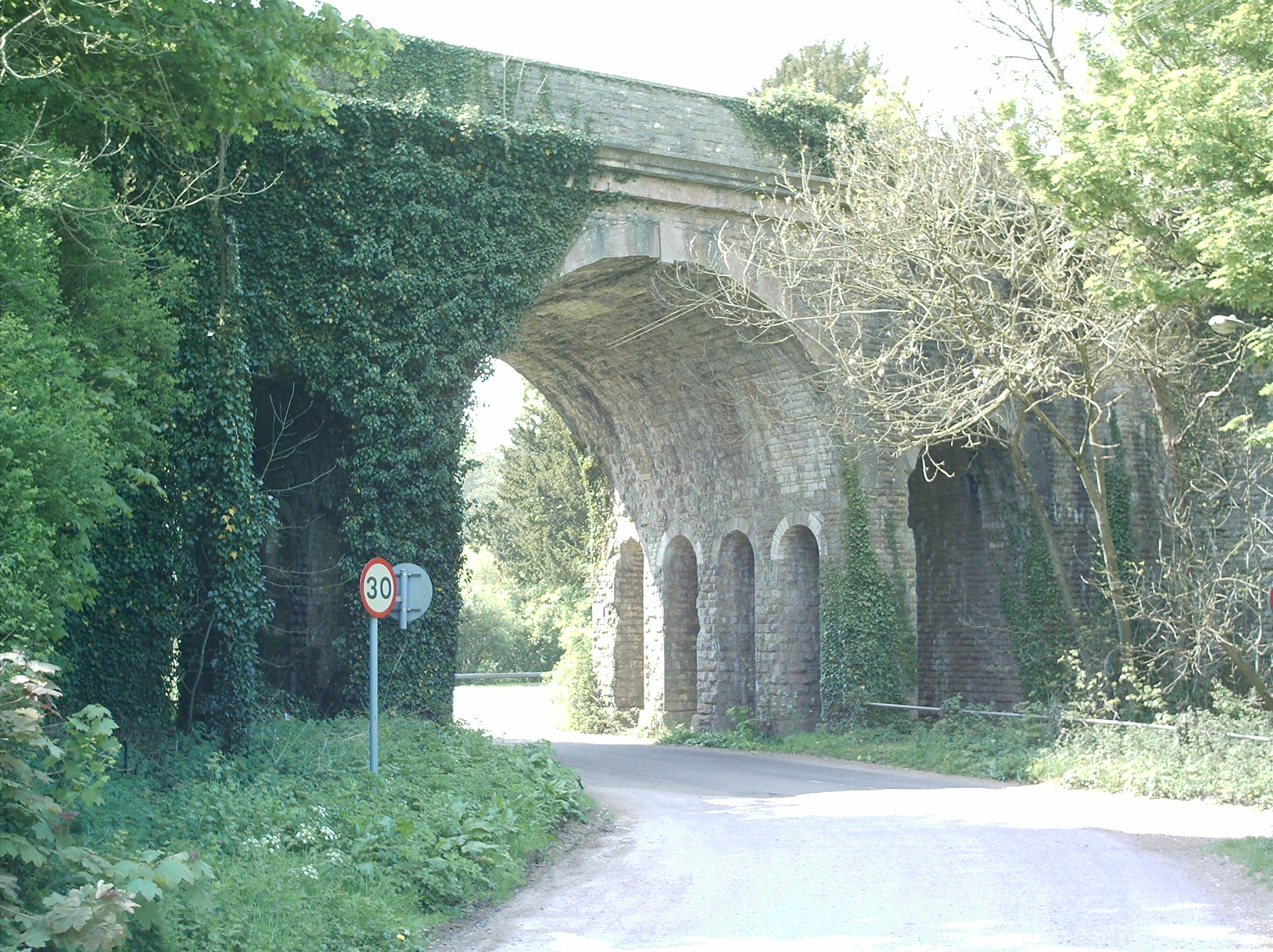
From the East

Grimstone Viaduct is a railway bridge at Grimstone (near Dorchester) in Dorset, south-western England. It carries the Heart of Wessex Line over a road junction off the A37 road. It is directly north of the site of the closed Grimstone and Frampton railway station.

== History ==
The viaduct was built for the Wilts, Somerset and Weymouth Railway (WSWR) whose line provided a connection between the ports of Bristol (on the west coast) and Weymouth on the south. The WSWR was under the influence of the Great Western Railway (GWR). Thus, the viaduct was designed by the GWR's chief engineer, Isambard Kingdom Brunel. It opened in 1857.

== Description ==
The bridge is built in a classical style. It carries the railway over a road junction just off the A37 road and a stream. It consists of three arches—the central arch, spanning the road, is round-headed and much the largest. It is flanked by a smaller arch on each side, one of which spans Sydling Water, a minor river. The piers of the main arch contain four relieving arches, all round-headed and similar to the flanking arches; the outer arches are heavier and square. The whole structure is built from blocks of stone and faced with rock. The arches have ashlar stone voussoirs, above which is a moulded cornice and band course (a line of decorative stonework), surmounted by a low parapet. The surrounding embankment is retained by substantial wing walls, curved and coped to form a revetment.

The viaduct is a Grade II listed building, first designated on 20 May 1985. Listed status provides it with legal protection.
