= Furzebrook, Dorset =

Village in Dorset, England

Coordinates: 50.6526°N 2.0981°W

Furzebrook
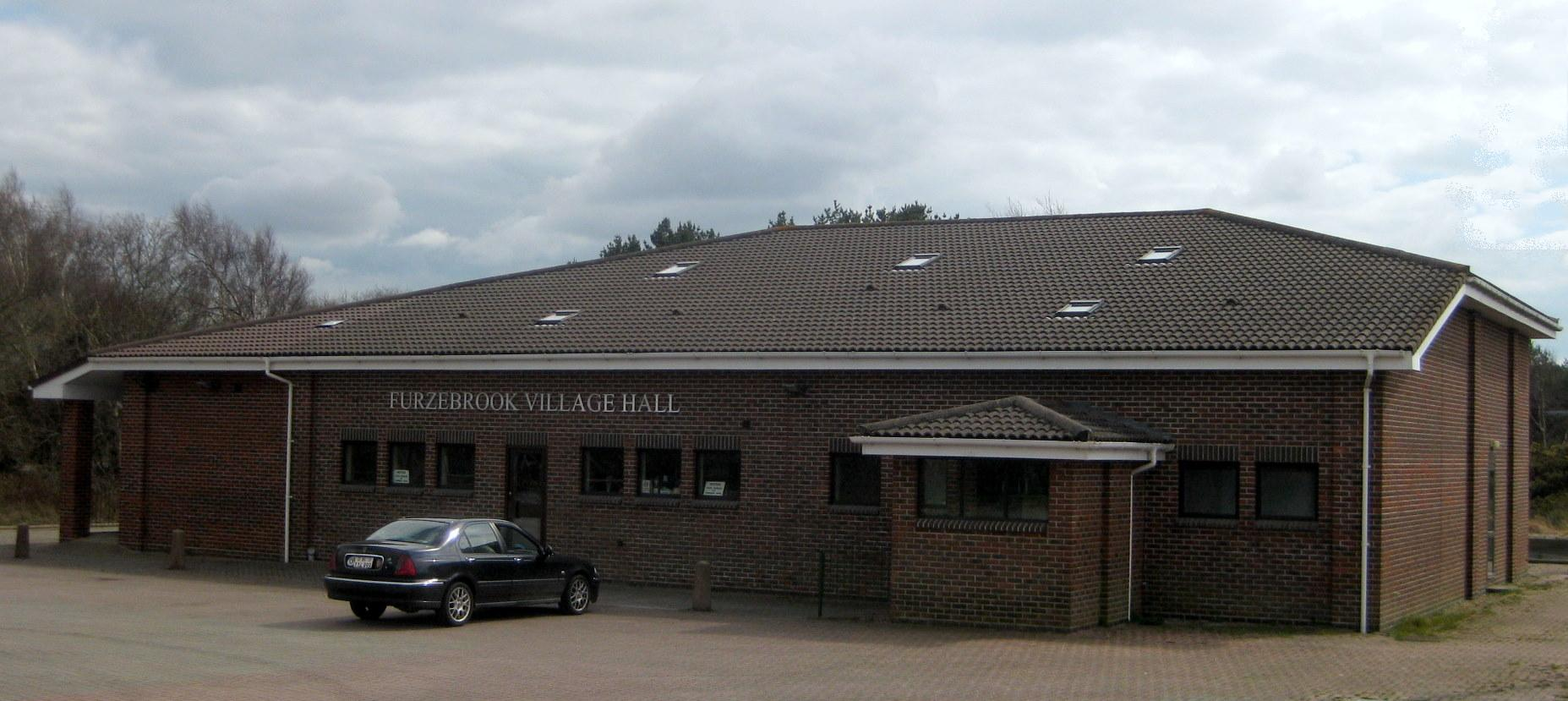
- Furzebrook Village Hall

- Location within Dorset
- OS grid reference: SY930837
- Civil parish: Church Knowle
- Unitary authority: Dorset
- Ceremonial county: Dorset
- Region: South West
- Country: England
- Sovereign state: United Kingdom
- Post town: WAREHAM
- Postcode district: BH20
- Dialling code: 01929
- Police: Dorset
- Fire: Dorset and Wiltshire
- Ambulance: South Western
- UK Parliament: South Dorset

Furzebrook is a village on the Isle of Purbeck, in the county of Dorset in the south of England. It is about 2 miles (3.2 km) south of Wareham and 2 miles (3.2 km) northwest of Corfe Castle, and is in the civil parish of Church Knowle.

The name Furzebrook derives from the furze/gorse and a brook. The first use of the name was probably by Furzebrook Farm. Furzebrook became the centre of the clay industry as all the local Purbeck Ball Clay was taken there to ripen by exposure. The clay was repeatedly turned for six months. As the ball clay ripened it acquired plasticity and became suitable to mix with various other clays which made them more plastic.

At Furzebrook there are several narrow-gauge railway tracks; these converged from outlying local mines and claypits. The Furzebrook Railway, a further narrow-gauge line ran to Ridge Wharf.

As the Wareham to Swanage branch line of the London and South Western Railway was built it passed through Furzebrook and therefore a lot of clay was transferred via the mainline trains. Furzebrook is known as the railhead for the oil extracted from the local Wytch Farm oil well.

== See also ==
- Blue Pool is part of the Furzebrook area
- Furzebrook Railway, also known as the Pike Brothers' Tramway
