= Bradford Peverell & Stratton Halt =

Disused railway station in Dorset, England

Coordinates: 50.74170°N 2.48832°W

Bradford Peverell and Stratton Halt was a station on the Great Western Railway on what had originally been part of the Wiltshire, Somerset & Weymouth Railway. It was in the parish of Stratton, just east of the main part of the village but also close to the parish of Bradford Peverell which it was also intended to serve. The relatively modern looking concrete platforms and shelters, standard products of the former Southern Railway concrete factory at Exmouth Junction, can still be seen next to the bridge carrying the line over the A37 Dorchester - Yeovil road.

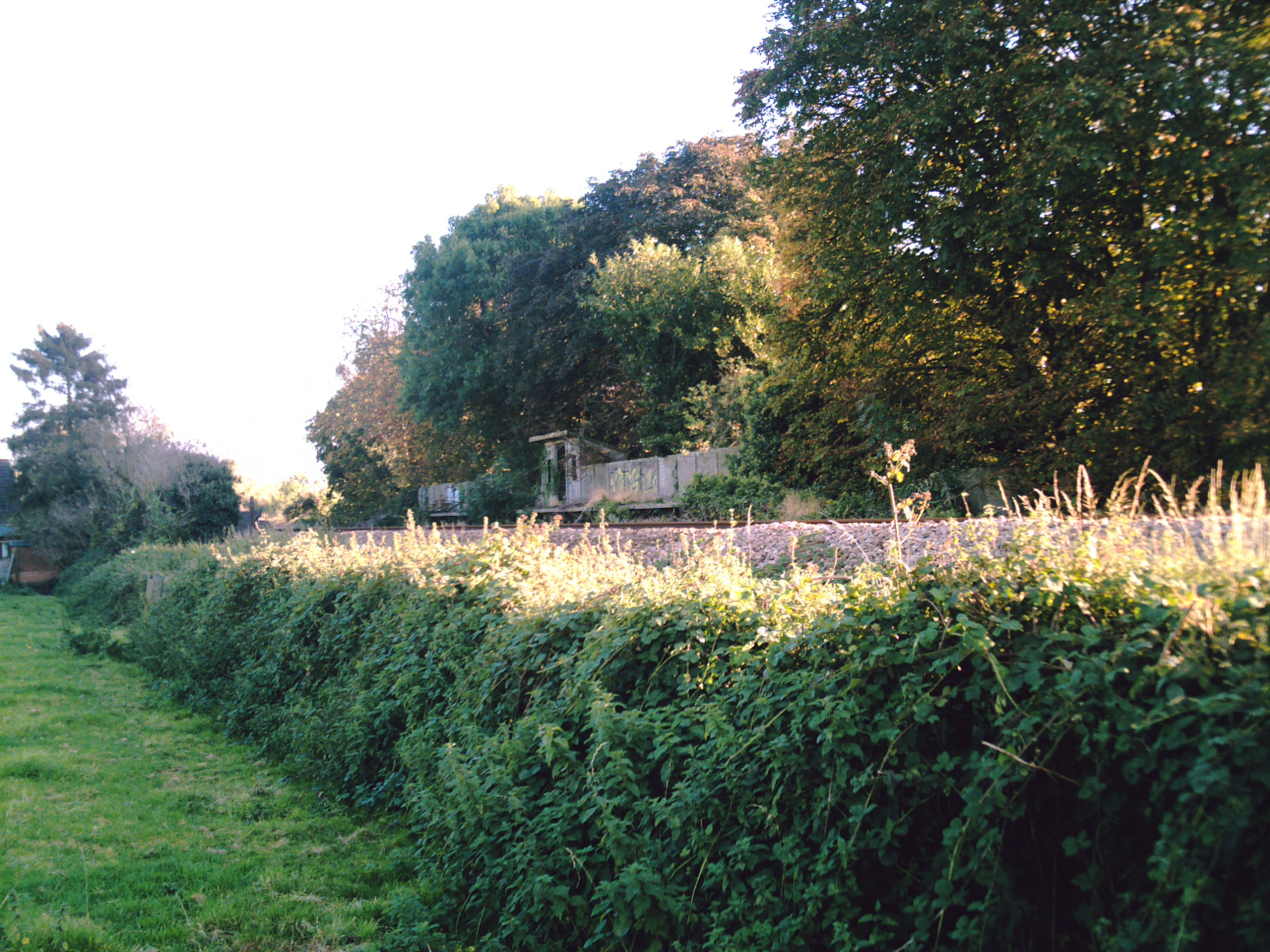
The remains of the halt, September 2007

== History ==
Opened on 22 May 1933 by the Great Western Railway, it was placed in the Western Region when the railways were nationalised in 1948. The station closed when local trains were withdrawn during the Beeching Axe, taking effect on 3 October 1966.

Preceding station	Historical railways	Following station
Grimstone and Frampton; Line open, station closed	Great Western Railway; Wilts, Somerset and Weymouth Railway	Dorchester West; Line and station open
