= Church Knowle =

Village and civil parish in Somerset, England

Coordinates: 50.6359°N 2.0866°W

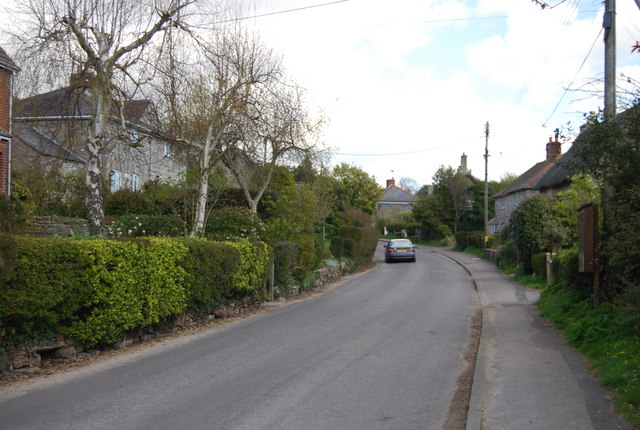
- Road through Church Knowle

- Location within Dorset
- Population: 261
- OS grid reference: SY939817
- Civil parish: Church Knowle
- Unitary authority: Dorset
- Ceremonial county: Dorset
- Region: South West
- Country: England
- Sovereign state: United Kingdom
- Post town: WAREHAM
- Postcode district: BH20
- Dialling code: 01929
- Police: Dorset
- Fire: Dorset and Wiltshire
- Ambulance: South Western
- UK Parliament: South Dorset

Church Knowle is a village and civil parish on the Isle of Purbeck in the county of Dorset in the south of England.

Church Knowle village is situated about 1 mile (1.6 km) west of Corfe Castle, 4 miles (6.4 km) south of Wareham and 6 miles (9.7 km) west of Swanage. In the 2011 census the parish—which includes the settlements of East Creech and Furzebrook to the north—had 114 households and a population of 261.

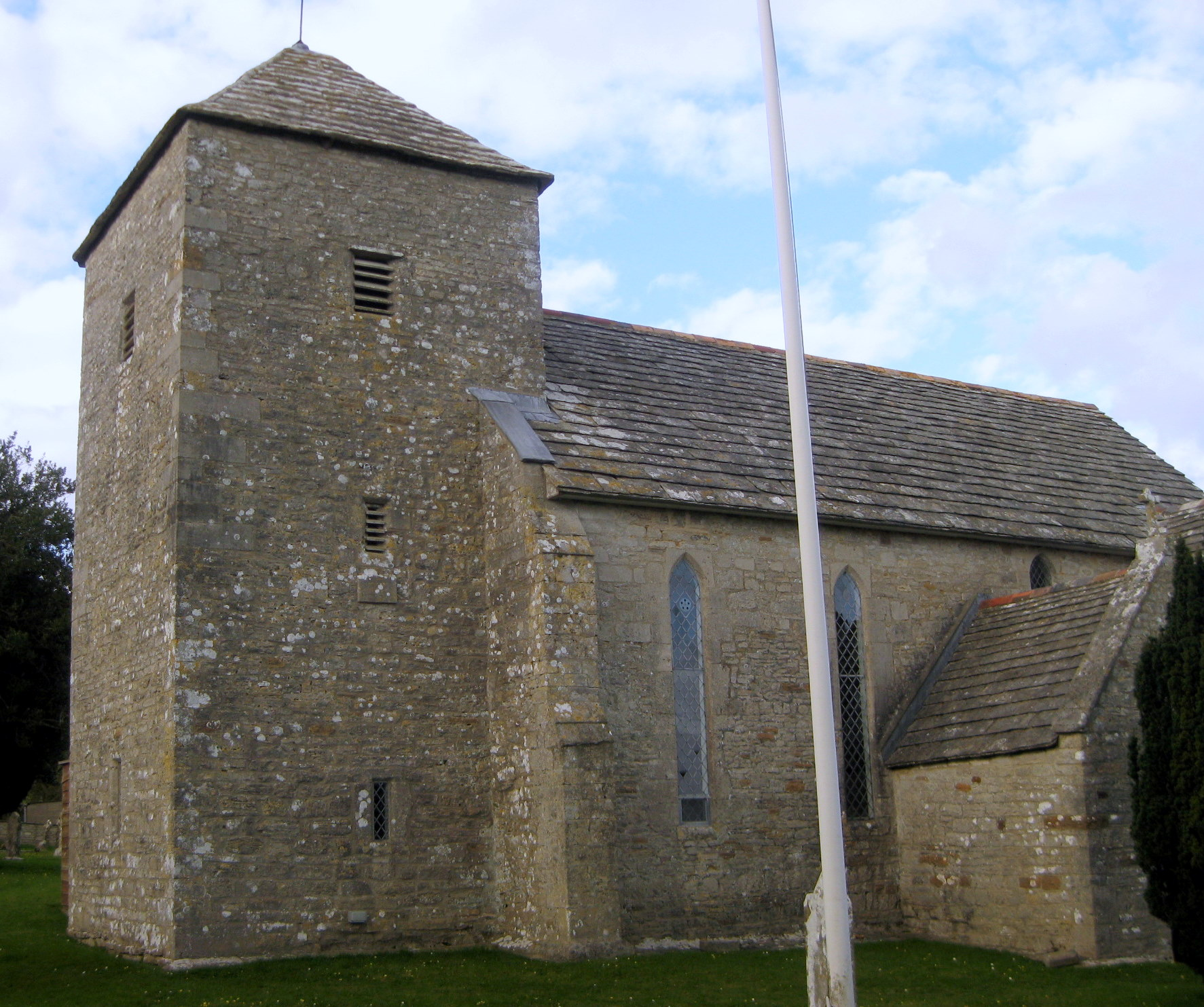
Church Knowle, St Peter's Church

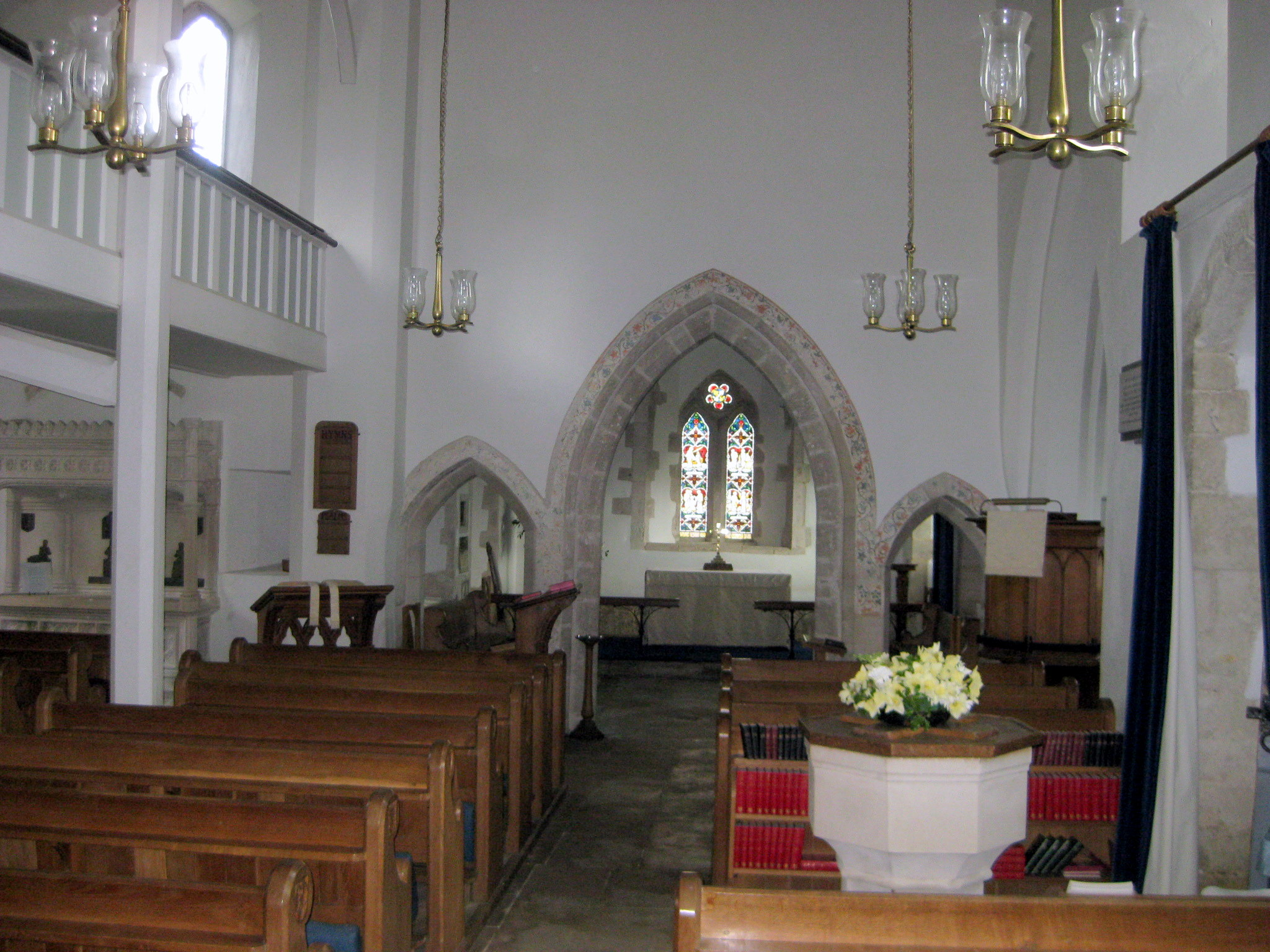
St Peter's Church, inside view

The church is named Saint Peter's Church. Church Knowle Fete is held in the grounds of the Old Rectory every August.

== Pike family ==
Buried in the Churchyard at Church Knowle are the two brothers who brought the first steam locomotive (Primus) to Purbeck in 1866 – The Pike Brothers – John William and William Joseph Pike (Purbeck Ball Clay Merchants). They are buried together with their relatives. John is buried with his mother-in-law Charlotte Bridges Mayer, who was the daughter of William Adams of London and wife of the potter Thomas Mayer. John lived at Westport House in Wareham, now the site of the home of Purbeck District Council. William Joseph lived in North Street Wareham. William Joseph's 7-year-old son was drowned in Studland Bay and is buried alongside his father. John and William Joseph's clay merchant father – William lived nearby at Bucknowle House and it was here that the Pike Brothers were born. William Pike's father-in-law was Jacob Warburton who founded the New Hall Pottery in Staffordshire and also leased Bucknowle Farm when he retired to be close to his daughters, Ann and Catherine. Catherine had married local land owner William Voss.

Warburton Pike was born at Church Knowle and was another son of William Pike. He was educated at University College London and went on to the Middle Temple where he was certified as a Special Pleader. In 1879 Pike published "Translations from Dante, Petrarch, Michael Angelo and Vittoria Colonna" and went on to be the first person to translate Dante's "Inferno" into English in 1881. Although he died in Highgate, he is buried alongside his family in St. Peter's graveyard.

== 1945 Air Disaster ==
On 15 June 1945 a Royal Air Force, Consolidated Liberator C Mk IX (JT985) crashed in the village of Kingston near Church Knowle while on a flight from RAF Holmsley South to Palam, Delhi India via RAF Castel Benito, Libya. The aircraft had low fuel pressure and attempted to return to RAF Holmsley in bad weather. All 27 on board the aircraft died in the crash.
