= Sydling Water =

River in Dorset, England

Coordinates: 50.807°N 2.525°W

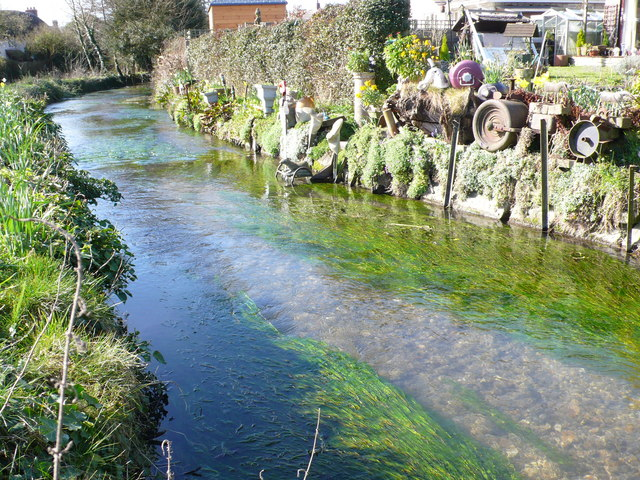
Sydling Water at Sydling St Nicholas

The Sydling Water is an 8 km (5 mi) long chalk stream in Dorset, England, which flows from north to south from Up Sydling until it joins the River Frome near Grimstone.

The source of the river is a spring at Up Sydling. It passes the deserted mediaeval village of Elston and is then crossed at a ford by the road from Marrs Cross to Cerne Abbas. It then flows through the village of Sydling St Nicholas and through rural countryside until it goes under Grimstone Viaduct and soon afterwards into the River Frome near Grimstone. The 'valley road' south of the village of Sydling St Nicholas closely follows the river until it reaches Grimstone.

The river is known for its watercress farms and trout. Grey herons and little egrets are common sights.
