= Frampton, Dorset =

Village and civil parish in Dorset, England

Coordinates: 50.7529°N 2.5307°W

Frampton
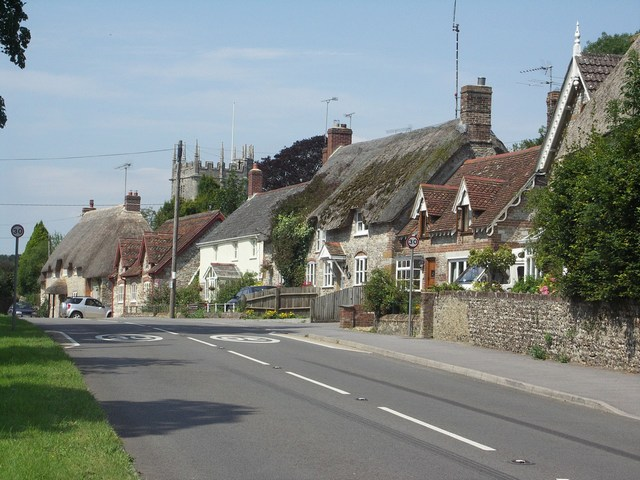
- Houses in Frampton

- Location within Dorset
- Population: 524
- OS grid reference: SY627949
- Unitary authority: Dorset
- Ceremonial county: Dorset
- Region: South West
- Country: England
- Sovereign state: United Kingdom
- Post town: Dorchester
- Postcode district: DT2
- Dialling code: 01300
- Police: Dorset
- Fire: Dorset and Wiltshire
- Ambulance: South Western
- UK Parliament: West Dorset

Frampton is a village and civil parish in the county of Dorset in southern England, situated approximately 5 miles (8.0 km) northwest of the county town Dorchester. It is sited in the Frome valley among chalk hills of the Dorset Downs. The village's name is a derivation from "Frome Town".

The A356 main road and the Heart of Wessex railway line run through the village; the nearest railway station is approximately 2.5 miles (4.0 km) away at Maiden Newton. In the 2011 census the parish had a population of 524. Frampton was once the centre of a Liberty of the same name.

Roman tessellated pavements have been found at Frampton, depicting one of the earliest known Christian symbols in England. In 1704 Robert Browne built Frampton Court in the vicinity of the village. The site was where there had at one time been a cell of the Abbey of Saint-Étienne in Caen, Normandy. In the nineteenth century the Game Laws, which govern English field sports, were drafted at the Court. Many of the cottages in the village are from the Frampton estate. Around 1840 the owner of the Court demolished many houses in the village (on the south side of the main road) and replaced them with trees, to improve the view from the Court. Today the legacy of the Court and its park is that the valley around Frampton is still well-wooded, and most of the houses in the village lie to the north of the main road. Frampton Court itself was demolished in 1935.

Frampton includes the small hamlet of Southover on the south side of the river. This previously comprised two farms—Southover Farm and Longlands Farm—and accompanying labourers cottages, plus a large private house with tiered gardens and an orchard. Today the agricultural basis of Southover has declined and most of the cottages and houses are in private hands.

Nunnery Mead, a nature reserve managed by the Dorset Wildlife Trust, is near the village. It includes the site of Frampton Roman Villa, a scheduled monument.

== See also ==
- Frampton Priory
- List of hundreds in Dorset
