= Purbeck Ball Clay =

Ball clay found on the Isle of Purbeck

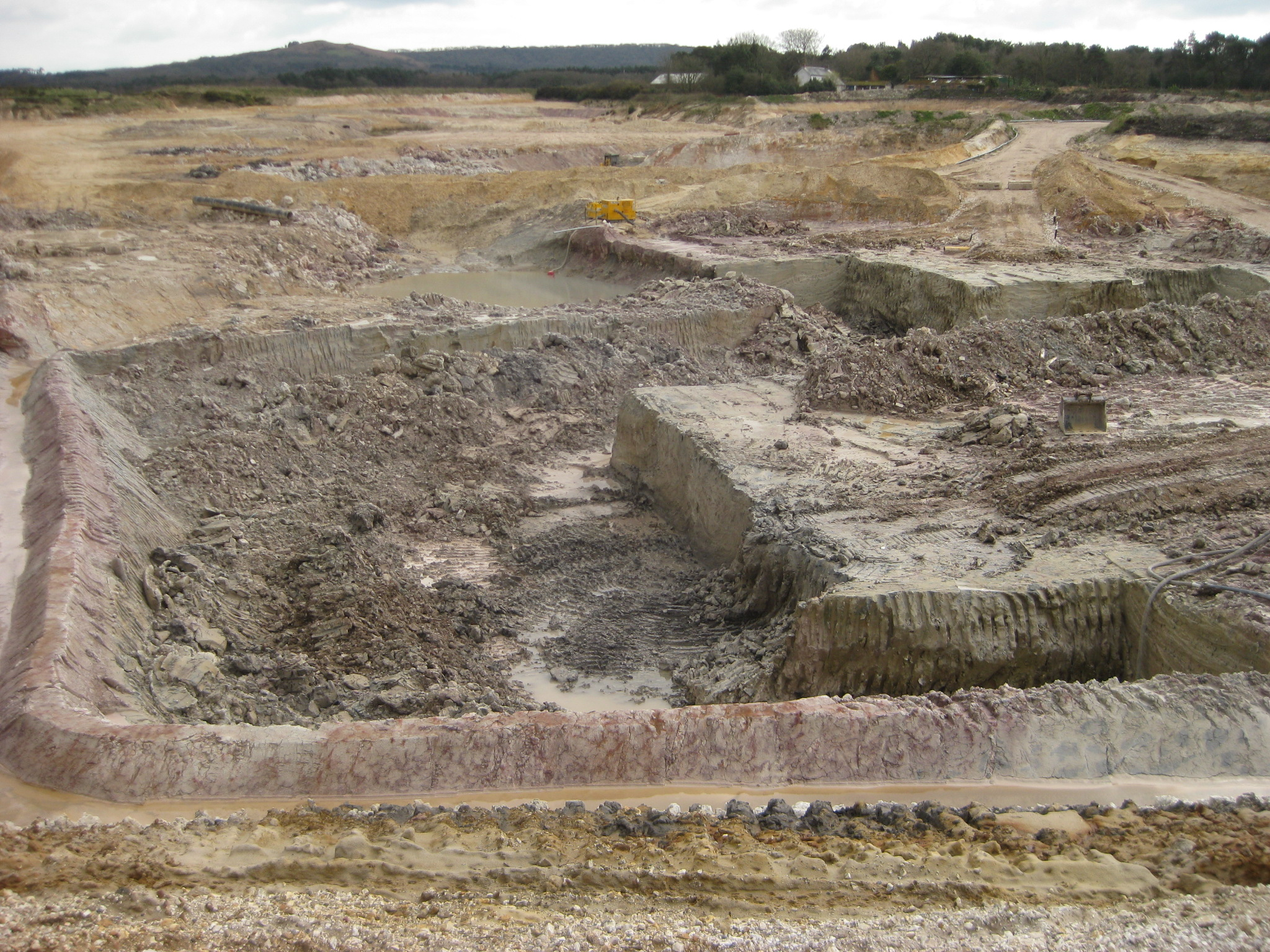
A Purbeck Ball Clay Quarry

Purbeck Ball Clay is a concentration of ball clay found on the Isle of Purbeck in the English county of Dorset.

== Geology ==
The main concentration of ball clay in Dorset is to the north of the Purbeck Hills centred on Norden. Ball clays are sedimentary in origin. Approximately 45 million years ago (in the Lutetian stage of the Eocene epoch) the climate was tropical and an ancient River Solent washed kaolinite (formed from decomposed granite) from its parent rock on Dartmoor. As the streams flowed from upland areas they mixed with other clay minerals, sands, gravels, and vegetation before settling in low-lying basins to form overlaying seams of ball clay. Ball clays usually contain three dominant minerals: from 20–80% kaolinite, 10–25% mica, and 6–65% quartz. In addition, there are other 'accessory' minerals and some carbonaceous material (derived from ancient plants) present.

== Exploitation ==
Purbeck Ball Clay has been used for thousands of years, but large scale commercial extraction began in the middle of the 18th century and continues today. The principal workings were in the area between Corfe Castle and Wareham. Originally the clay was taken by pack horse to wharves on the River Frome and the south side of Poole Harbour.

Large quantities were ordered by Josiah Wedgwood from 1771 and this led to the construction of Dorset's first railway in 1806. This was the Middlebere Plateway owned by B.Fayle & Co (Directors were Alexander Jaffray, Benjamin Fayle, Richard Jaffray, J.B. Hooper and Richard Chambers). The Plateway connected clay workings in the Corfe Castle area, to a wharf on Middlebere Creek in Poole Harbour. Other similar tramways followed, including the Furzebrook Railway (c.1840), the Newton Tramway (1854), and Fayle's Tramway (1907). With the coming of the London and South Western Railway line from Wareham to Swanage in 1885, much of the ball clay was dispatched by rail.

Approximately 80% of the ball clay extracted has been exported. The ball clay is processed today at the Furzebrook plant of Imerys. It is said that a third of all fine pottery ever produced in England contains Purbeck Ball Clay.

== Usage ==
Ball clays are used in making everyday articles including:

- wall and floor tiles, wash basins, toilet bowls, plates, cups and saucers, linoleum, acoustic ceiling tiles, insulated electrical cables, pale coloured bricks, and clay drainage pipes
- windscreen wipers, spark plugs, and engine mountings
- hoses and fertilisers
- pharmaceutical and polymers and many others
- kiln furniture

== Museum ==
The Purbeck Mineral and Mining Museum displays an exhibition about ball clays, mining and the associated narrow gauge railways.
