= River Frome, Dorset =

River in Dorset, England

River Frome
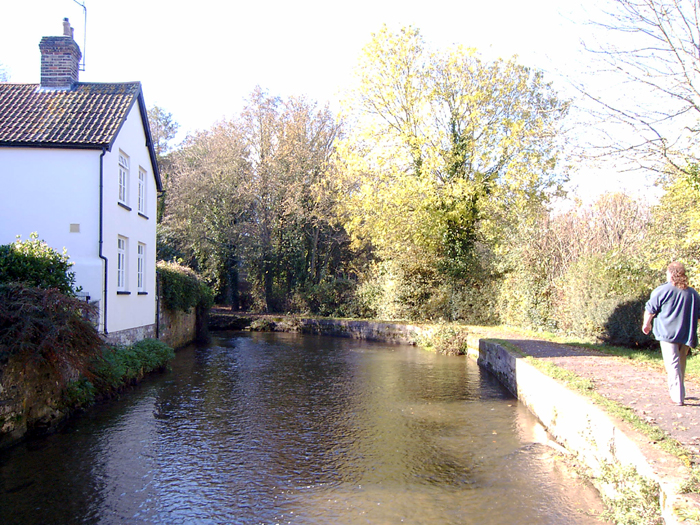
- River Frome near Dorchester

- Location within Dorset

Location
- Country: United Kingdom
- County: Dorset

Physical characteristics
- Source
  - location: Evershot, Dorset
  - coordinates: 50°50′15″N 2°36′02″W
  - elevation: 175 m (574 ft)
- Mouth
  - location: Poole, Dorset
  - coordinates: 50°41′45″N 1°59′19″W
- Length: 48 km (30 mi)
- Discharge
  - location: East Stoke
  - average: 6.38 m^{3}/s (225 cu ft/s)
  - minimum: 1.05 m^{3}/s (37 cu ft/s)26 August 1976
  - maximum: 27.9 m^{3}/s (990 cu ft/s)30 December 1993
- Discharge
  - location: Dorchester
  - average: 3.09 m^{3}/s (109 cu ft/s)

Basin features
- Tributaries
  - left: River Cerne; Sydling Water
  - right: South Winterborne; River Hooke

The River Frome /ˈfruːm/ is a river in Dorset in the south of England. At 30 miles (48 km) long it is the major chalkstream in southwest England. It is navigable upstream from Poole Harbour as far as the town of Wareham.

== Geography ==
The river rises in the Dorset Downs at Evershot, passes through Cattistock, Maiden Newton, Dorchester, West Stafford and Woodsford. At Wareham it and the parallel River Piddle flow into Poole Harbour via the Wareham Channel. The catchment area is 181 sq mi (470 km^{2}), approximately one sixth of the county.

East of Dorchester the river runs over sands, clays and gravels which overlie the chalk; as the valley gradient is gentle the Frome has deposited much sediment here and thus created a broad floodplain. Historically this contained marshes and gave the name to the Durotriges, water dwellers, the Brittonic Celtic tribe who inhabited Dorset. The river forms a wide, shallow ria at its estuary, Poole Harbour.

Prior to the end of the last ice age, the Purbeck Hills were continuous with the Isle of Wight, and the Frome would have continued eastwards through what is now Poole Harbour and Poole Bay along the Solent, collecting the Stour–Avon, Beaulieu, and Test–Itchen–Hamble catchments, before emptying into the Channel between Bembridge and Selsey Bill.

=== South Winterborne ===
The South Winterborne is a chalk stream and winterbourne. It flows through the following places from its source to the point where it joins the River Frome. The stream only flows overground during the winter, hence the name. It flows through a number of villages with a first name of "Winterborne" or “Winterbourne”:

- Winterbourne Abbas
- Winterbourne Steepleton
- Winterborne St Martin
- Winterborne Monkton
- Winterborne Herringston
- Winterborne Came

== Human history ==
At the end of the 1st century AD, the Romans built a 20 km (12 mi) aqueduct to supply public fountains and public baths at their new town of Durnovaria (Dorchester). Taking the form of a channel about 1.0 m wide and 0.35 m deep cut into the underlying chalk on an artificial terrace, lined and overlain with timber, the aqueduct took water from the Frome upstream at Nunnery Mead, near Notton (between modern-day Maiden Newton and Frampton) and closely followed the contours of the valley side to the southwest of the river. Over its course the aqueduct only fell 25 feet (7.6 m), some 60 feet (18 m) less than the river itself. It has been calculated that water would have reached Durnovaria at the rate of 8 million gallons per day. Some traces of the aqueduct terrace can still be seen at Bradford Peverell and Muckleford.

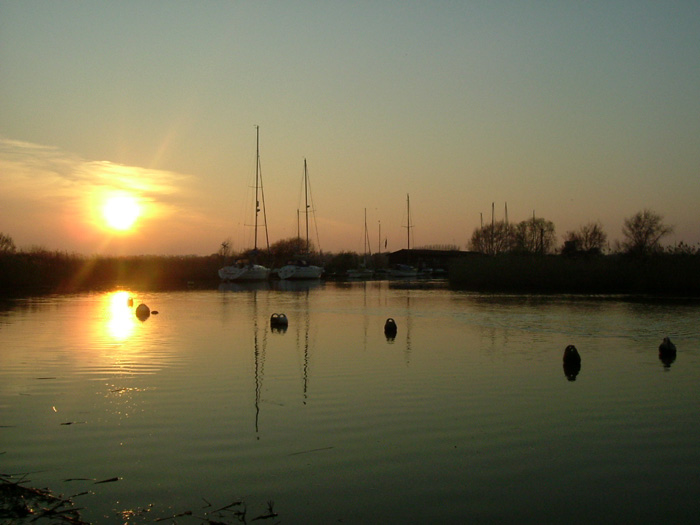
The Frome estuary at Wareham

The Danes made frequent raids up the river. The town walls at Wareham were built in 876, possibly by Alfred the Great, to defend the town against this threat.

Until the late 19th century the river was an important part of the trade route for the export of Purbeck Ball Clay from the Isle of Purbeck. Originally the clay was brought to wharves at Wareham by pack horse from the clay pits to the south. In around 1830 the Furzebrook Railway was built, connecting the pits to a wharf at Ridge. This route was eventually superseded by the use of the main line rail network, and eventually by road.

== Ecology ==
The Frome has suffered a dramatic decline in the run of salmon in recent years. In 1988 over 4000 fish ran the river; by 2004 the run had fallen to 750 fish, and in 2023 to an estimated 443. The Game & Wildlife Conservation Trust is carrying out research at its Salmon & Trout Research Centre at East Stoke into the decline of Atlantic Salmon to understand the causes and how to reverse the decline.

== River level monitoring ==
There are river level monitoring stations on the River Frome at:

- Maiden Newton
- Louds Mill
- Stinsford
- East Stoke

== See also ==
- Other Rivers Frome
- Rivers of the United Kingdom
- Geology of Dorset
