= Toller (disambiguation) =

Toller may refer to:

Places:

- Toller, a ward in the City of Bradford metropolitan district of West Yorkshire, England.
- River Toller, an old name for the River Hooke in Dorset, England
- Places in Dorset named after the river:
  - Toller Fratrum, a village and civil parish
  - Toller Porcorum, a village and civil parish
  - Toller Whelme, a hamlet
  - Toller railway station (1862–1975), a former railway station in Toller Porcorum

People:

- Toller (surname)
- Toller Cranston (1949–2015), Canadian figure skater

Other uses:

- Nova Scotia Duck Tolling Retriever, a breed of Canadian gun dog

== See also ==
- "Tollers", a nickname for author J. R. R. Tolkien
- Toler, surname
- Toler, Kentucky, U.S. unincorporated community
