= Wynford =

Wynford may refer to:

- Baron Wynford, of Wynford Eagle in the County of Dorset, is a title in the Peerage of the United Kingdom
- Thomas Wynford Rees CB, CIE, DSO & Bar, MC, DL (1898–1959), officer in the British Indian Army
- William Best, 1st Baron Wynford, PC (1767–1845), British politician and judge
- William Best, 2nd Baron Wynford (1798–1869), British peer
- William Wynford (1360–1405), one of the most successful English master masons of the 14th century, using the new Perpendicular Gothic style
- Wynford Dewhurst (born 1864), English Impressionist painter and important writer on art
- Wynford Eagle, hamlet and small parish in Dorset, England
- Wynford High School, public high school in Bucyrus, Ohio, United States
- Wynford Vaughan-Thomas CBE (1908–1987), Welsh newspaper journalist and radio and television broadcaster with a lengthy career
