= Frome Valley Trail =

16-mile footpath in south-west England

- Length: 16 miles (25km)
- Location: Dorset, South West England
- Trailheads: Evershot and Dorchester
- Use: Hiking and cycling
- Elevation change: Total ascent 300m (984ft)
- Highest point: 191 m (627 ft)
- Lowest point: 52 m (171 ft)
- Difficulty: Easy
- Season: All year
- Hazards: Flooding

The Frome Valley Trail is a long-distance footpath in Dorset, England which follows the River Frome from Evershot to Dorchester and will, when completed, extend to Poole Harbour.

== Trail description ==
The Trail runs from Evershot Village hall to Greys Bridge, Dorchester and passes through settlements of Sandhills, Chilfrome, Maiden Newton, Frome Vauchurch, Cruxton, Notton, Southover, Muckleford, Bradford Peverell, Charminster and Burton. It is currently 16 miles (25 km) long, however, It will eventually extend to Poole Harbour making Its final length 43 miles (70 km) from the source of the River Frome at Evershot to its mouth. There is also a cycle route which follows county roads and farm tracks. The trail is signed using a symbol based on an arrowhead which was designed to reflect the Bronze Age archaeological finds from the river valley. The trail is not marked on Ordnance Survey (OS) maps but the footpaths, bridleways and roads it uses are on OS Landranger 194 and OS Explorer 15 and 117 maps.

== Habitats and wildlife ==
The trail runs beside chalk streams and through areas of chalk downland, grassland, water meadows and woodland. Flora and fauna that can be seen include Kingfishers, snipe, song thrush, grey wagtail, dippers, European otters, hazel dormice, water voles, marsh marigold, water crowfoot, salmon and brown trout.

The Frome Valley is part of a major river and wetland restoration project, Dorset Wild Rivers, which is being led by Dorset Wildlife Trust and Farming & Wildlife Advisory Group South West, with funding from Wessex Water.

The trail passes two nature reserves Nunnery Mead near Frampton managed by Dorset Wildlife Trust and the Riverside Nature Reserve on the outskirts of Dorchester, managed by the Friends of the Riverside Reserve with assistance from Dorchester Town Council.

== Intersection with other long distance trails ==
The Frome Valley Trail shares its route with sections of two other long distance footpaths. It is joined by the Macmillan Way from Evershot to Sandhills and again between Chilfrome and Maiden Newton. This latter section is also shared by the Wessex Ridgeway. A very short road section at the start in Evershot is also followed by the Round Dorset Walk and the Hardy Way. When completed the trail will link up with the Purbeck Way part of which runs beside the River Frome near Wareham and the Poole Harbour Trails.

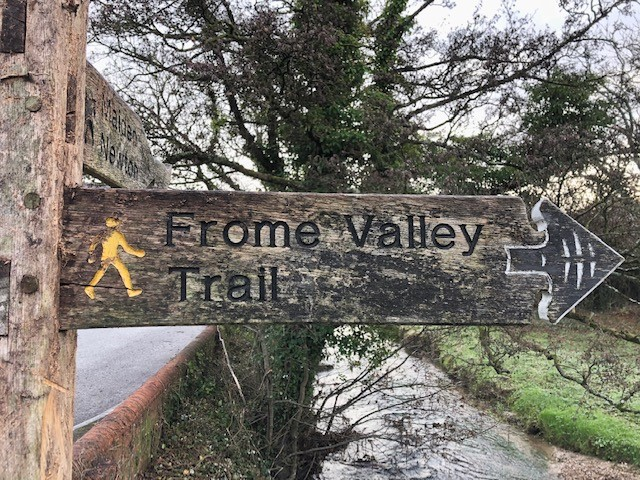
Signpost for the Frome Valley Trail in Higher Frome Vauchurch

The cycle route is joined by National Cycle Network Route 26 through Maiden Newton.

== Shorter circular routes ==
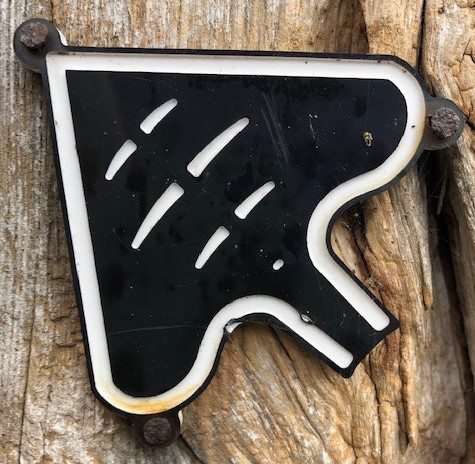
The symbol for the Frome Valley Trail

There is a short (1.5-mile [2.4 km]) circular route near Dorchester called Ratty's Trail, which is named after the character in Kenneth Grahame's book The Wind in the Willows. The trail was established in 2005 by Dorset Countryside (Dorset County Council) to encourage local people and visitors to explore the countryside and highlight the importance of the River Frome as a habitat for a wide range of wildlife, particularly the water vole.

There is also a short walk round Maiden Newton and Frome Vauchurch, which takes in points of historic interest, following part of the Frome Valley Trail through the villages. The walk starts on the corner opposite the village cross in Maiden Newton, where a sign on the wall of the village shope points the way.

The Times has published an 8.5-mile (13.7 km) circular walk in its Weekend section from Maiden Newton to Sydling St Nicholas via Cattistock. This uses the section of the Frome Valley Trail between Maiden Newton and Chilfrome.
