= William Best, 1st Baron Wynford =

British politician and judge

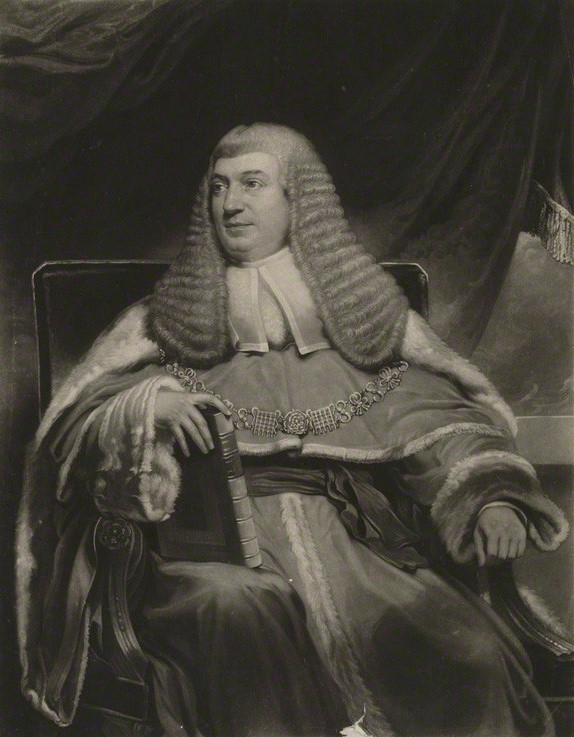
Lord Wynford.

William Draper Best, 1st Baron Wynford, PC (13 December 1767 – 3 March 1845), was a British politician and judge. He served as Chief Justice of the Common Pleas from 1824 to 1829.

== Background and education ==
Best was the third son of Thomas Best of Haselbury Plucknett in Somerset. He was educated at Crewkerne Grammar School and became a student at Wadham College, Oxford at the age of 15, but left at 17 without a degree. Originally destined for a career in the Church, he instead chose to study law, and entered the Middle Temple on 9 October 1784.

== Legal career ==
Best was Called to the Bar on 6 November 1789, and established a successful legal practice. In 1802, he was elected to parliament for Petersfield as a Whig, a seat he held until 1806. After joining the Tories, he sat for Bridport from 1812 to 1817 and then represented Guildford from 1818 to 1819.

In 1813, Best was appointed Solicitor-General to the Prince of Wales, where he remained until 1816. He was then Attorney-General to the Prince of Wales from 1816 to 1818 and Chief Justice of Chester in 1818. The following year he was made a Judge of the Common Pleas and knighted. Best was admitted to the Privy Council in 1824 and appointed Chief Justice of the Common Pleas, a position he held until 1829.

In the latter year Best was raised to the peerage of Baron Wynford, of Wynford Eagle in the County of Dorset.

Lord Wynford later served as a Deputy Speaker of the House of Lords. Despite his earlier affiliation with the Whigs, he became known as an ardent Tory, and vigorously opposed the Reform Act 1832 (2 & 3 Will. 4. c. 45). Lord Wynford suffered from gout for many years, and was carried into the House of Lords in an arm-chair, in which he was also allowed to address the rest of the house. However, he was later forced to retire from public life due to his illness.

== Family ==
In 1794, Lord Wynford married Mary Anne, daughter of Jerome Knapp Jr. of Chilton in Berkshire (now Oxfordshire), Clerk of the Haberdashers' Company, by his second wife, Sarah, daughter and eventual heiress of George Noyes of Southcote, Berkshire, and Andover, Hampshire. They lived at Wynford House at Wynford Eagle, Dorset where they raised ten children. He died in March 1845, aged 77, and was succeeded in the barony by his eldest son, William Samuel Best. Lord Wynford's daughter, Grace Anne Best, married Philip Lake Godsal, the grandfather of Philip Thomas Godsal.

== Arms ==
Coat of arms of William Best, 1st Baron Wynford
Crest Out of a Ducal Coronet Or a Demi-Ostrich rising Argent in its beak a Cross Crosslet fitchée Gold gorged with a Plain Collar and pendent therefrom a Portcullis Sable Escutcheon Sable a Cinquefoil within an Orle of Cross Crosslets Or on a Canton of the last a Portcullis of the first Supporters On either side an Eagle reguardant wings elevated standing on a Roman Fasces all proper Motto Libertas In Legibus (Liberty in the laws)

Parliament of the United Kingdom
Preceded by Sir Samuel Hood, Bt; Sir Evan Nepean, Bt	Member of Parliament for Bridport; 1808–1816; With: Sir Horace St Paul, Bt	Succeeded by Henry Charles Sturt; Sir Horace St Paul, Bt
Preceded by Thomas Cranley Onslow; Arthur Onslow	Member of Parliament for Guildford; 1818–1819; With: Arthur Onslow	Succeeded by Charles Baring Wall; Arthur Onslow
Legal offices
Preceded by The Lord Gifford	Chief Justice of the Common Pleas; 1824–1828	Succeeded by Sir Nicholas Conyngham Tindal
Peerage of the United Kingdom
New creation	Baron Wynford; 1829–1845	Succeeded by William Samuel Best
