= Warren Hill =

Warren Hill may refer to:

People:

- Warren Hill (musician) (born 1966), Canadian jazz and adult contemporary musician
- Warren Hill (murderer) (1960–2015), American murderer executed in 2015 by the state of Georgia

Places:

- HM Prison Warren Hill, prison for male juveniles in Suffolk, England
- Newmarket Warren Hill railway station, railway station in Suffolk, England
- Warren Hill, Bournemouth, important archaeological site and nature reserve on Hengistbury Head near Christchurch in Dorset, England with an elevation of 21 metres (69 ft)
- Warren Hill, Hooke, Dorset, one of Dorset's highest hills, elevation 215 metres (705 ft)
- Warren Hill, Nottinghamshire, suburban area of Arnold, Nottinghamshire, England
- Warren Hill, Powys, hill in central Wales with an elevation of 507 metres (1,663 ft)

== See also ==
- Warren Hills (disambiguation)
