= Cruxton =

Hamlet in Dorset, England

Coordinates: 50.76671°N 2.56572°W

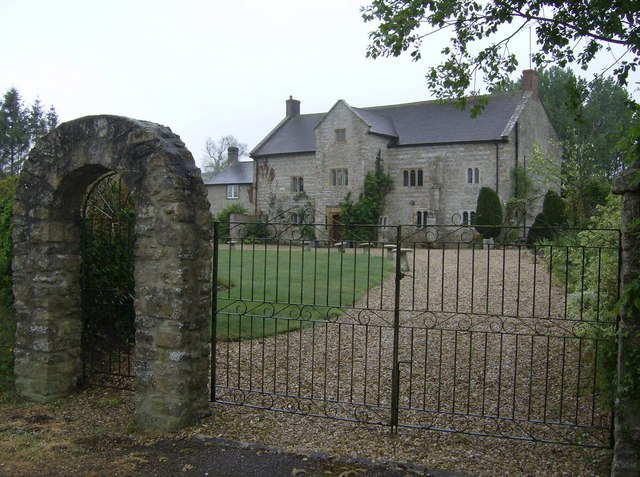
Cruxton Manor.

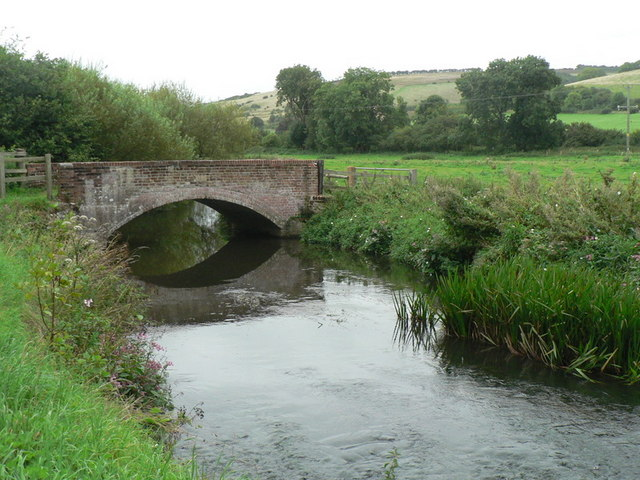
River Frome at Cruxton.

Cruxton is a hamlet in the English county of Dorset. It lies eight miles north-west of the county town of Dorchester, and one mile south-east of the village of Maiden Newton. It is sited on the west bank of the River Frome, amongst the chalk hills of the Dorset Downs.

According to the Dorset author and broadcaster Ralph Wightman, the old house in the hamlet "was certainly a manor. William Crox gave thirty marks to have seizin of the vill in 1205."

The Froome Valley Trail long-distance footpath runs through Cruxton.
