= Rampisham =

Village in Dorset, England

Coordinates: 50.8186°N 2.6238°W

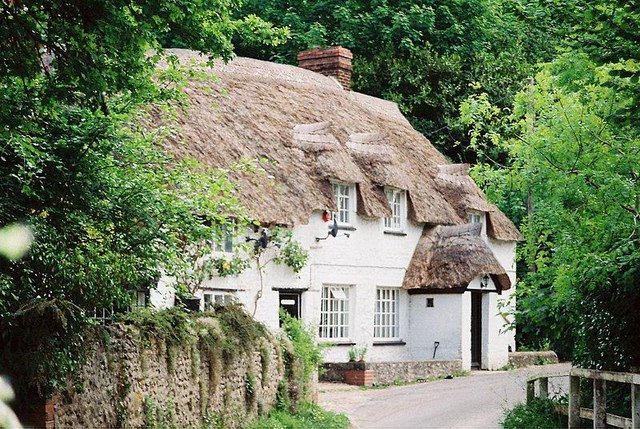
- Cottages in Rampisham village

- Location within Dorset
- Population: 110
- OS grid reference: ST562022
- Unitary authority: Dorset
- Ceremonial county: Dorset
- Region: South West
- Country: England
- Sovereign state: United Kingdom
- Post town: Dorchester
- Postcode district: DT2
- Police: Dorset
- Fire: Dorset and Wiltshire
- Ambulance: South Western
- UK Parliament: West Dorset

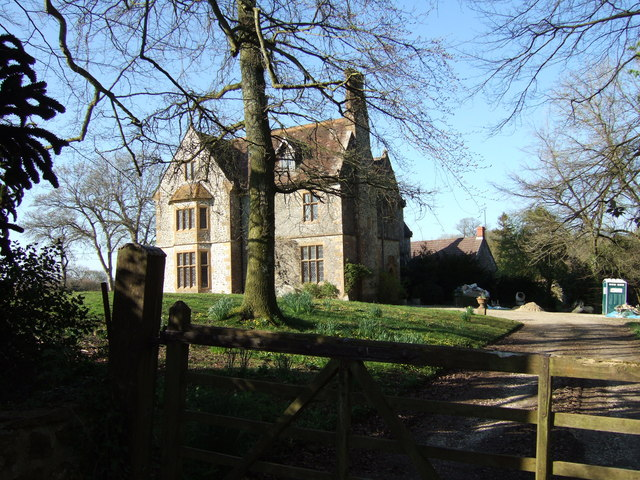
Pugin Hall, a former rectory, designed by Augustus Pugin

Rampisham (/ˈræmpɪʃəm/ or /ˈrænsəm/) is a village and civil parish in the county of Dorset in southern England, situated approximately 11 miles (18 km) northwest of the county town Dorchester. The village is sited on greensand in a valley surrounded by the chalk hills of the Dorset Downs. The parish includes the hamlet of Uphall northwest of the main village.

Dorset County Council's 2013 mid-year estimate for the population of Rampisham parish is 110. The principal means of making a living is agricultural, mainly grain production.

== History ==
In 1799 a Roman pavement was found about 1 mile (1.6 km) north-northwest of the church; it measured approximately 14 feet (4.3 m) by 10 feet (3.0 m) and was well preserved, having a pattern of concentric rings and a floral decoration, but it was destroyed by treasure-hunters.

In the Domesday Book in 1086 Rampisham was recorded as Ramesham. It was in the hundred of Tollerford, had seventeen households and the tenant-in-chief was Bishop Odo of Bayeaux.

Rampisham's parish church, dedicated to St Michael and All Saints, has a medieval south tower which was built in phases in the early 14th (1326) and 15th centuries. The rest of the building was largely rebuilt in two bouts of Victorian restoration: first in 1845–7 and then in 1858–60. Augustus Pugin was involved in the first restoration, designing a new east window and chancel. He also built a a rectory for the village, though this is now a private house. The second restoration involved an extension to the tower and a rebuilding of the nave; this was undertaken by John Hicks, possibly with assistance from a young Thomas Hardy.

A quarter of a mile north-northeast of the church is the base and part of the shaft of a 15th-century wayside cross.

== Geography ==
Rampisham village is sited on greensand at an altitude of 125 to 145 metres (410 to 476 ft) in a tributary valley of the River Frome. It is surrounded by the chalk hills of the Dorset Downs, which rise to 224 metres (735 ft) at West Hill to the north. Measured directly, the village is 8 miles (13 km) northeast of Bridport, 11 miles (18 km) northwest of Dorchester and 8.5 miles (13.7 km) south of Yeovil in Somerset.

== Communications station ==
In November 1939 the BBC acquired 189 acres (76 ha) of land on Rampisham Down, a hill southwest of the village. It became the location of one of the main transmitters of the BBC World Service in Europe until it was shut in 2011. There were 26 transmitter pylons on the down.

It is now the home for a small business park, with 2 pylons left on site, one used as a home for nesting Peregrine Falcons.
