= Rampisham Down =

Hill in Dorset, England

Coordinates: 50.81035°N 2.64857°W

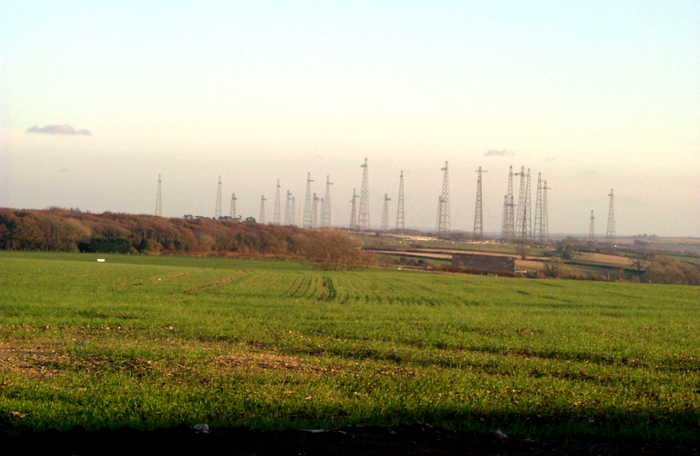
- Rampisham Down from the north

Highest point
- Elevation: 221 m (725 ft)
- Prominence: 5 m (16 ft)

Geography
- Location: Dorset Downs, England
- OS grid: ST544014
- Topo map: OS Landranger 194

Rampisham Down is a chalk hill in the Dorset Downs, eight miles north west of Dorchester in west Dorset, England. The highest part of the hill is 221 metres (720 feet). To the north east of the hill is the Frome valley and the village of Rampisham, to the south west is the Hooke valley and the village of Hooke. The A356 road between Dorchester and Crewkerne cuts across the down.

== Communications station ==
Rampisham Down was the location of one of the main transmitters of the BBC World Service in Europe until it was shut in 2011. There were 26 transmitter pylons on the down.

The 189-acre site was acquired by the BBC in November 1939 and the station, known as Overseas Extension 3 (OSE3), was equipped with four Marconi type SWB 18, 100 kW short-wave transmitters. The transmitter halls, each containing a pair of these transmitters, were separated by heavy blast walls. A comprehensive aerial system was installed consisting of 29 arrays supported between 15 masts of heights varying between 100 ft and 325 ft. Full world coverage was given by this aerial system, although the transmissions were primarily intended for areas outside Europe. This was the first of the BBC's short-wave stations to be provided with 4-wire transmission lines, following tests made at Daventry (OSE1). A remotely controlled switching tower was used for connecting any transmitter to any aerial array (antenna).

OSE3 was provided with an emergency power supply consisting of two 750-bhp diesel alternator sets. The diesel engines, which had been designed for railway locomotives abroad, were equipped with battery starting facilities instead of the compressed-air starting arrangements that were conventional for diesel engines of this size. The station came into service on 16 February 1941 and during May of that year a number of tests were carried out using a captive balloon to measure the performance of the horizontal dipole arrays and to determine the effect of the contour of the ground close to the station on their vertical radiation pattern.

During those first years the site was subject to attempts at destruction by the German Luftwaffe. Mr E.A. Beaumont, who was part of the original installation team writes: 'I have vivid recollections of my colleagues during these years when we completed the installation and putting into service of the station to the accompaniment of the Luftwaffe's efforts to put southern England out of action and I can still recall the line of craters left on the north side of the road opposite the station by a stick of bombs deposited by a German bomber one night and the cannon shells which penetrated the diesel generator building on another occasion. Aerial dog fights between large formations of German bombers and our defending fighters became a daily occurrence‘.

The original transmitters remained in service until 1963 when they were replaced by 250 kW transmitters built by Marconi along with two twin-channel 100 kW units. About three years later the first of the BBC's relay stations overseas was built on Ascension Island and in order to provide a programme feed to the island two 60 kW Single Side Band transmitters were installed at Rampisham. This method of sending programme feeds to the relay stations continued until satellite feeds became available.

In 1982 Rampisham went through the biggest re-engineering since it began. The site was completely stripped of the old antennas and the building gutted to a shell in preparation for a complete new installation. Ten 500 kW transmitters and 34 wideband curtain arrays were installed. The majority of antennas point in an Easterly direction with others capable of beaming to the West. A fully automatic control system was also installed that continually monitored the broadcasts and the site.

In 2010 the station was operated by Babcock International Group as part of the takeover of VT Group (formerly VT Communications and Merlin Communications following the privatisation of BBC Transmission Services in 1997).

Following extensive budget cuts by the BBC World Service, due to the ceasing of funding by the Foreign & Commonwealth Office, the site was earmarked for closure in Summer 2011. The final broadcast from the site took place on Saturday 29 October 2011. Sender 48 was the final transmitter on-air, broadcasting Deutsche Welle's German service to Europe on 6075 kHz between 21:00 and 21:59. This was the final Deutsche Welle broadcast to Europe. The final BBC transmissions were in Arabic between 20:00 and 21:00 on 5790 kHz and 11680 kHz to North Africa.

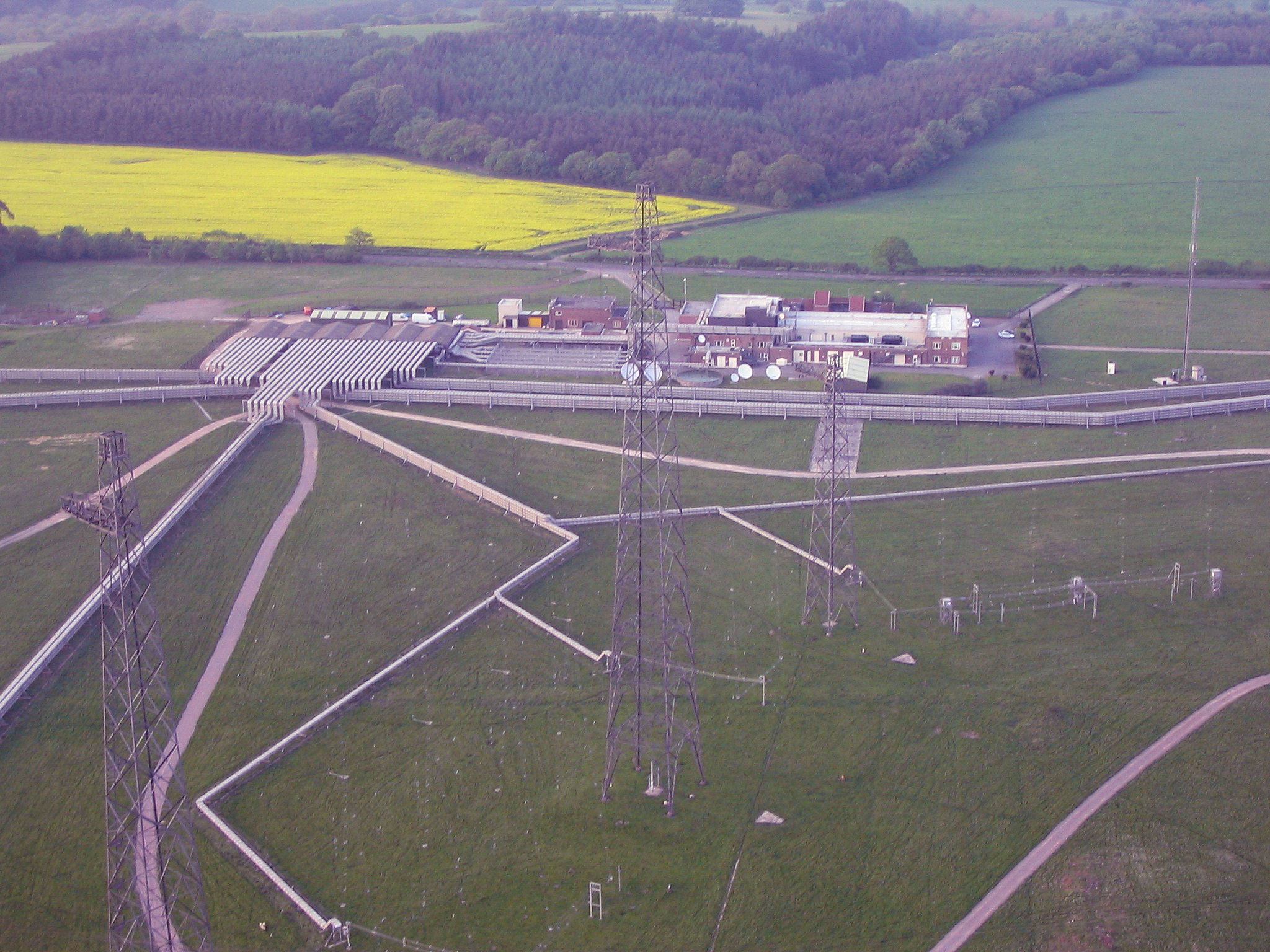
View of the Buildings

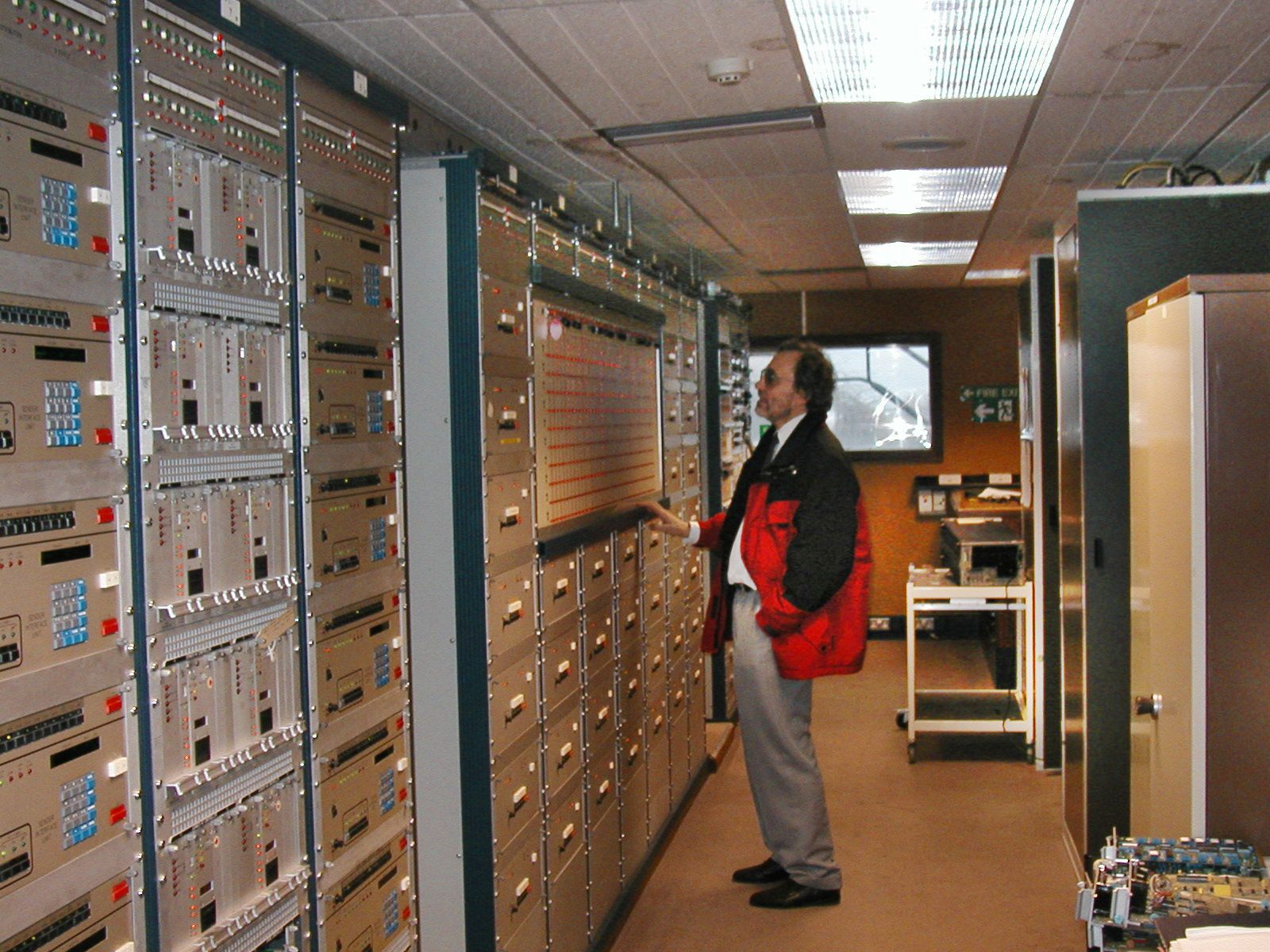
Apparatus Room

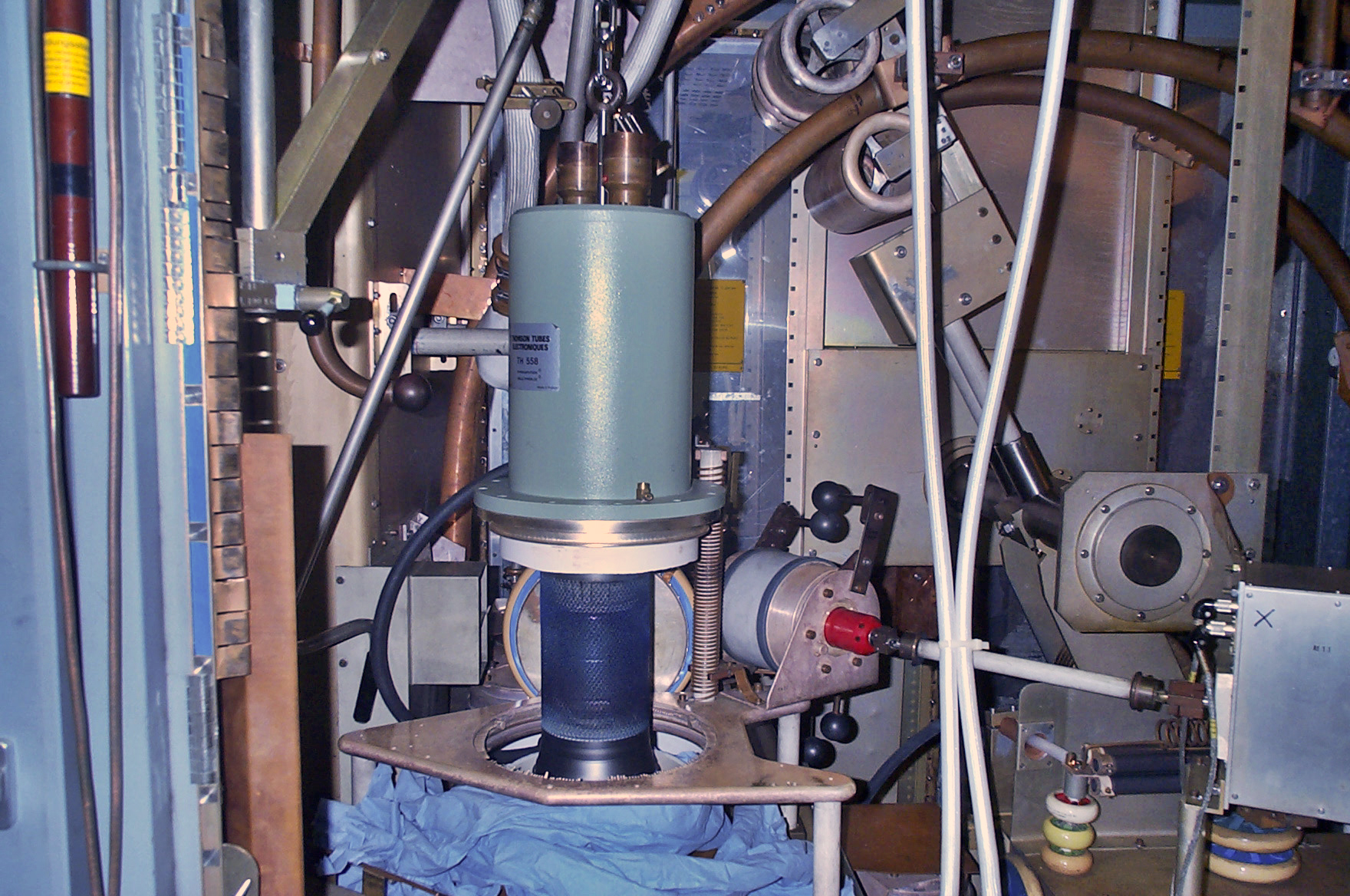
Valve in AEG S4005 Transmitter

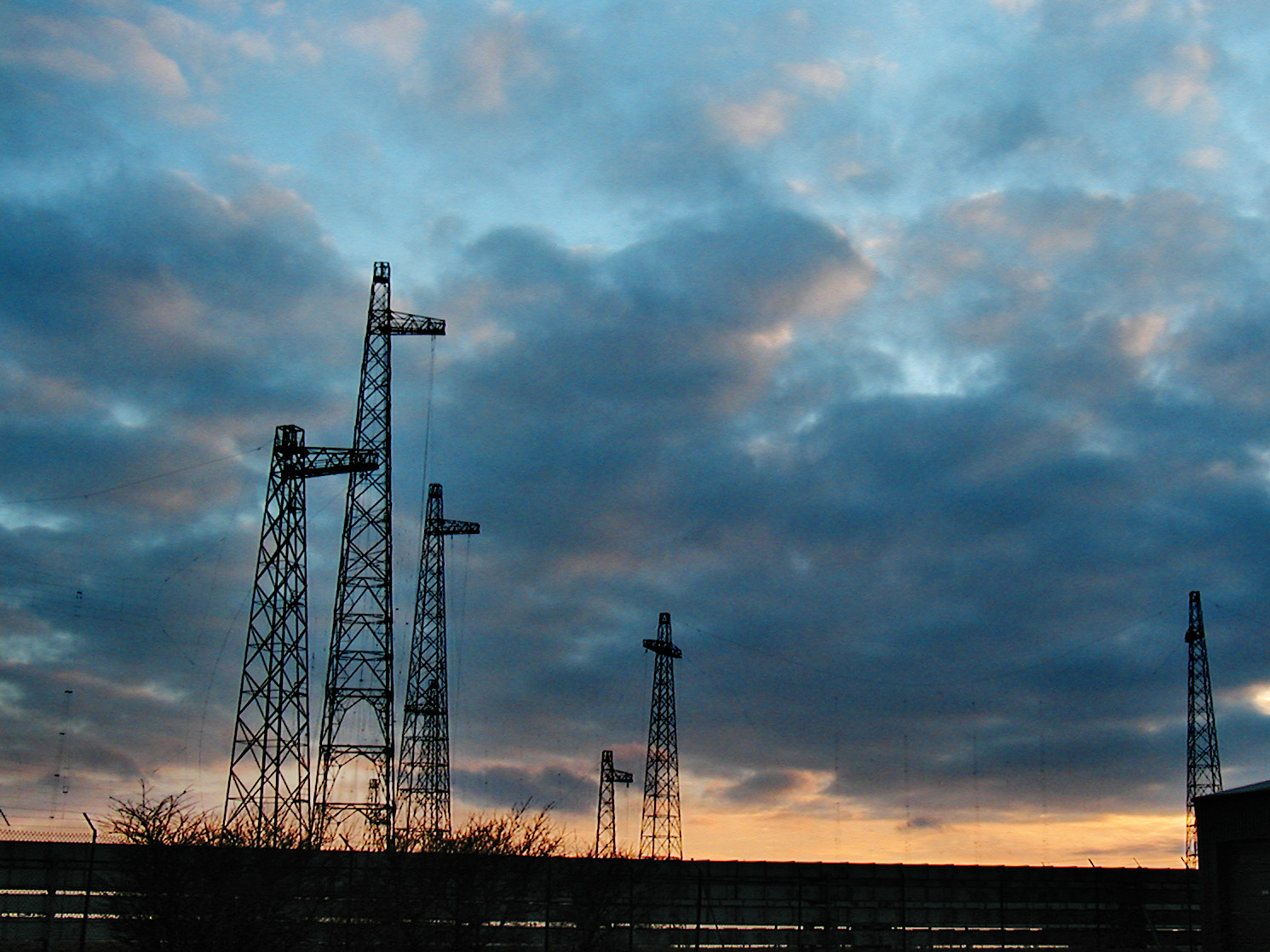
Antenna Field 1

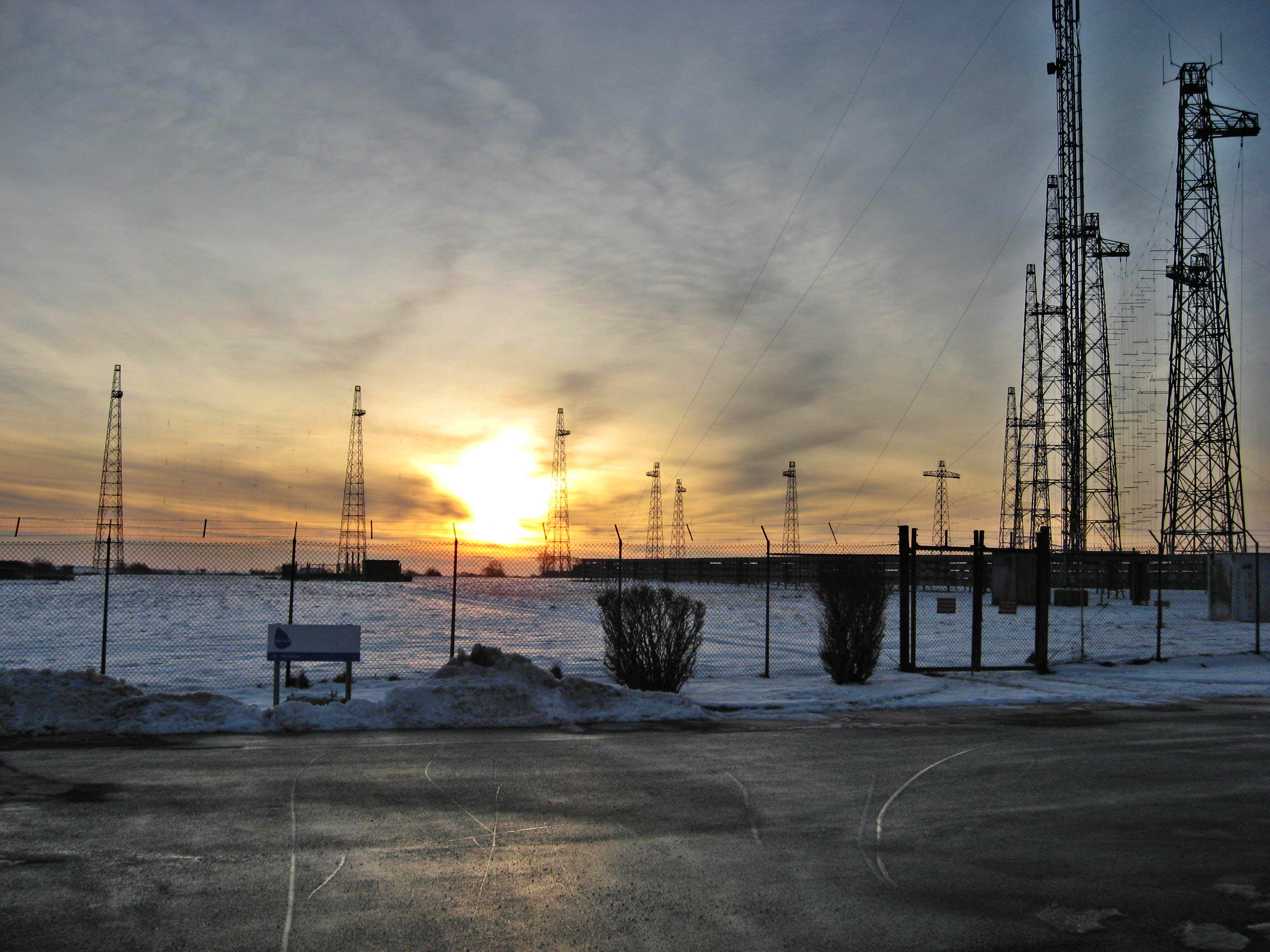
Antenna Field 2

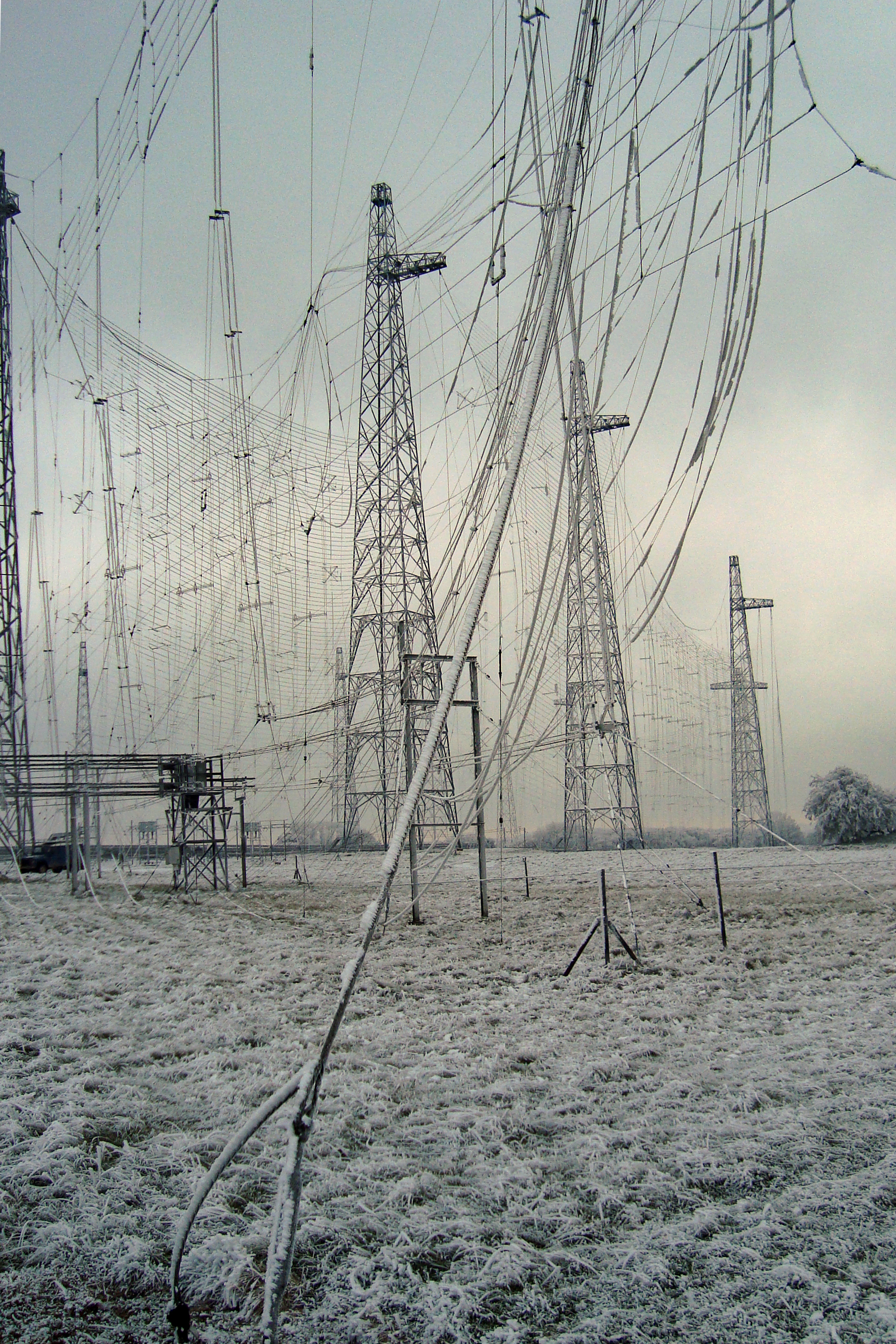
Antenna Field 3

== Site of Special Scientific Interest ==
In August 2013 Rampisham Down was notified as a Site of Special Scientific Interest (SSSI) by Natural England, in recognition of a very large area of lowland acid grassland occurring on the whole site, together with areas of lowland heath habitat. These have hardly been disturbed since the communications station was installed. The acid grassland is largely agriculturally unimproved and forms the largest area of this habitat in the county of Dorset. Such a site of over 70 hectares (170 acres) is rare in lowland England, and the mosaic of acid grassland and lowland heath habitats is of national significance.

== Proposed solar farm ==
On 15 January 2015 West Dorset District Council approved a planning application by British Solar Renewables to build a solar farm on 40 hectares (99 acres) of the site of the former transmitting station, subject to conditions and for a period of 25 years. The facility will generate 24 megawatts. The rest of the site is to remain as grassland. The scheme is opposed by a number of organisations including Dorset Wildlife Trust.

On 2 February 2015 the Government instructed West Dorset District Council to stop any further progress with the development, while the Department of Communities and Local Government considered whether to call in the application to be decided at a public inquiry.

On 30 June 2015 the Government announced it had called in the planning permission for the development, to be determined by a planning inspector at a public inquiry.

British Solar Renewables asked for the public inquiry, set to take place in September 2016, to be put "on hold", pending an application to develop an adjacent site that is less controversial. On the 22 December 2016 planning permission was granted for this smaller site. In addition, plans for the main site will be dropped and existing infrastructure on the SSSI will be removed.
