= William Best, 2nd Baron Wynford =

British Baron and politician

William Samuel Best, 2nd Baron Wynford (19 February 1798 – 28 February 1869), was a British peer.

== Background ==
Wynford was the son of William Best, 1st Baron Wynford, Chief Justice of the Common Pleas and his wife, Mary Anne, daughter of Jerome Knapp Jr. of Chilton in Berkshire (now Oxfordshire), Clerk of the Haberdashers' Company, by his second wife, Sarah, daughter and eventual heiress of George Noyes of Southcote, Berkshire & Andover.

He married Jane, the daughter of William Thoyts of Sulhamstead House in Berkshire and his wife, Jane, the daughter & co-heiress of Abram Newman of Mount Bures, Essex, the famous London tea merchant. They lived together at Wynford House in Wynford Eagle, Dorset. Wynford had a London home at 5 Upper Brook Street, Mayfair.

== Political career ==
Wynford sat as Member of Parliament for Mitchell (also known as St Michael's) between 1831 and 1832, when the constituency was disenfranchised through the Great Reform Act. He succeeded his father in the barony in 1845.

== Personal life ==
Lord Wynford died in February 1869, aged 71, at 7 Park Place, St James', Middlesex, and was succeeded in the barony by his eldest son, William Draper Mortimer Best, 3rd Baron Wynford.

Parliament of the United Kingdom
Preceded by Hon. Lloyd Kenyon; John Heywood Hawkins	Member of Parliament for Mitchell; 1831–1832; With: Hon. Lloyd Kenyon	Constituency abolished
Peerage of the United Kingdom
Preceded by William Draper Best	Baron Wynford; 1845–1869	Succeeded by William Draper Mortimer Best
