= Pugin Hall =

Grade I listed building in Dorset, England

Coordinates: 50.8215°N 2.6277°W

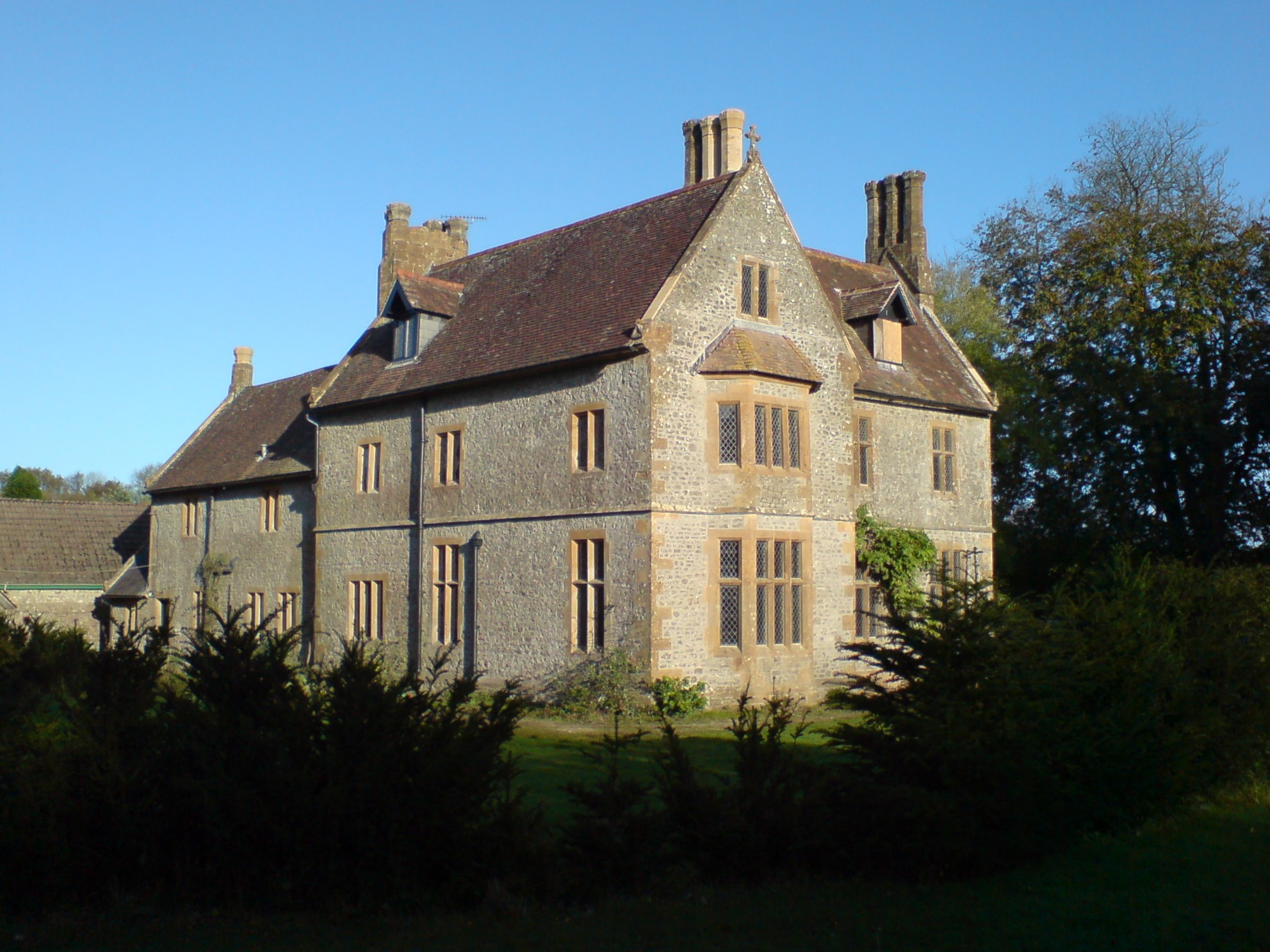
Pugin Hall

Pugin Hall is a private house, designed as a rectory by Augustus Pugin and built in 1846–1847 in Rampisham, Dorset, England. The house is a Grade I listed building, the top category, 'of highest significance'.

== Early history ==
Pugin Hall was built in 1846–1847 as a replacement for the earlier rectory at Rampisham, Parsonage House, which was considered to be too dilapidated to be suitable for repair. It was one of two Church of England rectories built by Pugin, a Catholic convert.

=== Historic England listing details ===
Pugin Hall was a major commission by one of the most distinguished architects of the Victorian era, A.W.N. Pugin. It is a characteristic and highly influential example of one of Pugin's smaller, professional middle-class houses and is considered to be the most complete example of domestic architecture designed by him. It has an exceptionally well-preserved interior with features of high quality and is almost complete in every detail....(it) is unique as being his only commission for which a full set of detailed plans and specifications survive, produced by Pugin himself. The survival of such an unaltered house by Pugin is very rare and there is clearly no doubt at all about its exceptional importance.

== Later history ==
There were several families privately owning Pugin Hall over the years, including the Armstrong-Wilson family in 1986.

The house was listed for sale in 2013 at a guide price of £1.7 million.

== Gallery ==
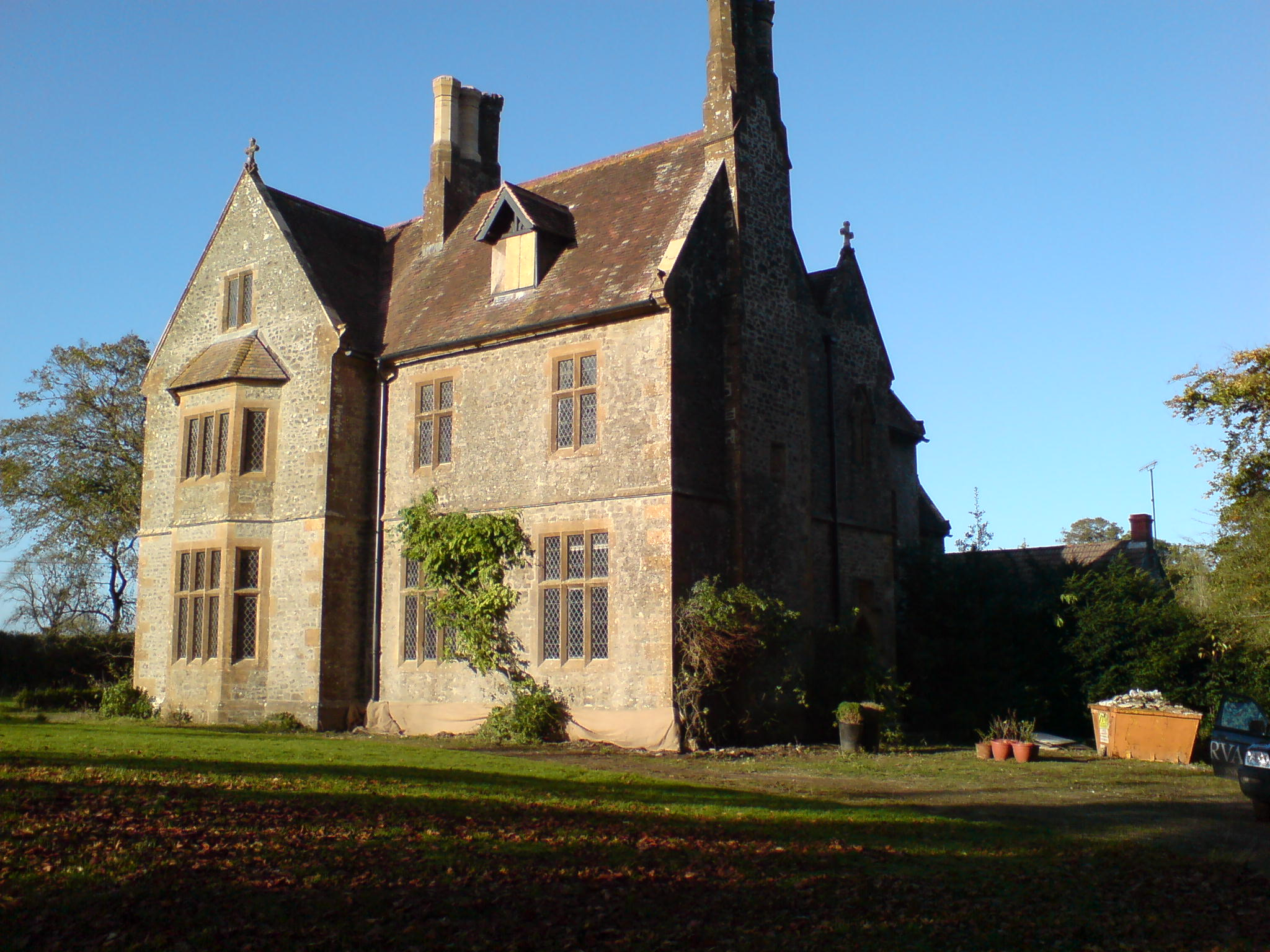
Pugin Hall, Rampisham, Dorset.

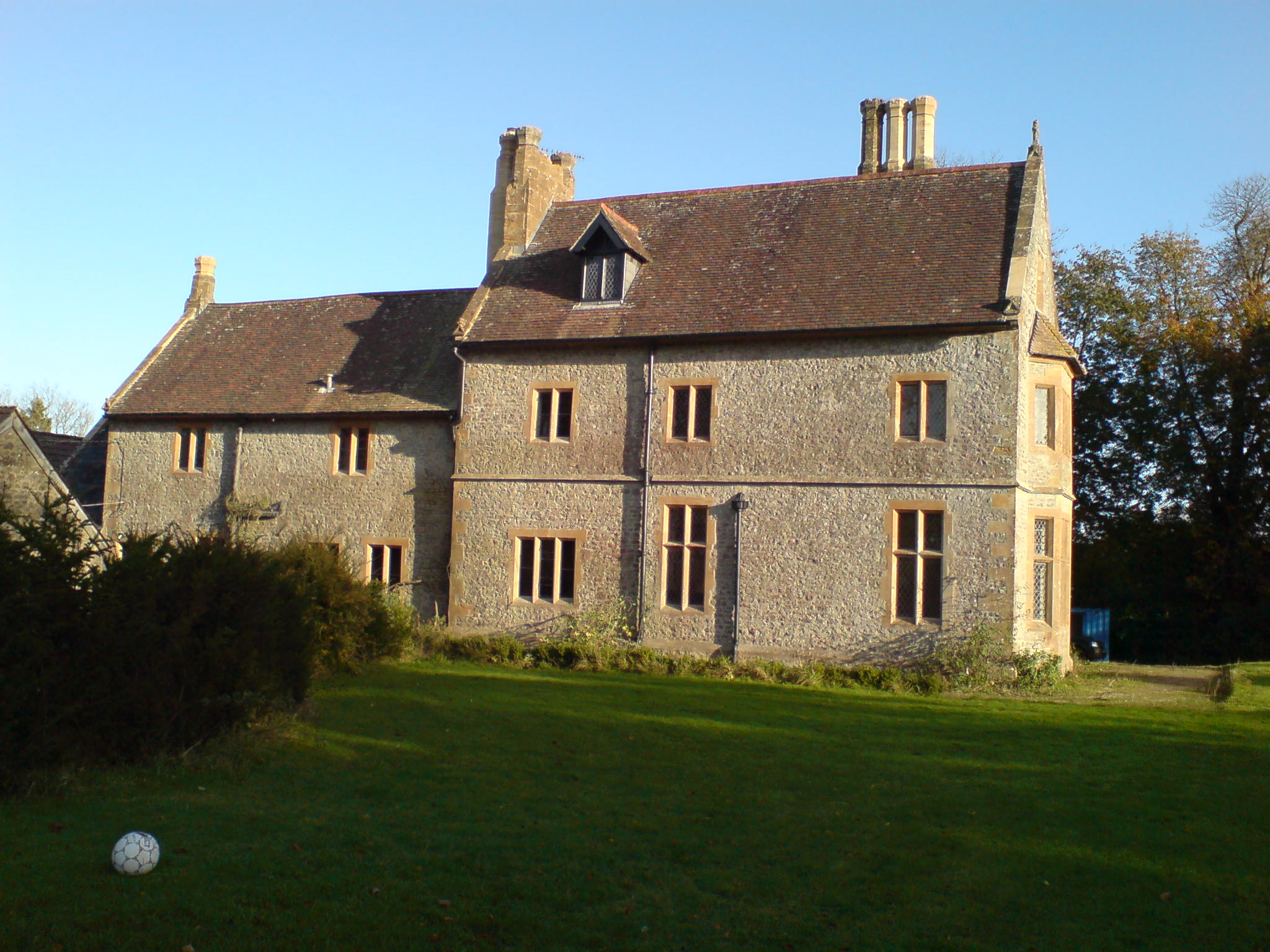
Pugin Hall, Rampisham, Dorset.

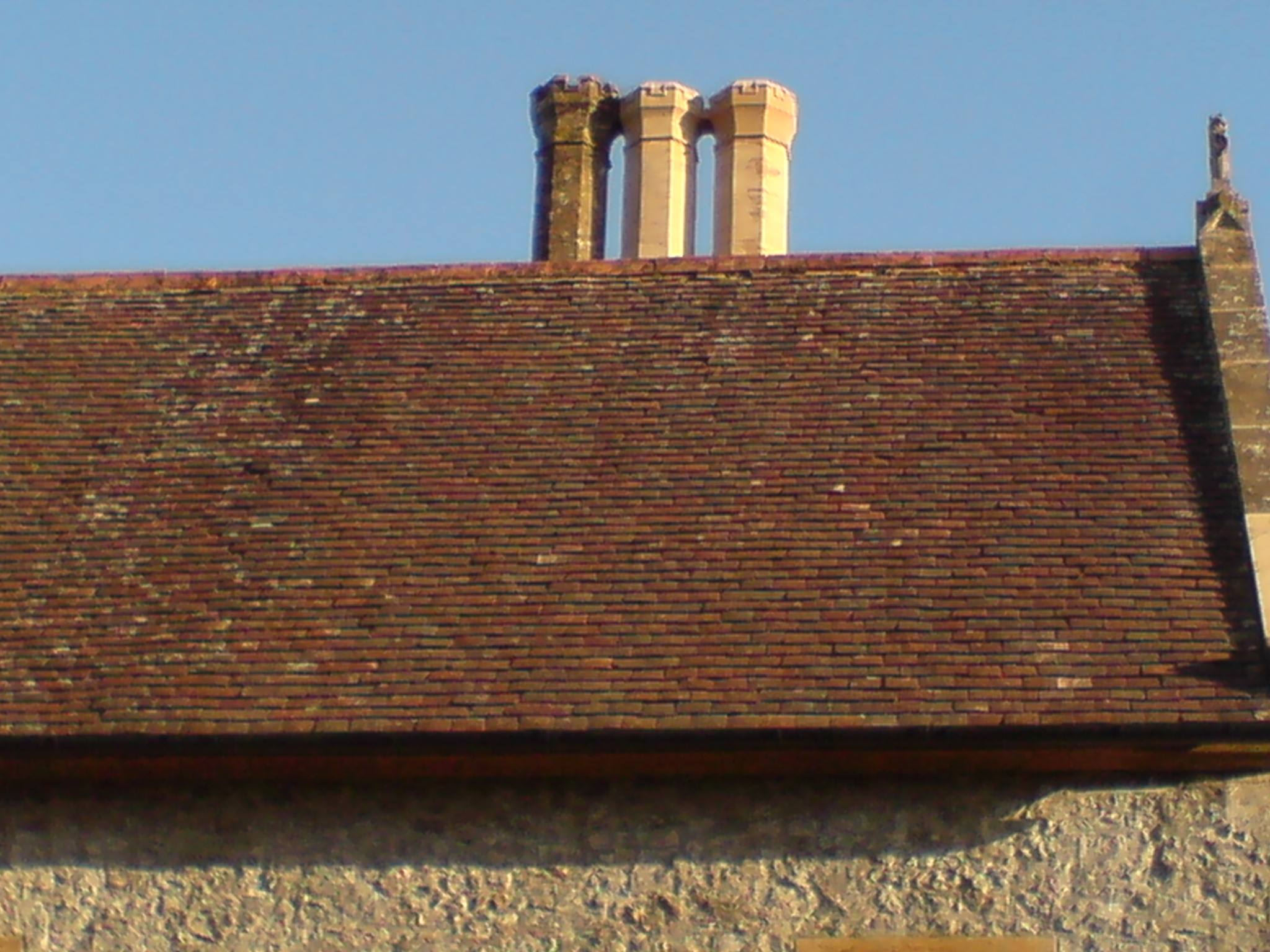
Pugin Hall, Rampisham, Dorset. Detail of chimney stacks
