= Warren Hills =

Warren Hills may refer to:

- Warren Hills AVA, an American Viticultural Area in Warren County, New Jersey
- Warren Hills Regional School District, in Warren County, New Jersey
  - Warren Hills Regional High School

== See also ==
- Warren Hill (disambiguation)
