= Hardy Way =

220-mile footpath in southern England

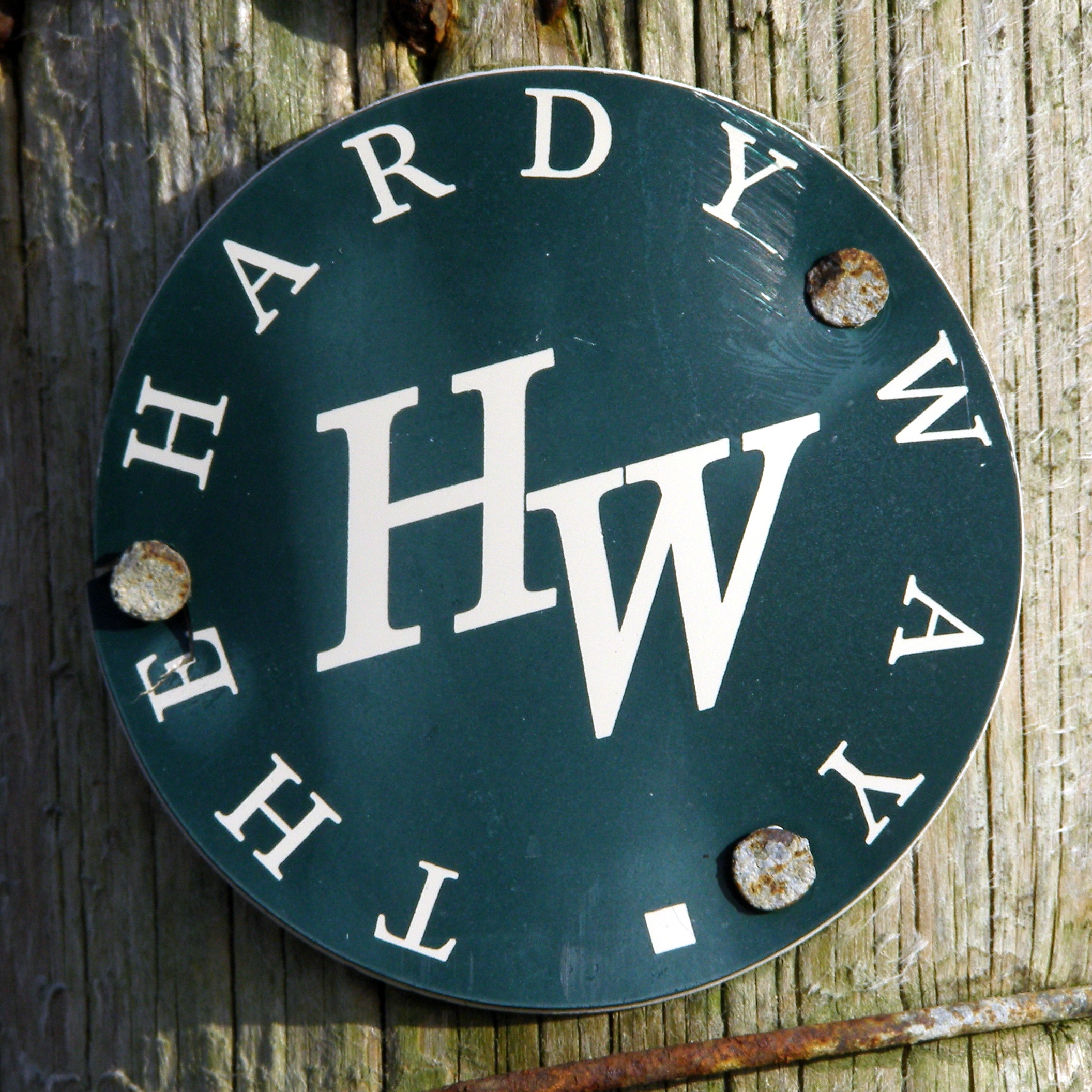
Waymark on the Hardy Way

The Hardy Way is a waymarked long-distance footpath in southern England.

== Length of the Hardy Way ==
The route runs for 354 km or 220 miles.

== The route ==
The route is named for the writer Thomas Hardy and runs through Thomas Hardy's Wessex, his version of Wessex, the region of the West Country of England portrayed in his books, such as Tess of the d'Urbervilles, The Mayor of Casterbridge, Far From the Madding Crowd, Jude the Obscure and others.

It starts at Higher Bockhampton, where Hardy was born, and finishes at Stinsford churchyard, where Hardy's heart lies buried.

It passes through Dorset and takes in along the route such villages and towns as Bere Regis, Lulworth Cove, Corfe Castle, Shaftesbury, Evershot and the county town, Dorchester.
