= Toller (surname) =

Toller is a surname, and may refer to:

- Ernst Toller (1893–1939), German author and revolutionary
- Karen Toller (1662–1742), Norwegian estate owner and ship owner, granddaughter of Niels Toller
- Montagu Toller (1871–1948), English solicitor and cricketer
- Niels Toller (1592–1642), Danish merchant
- Paula Toller (born 1962), Brazilian singer-songwriter
- Samuel Toller (1764–1821), English lawyer in India and legal writer
- Thomas Northcote Toller (1844–1930), British academic and lexicographer

== See also ==
- Toler
