= Wynford Eagle =

Hamlet and civil parish in Dorset, England

Coordinates: 50.761°N 2.595°W

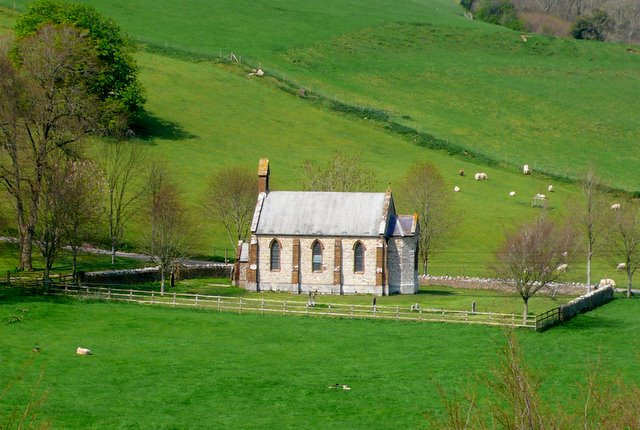
- Church of St Lawrence, Wynford Eagle

- Location within Dorset
- Population: 193
- OS grid reference: SY581959
- Unitary authority: Dorset
- Ceremonial county: Dorset
- Region: South West
- Country: England
- Sovereign state: United Kingdom
- Post town: Dorchester
- Postcode district: DT2
- Dialling code: 01305
- Police: Dorset
- Fire: Dorset and Wiltshire
- Ambulance: South Western
- UK Parliament: West Dorset

Wynford Eagle is a hamlet and small parish in Dorset, England, situated approximately 1.5 miles (2.4 km) southwest of Maiden Newton and 7.5 miles (12.1 km) northwest of Dorchester. In the 2021 Census the parish population was recorded as 193.

== Toponymy ==
The village was recorded as Wenfrot in the Domesday Book of 1086, and as Wynfrod Egle in 1288. The name Wynford derives from the Celtic wïnn and frud, meaning a white or bright stream. The affix Eagle derives from the 13th-century manorial L'Aigle family (de Aquila, del Egle).

== History ==
Wynford Eagle parish contains barrows. Roman remains have also been unearthed here, including mosaic pavements, which have led to its identification as a villa site. The parish used to be in the hundred of Tollerford.

In 1788 the village is mentioned in Owen's New Book of Fairs as having a yearly fair on 21 August, selling toys.

=== Manor house ===
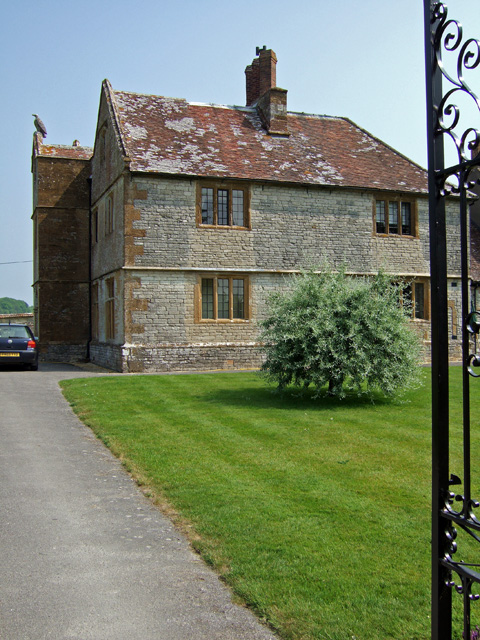
Manor Farmhouse, home of Thomas Sydenham (1624–1689)

The manor house, now Manor Farm, rebuilt in 1630, was from 1551 for many years the seat of the Puritan Sydenham family, to which belonged the distinguished physician Thomas Sydenham (1624–1689). The family lost the property in scandalous circumstances, the last Sydenham owner dying in Dorchester prison in 1709. The property is Grade II* listed.

The estate was later acquired by the Best family, originally of Somerset, for whom the title of Baron Wynford was created in 1829. The same family remain the principal landowners.

== Church ==
The church of Saint Lawrence, formerly a chapelry of the church of Toller Fratrum, and later annexed to it as a perpetual curacy, was rebuilt in 1842 but preserves a striking Norman tympanum, carved with two wyverns, probably intended to represent eagles, as a pun on the name of Matilda de l'Aigle, who presumably commissioned it, according to one of the two inscriptions; the other names the sculptor, Alvy or Alvi.

Today, the church is little used. At Christmas there is a small service.
