= Warren Hill, Hooke, Dorset =

Hill in Dorset, England

Warren Hill
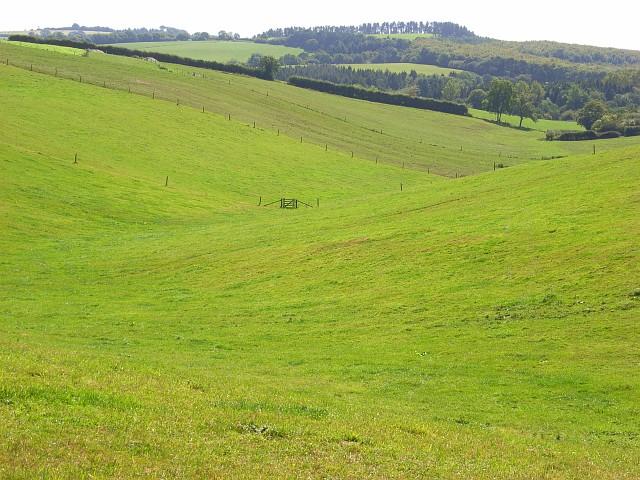
- Burnt Bottom with Warren Hill and the woodland of Hooke Park in the background.

Highest point
- Elevation: 215 m (705 ft)
- Prominence: 51 m (167 ft)
- Parent peak: Lewesdon Hill
- Listing: Tump
- Coordinates: 50°47′34″N 2°40′25″W

Geography
- Location: Dorset, England
- Parent range: Dorset Downs
- OS grid: SY526994
- Topo map: OS Landranger 194

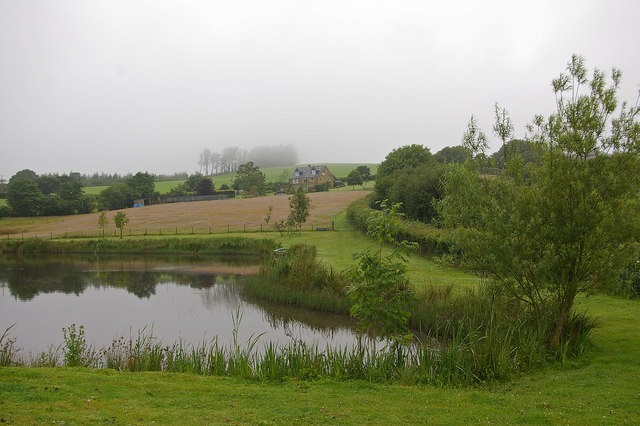
Lake at Knight's in the Bottom with Warren Hill beyond

Warren Hill is a prominent elevation, 215 metres (705 ft) high, 1 kilometre southwest of the hamlet of Hooke, in the county of Dorset in southern England. Its prominence of 51 metres (167 ft) means it is listed as one of the Tumps. It is located within the Dorset Downs.

The summit is open, as is the hill's eastern flank, but much of the western side of the hill is covered by the woods of Hooke Park. Hooke Court lies just to the northeast. The Jubilee Trail passes Warren Hill just to the south and the Wessex Ridgeway just to the north.
