= St Francis' Church, Frome Vauchurch =

Church in Dorset, England

St Francis' Church
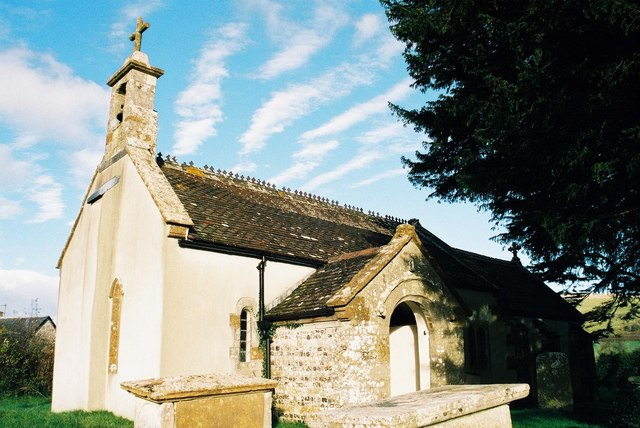

Religion
- Affiliation: Church of England
- Ecclesiastical or organizational status: Active

Location
- Location: Frome Vauchurch, Dorset, England
- Interactive map of St Francis' Church
- Coordinates: 50.7730°N 2.5693°W

Architecture
- Type: Church
- Style: Early English

St Francis' Church is a Church of England church in Frome Vauchurch, Dorset, England. It has 12th-century origins, with a major rebuild in the 17th-century and restoration work in the 19th century. The church is a Grade II* listed building.

== History ==
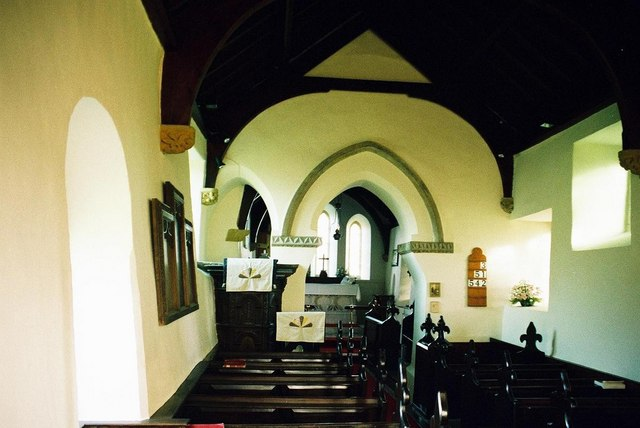
The interior of St Francis' Church.

The core of St Francis' has been dated to the 12th century, with an extensive rebuild carried out during the 17th century. The south porch was added in the 16th or 17th-century.

In 1879, the church underwent repair, which included adding a new roof with open timbers, and it was also reseated with new benches. In 1937, some of the benches were discovered to be suffering from severe dry rot. Work was quickly carried out to remedy the issue and the resulting debt was cleared in 1938.

The church's dedication was originally unknown, but in 1988 it was dedicated to St Francis. A vestry was built on the north side of the chancel in the early 21st century.

== Architecture ==
St Francis' is built of local rubble stone and flint, with freestone dressings and roofs covered with clay tiles. The church is made up of a nave, chancel, north vestry and south porch. On the west gable is a bell-cot of 17th-century date, containing one bell and surmounted by a stone cross. There are buttresses on all sides of the church except east. The exterior of the church has been rendered except for the nave's north wall and the porch.

The internal walls are largely rendered, with some ashlar detailing. The roofs have arch-braced collars on carved stone corbels, and the chancel's purlins use diagonal bracing. The chancel arch has 12th-century origins but with later modifications including the rebuilding of the arch and the addition of an opening on the north side leading to the pulpit, probably carried out in the 17th century. The chancel's south wall has a 12th-century piscina in a 19th-century recess, and the sanctuary has paving using 19th-century encaustic tiles.

The nave's north wall has a 17th-century round-headed two-light window and a late 12th-century doorway, now partially blocked and with a 19th-century window fitted in the upper part. The south wall's easternmost segmental-headed two-light window and the adjacent elliptical-headed single light window are both of 17th-century date, and the westernmost round-headed single light window is 12th-century. The south doorway is of 16th or 17th-century date. The west wall has two 19th-century single light windows. The three windows of the chancel's east wall are 19th-century. The north side has a round-headed single light window believed to be 12th-century. The south side has two windows; the west lancet being of 13th-century date, and the east round-headed single light of 12th-century origin but widened in the 17th century.

The late 12th-century font has a square bowl, cylindrical stem and moulded base, and the oak pulpit, which sits on a stone base, is early 17th-century. The church retains its 19th-century seating. The communion table is of French stone. The church's bell is dated 1631 and was cast by one of the Purdues.

== Churchyard ==
The churchyard was extended in 1886 when a plot of adjoining ground to the south was gifted by Mr. R. B. Sheridan. He also directed the laying out of the new ground, including the planting of shrubs and the installation of a sundial. The extension was made in memory of Sheridan's wife, Marcia Maria, who died at Frampton in 1884. The ground was consecrated by the Bishop of Salisbury, the Right Rev. John Wordsworth, on 21 September 1891.

The churchyard contains four table tombs that are now Grade II listed monuments:

- William Goare, died April 1660
- Table tomb with illegible inscription, late 17th-century
- Table tomb with illegible inscription, late 18th-century
- Edward Porter, died 7 July 1801
