= Hooke, Dorset =

Village and civil parish in Dorset, England

Coordinates: 50.7988°N 2.6604°W

Hooke
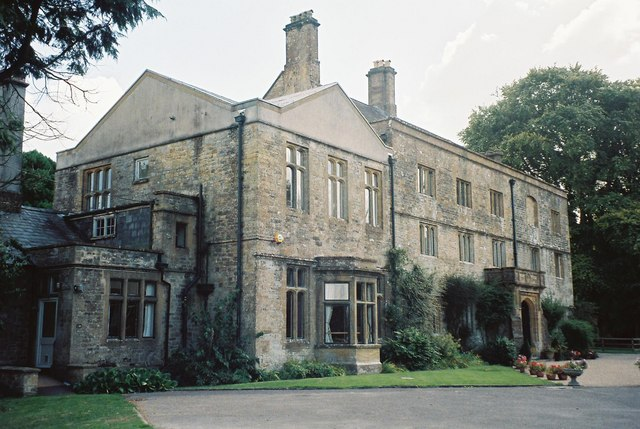
- Hooke Court

- Location within Dorset
- Population: 157
- OS grid reference: ST537001
- Unitary authority: Dorset
- Ceremonial county: Dorset
- Region: South West
- Country: England
- Sovereign state: United Kingdom
- Post town: Beaminster
- Postcode district: DT8
- Dialling code: 01308
- Police: Dorset
- Fire: Dorset and Wiltshire
- Ambulance: South Western
- UK Parliament: West Dorset

Hooke is a small village and civil parish in the county of Dorset in southern England, situated about 7 miles (11 km) northeast of the town of Bridport. It is sited in the valley of the short River Hooke, a tributary of the River Frome, amongst the chalk hills of the Dorset Downs. In the 2011 census the parish had a population of 157.

The name comes from the Old English Hoc meaning the hook or angle and referring to the land in a river bend. The spelling has changed over the years, the Doomsday Book recorded it as Lahoc and later variants include Hok (1229), La Hoke (1244) and Houc (1268).

Rampisham Down, the hill immediately northeast of the village, is the site of a transmitter station operated by VT Communications, broadcasting long-range radio signals for clients including BBC World Service. The outskirts of the village are home to Hooke Court and its surrounding parklands. Originally built in 1407 by Humphrey Stafford, the Court was extended in 1609 by the Marquis of Winchester.

To the southwest of the village are Warren Hill and the woods of Hooke Park on its western flanks.
