= Maiden Newton =

Village in Dorset, England

Coordinates: 50.7775°N 2.5728°W

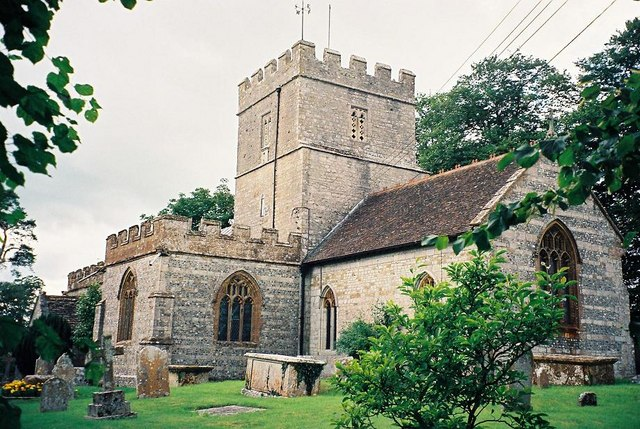
- Maiden Newton parish church of St Mary

- Location within Dorset
- Population: 1,119
- OS grid reference: SY597977
- Unitary authority: Dorset
- Ceremonial county: Dorset
- Region: South West
- Country: England
- Sovereign state: United Kingdom
- Post town: Dorchester
- Postcode district: DT2
- Dialling code: 01300
- Police: Dorset
- Fire: Dorset and Wiltshire
- Ambulance: South Western
- UK Parliament: West Dorset

Maiden Newton is a village and civil parish in the county of Dorset in south-west England. It lies within the Dorset Council administrative area, about 9 miles (14 km) north-west of the county town, Dorchester.

== Geography ==
The village is sited on Upper Greensand at the confluence of the River Frome with its tributary of equivalent size, the Hooke. Both these rivers have cut valleys into the surrounding chalk hills of the Dorset Downs. The A356 main road passes through the village. In the 2011 census the parish—which does not include the adjacent settlements of Frome Vauchurch and Tollerford— had a population of 1,119.

== History ==
In 1086 in the Domesday Book, Maiden Newton was recorded as Newetone; it had 26 households, 7 ploughlands, 18 acres (7.3 ha) of meadow and 2 mills. It was in Tollerford Hundred and the lord and tenant-in-chief was Waleran the Hunter.

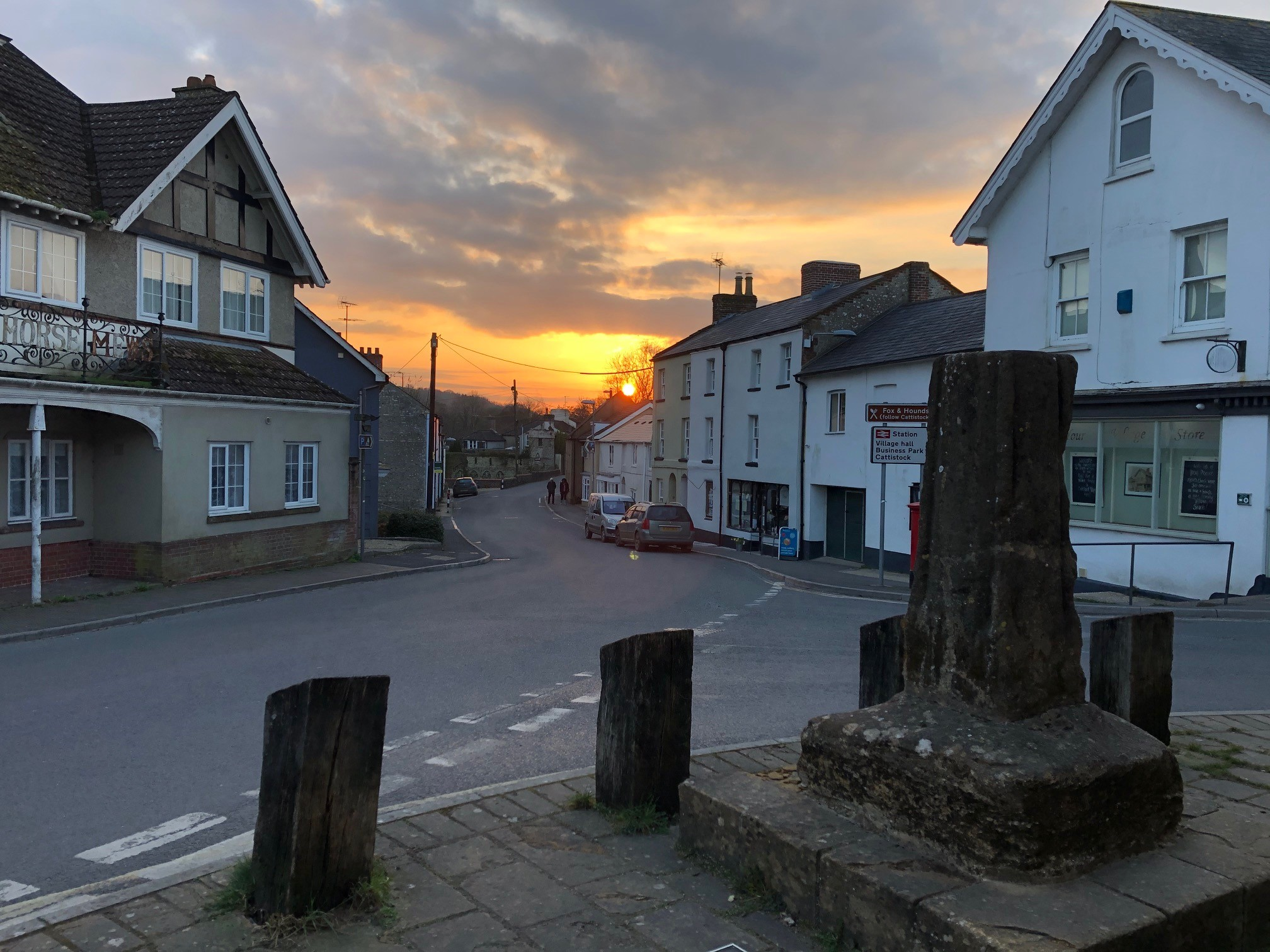
Centre of the village of Maiden Newton with the village cross in foreground

Maiden Newton was the basis for the village of Chalk-Newton, South Wessex, in many of the works of Thomas Hardy. In the vicinity of the village is evidence of Roman occupation and early British settlements. The parish church of St Mary contains much Norman work, with additions from the 14th and 15th centuries. The shaft of the Village Cross is 15th century and is Grade II* listed. There is also the shaft of a medieval cross in the churchyard which is a scheduled monument. Maiden Newton is also home to one of the country's oldest fire engines, restored and in full working order, the fire engine house built for it in 1842-3 is a grade II listed building.

Maiden Newton is in an electoral ward with the same name, which also contains much of the surrounding countryside including the villages of West Compton, Toller Fratrum, Toller Porcorum and Hooke. The population of this ward was 2,081 at the 2011 census.

== Transport ==
The village is served by Maiden Newton railway station on the Heart of Wessex Line. There was also a railway line from Maiden Newton to Bridport which opened in 1857 and was extended to West Bay in 1884. The Bridport branch line was recommended for closure in the Beeching Report of 1963. By the time the line closed in 1975 it was the last remaining branch line in Dorset. Work is underway to turn the line into a footpath and cycle track.

The A356 passes through the village as does National Cycle Network Route 26.

Three long distance footpaths the Macmillan Way and the Wessex Ridgeway pass through the Village as does the shorter Frome Valley Trail.
