= Hooke Court =

Manor house in Dorset, England

Coordinates: 50.8019°N 2.6663°W

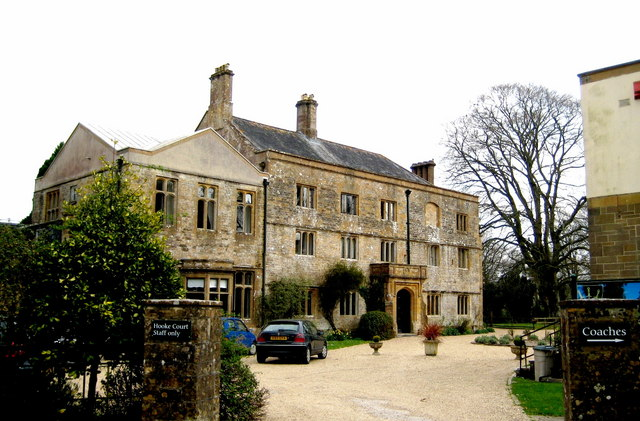
Hooke Court

Hooke Court is a 17th-century manor house in the parish of Hooke in Dorset, England. It is a Grade II* listed building built around the time of the English Civil War.

Standing in about 6 hectares (14 acres) of mature park and woodland, Hooke Court is on the outskirts of Hooke, a village in rural Dorset. It lies at the foot of Warren Hill.

In the Civil War it was damaged by fire by Roundheads but repaired in 1647 by the Duke of Bolton. There had previously been medieval buildings on the site.

Hooke Court was previously a boarding school for boys with educational, emotional or behavioural problems, from 1946 to 1992. Saint Francis School for Boys was run and managed by Society of Saint Francis.

Hooke Court is today used as a residential study centre. In 2007 it was featured on the television series Time Team which attempted to discover the nature of the medieval buildings.

== See also ==
- River Hooke
