= West Hill, Dorset =

Hill in Dorset, England

West Hill
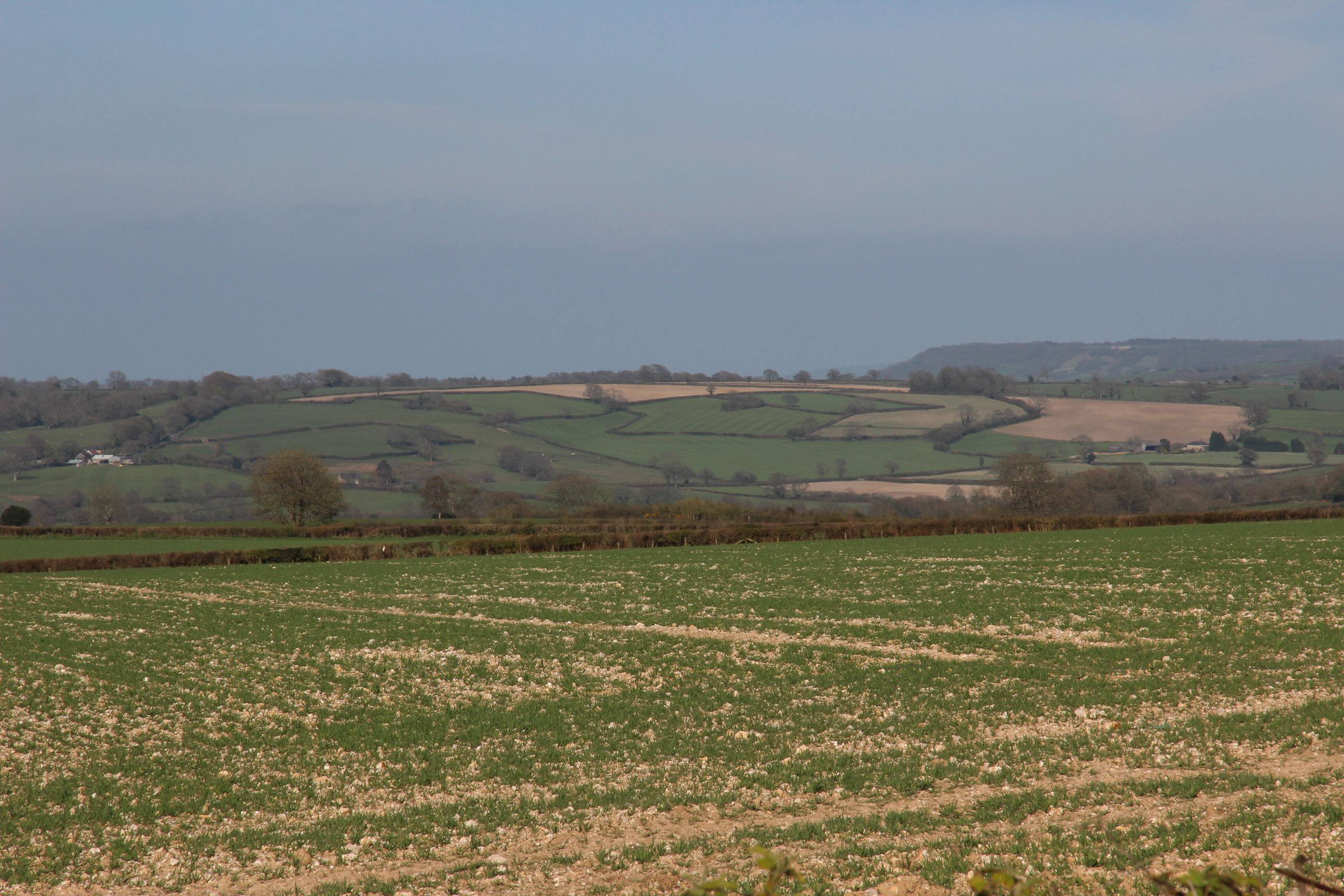
- West Hill (centre) seen from Toller Down Gate on the A356 to the west.

Highest point
- Elevation: 224 m (735 ft)
- Prominence: 63 m (207 ft)
- Parent peak: Lewesdon Hill
- Listing: Tump
- Coordinates: 50.8364°N 2.6168°W

Geography
- Location: Dorset, England
- Parent range: Dorset Downs
- OS grid: ST566042
- Topo map: OS Landranger 194

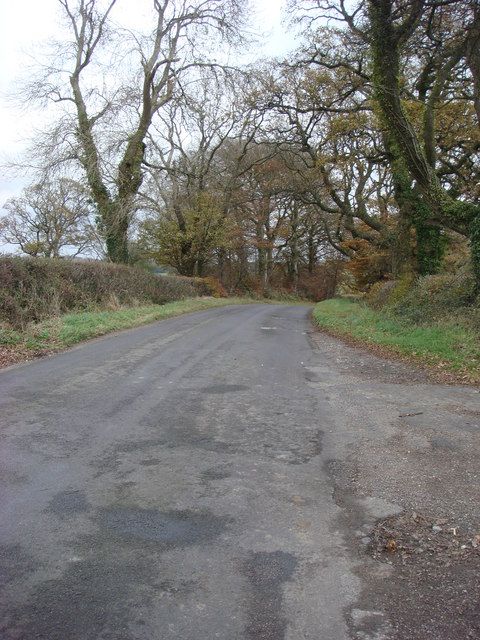
Horsey Knap, the lane running over the northern flank of West Hill into Evershot

West Hill is a prominent hill, 224 metres (735 ft) high, just to the west of the village of Evershot in the county of Dorset in southern England. Its prominence of 63 metres (207 ft) means it is listed as one of the Tumps. It is located within the Dorset Downs.

The summit is relatively flat and open. A public footpath runs past the summit to the south and there is a lane called Horsey Knap that crosses the northern flank of the hill and descends into Evershot.
