= Frome Vauchurch =

Parish in Dorset, England

Coordinates: 50.7734°N 2.5701°W

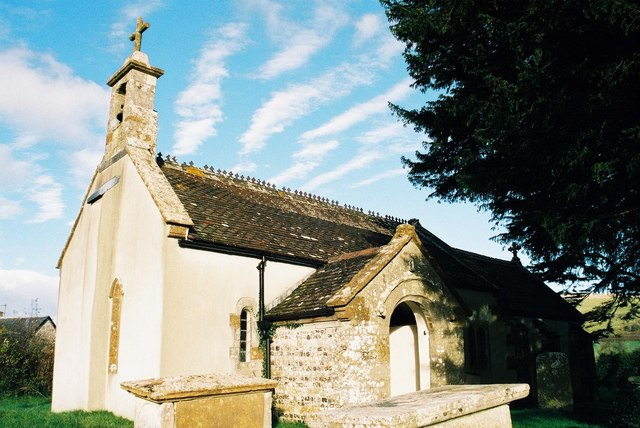
- Parish church of St Francis of Assisi

- Location within Dorset
- Population: 160
- OS grid reference: SY599972
- Unitary authority: Dorset
- Ceremonial county: Dorset
- Region: South West
- Country: England
- Sovereign state: United Kingdom
- Post town: Dorchester
- Postcode district: DT2
- Dialling code: 01300, 01308
- Police: Dorset
- Fire: Dorset and Wiltshire
- Ambulance: South Western
- UK Parliament: West Dorset

Frome Vauchurch is a parish in the county of Dorset in southern England, situated approximately 7 miles (11 km) northwest of the county town Dorchester. It includes the hamlets of Frome Vauchurch, Higher Frome Vauchurch, Lower Frome Vauchurch and Tollerford. Frome Vauchurch is sited in the Frome valley amongst the chalk hills of the Dorset Downs. The parish is adjacent to the village of Maiden Newton, with which the parish's hamlets are virtually contiguous. Dorset County Council's latest (2013) estimate of the parish population is 160.

The Frome Valley Trail and the Mackmillan Way long-distance trails pass through the parish.

Frome Vauchurch was the home of the writers Sylvia Townsend Warner and Valentine Ackland. They moved into a house called Riversdale beside the River Frome in 1937, which they first rented and later bought.

The Parish Church of St Francis is originally 12th century but was substantially rebuilt in the 17th century and restored in c.1879, and is a Grade II* listed building.
