= River Hooke =

River in Dorset, England

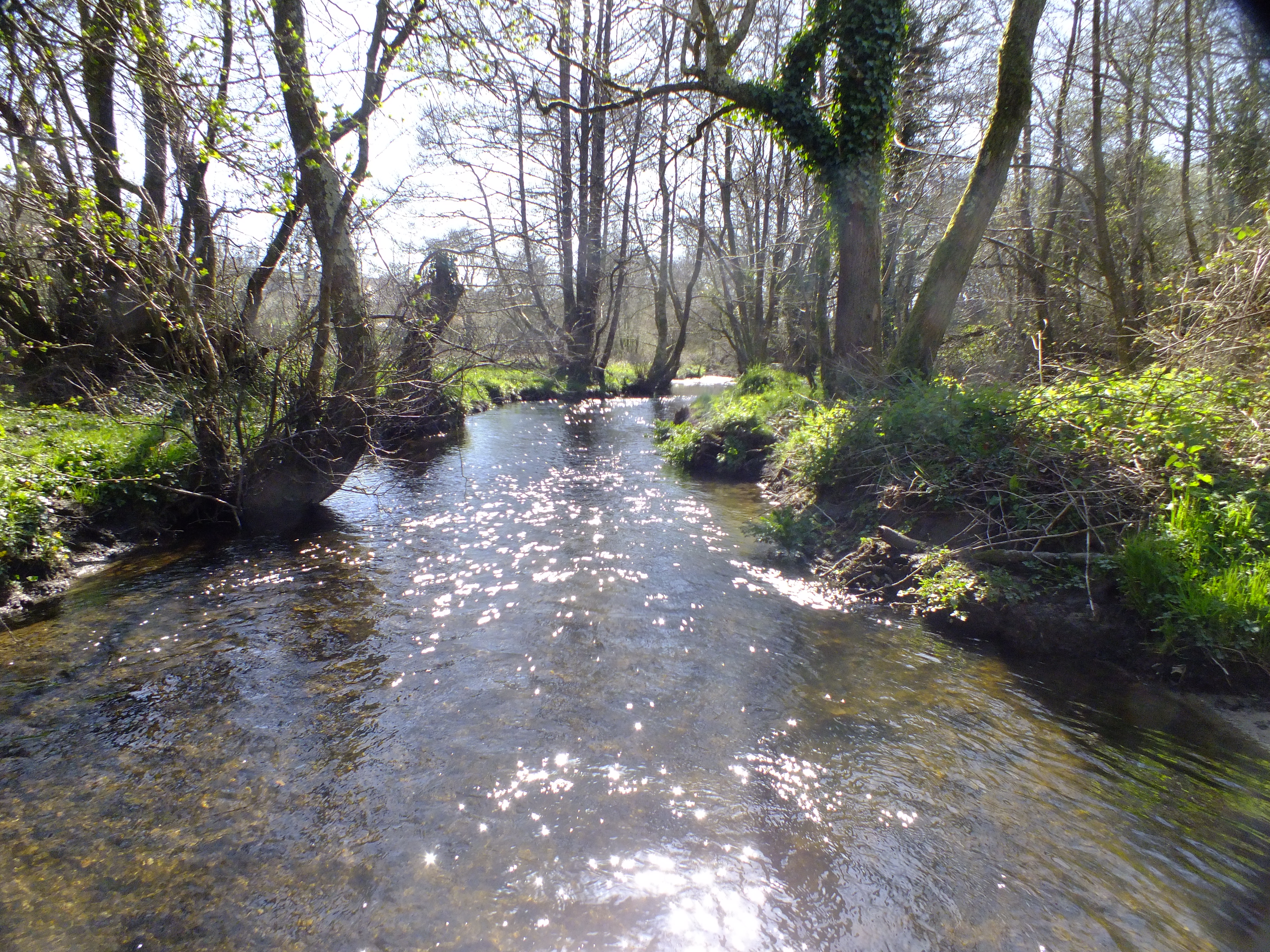
- River Hooke at Kingcombe Meadows

- Location within Dorset

Location
- Country: England
- County: Dorset

Physical characteristics
- Source
  - location: Dorset
- Mouth
  - location: Maiden Newton, Dorset
  - coordinates: 50.7772°N 2.5740°W

The River Hooke is a chalk stream in the county of Dorset in southern England. It runs from its source at Toller Whelme through the villages and hamlets of Hooke, Kingcombe, Toller Porcorum and Toller Fratrum to join the River Frome at Maiden Newton, a course of some 6 miles. The river was formerly called the River Toller, probably a Celtic river name meaning hollow stream or stream running in a deep valley. From the whence the name of the three Toller villages, as well as of the hundred of Tollerford. At some point, however, this former name was replaced in use by reference to a particular feature in the river's course: "Hooke" is a derivation of hoc, Old English for "sharp bend in a stream". It is possible that this description gave the village of Hooke its name, which then transferred to the river by back-formation.

Although the River Hooke is flanked on both sides by chalk slopes of the Dorset Downs, in its course it has cut down to greensand. According to the Dorset-born author and broadcaster Ralph Wightman, this has resulted in "many springy and boggy patches which are not typical of chalk valleys." Writing in 1965, Wightman commented that at Hooke village itself "the largest spring I have ever seen used to gush out of the steep hillside, and was immediately used for watercress."

There is a river level monitoring stations on the River Frome at Hooke.

== See also ==
- Hooke
- Hooke Court
