= Jerome Knapp Jr. =

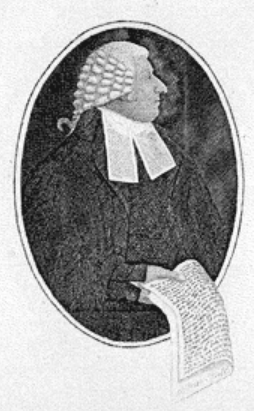
Jerome Knapp by John Kay

Jerome Knapp (born 1722, Walthamstow; died 1792, Bath) was an English barrister-at-law and 18th-century City of London administrator.

Knapp was Clerk to the Haberdashers' Company in the City of London and Clerk to the Home Circuit Assizes, and Treasurer of the Middle Temple (1789–92).

== Biography ==
Knapp was educated at the Middle Temple before being called to the bar in 1749. In 1754, he was appointed by the Worshipful Company of Haberdashers and the Assizes of the Home Circuit as Clerk, reputedly having purchased the latter post for £5,000. He became Treasurer of the Middle Temple in 1789, and died at Bath, Somerset in 1792.

== Family ==
The eldest son of Jerome William Knapp, Esq., of Chieveley, Berkshire, by his wife, Sarah Preston (heiress of her brother, Alderman Sir Thomas Preston), Knapp married, in 1758, Sarah daughter and eventual heiress of George Noyes, of Southcote, Berkshire previously of Andover, Hampshire (and descendant of William Noyes) by his wife, Anne, heiress of William Noake, High Sheriff of Berkshire.

He and his wife had eleven children, among whom were Jerome William Knapp, DCL, Thomas George Knapp, solicitor (for whom he secured founder's kinship at St John's College, Oxford), and Mary Anne, who married The Hon William Best MP (later 2nd Baron Wynford).

His family divided its time between London, and Symeon's Court (now Oxfordshire).
