= Toler =

Toler is a surname. Notable people with the name include:

- Burl Toler (1928-2009), American football official
- Dan Toler (1948–2013), American guitarist
- Daniel Toler (1739–1796), Irish politician
- Greg Toler (born 1985), American football player
- Lynn Toler (born 1959), American judge and television personality
- Penny Toler (born 1966), American basketball player
- Sidney Toler (1874–1947), actor and writer
- William Pinkney Toler (1826–1899), American artist

== See also ==
- Toller (disambiguation) § People
