= Toller Whelme =

Hamlet in Dorset, England

Coordinates: 50.8108°N 2.6865°W

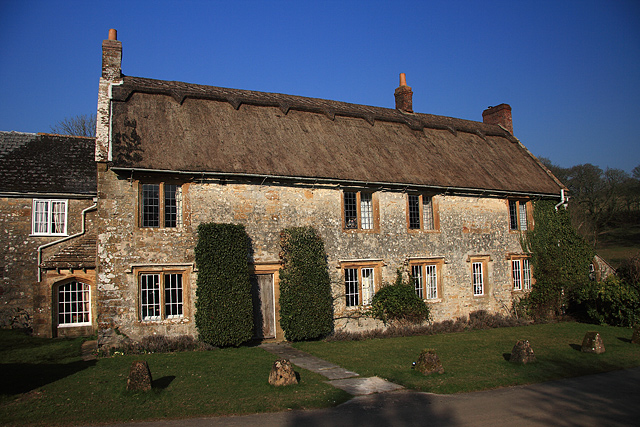
- Manor House, Toller Whelme

- Location within Dorset
- Population: <100
- OS grid reference: ST516015
- Unitary authority: Dorset
- Ceremonial county: Dorset
- Region: South West
- Country: England
- Sovereign state: United Kingdom
- Post town: Dorchester
- Postcode district: DT8
- Dialling code: 01308
- Police: Dorset
- Fire: Dorset and Wiltshire
- Ambulance: South Western
- UK Parliament: West Dorset

Toller Whelme is a small hamlet in Dorset, England, situated in the civil parish of Corscombe, approximately 2.3 miles (3.7 km) east of Beaminster, 6 miles (9.7 km) north of Bridport and 13 miles (21 km) north-west of Dorchester. There are seven homes in the hamlet: West Farm, Norcombe Hayes, Manor House, 1 & 2 West Farm Cottages, East Farm and Lake Farm.

Toller Whelme takes its name from the River Toller (the former name of the present River Hooke), at the source of which it stands: the second element Whelme means river source or spring in Anglo-Saxon. It has occasionally in the past also been known as Pinny's Toller or Penny Toller, from the name of the landowning Pinney family formerly established here at the manor house.

The Manor House was once the principal residence of a single estate farmstead which has been subsequently divided into separate properties and holdings. The Manor was once a grange farm of Forde Abbey near Chard.

Older buildings in the hamlet include the Manor House, a nearby converted barn and two nearby adjoining cottages (1 & 2 West Farm Cottages). The perimeter wall exterior of the Manor House exhibits 'sockets' that in the past held the roof joists of a series of small lean-to style cottages that no longer exist. In the hamlet there is also a farm, with a relatively new farmhouse that replaced the old dairy. A lake was created in front of the farmhouse in the 1970s to provide water for the farm cattle during drought conditions. A little further down the valley is Michael's Peace, a nature reserve managed by the Dorset Wildlife Trust. The reserve was created by Beaminster GP and environmental activist Dr Mike Hudson.

Toller Whelme is a modern ecclesiastical parish, formed in 1871 from the ancient parish of Corscombe; the Anglican church of St John was built the previous year. The church belongs to the Manor and has an unusual set of steel bells.

== See also ==
- Toller Fratrum
- Toller Porcorum
