= Hooke Park =

Woodland in South West England

Coordinates: 50.792°N 2.679°W

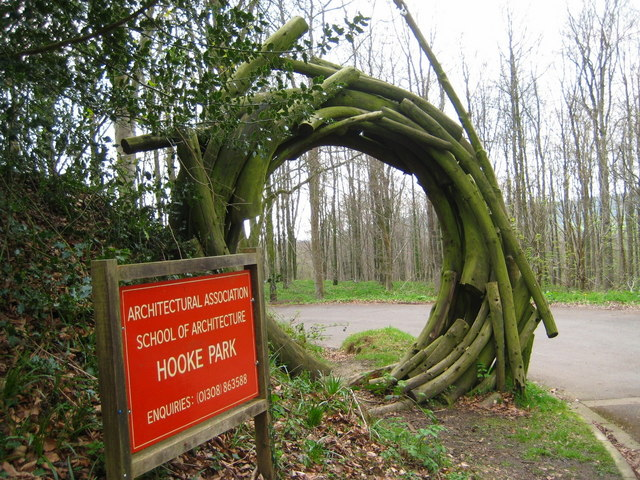
Entrance to Hooke Park

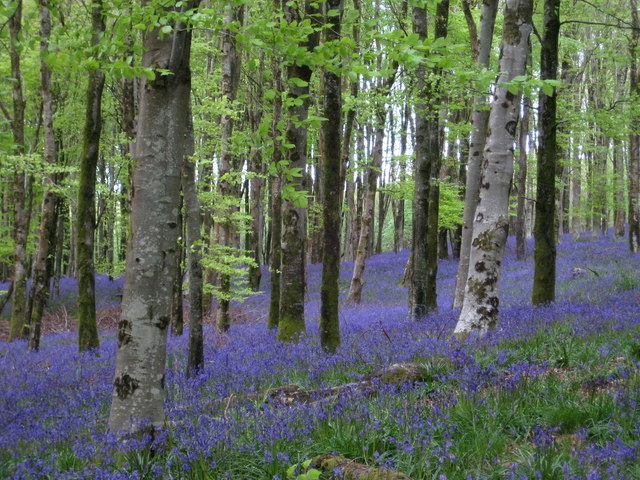
Bluebells in Hooke Park

Hooke Park is a 142 hectare woodland in Dorset, England located near the town of Beaminster and within the Dorset National Landscape area. The site is designated as ancient woodland and historically comprised a deer hunting estate. An educational campus is located at Hooke Park that was developed by the Parnham Trust following its purchase of the site in 1983. Led by furniture designer John Makepeace a School of Woodland Industries was established that aimed to "research, demonstrate and teach the better use of forest produce". The campus buildings demonstrate experimental timber construction techniques and include works by the late 2015 Pritzker Prize laureate Frei Otto, Edward Cullinan and ABK Architects.

In 2002 ownership of Hooke Park was transferred to the Architectural Association School of Architecture who use the site for visiting and residential courses, including programmes in which students design and construct new campus buildings. The Hooke Park woodland is renowned locally for its spring bluebells and is accessible through public rights-of-way. The estate's forestry is managed with the aim of researching new architectural applications for home-grown timbers.
