= Toller Fratrum =

Village and civil parish in Dorset, England

Coordinates: 50.773°N 2.598°W

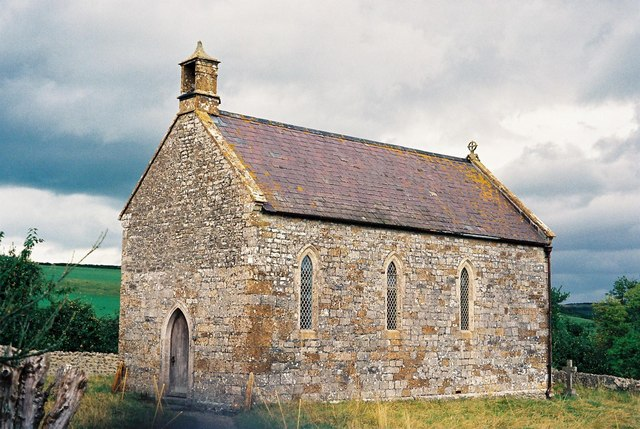
- Parish church of St. Basil

- Location within Dorset
- Population: 10
- OS grid reference: SY578972
- Unitary authority: Dorset
- Ceremonial county: Dorset
- Region: South West
- Country: England
- Sovereign state: United Kingdom
- Post town: Dorchester
- Postcode district: DT2
- Dialling code: 01300
- Police: Dorset
- Fire: Dorset and Wiltshire
- Ambulance: South Western
- UK Parliament: West Dorset

Toller Fratrum (/ˈfreɪtrəm/) is a very small village and civil parish in Dorset, England, near Maiden Newton, anciently in Tollerford Hundred.

The name is taken from the village's situation on the brook formerly known as the Toller, now called the Hooke. The addition Fratrum is the Latin for of the brothers and refers to the mediaeval ownership of the manor by the Knights Hospitaller, which distinguishes it from the other Tollers, namely Toller Porcorum and Toller Whelme. It is often referred to as Little Toller.

The village has a notable 16th-century farm house, Little Toller Farm, built largely by John Samways, who acquired the estate in 1540. The farm house was later occupied by the Fulford family. The church of Saint Basil was rebuilt in the 19th century but possesses not only an unusual Norman font, carved with archaic figures, but also a relief of Saint Mary Magdalene of the same period. Sir Francis Fulford, who acquired Toller Fratrum through marriage into the Samways family, was buried here in 1664.

The independent book publisher, Little Toller Books, is based in the village.

Dorset County Council's latest (2013) estimate of the population of the parish is 10.
