= Baron Wynford =

Barony in the Peerage of the United Kingdom

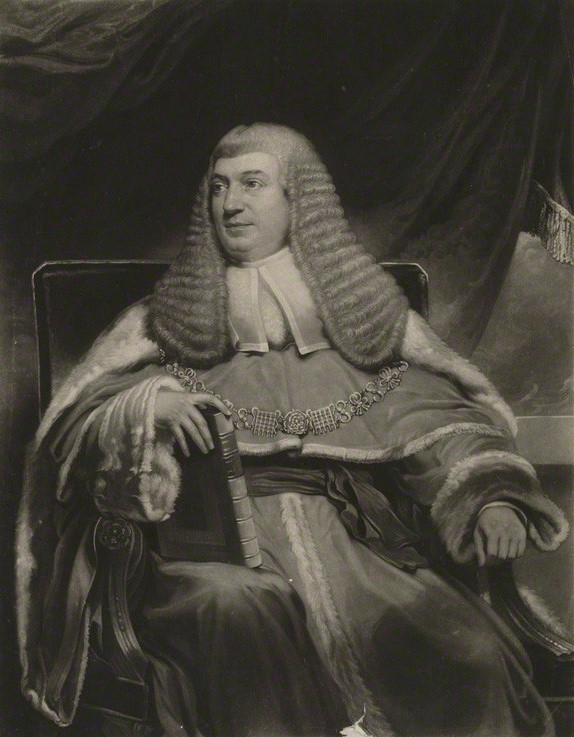
William Best, 1st Baron Wynford.

Baron Wynford, of Wynford Eagle in the County of Dorset, is a title in the Peerage of the United Kingdom. It was created in 1829 for the politician and lawyer Sir William Best. He served as Chief Justice of the Common Pleas from 1824 to 1829. His eldest son, the second Baron, represented Mitchell (also known as St Michael's) in the House of Commons from 1831 to 1832, when the constituency was abolished. On the death of his younger son, the fourth Baron, this line of the family failed. The late Baron was succeeded by his first cousin, the fifth Baron. He was the son of Reverend the Hon. Samuel Best, third son of the first Baron. As of 2023 the title is held by his great-grandson, the ninth Baron, who succeeded his father in 2002. Two of the 6th baron's grandsons through his daughter Hon. Jemima Best, are Labour life peers, John Hendy, Baron Hendy and Peter Hendy, Baron Hendy of Richmond Hill.

== Barons Wynford (1829) ==
- William Draper Best, 1st Baron Wynford (1767–1845)
- William Samuel Best, 2nd Baron Wynford (1798–1869)
- William Draper Mortimer Best, 3rd Baron Wynford (1826–1899)
- Henry Molyneux Best, 4th Baron Wynford (1829–1903)
- George Best, 5th Baron Wynford (1838–1904)
- Philip George Best, 6th Baron Wynford (1871–1940)
- Samuel John Best, 7th Baron Wynford (1874–1943)
- Robert Samuel Best, 8th Baron Wynford (1917–2002)
- John Philip Robert Best, 9th Baron Wynford (b. 1950)

The heir apparent is the present holder's only son Hon. Harry Robert Francis Best (b. 1987)
