= Evershot =

Village in Dorset, England

Coordinates: 50.839°N 2.605°W

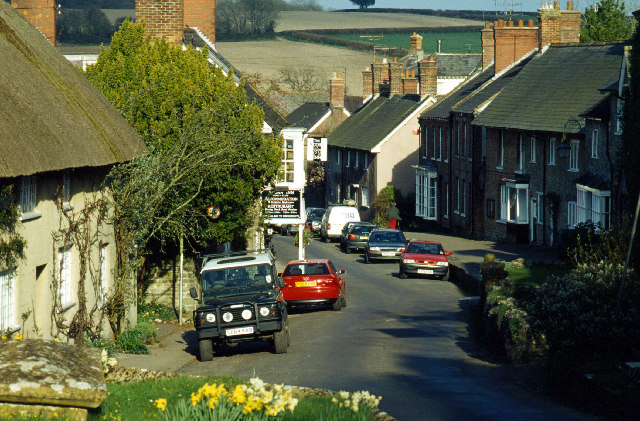
- Evershot

- Location within Dorset
- Population: 210
- OS grid reference: ST574045
- Unitary authority: Dorset
- Ceremonial county: Dorset
- Region: South West
- Country: England
- Sovereign state: United Kingdom
- Post town: Dorchester
- Postcode district: DT2
- Police: Dorset
- Fire: Dorset and Wiltshire
- Ambulance: South Western
- UK Parliament: West Dorset

Evershot is a village and civil parish in the county of Dorset in southwest England, situated approximately 7 miles (11 km) south of Yeovil in Somerset. It is the second highest village in the county at 175 metres (574 ft) above sea-level. Evershot parish encompasses part of the nearby hamlet of Holywell, 1.25 miles (2.01 km) east of Evershot village. Dorset County Council's latest (2013) estimate of the parish population is 210. The village has connections with the writer Thomas Hardy.

== Toponymy ==
There are several theories on the origins of the name Evershot. One is that it derives from 'Eafor's Holt', 'eafor' meaning wild boar and 'holt' meaning wood. A similar theory places the origin at 'eafor sceat,' meaning 'wild boar thicket.' This fits in with the history of the village, but does not account for other names the village has had in the past. In 1202, the village was referred to as 'Teversict,' and in 1268 'Theuershet.' This likely refers to the colour of the soil – the Old English word 'teofor' meaning red lead. Another theory is that the name derives from 'Varia', an alternative name for the River Frome, and 'shot', the Saxon word for a brook.

== History ==
It is hard to trace the history of the village before the Norman conquest, but it is believed Evershot began as a boar pen approximately 1,100 years ago. Due to its close proximity to the River Frome a settlement was built nearby.

The oldest remains to be found in Evershot are three standing stones named the Three Dumb Sisters, now a bench. Local legend says that these are three sisters turned to stone for dancing on the Sabbath. It is believed that they originate from a plot of land close to the village, but it is not known when they were built or moved. They are possibly Bronze Age in origin.

In 1628 Christopher Stickland founded Stickland's School "...for reading, writing and grammar... for the instruction and breeding of men children ... a schoolmaster there for ever to train up, instruct and teach the same child in good learning, true religion and the fear of God."

In the 18th and 19th centuries economic activities in the village included tanning, turnery and coopery. Local timber supplies provided raw materials for these industries, such as oak bark for tanning. Products such as tanned hides, bowls, ladles and cheese vats were sent for sale as far away as Bristol, and subsidiary trades evolved to support the village's population, which reached 600 in 1851.

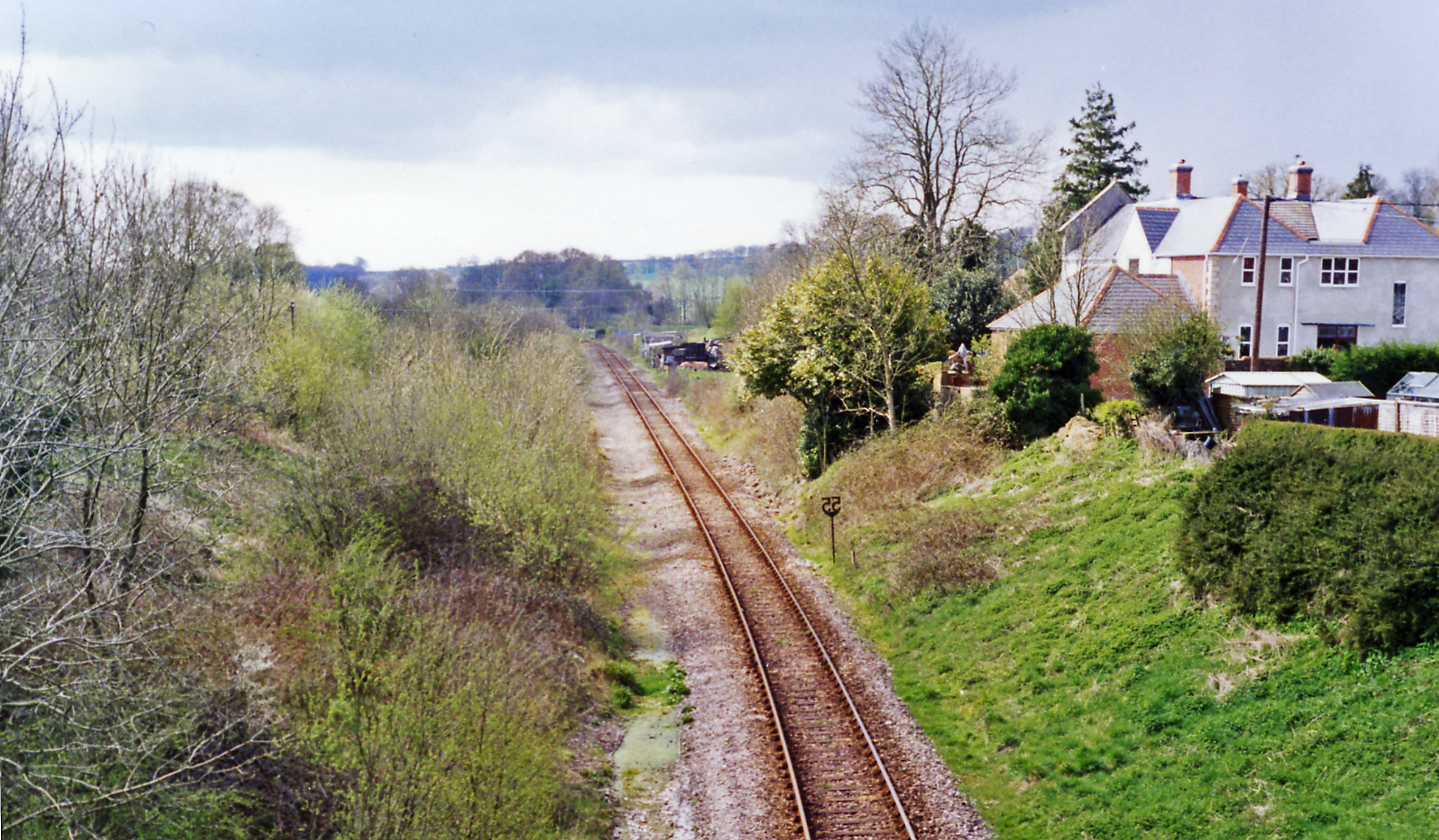
The site of Evershot's station at Holywell

In 1857 the Wilts, Somerset and Weymouth Railway (later the Great Western Railway) opened a line through the parish with a station for the village at Holywell, though difficulties were encountered in constructing a tunnel through the area's greensand.

A fire in the village in 1865 destroyed eighteen buildings and left more than a hundred people homeless. Three fire engines were required to extinguish the blaze. It is likely that, had there not been the river nearby, the entire village would have been destroyed. Not a single person was killed during the 'Great Fire of Evershot,' and a considerable amount was raised to help the homeless (£70 in two days, the equivalent of over £3000 today).

== Geography ==
Evershot village is sited on greensand approximately 175 metres (574 ft) above sea-level, among chalk hills of the Dorset Downs. It is the second highest village in the county, the highest being Ashmore in Cranborne Chase. The area forms the watershed between the drainage basins of the River Yeo, which flows north to the Bristol Channel, and the River Frome, which flows southeast to Poole Harbour. The village hall is the starting point for the Frome Valley Trail. Evershot is 7 miles (11 km) south of Yeovil, 11 miles (18 km) northwest of Dorchester and 10 miles (16 km) northeast of Bridport.

== Demography ==
Dorset County Council's latest (2013) estimate of the parish population is 210.

In the 2011 census the population of Evershot parish combined with the small neighbouring parishes of West Chelborough and East Chelborough was 334. No data from 2011 has been published for Evershot parish alone.

The historic population figures in the censuses between 1921 and 2001 are shown in the table below. Evershot parish is also shown separately for these census returns.

Historic Census Population Figures 1921—2001 (except 1941)
Census	1921	1931	1951	1961	1971	1981	1991	2001
3 parishes combined	428	411	380	356	330	310	310	300
Evershot Parish only	291	295	288	258	220	230	230	220
Source:Dorset County Council

== Landmarks ==
=== St Osmund's Church ===
The parish church of St Osmund is built on the site of an earlier chapel, dedicated to the Blessed Virgin, dating back to the time of Richard the Lionheart. The first rector of Frome St Quintin and Evershot is listed in the church simply as Herveus, in 1115. Only the font basin, chancel arch and part of the tower arch of this earlier chapel remain within the current church, which was renovated to some extent in the 15th century, again in 1765, before a final rebuilding in 1852—3 and 1864. It features a Perpendicular tower and arcades. In 1889 the organ was also restored, renovated, and added to. The church clock was gifted in 1853 by the 3rd Earl of Ilchester at a cost of £150. It was designed by Edmund Beckett Denison and built by Edward John Dent. It is hand-wound once a week. Between 1783 and 1787, the poet George Crabbe was rector of the church. The church is Grade II* listed.

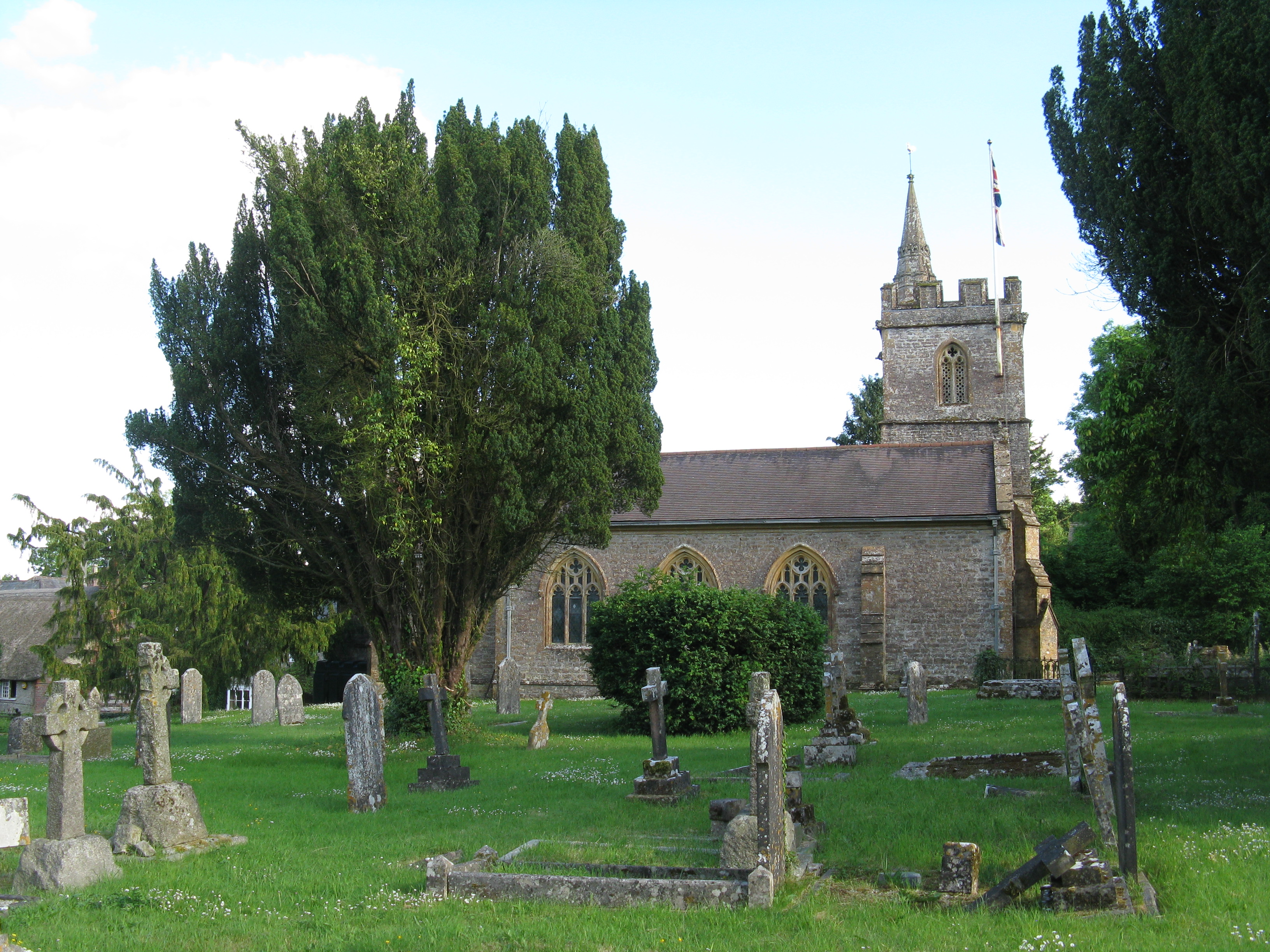
Parish church of St Osmund

The source of the River Frome is in Back Lane, close to the church. Next to it is St John's well, which was restored in 2000 and features information on local geology and history. The names of villagers were put on a plaque. The village is the starting point for the Frome Valley Trail long-distance footpath.

Summer Lodge Country House Hotel was built in 1798 as a dower house by Henry Fox-Strangways, 2nd Earl of Ilchester. It was enlarged in 1893 and in 1979 became a hotel.

The village hall was given to the village after being used by the military during the Second World War. It is mostly used for music and art events.

To the west is a prominent rounded summit known as West Hill which is 224 metres (735 ft) high.

== Thomas Hardy ==
Evershot has connections with the writer Thomas Hardy, who called it 'Evershead' in his fictional Wessex. The Acorn Inn featured as 'The Sow and Acorn' in several of his works, including Tess of the d'Urbervilles. Tess Cottage in the village is named after that novel's eponymous heroine, who stayed in a fictional version of it when visiting 'Evershead'.

Hardy was also an architect and in 1893 he designed an extension for what is now the Summer Lodge Country House Hotel in the centre of the village. Hardy's mother, Jemima Hand, was born and married in the neighbouring village of Melbury Osmond.

The Hardy Way long-distance footpath runs through the village.
