= Toller Porcorum =

Village in Dorset, England

Coordinates: 50.7795°N 2.6218°W

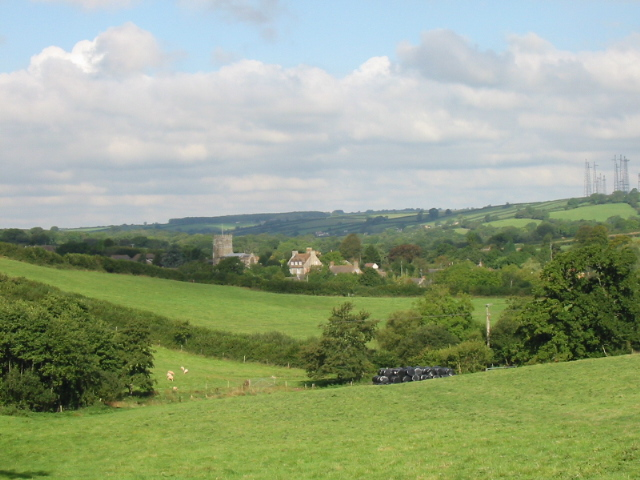
- Toller Porcorum viewed from the south

- Location within Dorset
- Population: 307
- OS grid reference: SY561980
- Unitary authority: Dorset
- Ceremonial county: Dorset
- Region: South West
- Country: England
- Sovereign state: United Kingdom
- Post town: Dorchester
- Postcode district: DT2
- Dialling code: 01300
- Police: Dorset
- Fire: Dorset and Wiltshire
- Ambulance: South Western
- UK Parliament: West Dorset

Toller Porcorum (/pɔːrˈkɔːrəm/) is a village and civil parish in Dorset, England, situated in the Toller valley 10 miles (16 km) northwest of Dorchester. In the 2011 census the civil parish—which also includes the small settlements of Higher and Lower Kingcombe to the north—had a population of 307.

== Population ==
A rural and slowly growing area with a population of 307, Toller Porcorum is a village of approximately 160 households.

== History ==
Like the other Toller villages of Toller Fratrum and Toller Whelme, the name was taken from the river, which is now known as the Hooke. The addition Porcorum means of the pigs in Latin; the village was in the past sometimes known as Swines Toller, but more often as Great Toller.

Toller Porcorum is also an ancient Anglican ecclesiastical parish. The church is dedicated to Saints Peter and Andrew and is remarkable for the "drooping chancel".

From 1862 to 1975, the village had a railway station on the Bridport Railway.

== The Old Swan ==
The village pub, The Old Swan, was closed by the brewery in 1999 and has since been converted into a private dwelling. Skittles was played there.

== Notable people ==
Despite its small size the village has been home to a number of notable people. George of Clarence was at one point the owner of the majority of the village.
