= List of hills of Dorset =

This is a list of hills in Dorset. Many of these hills are important historical, archaeological and nature conservation sites, as well as popular hiking and tourist destinations in the county of Dorset in southern England.

== Colour key ==
Class	Prominence
Marilyns	150 – 599 m
HuMPs	100 – 149 m
TuMPs	30 – 99 m
Unclassified	0 – 29 m

The table is colour-coded based on the classification or "listing" of the hill. The three types that occur in Dorset are Marilyns, HuMPs and TuMPs, listings based on topographical prominence. "Prominence" correlates strongly with the subjective significance of a summit. Peaks with low prominences are either subsidiary tops of a higher summit or relatively insignificant independent summits. Peaks with high prominences tend to be the highest points around and likely to have extraordinary views. A Marilyn is a hill with a prominence of at least 150 metres or about 500 feet. A "HuMP" (the acronym comes from "Hundred Metre Prominence) is a hill with a prominence of at least 100 but less than 150 metres. In this table Marilyns are in beige and HuMPs in lilac. The term "sub-Marilyn" or "sub-HuMP" is used, e.g. in the online Database of British and Irish Hills to indicate hills that fall just below the threshold. To qualify for inclusion, hills must either be 200 metres or higher with a prominence of at least 30 metres, below 200 metres with a prominence of at least 90 metres (the threshold for a sub-HuMP) or be in some other way notable. For further information see the Lists of mountains and hills in the British Isles and the individual articles on Marilyns, HuMPs and TuMPs. By way of contrast, see also the article listing Tumps (a traditional term meaning a hillock, mound, barrow or tumulus).

The county top (i.e. highest point) of Poole unitary authority is not strictly in the county of Dorset, but is included for interest because it falls within Dorset's historic county boundary.

== List of hills ==
Hill	Height (m)	Prom. (m)	Grid ref.	Class	Parent	Range/Region	Remarks	Image
Lewesdon Hill	279	185	ST437012	Marilyn	Staple Hill, Somerset	Marshwood & Powerstock Vales	Dorset's county top. One of Dorset's 4 Marilyns. Iron Age hill fort.	
Pilsdon Pen	277	83	ST413011	TuMP	Lewesdon Hill	Marshwood & Powerstock Vales	Dorset's second highest summit. For many years thought to be Dorset's highest point. Iron Age hill fort.	
Bulbarrow Hill	274	141	ST777055	HuMP, sub-Marilyn	Lewesdon Hill	Dorset Downs	Rawlsbury Camp, Iron Age hill fort. Paragliding site.	
Telegraph Hill	267	121	ST644050	HuMP	Lewesdon Hill	Dorset Downs	Paragliding site.	
Melbury Hill (Melbury Beacon)	263	66	ST873197	TuMP	Win Green	Cranborne Chase	Near Melbury Abbas. Trig point on summit National Trust wood on western flank above A 350.	
Breeze Hill	262	20	ST899204	Unclassified	Win Green	Cranborne Chase	Striking ridgeline above Zig Zag Hill near Melbury Abbas with sweeping views over Blackmore Vale; W (Dorset) end of Win Green ridge	
Lyscombe Hill	262	100	ST738029	HuMP	Telegraph Hill	Dorset Downs	Hill fort on Nettlecombe Tout (N spur)	
Watts Hill	262	69	ST673036	TuMP	Lewesdon Hill	Dorset Downs	Just above Minterne Parva and E of the A352 Dorchester to Middlemarsh road	
Lambert's Castle Hill	258	121	SY370988	HuMP	Lewesdon Hill	Blackdowns	Site of Lambert's Castle - Iron Age hill fort	
Bell Hill	258	50	ST800082	TuMP	Lewesdon Hill	Dorset Downs	Nr Turnworth, 5 miles W of Blandford Forum. Paragliding site.	
Eggardon Hill	252	117	SY546944	HuMP	Telegraph Hill	Marshwood & Powerstock Vales	Western extremity of the South Dorset Downs. Hill fort Paragliding site	
Toller Down	252	96	SY518031	TuMP, sub-HuMP	Lewesdon Hill	Dorset Downs	Just SW of A356 near Corscombe	
Ball Hill	251	74	ST721034	TuMP	Lewesdon Hill	Dorset Downs	Above Folly (paragliding site), 9 miles N of Dorchester.	
Dogbury Hill	248	13	ST660051	Unclassified	Watts Hill	Blackmore Vale	Hill fort site nr Minterne Magna on the A 352 NW spur of Watts Hill.	
Black Down	242	78	SY611876	TuMP	Lewesdon Hill	South Dorset Downs	Site of the Hardy Monument. 2 km NE of Portesham.	
West Hill	224	63	ST566042	TuMP	Lewesdon Hill	Dorset Downs	SW of Evershot, near the A 37	
Coney's Castle	222	17	SY371979	Unclassified	Lambert's Castle Hill	Blackdowns	Iron Age hill fort at SY372975 (ca. 210 m or 205 m)	
Drackenorth	221	60	SY532985	TuMP	Lewesdon Hill	Dorset Downs	3 km NNE of Powerstock on the Jubilee Trail	
Rampisham Down	219	8	ST544014	Unclassified	Toller Down	Dorset Downs	By A 356, about 12 km NW of Dorchester. SE extension of Toller Down ridge. Former transmission site for BBC World Service.	
Bubb Down Hill	217	40	ST592060	TuMP	Lewesdon Hill	Dorset Downs	Just E of A 37, about 10 km S of Yeovil	
Abbotsbury Castle	215	20	SY555866	Unclassified	Black Down	South Dorset Downs	Iron Age hill fort site. Trig point at summit. Part of Black Down ridge.	
Warren Hill	215	51	SY526994	TuMP	Lewesdon Hill	Dorset Downs	Location of Hooke Park	
Blackdown Hill	215	34	ST395038	TuMP	Lewesdon Hill	Blackdown Hills	8 km SW of Crewkerne, just NW of Pilsdon Pen	
Conegar Hill	214	47	ST439032	TuMP	Lewesdon Hill	Yeovil Scarplands	500 m N of Broadwindsor	
Waddon Hill	213	35	ST448015	TuMP	Lewesdon Hill	Marshwood & Powerstock Vales	Site of old Roman fort (Waddon Hill Fort, 207 m) near Beaminster.	
Payne's Down	211	62	ST385012	TuMP	Lewesdon Hill	Marshwood & Powerstock Vales	10 km ENE of Axminster	
Bookham Knoll	211	43	ST702046	TuMP	Lewesdon Hill	Dorset Downs	1 km SE of Buckland Newton	
Duncliffe Hill	210	96	ST826226	TuMP, sub-HuMP	Win Green	Blackmore Vale	Iron Age hill fort site.	
Swyre Head	208	150	SY934784	sub-Marilyn, HuMP, TuMP, Clem	Lewesdon Hill	Purbeck Hills	On Dorset coast E of Durdle Door. Tumulus on summit. Paragliding site.	
Hardown Hill	207	154	SY405942	Marilyn	Lewesdon Hill	Marshwood & Powerstock Vales	One of Dorset's 4 Marilyns.	
Seaborough Hill	204	80	ST429071	TuMP	Lewesdon Hill	Yeovil Scarplands	2 km SW of Crewkerne on the Somerset-Dorset border	
Nine Barrow Down	199	152	SZ007811	Marilyn	Lewesdon Hill	Purbeck Hills	One of Dorset's 4 Marilyns. Views of Poole Harbour.	
Ridgeway Hill	199	107	SY914817	HuMP	Swyre Head	Purbeck Hills		
Chardown Hill	194	68	SY396936	TuMP	Hardown Hill	South Dorset Downs	Dorset coast, E of Charmouth. Stonebarrow Hill is its SW spur.	
Creech Barrow Hill	193	38	SY921823	TuMP	Swyre Head	Dorset Heaths	One of Dorset's most distinctive landmarks. Highest point of the Heaths. Largest Tertiary hill in England. Site of round barrow.	
Hambledon Hill	192	131	ST845125	HuMP	Win Green	Cranborne Chase	Prehistoric hill fort site. Tumulus on summit.	
Golden Cap	191	63	SY384934	TuMP	Hardown Hill	South Dorset Downs	Highest point on the south coast of England.	
Chaldon Hill	178	90	SY783812 (est.)	sub-HuMP	Lewesdon Hill	South Dorset Downs	Dorset coast, W of Swyre Head and Lulworth Cove. Tumulus at summit.	
Bindon Hill	168	94	SY839802	TuMP, sub-HuMP	Lewesdon Hill	South Dorset Downs	Dorset coast, immediately E of Lulworth Cove	
The Verne	147	140	SY692737	HuMP	Lewesdon Hill	Isle of Portland	Summit occupied by HM Prison, Verne	
Maiden Castle	134	39	SY671884	TuMP	Lewesdon Hill	South Dorset Downs	Largest hill fort in Britain; 2.5 kilometres (1.6 mi) south west of Dorchester.	
Hambury Tout	134	35	SY815802	TuMP	Lewesdon Hill	South Dorset Downs	Dorset coast, immediately W of Lulworth Cove. Most popular route to Durdle Door. Trig point at summit; tumuli nearby. OS Landranger map gives ht as "134 (138)" metres.	
Colmer's Hill	127	35	SY440936	TuMP	Hardown Hill	Marshwood Vale	The local hill of Symondsbury. Obvious summit.	
Corfe Hills	78	2	SY998966	None	Lewesdon Hill	Dorset Heaths	Poole's county top, i.e. highest point in Poole unitary authority.	

Footnotes:

1. Ferranti's Summit Listings by Relative Height does not list Ridgeway Hill but suggests that the highest point of this stretch of the Purbecks is Povington Hill (198 m, drop 107 m). However, the current Ordnance Survey Landranger map (No. 194) agrees with Jackson (2009), which gives Ridgeway Hill as the highest point in the area at 199 m (drop 107 m).

2. The following summits listed by the North Dorset Ramblers have been omitted from the table as they are considered sub-peaks or alternative names of hills in the main list:

- Gore Hill (265 m), Dorset Downs, SW spur of Telegraph Hill
- Higher Melcombe Hill (262 m), Dorset Downs, possibly alternative name for Lyscombe Hill
- High Stoy (260 m) - Dorset Downs, NE spur of Telegraph Hill
- Nettlecombe Tout (258 m) - N spur of Lyscombe Hill with a hill fort.
- Weston Hill (250 m, ST504045 (est.)), NW extension of Toller Down ridge on A356
- Beaminster Down (244 m, ST493033), flanks of the Toller Down ridge, NE of Beaminster
- Ayles Hill (240 m, ST612007 (est.)), outlier of Telegraph Hill by A 37. Celtic field system. Spelt "Ayles's Hill" on OS Landranger map.
- White Way Earthwork (218 m, SY556917), N of A 35 X with 2 minor roads, nr Litton Cheney, 18 km W of Dorchester, S spur of Eggardon Hill.
- Stonebarrow Hill, SW spur of Chardown Hill.

== See also ==
- List of mountains and hills of the United Kingdom
- List of Marilyns in England
- Geography of Dorset
