= Payne's Down =

Hill in Dorset, England

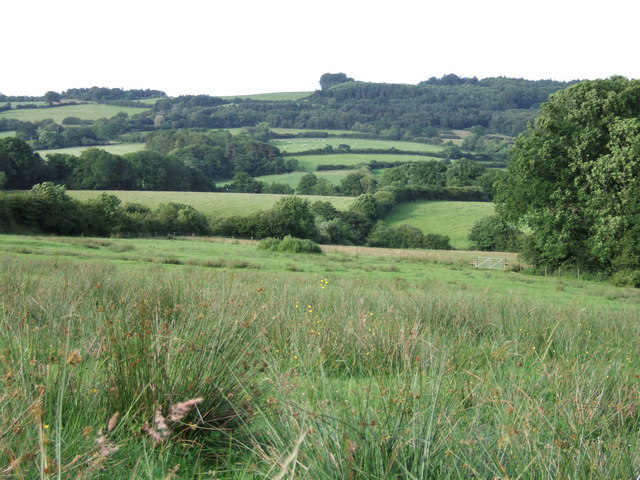
- View over the upper Blackwater valley to Payne's Down.

Highest point
- Elevation: 211 m (692 ft)
- Prominence: 62 m (203 ft)
- Parent peak: Lewesdon Hill
- Listing: Tump
- Coordinates: 50°48′28″N 2°52′25″W

Geography
- Location: Dorset, England
- Parent range: Marshwood & Powerstock Vales
- OS grid: ST385012
- Topo map: OS Landranger 193

Payne's Down is a prominent hill, 211 metres (692 ft) high, some 10 kilometres east-northeast of Axminster and 1 kilometre northwest of Birdsmoorgate, in the county of Dorset in southern England. Its prominence of 62 metres (203 ft) means it is listed as one of the Tumps. It is located within the Dorset Downs.

The summit forms an elongated, mainly wooded northwest–southeast oriented ridge, with a lane running along its northeastern flank along which there are some scattered cottages. There is a junction between the B 3165 and B 3165 in Birdsmoorgate. About 3 kilometres to the southwest is the hill fort of Lambert's Castle (258 m) and, across the valley of the River Synderford to the northeast is Pilsdon Pen (277 m) and further north, Blackdown Hill. The Wessex Ridgeway passes just to the west of Payne's Down.
