= Lambert's Castle Hill =

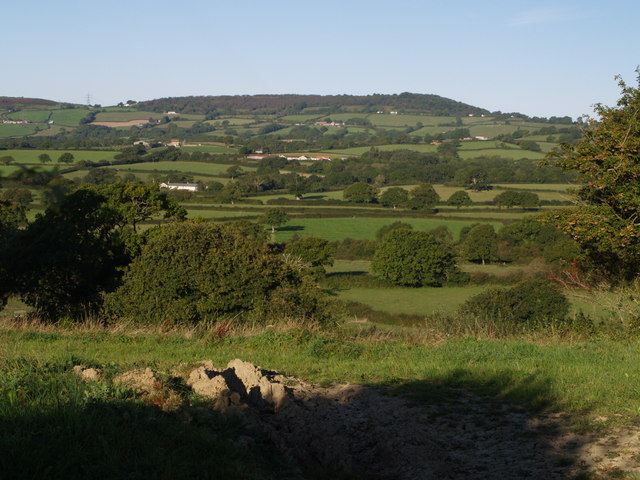
- Lambert's Castle Hill

Highest point
- Elevation: 258 m (846 ft)
- Prominence: 121 m (397 ft)
- Parent peak: Lewesdon Hill
- Listing: HuMP
- Coordinates: 50°47′14″N 2°53′34″W

Geography
- Location: Dorset, England
- Parent range: South Dorset Downs
- OS grid: ST389001
- Topo map(s): OS Landranger 193; Explorer 116

Lambert's Castle Hill (258 metres, 846 feet high) rises between the villages of Marshwood and Fishpond Bottom in the county of Dorset, England. It is part of the South Dorset Downs and its prominence qualifies it as one of the so-called HuMPs.

From the castle there are "spectacular views across the Marshwood Vale". Visible landmarks include: Pilsdon Pen and Lewesdon Hill (Dorset's county top) to the east, Hardown Hill, Langdon Hill and Golden Cap to the south.

In his book, The Highways and Byways of Dorset, Treves writes "Lambert’s Castle is a fine ridge, terminating in a truculent headland distinguished by a clump of fir trees. The view from the summit is maintained by many to be the view of the county. From hence can be seen Portland, the sea breaking on the Chesil Beach, the Fleet, a long stretch of the Devon coast and far inland, the uplands of Wiltshire and Somerset."

The hill lies about 7 kilometres east of Axminster and 6 kilometres north of Charmouth. The summit is 210 metres northeast of the trig point.

The hill is topped by an Iron Age hill fort, Lambert's Castle that is around 2,500 years old. The hilltop was used as a racecourse at some stage and was also the site of a fair for over 200 years.
