= Dorset National Landscape =

Protected area in Dorset, England

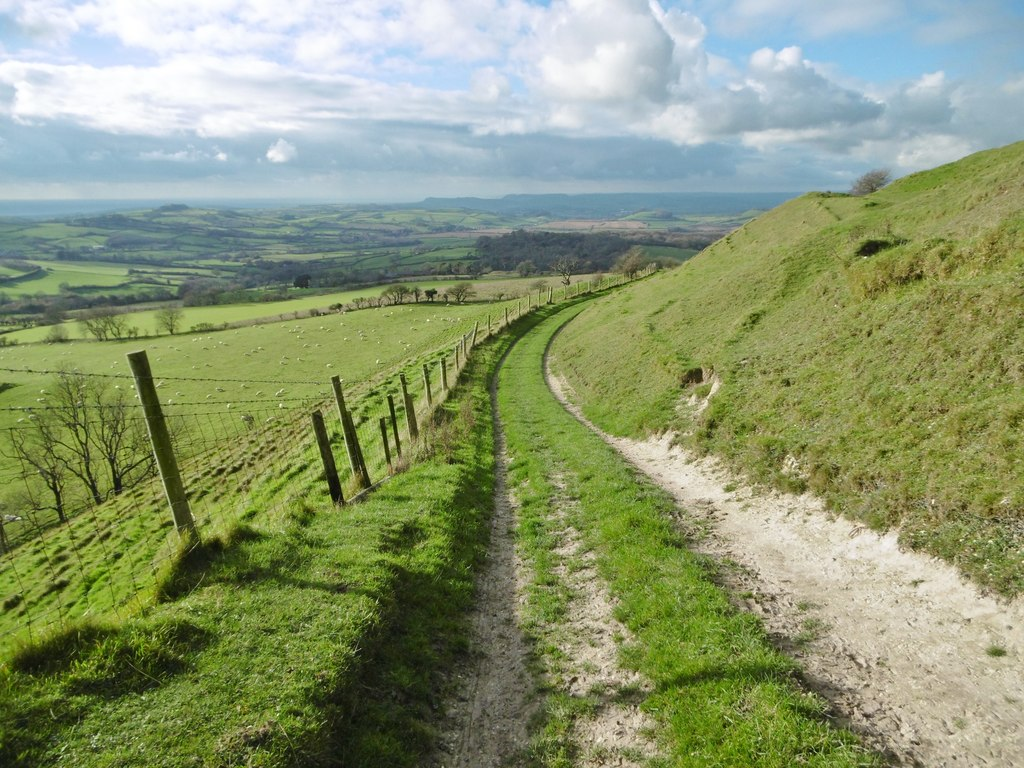
- Eggardon Hill in the Dorset Downs, overlooking the vales and rolling hills of west Dorset.

- Location of the National Landscape in England
- Location: Dorset, England
- Area: 1,129 km^{2} (436 sq mi)
- Designated: 1959
- Visitors: 14.4 million (in 2016)
- Administrator: Dorset National Landscape Partnership
- Website: dorset-nl.org.uk

Dorset National Landscape is a National Landscape area in Dorset, southern England, formerly known as and still legally designated as the Dorset Area of Outstanding Natural Beauty (AONB). The conservation designation means that the area is protected and promoted for its landscape value. The area was established in 1959, one of the early wave of National Landscapes to receive the designation.

Dorset National Landscape covers an area of 436 square miles (1,129 km^{2}), nearly 43% of the area of the ceremonial county of Dorset. It includes most of the Dorset section of the Jurassic Coast, England's only natural World Heritage Site, plus three Ramsar sites, nine Special Areas of Conservation, and three Special Protection Areas. Other parts of Dorset included in the designation are the chalk hills of the Dorset Downs, the Isle of Purbeck and Poole Harbour, and the vales and rolling hills in the west of the county.

Around 75,000 people live within the boundaries of the area, which encompass the towns of Beaminster, Bridport, Lyme Regis and Swanage. The area includes several popular tourist attractions, and tourists made an estimated 12.6 million day trips and 1.8 million staying trips to the area in 2016.

== Landscape areas and land use ==
The Dorset National Landscape area includes a variety of landscape types.

A large inland part of the area covers the Dorset Downs, an area of chalk downland with escarpments and chalk stream valleys noted for its calcareous grassland habitat. The Purbeck Hills form a separate narrow chalk ridge with escarpments in the southeast of the area. There is substantial arable land use on the chalk downland. North of Blandford Forum, the National Landscape area shares a boundary with the Cranborne Chase and West Wiltshire Downs National Landscape, which includes other sections of Southern England's chalk formation.

Under the escarpments of the chalk hills are broad clay valleys, and the National Landscape area includes the Bride Valley, Corfe Valley, and a small part of the Blackmore Vale. The valleys contain substantial areas of pasture land use, typically for dairy farming, patchworked with wet woodland and meadow habitats.

In the east, Poole Harbour featured tidal mudflats and marshland habitats, bordered by the Purbeck Heaths lowland heathland landscape, a small part of the Dorset Heaths (which otherwise largely lie outside the National Landscape). South of these is the Purbeck Plateau, an area of exposed limestone upland with a dramatic coastline and calcareous grassland habitat.

In the west, the area contains a mixed landscape of rolling sandstone hills with high cliffs along the Jurassic Coast, and further broad clay valleys, including the Marshwood Vale and Powerstock Vale. These hills support oak and ash woodlands, scrub habitats, and livestock farming. Here, the Dorset National Landscape shares a boundary with the Blackdown Hills National Landscape area.

== Recreation and tourism ==
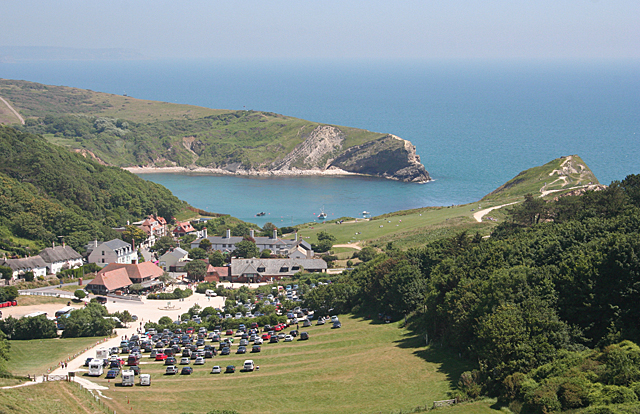
A visitor centre and car park occupy a hillside at Lulworth Cove, a popular attraction in the Dorset National Landscape.

The coast and countryside in the National Landscape area are valued for its recreational amenity value, with the Dorset National Landscape Partnership recognising pressure from a population of 2.15 million people who live within 40 miles of the National Landscape. The towns of Dorchester, Poole and Weymouth are immediately adjacent to the boundary.

The natural beauty of the area attracts tourism, and there are several attractions within the boundary that have been described as tourist honeypot sites, including Abbotsbury, Cerne Abbas, Durdle Door, Lulworth Cove, and Lyme Regis.

Visitor spending was estimated to support nearly 13,000 full-time equivalent jobs and contribute nearly £860 million to the local economy in 2016. Tourism creates challenges for the area, including the seasonal nature of many employment and business opportunities, and visitor management at some of the most popular locations, particularly on the coast, where surges in visitor numbers can overwhelm the rural infrastructure. Tourism puts pressure on the landscape through erosion, litter, traffic and car parking, the need to provide visitor facilities, and competition for local services. The Purbeck Heaths area of the National Landscape is additionally vulnerable to fire caused by visitors. These pressures were experienced especially acutely during the summers of 2020 and 2021, when the COVID-19 pandemic made international tourism difficult, leading to a surge of domestic tourism in the area.

== Governance and ownership ==
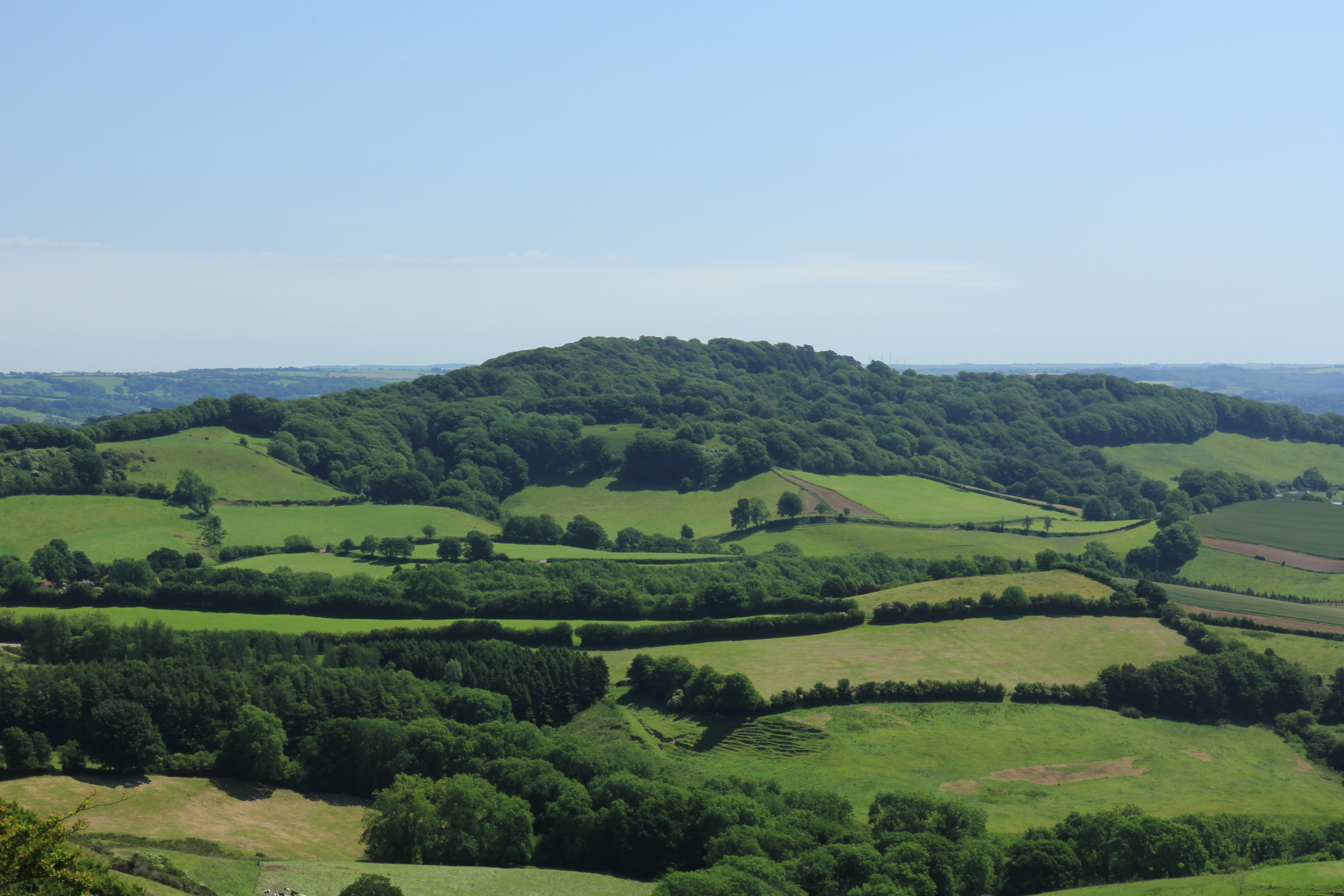
Lewesdon Hill, one of several National Trust properties in the National Landscape.

Although branded as a "National Landscape", the legal designation for the area is Area of Outstanding Natural Beauty. This designation does not affect land ownership, and most of the Dorset National Landscape area is privately owned by farms, estates and households.

Some of the land is owned and managed for conservation by charities, with the National Trust having some substantial holdings in the Isle of Purbeck and the west Dorset coast, alongside Brownsea Island and several smaller inland properties at Cerne Abbas Giant, Eggardon Hill, Hambledon Hill, Lambert's Castle, Lewesdon Hill, Pilsdon Pen and Turnworth Down. Dorset Wildlife Trust and the Royal Society for the Protection of Birds (RSPB) also own several natural reserves within the area. As of 2019 there were 54.61 square kilometres (21.09 sq mi) of always open and accessible land within the boundary.

AONBs were created to "conserve and enhance natural beauty" and a National Landscape Partnership of local organisations exists to support this by encouraging sustainable development and land management in the area. It is led by Dorset Council and includes representation from parish councils, conservation organisations (National Trust, Dorset Wildlife Trust, RSPB and Campaign to Protect Rural England), local landowners and businesses (through the Country Land and Business Association, National Farmers' Union and local enterprise partnership), and government agencies (Environment Agency and Natural England). As the land in the area is largely privately owned, the main mechanisms for the partnership are through the development of an area management plan, engagement with the planning system, advising and influencing the owners and users of the land, and a Sustainable Development Fund to support community projects. As of 2019 the partnership had a budget of around £290,000.

== History ==
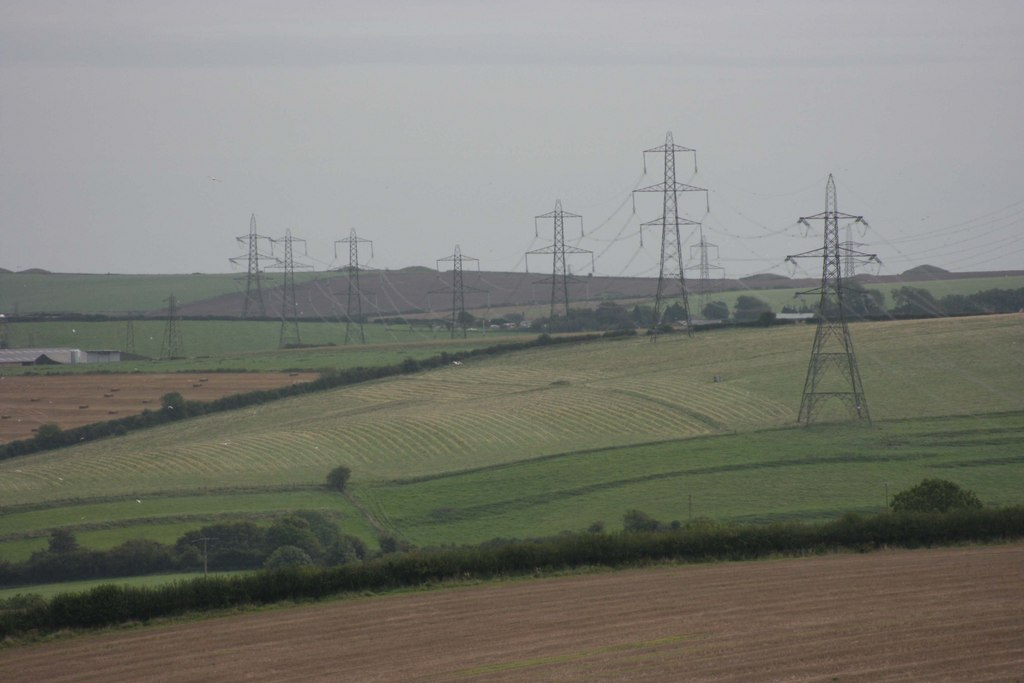
Powerlines in the National Landscape near Winterbourne Abbas which were replaced underground in 2022.

Dorset National Landscape was one of an early wave of AONBs to be designated in the 1950s in the wake of the National Parks and Access to the Countryside Act 1949.

In 2011, the A354 Weymouth Relief Road was constructed, including a controversial cutting through the South Dorset Ridgeway in the AONB, which environmental groups argued would have a significant adverse impact on the area.

In 2022, National Grid removed 22 of its pylons judged to have significant adverse visual impact on the AONB after completing a project to bury 6 miles (9 km) of its 400kV circuit over the South Dorset Ridgeway.

The AONB rebranded as Dorset National Landscape on 22 November 2023, as part of a national initiative to emphasise the importance of AONBs.

== Bibliography ==
- Finneran, Niall; Hewlett, Denise; Clarke, Richard (2024). Managing Protected Areas. People and Places. Palgrave Macmillan. doi:10.1007/978-3-031-40783-3. ISBN 978-3-031-40782-6.
