= Conegar Hill =

Hill in Dorset, England

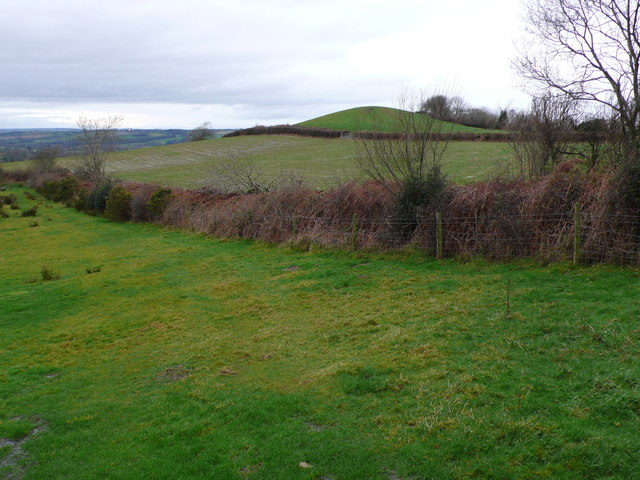
- View from Conegar Hill of its northern sub-summit, Blagdon Hill.

Highest point
- Elevation: 214 m (702 ft)
- Prominence: 47 m (154 ft)
- Parent peak: Lewesdon Hill
- Listing: Tump
- Coordinates: 50°49′34″N 2°47′49″W

Geography
- Location: Dorset, England
- Parent range: Yeovil Scarplands
- OS grid: ST439032
- Topo map: OS Landranger 193

Conegar Hill is a prominent rise, 214 metres (702 ft) high, just north of the village of Broadwindsor in the Yeovil Scarplands, in the county of Dorset in southern England. It has a prominence of 51 metres (167 ft) which classifies it as one of the Tumps.

The actual summit is unwooded and bounded to the east and west by tributaries of the River Axe and to the south by the Broadwindsor col to Waddon Hill. To the north is Blagdon Hill, a subsummit on the same ridge. The B3164 from Broadwindsor crosses the southeastern flank of Conegar Hill to join the A 3066 at Whetley Cross 2 kilometres to the northeast. A small lane, branches off northwards across the western side of the hill.

The name "Conegar" derives from the early Medieval English term "cony-garth" literally meaning rabbit yard. The name was chosen as the hill was possibly the remnants of an ancient man-made pillow mound, used for raising rabbits or because of the close resemblance to a pillow mound.
