= Seaborough Hill =

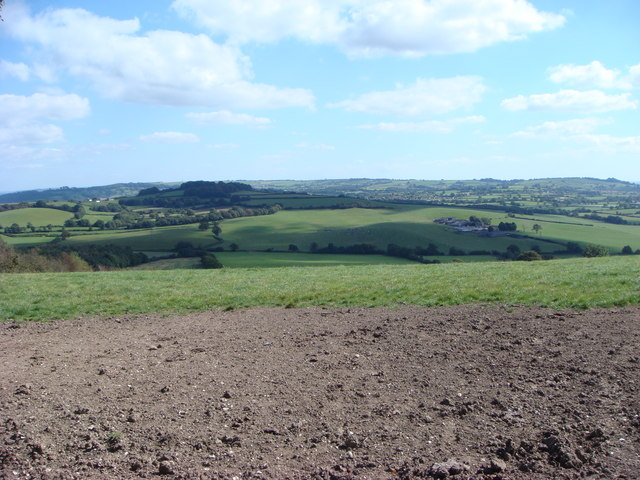
- View from Seaborough Hill of farmland around the Axe river valley.

Highest point
- Elevation: 204 m (669 ft)
- Prominence: 80 m (260 ft)
- Parent peak: Lewesdon Hill
- Listing: Tump
- Coordinates: 50°49′34″N 2°47′49″W

Geography
- Location: Dorset and Somerset, England
- Parent range: Yeovil Scarplands
- OS grid: ST429071
- Topo map: OS Landranger 193

Seaborough Hill is a prominent ridge, 204 metres (669 ft) high, on the Dorset-Somerset border in the Yeovil Scarplands in southwestern England. It has a prominence of 80 metres (260 ft) which classifies it as one of the Tumps.

Seaborough Hill rises immediately north of the village of Seaborough and about 3 kilometres southwest of the town centre of Crewkerne. A minor road traverses the summit from north to south and there is a trig point (201 m) by the lane at the northern end of the summit ridge, near Honeydown Farm. There are scattered woods on the western and eastern flanks of the hill. The River Axe runs past the hill to the south and two major trails - Liberty Trail and Monarch's Way bypass it to the north and south respectively. The county boundary runs along the ridgeline before swinging around the northern spur of the hill and heading away to the southeast.
