= Black Dawn =

Black Dawn may refer to:

- Black Dawn (album), a 2016 album by Cactus
- Black Dawn (2005 film), a film starring Steven Seagal
- Black Dawn (1943 film), a Hungarian drama film
- Black Dawn (video game), a PlayStation and Sega Saturn video game
- Black Dawn (1993 video game), a game for the Amiga personal computer; see AMOS (programming language) § Software
- Black Dawn, the seventh novel in the Night World series by L.J. Smith
- The Black Dawn, a science fiction multimedia experience produced by New Renaissance Pictures

== See also ==
- Blackdown (disambiguation)
