= Weston Hills =

Weston Hills may refer to:

- Weston Hills, Lincolnshire, a hamlet in Lincolnshire, United Kingdom
- Weston Hills, Baldock, a local nature reserve in Hertfordshire, United Kingdom
  - Weston Hills Tunnel, a road tunnel near the nature reserve
- Weston Hill, a hill in Dorset, United Kingdom
- Weston Hills Asylum, an asylum in the Nightmare on Elm Street franchise
