= Blackdown Hill =

Blackdown Hill may refer to:

- Blackdown Hill, Dorset (215 m), one of Dorset's high points, 8 km SW of Crewkerne
- Blackdown, West Sussex (280 m), near Fernhurst, highest hill in the historic county of Sussex.
- Blackdown Hills, a hill range and natural landscape region in Dorset and Somerset.
