= Blackdown =

Blackdown or Black Down may refer to:

== Places ==
=== Australia ===
- Blackdown, Queensland, a locality in the Central Highlands Region
- Blackdown Tableland National Park in Queensland.

=== Canada ===
- Blackdown Cadet Training Centre, a Canadian Cadet training centre (Tri-Force) located at CFB Borden, Ontario.

=== England ===
- Blackdown, Dorset, a village near Chard
- Black Down, Dorset, a hill near Portesham
- Blackdown, Hampshire, a village near Winchester
- Black Down, Somerset, a hill in the Mendip Hills
- Blackdown, Warwickshire, a village near Leamington Spa
- Blackdown, West Sussex, a hill also spelt Black Down
- Blackdown Hill, Dorset, one of Dorset's highest points
- Blackdown Hills, a range of hills in Somerset and Devon
- Princess Royal Barracks, Deepcut (Blackdown Camp), a World War II army camp near Aldershot, Hampshire

== Computing ==
- Blackdown Java, a port of Sun's Java virtual machine to Linux.

== Popular culture ==
- "Blackdown", a song by Patrick Wolf from The Bachelor
- "Blackdown", a song by French artist Laurent Voulzy from Lys & Love
