= Stonebarrow Hill =

Hill in Dorset, England

Coordinates: 50.7368°N 2.8754°W

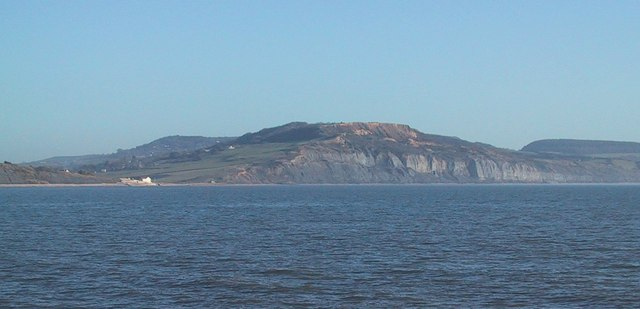
- Stonebarrow Hill

Highest point
- Elevation: 148 m (486 ft)
- Parent peak: Hardown Hill

Geography
- Location: Dorset, England
- Parent range: South Dorset Downs
- OS grid: SY396936
- Topo map: OS Landranger 193

Stonebarrow Hill is a hill, east of Charmouth, near the Dorset coast in southern England. It has a height of 148 metres (486 ft) and forms the west-southwestern spur of Chardown Hill. Stonebarrow and the surrounding area is notable for its landslides. The hill is often a starting point for walks around the Golden Cap estate.

There is a National Trust Centre at Stonebarrow Hill and also a permanent orienteering course established by Wimborne Orienteers in conjunction with the Trust.

== See also ==
- List of hills of Dorset
