= Ryall, Dorset =

Village in Dorset, England

Coordinates: 50.751°N 2.8429°W

Ryall
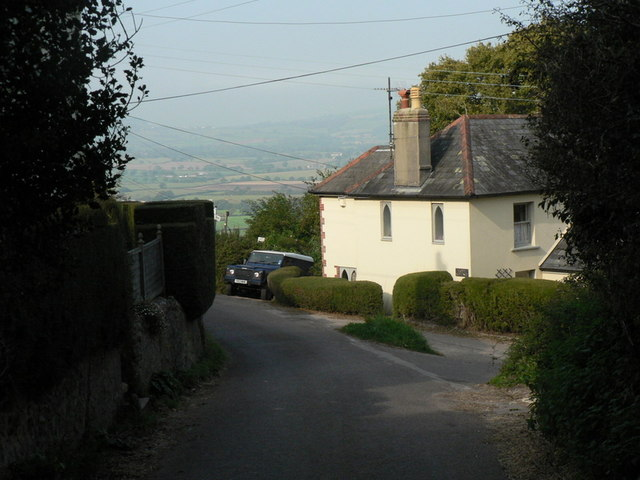

- Location within Dorset
- OS grid reference: SY407949
- Unitary authority: Dorset
- Ceremonial county: Dorset
- Region: South West
- Country: England
- Sovereign state: United Kingdom
- Post town: Bridport
- Postcode district: DT
- Police: Dorset
- Fire: Dorset and Wiltshire
- Ambulance: South Western
- UK Parliament: West Dorset

Ryall is a small village in the county of Dorset, on the south coast of Great Britain. It is situated roughly midway between the towns of Bridport and Lyme Regis, with the county town of Dorchester about 20 miles to the east. The village lies on the northern slopes of Hardown Hill, about 2 miles inland from the Jurassic Coast World Heritage Site. To the north the village looks across the Marshwood Vale towards a line of hills including Pilsdon Pen. Ryall is the home of 200 people.
