= Weston Hill =

Hill in Dorset, England

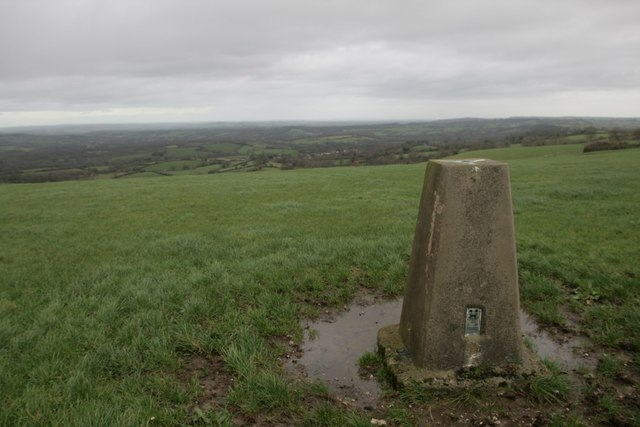
- Trig Point

Highest point
- Elevation: 250 m (820 ft)
- Coordinates: 50.8418°N 2.7092°W

Geography
- Location: Dorset, England
- Parent range: Dorset Downs
- OS grid: ST504045
- Topo map: OS Explorer

Weston Hill is a hill, 250 metres (820 ft) high, on the A 356, 1 kilometre west of Corscombe in the county of Dorset in southern England. It is located within the Dorset Downs. It is named after the hamlet of Weston to the northeast.

The summit is marked by a trig point just north of the A 356, and there is a transmission mast about 100 metres to the northwest. To the east the terrain drops steeply towards Corscombe. To the southwest it descends gently to Beaminster Down before dropping sharply at Mintern's Hill towards Beaminster.
