= Blackmore Vale and Vale of Wardour =

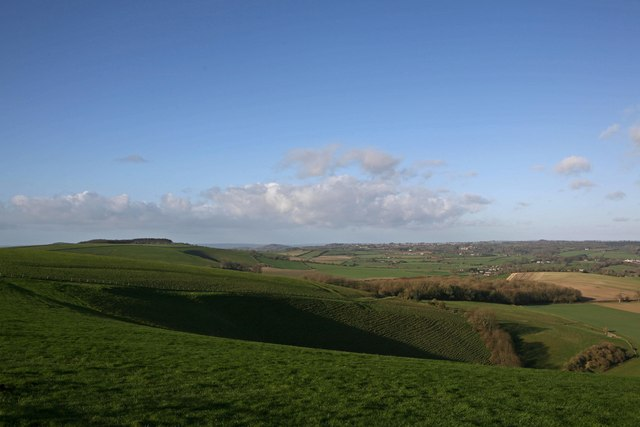
Donhead Hollow from Win Green

The Blackmoor Vale and Vale of Wardour area is a natural region in the counties of Dorset, Somerset and Wiltshire in southern England.

The region is listed as National Character Area 133 by Natural England, the UK Government's advisor on the natural environment. Its irregularly shaped area covers 78,414 hectares (302.76 sq mi) and runs from Batcombe in the southwest to Frome and Warminster in the northeast, and from Wincanton in the west to Compton Chamberlayne in the east. To the west are the Yeovil Scarplands, to the north are the Mendip Hills and Avon Vales, to the south and east are the scarps of the Dorset Downs and the West Wiltshire Downs.

The heart of Blackmoor Vale and the Vale of Wardour is the lush, clay vales, mainly given over to pasture, and characterized by an even pattern of straight-sided, hedged fields, scattered woodlands, dense hedgerows and common hedgerow trees. Willows and alders along the banks of its streams and the hanging mists give it an almost wetland feel. Thomas Hardy described it as "the beautiful Vale of Blackmoor... in which the fields are never brown and the springs never dry." There are few villages; instead farmsteads and hamlets dot the landscape.

To the east and north the view is interrupted by low limestone hills, and, occasionally, hills like Duncliffe rise dramatically from the plain. The Frome valley in the north is thinly populated, settlements and parks on the valley sides looking down on arable farmland. In the east along the Vale of Wardour, settlement increases and arable farming is also more prevalent here.

The region has 5 Special Areas of Conservation: Rooksmoor; Fontmell & Melbury Downs; Holnest; River Avon; Chilmark Quarries; and Cerne & Sydling Downs. The main watercourses are the rivers Stour, Nadder, Cale, Lydden, Frome, Brue and Wylye.
