= Toller Down =

Hill in Dorset, England

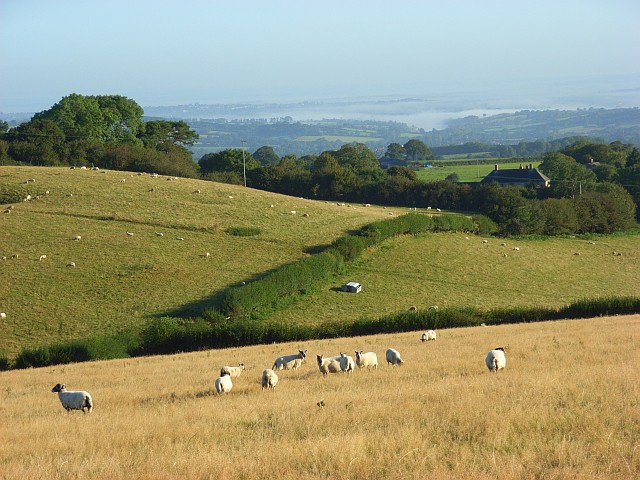
- Toller Down: rolling pastures above a misty valley looking towards Yeovil.

Highest point
- Elevation: 252 m (827 ft)
- Prominence: 91 m (299 ft)
- Parent peak: Lewesdon Hill
- Coordinates: 50°49′31″N 2°41′08″W

Geography
- Location: Dorset, England
- Parent range: Dorset Downs
- OS grid: ST518031
- Topo map: OS Landranger 194

Toller Down is one of the highest hills in the county of Dorset, England. It stands 252 metres (827 feet) high and is just 200 metres west of the main A356 road from Dorchester to Crewkerne. It is part of the Dorset Downs. Its prominence of just under 100 metres classifies it as a sub-HuMP.

The summit is about 2 kilometres south of the village of Corscombe.

There are standing stones (the Hore Stones) just north of the summit by the junction of the A356 with a minor road.
