= Chardown Hill =

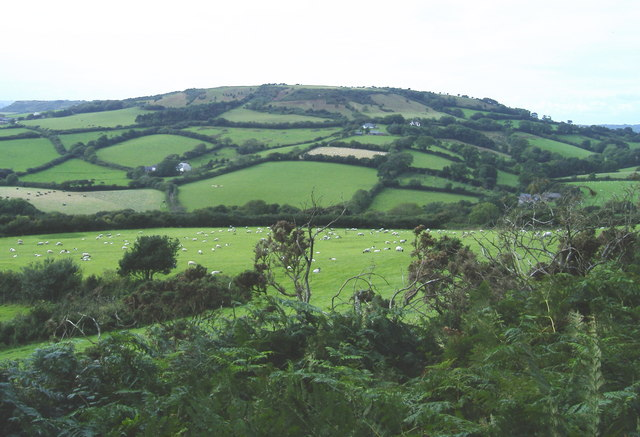
- Chardown Hill

Highest point
- Elevation: 194 m (636 ft)
- Prominence: 68 m (223 ft)
- Parent peak: Hardown Hill
- Listing: Tump
- Coordinates: 50°44′23″N 2°51′22″W

Geography
- Location: Dorset, England
- Parent range: South Dorset Downs
- OS grid: SY396936
- Topo map: OS Landranger 193

Chardown Hill is a prominent, rounded hill, 194 metres (636 ft) high, just to the southwest of the village of Morcombelake in the county of Dorset in southern England. It overlooks the Dorset coast around 1½ kilometres to the south. Its prominence of 63 metres (207 ft) means it is listed as one of the Tumps. It is located within the South Dorset Downs.

The summit area is open and crossed by a bridleway running roughly north to south. Just south of the actual summit it is joined by a public footpath approaching from Stonebarrow Hill, the western spur of Chardown. The South West Coast Path passed along the foot of Chardown Hill and above the coastal cliffs.
