= Marshwood Vale =

Coordinates: 50.7788°N 2.8306°W

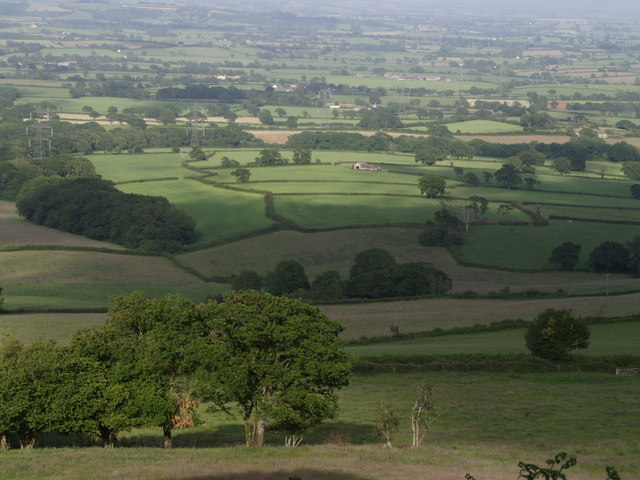
- Marshwood Vale viewed from Coney's Castle

- Location within Dorset
- OS grid reference: SY410980
- Unitary authority: Dorset
- Ceremonial county: Dorset
- Region: South West
- Country: England
- Sovereign state: United Kingdom
- Post town: Bridport
- Postcode district: DT6
- Police: Dorset
- Fire: Dorset and Wiltshire
- Ambulance: South Western
- UK Parliament: West Dorset

The Marshwood Vale (or Vale of Marshwood) is a low-lying, bowl-shaped valley of Lower Lias clay, in the western tip of the county of Dorset in south-west England. It lies to the north of the A35 trunk road between the towns of Bridport and Lyme Regis, and to the south of the two highest hills in Dorset, Lewesdon Hill (279m) and Pilsdon Pen (277m). It is drained by the River Char, which flows south-west to its mouth on the English Channel coast at Charmouth. All of the vale lies within the Dorset National Landscape area.

There is an electoral ward with the same name stretching from Whitchurch Canonicorum north to Thorncombe. The total population of this ward is 1,717.

== Landscape ==
The landscape of the vale is agricultural and consists of narrow lanes winding between farms that lie amongst small fields, old hedgerows, copses and ancient semi-natural woods. The vale is almost wholly surrounded by hills, including Lewesdon Hill (279 m), Dorset's county top, Pilsdon Pen (277 m), Dorset's second highest point and site of an Iron Age hill fort, Lambert's Castle Hill (258 m), also with an Iron Age hill fort and views across the vale, and Hardown Hill (207 m). The vale has escaped wholesale ploughing and large-scale agricultural intensification, leading to a landscape that still contains a wealth of wildlife.

== History ==
Farming existed in the vale at least as early as the Iron Age, with early farmers keeping livestock such as sheep and cattle and also cultivating crops such as barley and peas. Later in the Middle Ages these agricultural activities expanded and forest clearance increased; several of the farms in the vale have names ending in '-hay', which means 'enclosure', and these have their origins in the forest clearances from this time, as does the vale's irregular pattern of many small fields. In the 13th century Marshwood Castle was built on a site now occupied by Lodgehouse Farm. It was a motte and bailey construction but only earthworks remain today.

Due to the poorly-draining nature of its clay soil, until modern times the vale maintained a reputation for being difficult to traverse in wet weather. In 1906 Sir Frederick Treves called it "marshy and full of trees" and quoted the Dorset historian John Hutchins (1698 - 1773) who said it "was hardly passable by travellers but in dry summers", whilst in 1965 the Dorset-born agriculturalist and broadcaster Ralph Wightman remembered that in his boyhood in the early twentieth century "after months of hopeless winter rain .... little farms across the fields were cut off in desperate poverty and loneliness". Mains water and electricity didn't reach the vale until the second half of the 20th century, and ploughing with horses was still common in the 1960s.

== Settlements ==
Today a number of small villages and hamlets (Fishpond Bottom, Marshwood, Birdsmoorgate, Bettiscombe, Pilsdon, Bowood, Broadoak, Ryall and Whitchurch Canonicorum) surround the vale, sited mostly on the hills and higher ground which virtually encircle it. The impervious clay soil of the floor of the vale has historically provided less amenable sites for building, and only supports a few scattered farms.

The village of Whitchurch Canonicorum is the largest settlement connected to the vale, and is notable for its church, which has the rare distinction (shared with few other churches) of possessing the bodily remains of the saint to which it is dedicated (St. Wite or St. Wita, in this case). Pilgrims to this shrine stopped to refresh themselves at the thirteenth-century inn which still stands a couple of miles to the north in the centre of the vale, and folklore recounts that this is why thereafter the inn became known as the "Shave Cross Inn", after the shaved heads of its pious guests.

The village which shares its name with the vale, Marshwood, stands on the line of hills to the north, and from the churchyard the whole vale can be viewed to the south, with the coastal hills and the English Channel beyond.
