= Marshwood and Powerstock Vales =

Natural region in southwest England

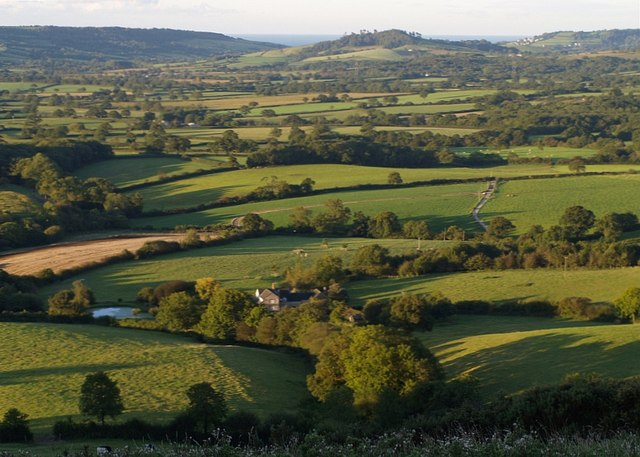
Marshwood Vale and Conegar Hill

The Marshwood and Powerstock Vales form a natural region in southwest England reaching to the Dorset coastline.

The region is recognised as a National Character Area (No. 139) by Natural England, the UK Government's advisors on the natural environment. It covers an area of 15,945 hectares (61.56 sq mi) and lies entirely within the Dorset AONB. The boundary of the Marshwood and Powerstock Vales NCA runs along the coastline from just east of Charmouth to West Bay, cutting briefing inland towards Bridport before heading eastwards again to Chilcombe. It then runs broadly north-northeast, taking in Eggardon Hill, before reaching the A356 near Toller Porcorum. It then heads westwards towards Mapperton, Beaminster and Stoke Abbott before swinging in a wide arc to return to the coast via Pilsdon and Whitchurch Canonicorum.

The heart of the region is the clay bowl of the Vale of Marshwood surrounded by Upper Greensand ridges and hills with a deeply incised network of valleys, in the east forming the Powerstock Hills - small, conical hills divided by deep valleys. To the north, a broad plateau overlooks the valley of the River Axe and separates the region from the Yeovil Scarplands. To the east are the chalk hills of the Dorset Downs and Cranborne Chase, and the coastal strip of the Weymouth Lowlands, and, to the west, the Greensand transitions into the Blackdowns. Lastly, to the south is Lyme Bay on the English Channel where the coastline is characterised by slumped, mobile cliffs, prominent headlands like Golden Cap, and hidden valleys.

The major watercourses of the region are the River Brit and the River Char.
