= Hardown Hill =

Hill in Dorset, England

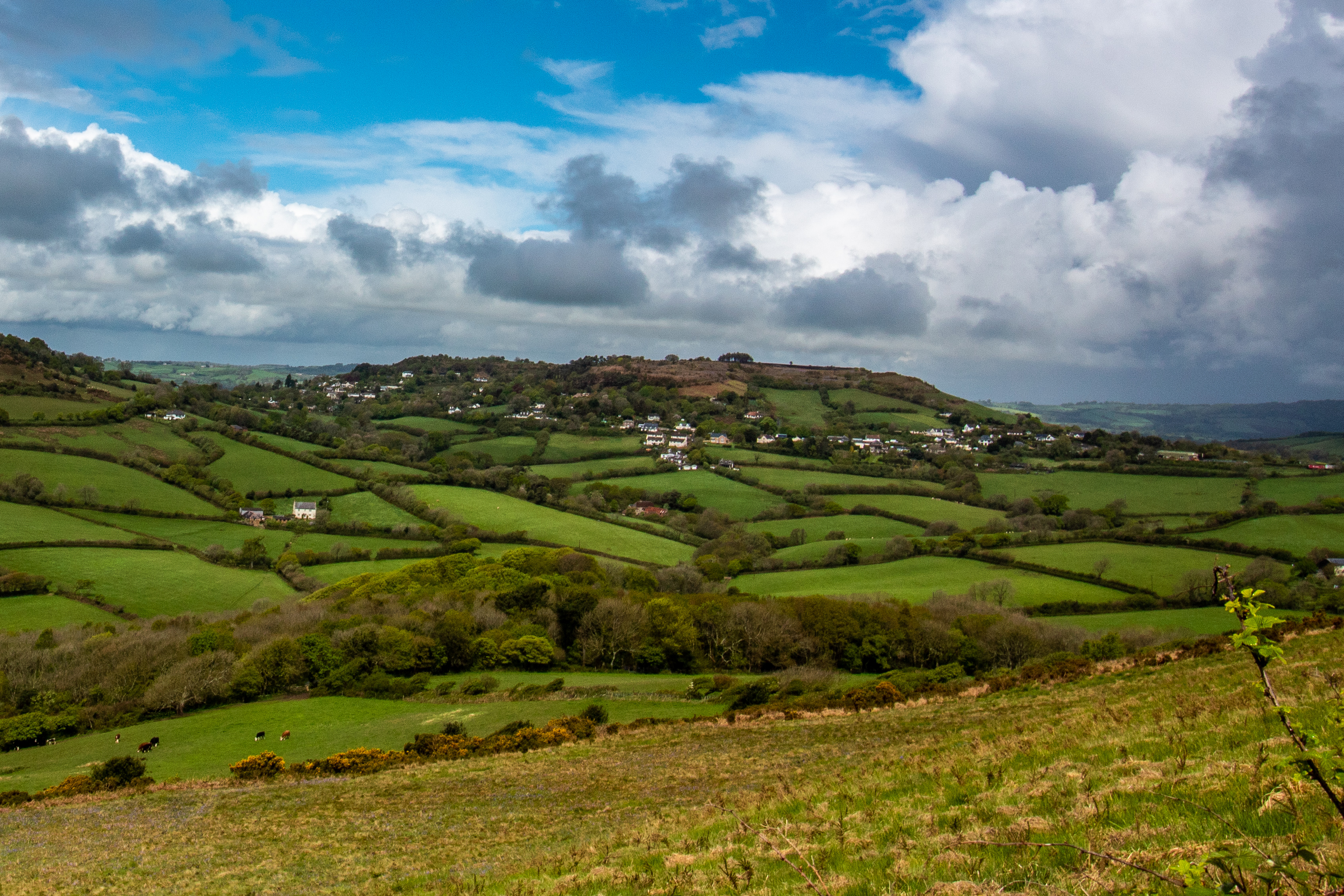
- Hardown Hill from the south near Golden Cap

Highest point
- Elevation: 207 m (679 ft)
- Prominence: 154 m (505 ft)
- Parent peak: Lewesdon Hill
- Listing: Marilyn
- Coordinates: 50°44′47.88″N 2°50′32.84″W

Geography
- Location: Dorset, England
- Parent range: Marshwood and Powerstock Vales
- OS grid: ST405942
- Topo map(s): OS Landranger 193; Explorer 116

Hardown Hill (207 metres, 679 feet high) is a hill between Ryall and Morcombelake in the county of Dorset, England. It rises west of the South Dorset Downs, close to the Dorset coast, and overlooks the Marshwood Vale to the north. Its prominence qualifies it as one of Dorset's four Marilyns and it is listed as one of the "top 12 Dorset views to take your breath away" by Dorset's official tourist website.

The hill lies about 6 kilometres west of Bridport and about 500 metres north of the A 35 road. It is not nearly as well known as its southern extremity, Golden Cap, which is a spectacular bluff on the coast, 2 kilometres to the south. From the top of the hill, which is owned by the National Trust, there are impressive views that take in Thorncombe Beacon, Chardown Hill, Quarry Hill and Langdon Hill.

There is a group of ten barrows, mostly covered in gorse and bracken, about 300 metres north of the summit above the hamlet of Ryall. These barrows are thought to be of disc and bowl form, likely dating to the Bronze Age. Wyatt Wingrave excavated fifteen artefacts dating to the Early Middle Ages in 1916, which he interpreted as the associated objects of an early Anglo-Saxon inhumation burial. No skeletal remains were found, and it is not clear which of the barrows was excavated. Vera Evison later reinterpreted the assemblage as a group of Anglo-Saxon burials that represented secondary interments in a Bronze Age barrow. A recent consideration of the context and a reclassification of the artefacts has cast doubts on the burial interpretation, and has instead interpreted the assemblage as a hoard.

== Gallery ==
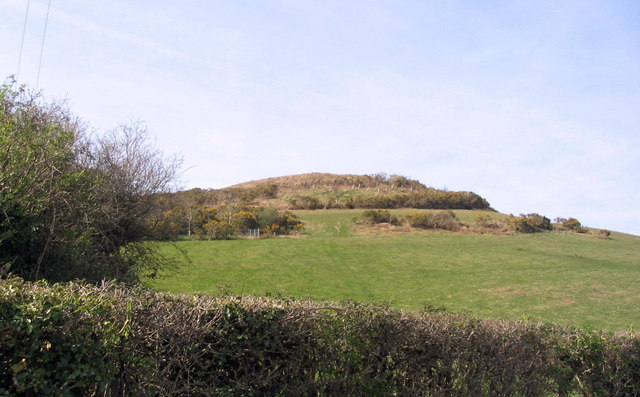
Hardown Hill from the road to Ryall

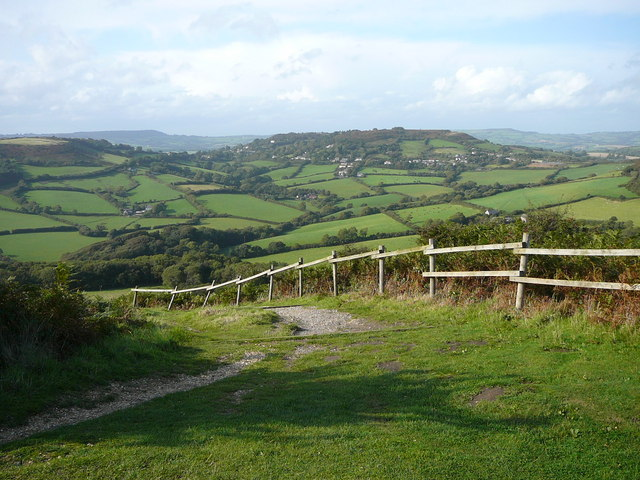
Hardown Hill and the village of Morcombelake from Golden Cap

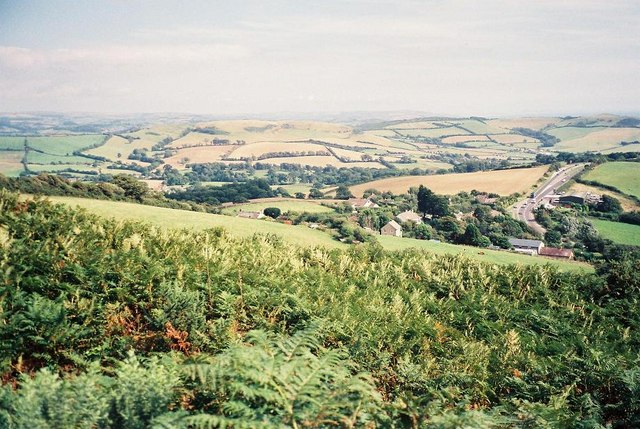
View from Hardown Hill looking east with the A35 on the right

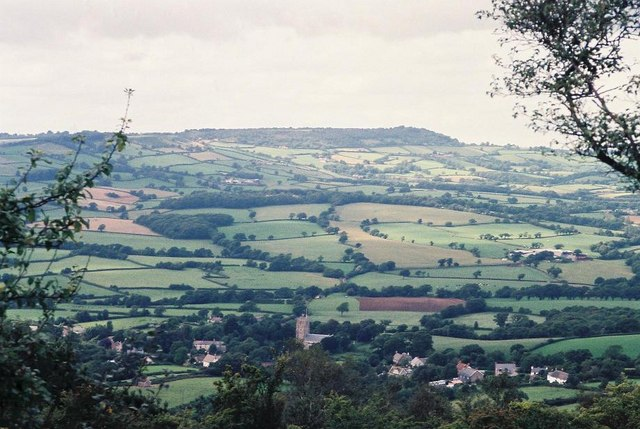
View from Hardown Hill looking northwest over Whitechurch Canonicorum

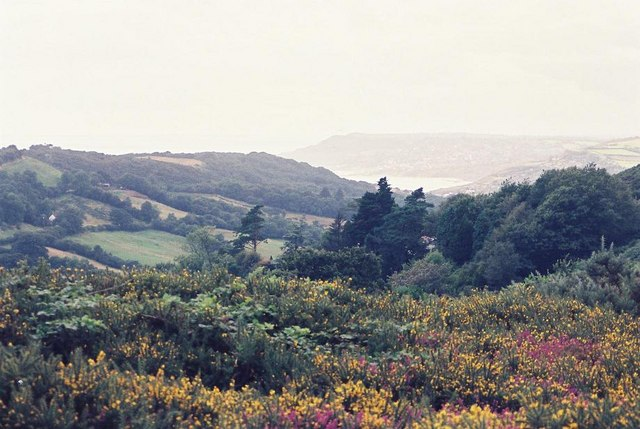
View from Hardown Hill looking west towards the Dorset coast

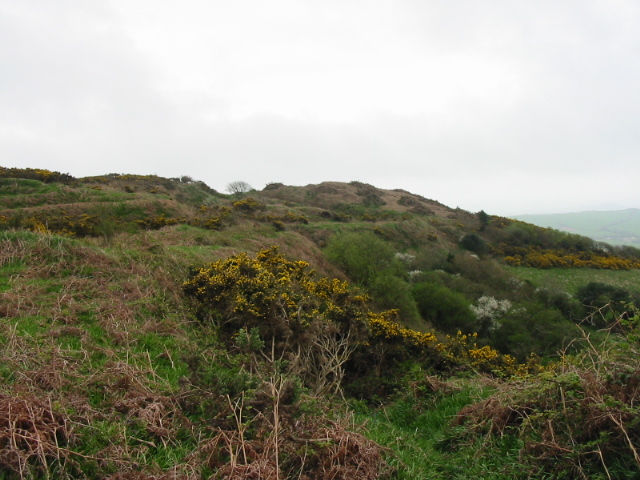
Summit area of Hardown Hill
