= Portesham =

Village and civil parish in Dorset, England

Coordinates: 50°40′15″N 2°33′52″W

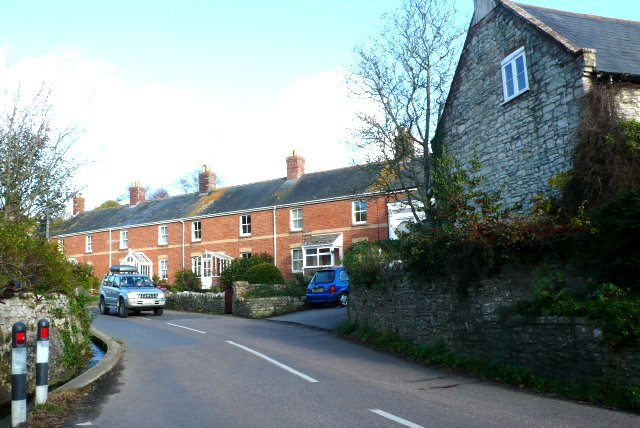
- Portesham

- Location within Dorset
- Population: 685
- OS grid reference: SY602858
- Unitary authority: Dorset
- Ceremonial county: Dorset
- Region: South West
- Country: England
- Sovereign state: United Kingdom
- Post town: WEYMOUTH
- Postcode district: DT3
- Dialling code: 01305
- Police: Dorset
- Fire: Dorset and Wiltshire
- Ambulance: South Western
- UK Parliament: West Dorset

Portesham, sometimes also spelt Portisham, is a village and civil parish in the county of Dorset in southwest England, situated in the Dorset Council administrative area approximately 6 miles (10 km) northwest of Weymouth, 6 miles (10 km) southwest of the county town Dorchester, and 2 miles (3 km) northeast of the Jurassic Coast World Heritage Site at Chesil Beach. The parish is quite large, covering several outlying hamlets and what were once their manors. In the 2011 census it had a population of 685 in 316 households and 342 dwellings.

== Description ==
In 1905 Sir Frederick Treves described the village's site as being "in a hollow among the downs" so that it was "too low to command a view of the sea", but nevertheless "in a south-westerly gale the roar of the breakers on the Chesil Beach can be heard in the village." The houses in Portesham comprise a mix of old grey stone cottages and more modern buildings in various styles. A stream runs alongside the main street.

== History ==
The area around Portesham is rich in prehistoric remains. On the hills to the north of the village are several Bronze Age barrows and a Neolithic chambered long barrow called the Hell Stone, which may have been used as a resting place for people awaiting burial in the nearby Valley of Stones.

In 1024 Portesham was granted as a manor by King Canute, firstly to one of his servants, and then to the monastery of Abbotsbury. In 1086 at the time of the Domesday Book the village had 34 households, 24 acres (9.7 ha) of meadow and 9 ploughlands. It was in Uggescombe Hundred and the lords and tenants-in-chief were Abbotsbury Abbey and Hawise, wife of Hugh son of Grip.

At the Dissolution of the Monasteries the manor was granted to William Paulet, Lord St. John. It was later held by the Trenchards and then the Ricards, before coming to John, Lord Berkeley of Stratton by marriage.

Running through the parish is an outcrop of Purbeck limestone, which was formerly quarried. Portesham quarry operated in the 19th and early 20th centuries, producing stone that was used in domestic and ecclesiastical buildings within the local area, including Abbotsbury Abbey. A limekiln was sited within the quarry.

A week-long fair was held in early August every year in Portesham until the First World War. Known as "Possum Fes' Wik", the event included all-night dancing.

Portesham had a railway station sited across fields to the south of the village, on a branch line between Abbotsbury (the neighbouring village to the west) and Upwey (between Dorchester and Weymouth). The line and station closed in 1952.

Portesham has one public house (Kings Arms) and one shop (Ducks Farm Shop), a combined farm shop and cafe.

== Governance ==
Portesham is in the Chesil Bank electoral ward, which also includes the neighbouring settlements of Abbotsbury, Litton Cheney and Rodden. The total ward population at the 2011 census was 2,094. The ward is one of 32 that comprise the West Dorset parliamentary constituency, which is currently represented in the UK national parliament by Edward Morello, a Liberal Democrat.

== Vice-Admiral Hardy ==
Captain Thomas Hardy, one of Lord Nelson's commanders at the Battle of Trafalgar, lived in the village. He was born a few miles away at Kingston Russell House, lived in Portesham as a boy, and again as an older man at Portesham House. He affectionately referred to the village as "Possum" and is commemorated by the Hardy Monument, a tower 21 metres (69 ft) high, erected above the village in 1844 on the top of Black Down and visible over half the county.

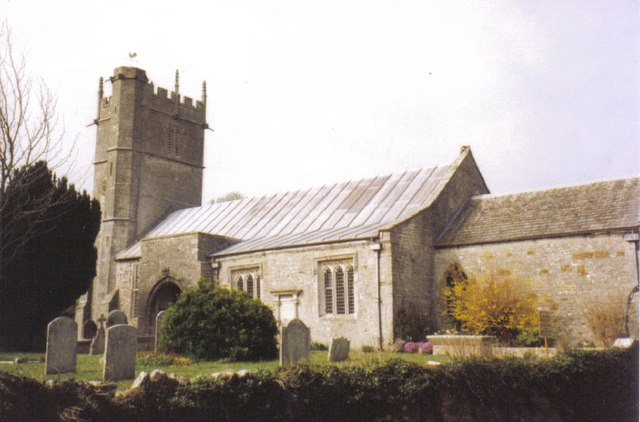
Parish church of St Peter

== Parish church ==
The parish church of St Peter is part of the Dorset Wildlife Trust's "Living Churchyard Project" and manages the churchyard for the benefit of wildlife. The grass remains uncut at times, to allow wild flowers to flourish: more than 70 species have been identified. In 2011 the church won Best New Entry in the Living Churchyards competition, and was runner-up in this category in 2012. In 2013 it won the Bishop's Prize.

In 1897, the 13th century St Bartholomew's Chapel at Corton was consecrated as a chapel of ease to St Peter's.
