= Hardy Monument =

Monument in Dorset, England

Coordinates: 50°41′12.39″N 2°32′57.1″W

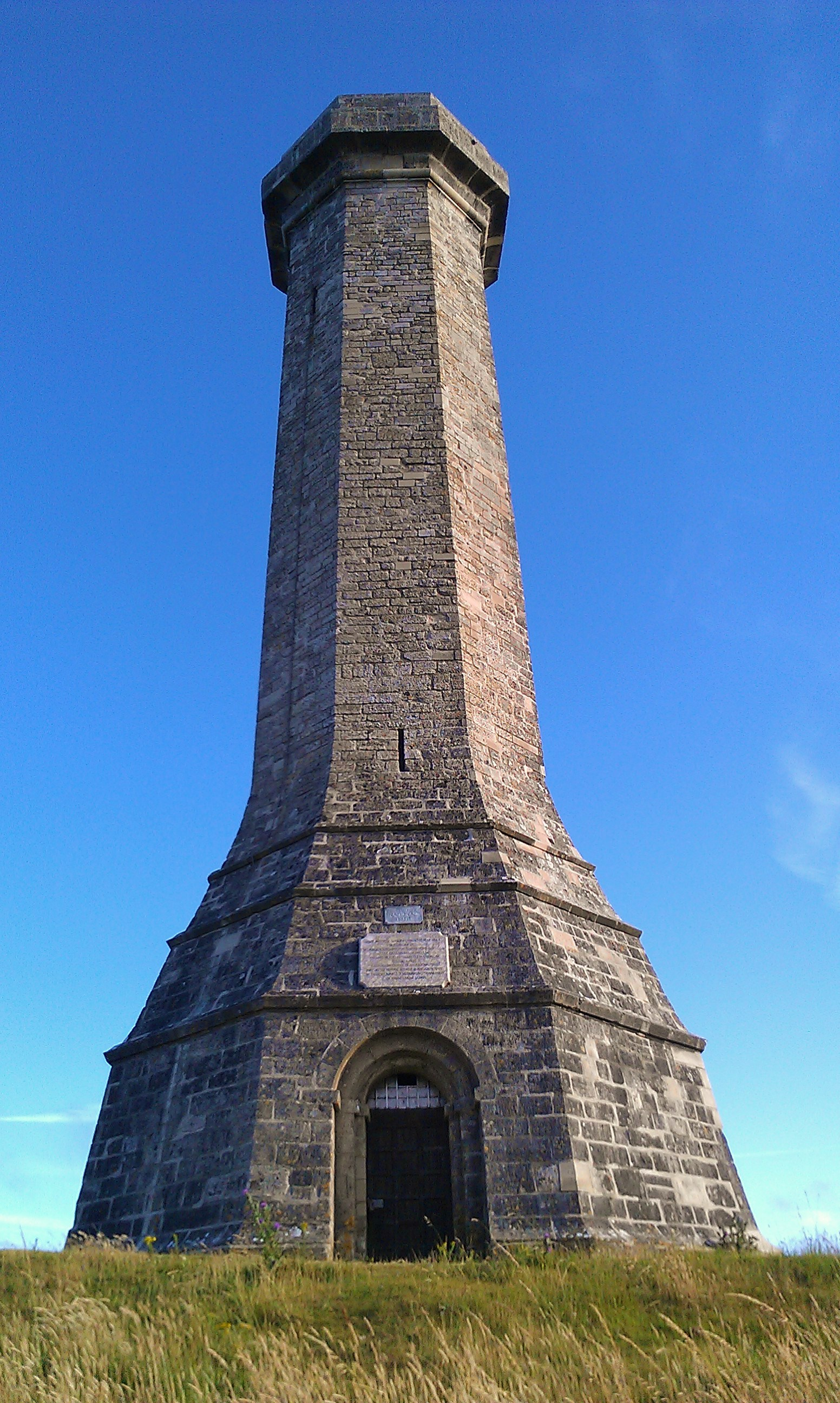
The Hardy Monument from the front

The Hardy Monument (sometimes referred to as Hardy's Monument) is a 72-foot-high (22 m) monument on the summit of Black Down near Portesham in Dorset. It was erected in 1844 by public subscription in memory of Vice Admiral Sir Thomas Hardy, flag captain of Admiral Lord Nelson at the Battle of Trafalgar. It has been owned by National Trust since 1938, when it was bought for £15, and is regularly opened for visitors can climb the 120 steps to the viewpoint at the top.

Admiral Hardy lived in Portesham and his family owned the Portesham estate which stretched from the middle of Portesham to Black Down. The site for the monument, a hill overlooking the English Channel, was chosen because the Hardy family wanted a monument which could be used as a landmark for shipping. The monument has been shown on navigational charts since 1846 and is visible from a distance of at least 9 miles (14 km).

The monument was designed to look like a spyglass, as Admiral Hardy would have used on board ship. Its eight corners are aligned with the compass points. Viewed from the ground the corner to the right of the lightning conductor points due south. The bench mark on the northwest face denotes the altitude of Black Down at 780 feet (240 m).

From the top of the monument at a height of 850 feet (260 m) above sea level it is possible on a clear day to see the coast from Start Point, Devon to St. Catherine's Point on the Isle of Wight, both of which are 56 miles (90 km) distant. To the north can be seen Pen Hill in the Mendip Hills which is 38 miles (61 km) away.

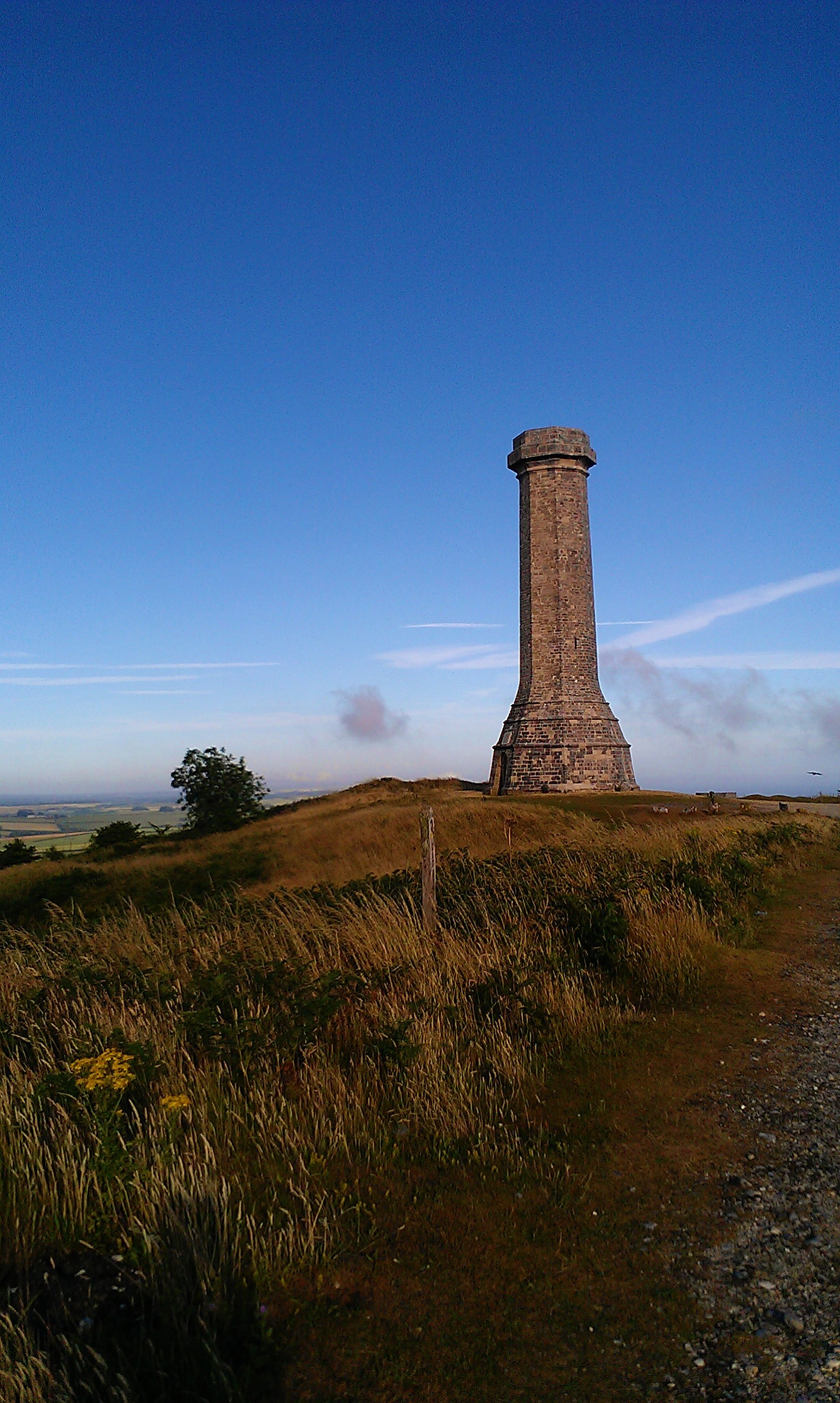
The Hardy Monument from the west

The monument was designated as a grade II listed building in 1956. It has had several major renovations during its history. It was restored in 1900 by Hardy's descendants, and again by the National Trust in 2009-12.

Adjacent to the monument is a stone seat erected in memory of Lt Col William Digby Oswald who was killed on the Somme in 1916.

== Geodesy ==
The Hardy Monument was the origin (meridian) of the 6 inch and 1:2500 Ordnance Survey maps for Somerset and Dorset.
