= Black Down, Dorset =

Black Down
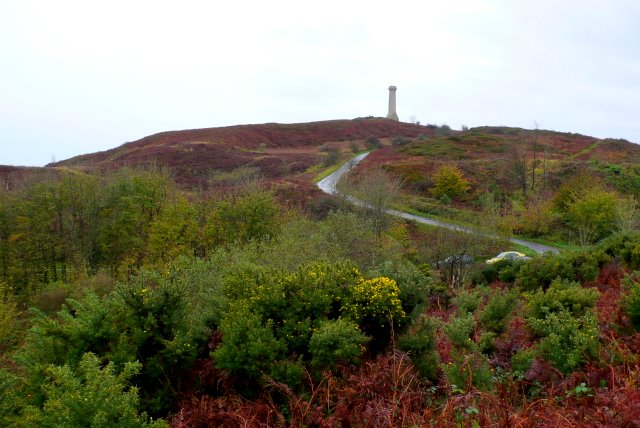
- Black Down and the Hardy Monument

Highest point
- Elevation: 242 m (794 ft)
- Prominence: 78 m (256 ft)
- Parent peak: Lewesdon Hill
- Listing: Tump (hill)
- Coordinates: 50.687°N 2.551°W

Geography
- Location: Dorset, England
- Parent range: South Dorset Downs
- OS grid: SY611876
- Topo map: OS Landranger 194

Black Down is a hill on the South Dorset Ridgeway about 1.2 miles (2 km) north-northeast of the village of Portesham in the county of Dorset, England and around 3.1 miles (5 km) from the coast.

The treeless summit of Black Down is a popular viewing point, crowned by the 72 foot (22 m) high Hardy Monument built in 1844 in memory of Vice-Admiral Sir Thomas Masterman Hardy who was Admiral Nelson's Flag Captain at the Battle of Trafalgar.

From the top there are views of the Fleet and Chesil Beach as well as the South Dorset Downs. On a fine day The Needles may be visible, some 50 miles away.

The site is owned by the National Trust.

The heathland area around the monument was in 1984 designated a Site of Special Scientific Interest, when the Nature Conservancy Council decided that the geology of the area was very rare.

== Geology ==
Geologically, Black Down is the western tip of the Bagshot gravel beds. The gravel beds extend to the east as far as London.

The ground around the monument is pitted with various holes and craters. Many of these are dolines or swallow holes. These are formed when rain falls on the highly acidic topsoil. The water increases in acidity as it percolates through the topsoil then dissolves the underlying chalk. Eventually there is nothing but topsoil above the caverns so formed and the familiar shape of a doline is created when the topsoil collapses into the cavern beneath. Dolines are usually shaped like a teardrop cut in half vertically and laid down horizontally. Within 1,000 m (1,100 yd) of the monument there are three dolines which were formed by the chalk being dissolved in a vertical fissure in its structure. These dolines are vertically sided and are shaped like wells. The two which opened up in 1956 are some 100 m (330 ft) deep. The one which opened in 2006 is not quite vertical and its depth is unknown.

== Gallery ==
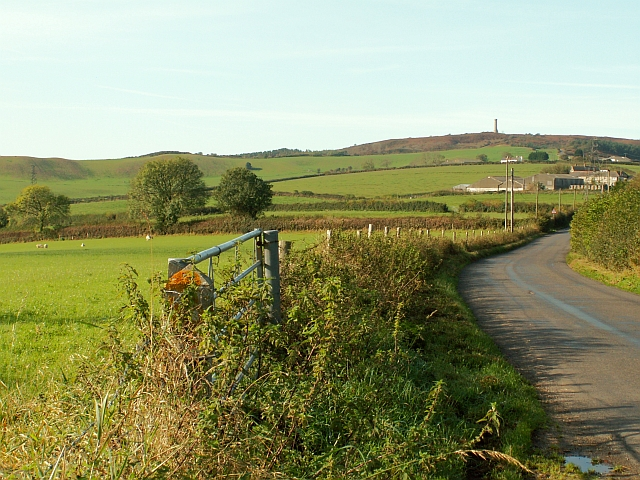
Road from Martinstown to Black Down (far right)
