= Beaminster Down =

Hill in Dorset, England

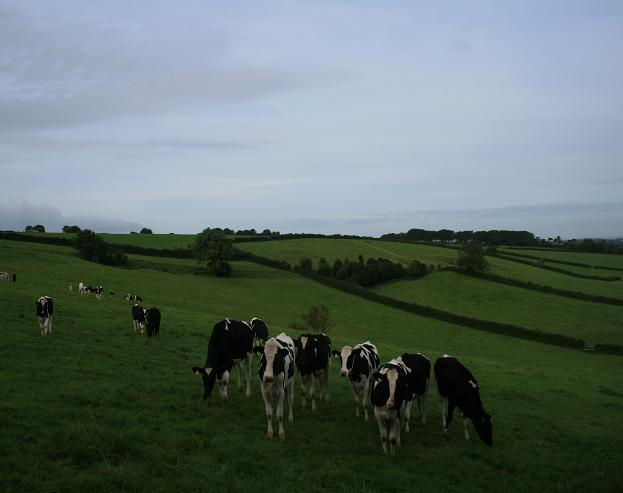
- Beaminster Down viewed from the Monarch's Way looking southwest

Highest point
- Elevation: 244 m (801 ft)
- Listing: Hills of Dorset
- Coordinates: 50°49′42″N 2°43′02″W

Geography
- Location within Dorset
- Location: Dorset, England
- Parent range: Dorset Downs
- OS grid: ST493033
- Topo map: OS Landranger No. 194

At 244 metres, Beaminster Down is one of the highest hills in West Dorset, England.

== Location ==
Beaminster Down is common land on the Dorset Downs and overlooks the steep scarp slope above the town of Beaminster, which is about a mile and a half to the southwest. The hill is crossed by two long-distance trails, two minor roads and several other tracks.

== History ==
There is evidence of prehistoric settlement on in the form of tumuli to the northeast. Grenade practice took place in the sandbagged, zig-zag trenches on Beaminster Down during the Second World War.
