= Corscombe =

Village and civil parish in Dorset, England

Coordinates: 50.8465°N 2.6864°W

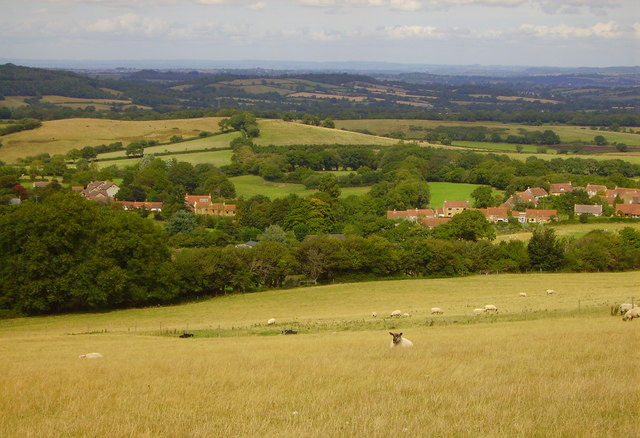
- Corscombe village

- Location within Dorset
- Population: 445
- OS grid reference: ST518053
- Unitary authority: Dorset
- Ceremonial county: Dorset
- Region: South West
- Country: England
- Sovereign state: United Kingdom
- Post town: Dorchester
- Postcode district: DT2
- Police: Dorset
- Fire: Dorset and Wiltshire
- Ambulance: South Western
- UK Parliament: West Dorset
- Website: corscombe.org.uk

Corscombe is a village and civil parish in the English county of Dorset, in the Dorset Council administrative area. The parish includes the small settlements of Benville and Toller Whelme to the south and in the 2011 census had a population of 445.

Corscombe village is sited "into hollows and along sunken lanes" on the northern scarp slope of the Dorset Downs, approximately 8 miles (13 km) south-south-west from the town of Yeovil in Somerset. Evidence of early human occupation within the parish includes lynchets and, south of the village, three standing stones.

On the higher ground in the village stands the 15th-century parish church of St. Mary, which was restored in 1875–7. In 1905 Sir Frederick Treves described the church as a "handsome building" with an "exceedingly fine" situation. Nearby Corscombe Court dates from the 13th century and is partially surrounded by a moat. It has a 15th-century tithe barn which was once used by the monks of Sherborne Abbey.

About 2 kilometres to the south of Corscombe village, across the A356, is Toller Down, one of the highest hills in Dorset, with good views of the surrounding countryside.

The musician Polly Jean Harvey is a former resident.
