= River Char =

River in Dorset, England

Coordinates: 50°44′N 2°53′W

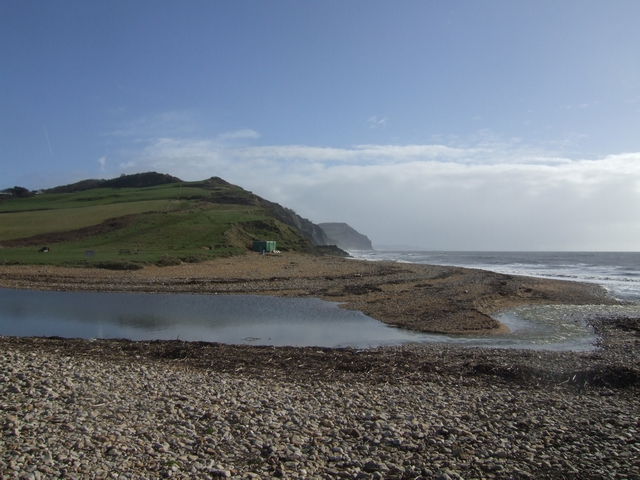
River Char at Charmouth

The River Char is a river in Dorset. The Char runs a few miles from Bettiscombe to Charmouth, passing Pilsdon and Whitchurch Canonicorum.
