= Blackdown Hill, Dorset =

Blackdown Hill
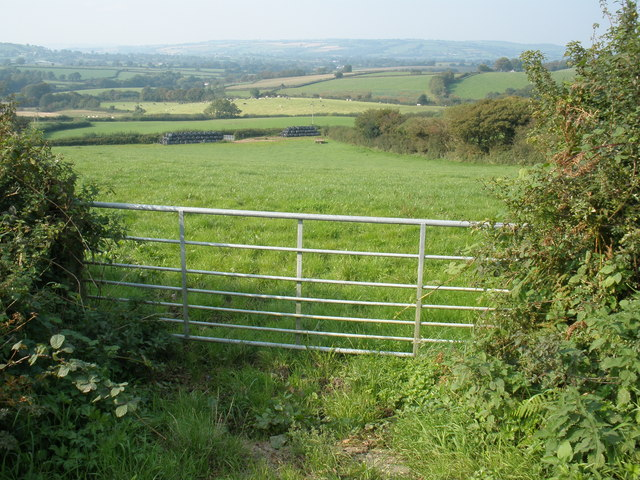
- Pasture land, north of the B3164 with Blackdown Hill in the far distance.

Highest point
- Elevation: 215 m (705 ft)
- Prominence: 34 m (112 ft)
- Parent peak: Lewesdon Hill
- Listing: Tump
- Coordinates: 50°49′50″N 2°51′38″W

Geography
- Location: Dorset, England
- OS grid: ST395038
- Topo map: OS Landranger 193

Blackdown Hill is a prominent elevation, 215 metres (705 ft) high, 5 miles (8.0 km) south west of the town of Crewkerne, in the county of Dorset in the south west of England. Its prominence of 34 metres (112 ft) means it is listed as one of the Tumps. It runs parallel to the B3165 towering over the village of Blackdown and hamlet of Kittwhistle at the foot of the eastern flanks of the ridge.

The open summit of the hill lies at the northern end of a mile-long north-south ridge. The Jubilee Trail runs along the ridge line initially before dropping just below it to the west and then descending steeply down Venn Hill, a northwestern spur of Blackdown, towards the village of Thorncombe on the far side of the River Synderford that runs past the foot of Blackdown Hill to the west. Pilsdon Pen (277 m), formerly thought to be Dorset's highest point, lies about 2 miles (3.2 km) to the south east. To the east is the Temple Brook which rises north of the col between Blackdown and Pilsdon Pen.
