= Yeovil Scarplands =

Natural region of southern England

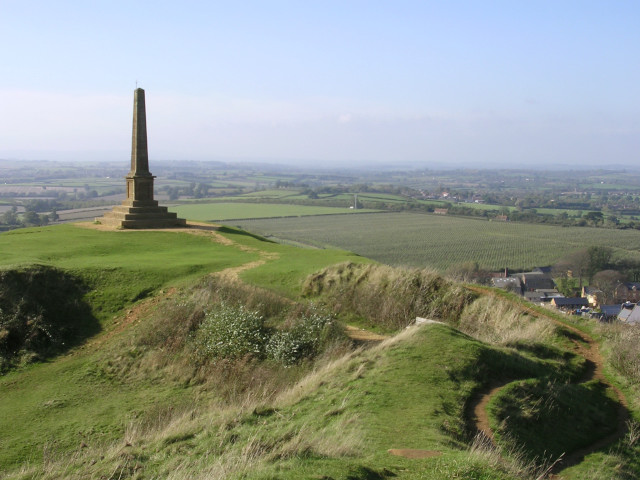
Hamdon Hill

The Yeovil Scarplands are a natural region in southern England in the counties of Somerset and Dorset.

The region is listed as National Character Area 140 by Natural England, the UK Government's advisor on the natural environment. It covers 78,579 hectares (303.40 sq mi) and runs from Chard in the southwest to Chesterblade and Upton Noble in the northeast. The town of Yeovil lies roughly in the centre of the area. To the west are the Blackdowns and the Vale of Taunton and Quantock Fringes, to the north are the Mid Somerset Hills and the Mendips, to the east are the Blackmoor Vale and Vale of Wardour and to the south, the Marshwood and Powerstock Vales and Dorset Downs.

With a predominantly rural landscape, Yeovil and other urban areas occupying less than 5% of the area, about 85% is farmed and the remainder predominantly pastoral. The area is drained by several rivers including: River Axe, River Brue, River Cary, River Isle, River Parrett, River Yeo and the Whitelake River.

The area includes Neolithic hill forts, remains of Roman villas and many listed buildings. The area also includes 9477 ha of the Area of Outstanding Natural Beauty.

== Designated Areas and Listed Buildings ==
The NCA includes some or all of:

- Bracket's Coppice SAC
- West Dorset Alder Woods SAC
- Hardington Moor NNR
- Horn Park Quarry NNR
- A total of 30 Sites of Special Scientific Interest (SSSI) wholly or partly within the NCA including Rampisham Down
- 31 Local Geological Sites
- 7 Active Limestone Quarries including 2 at Ham Hill
- 4386 ha of woodland of which 1251 ha is ancient woodland with over 70% being Broadleaved.
- 13 Registered Parks and Gardens
- 74 Scheduled Monuments. Some of the oldest are Neolithic, Bronze Age or Iron Age including hill forts, such as Kenwalch's Castle and Bowl barrows. The Romano-British period is represented with several sites including the Low Ham Roman Villa which included an extensive mosaic floor, now on display in the Museum of Somerset. Religious sites are represented by Muchelney Abbey, which was founded in the 7th or 8th century, and Montacute Priory, a Cluniac priory of the Benedictine order, from the 11th. More recent sites include several motte-and-bailey castles such as Cary Castle, and church crosses which date from the Middle Ages. Several packhorse bridges, such as Bow Bridge, Plox also appear in the list. The most recent monuments include the Round House, a village lock-up in Castle Cary dating from 1779.
- 4317 Listed Buildings including Montacute House, Barrington Court & Tintinhull Court.
