= Golden Cap =

Hill and cliff in Dorset, England

Coordinates: 50°43′35.14″N 2°50′28.14″W

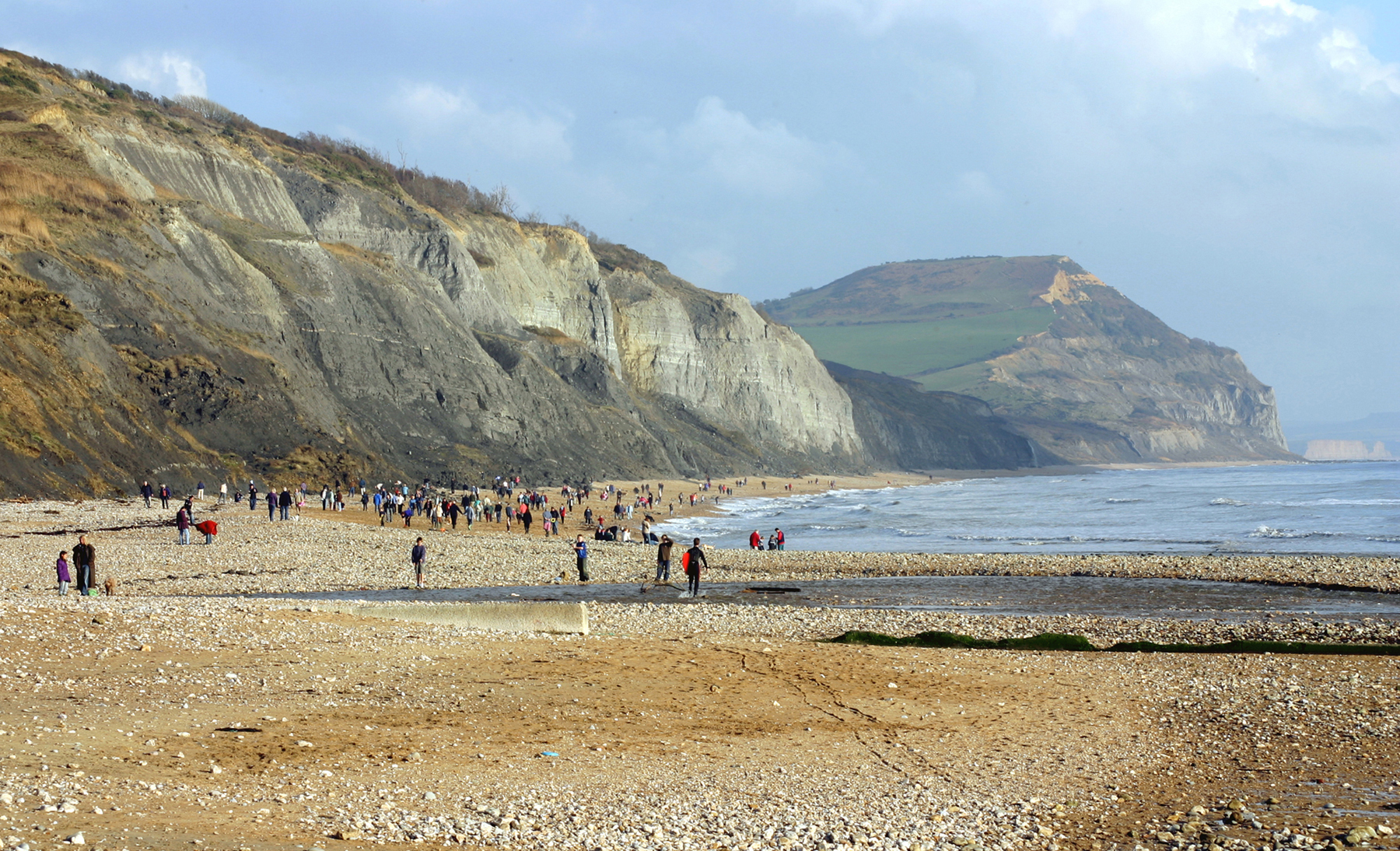
- Golden Cap seen from Charmouth beach

Highest point
- Elevation: 191 m (627 ft)
- Prominence: 63 m (207 ft)
- Parent peak: Hardown Hill

Geography
- Location: Dorset, England
- Parent range: South Dorset Downs
- OS grid: SY384934
- Topo map: OS Landranger 193

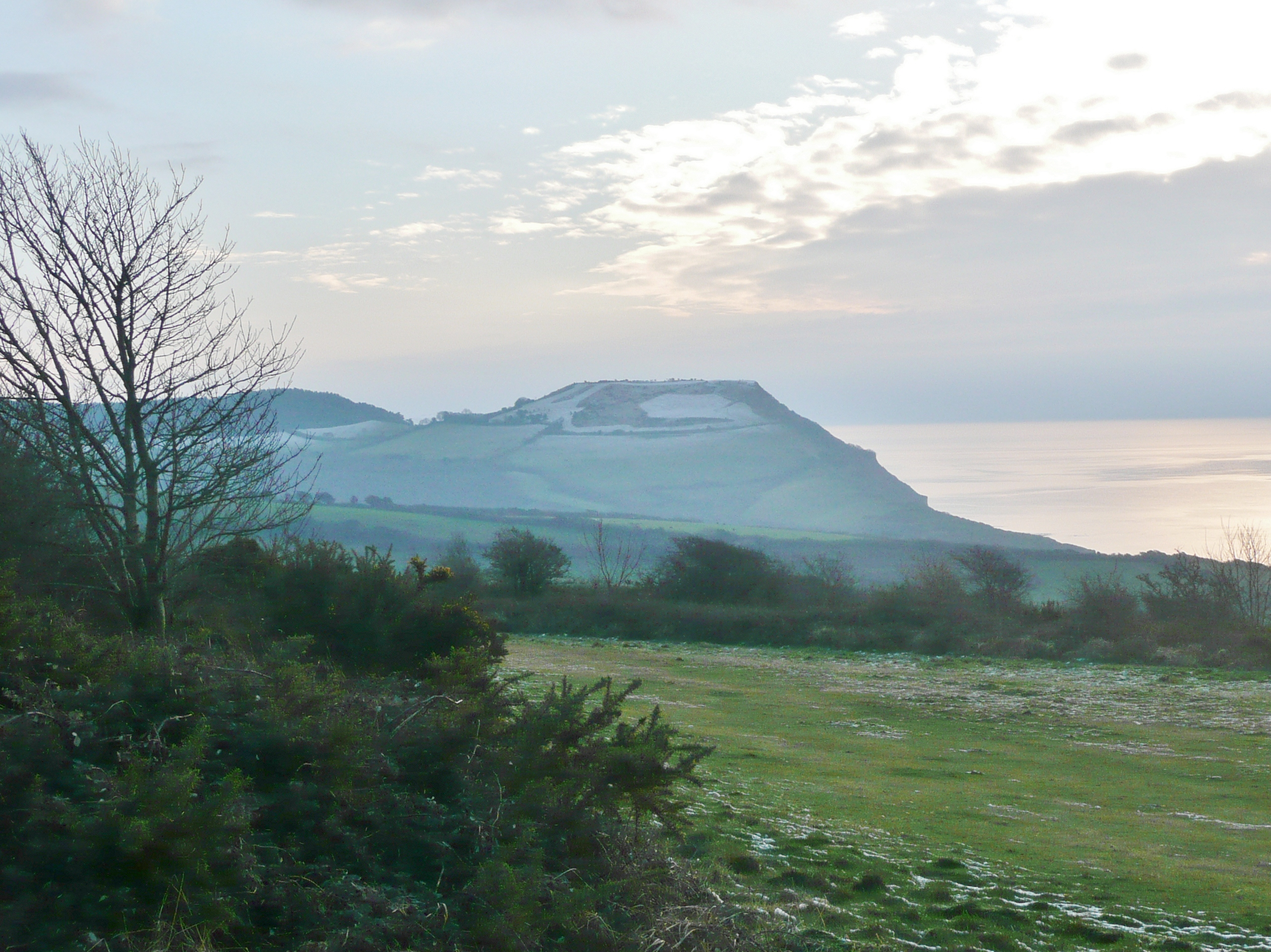
Golden Cap seen from Stonebarrow Hill in winter

Golden Cap is a hill and cliff situated on the English Channel coast between Bridport and Charmouth in Dorset, England. At 191 metres (627 ft), it is the highest point within a mile of the south coast of Great Britain (it is set back some 250 m (820 ft) from the coastline) and is visible for tens of miles along the coastline. It is accessible via a coastal footpath from Seatown, and takes around 40 minutes to reach the summit.

The hill is owned by the National Trust and forms part of the Jurassic Coast, a World Heritage Site.

The base of the cliff is covered with large boulders, and is popular with fossil collectors. Storms have previously exposed fossilised ammonites and belemnites in the Blue Lias base.

The name derives from the distinctive outcropping of golden greensand rock present at the very top of the cliff.

Behind the cliff is Langdon Wood, a small wood of mainly Corsican Pine, planted in the 1950s, whose trees originate from a nearby copse known as "Eleanor's Clump". Langdon is owned by the National Trust, and encompasses a circular walk of approximately one mile.

As a result of its height, on a clear day views can extend to Portland Bill and to Start Point Lighthouse and Dartmoor in Devon.
