= Pilsdon Pen =

Hill in Dorset, England

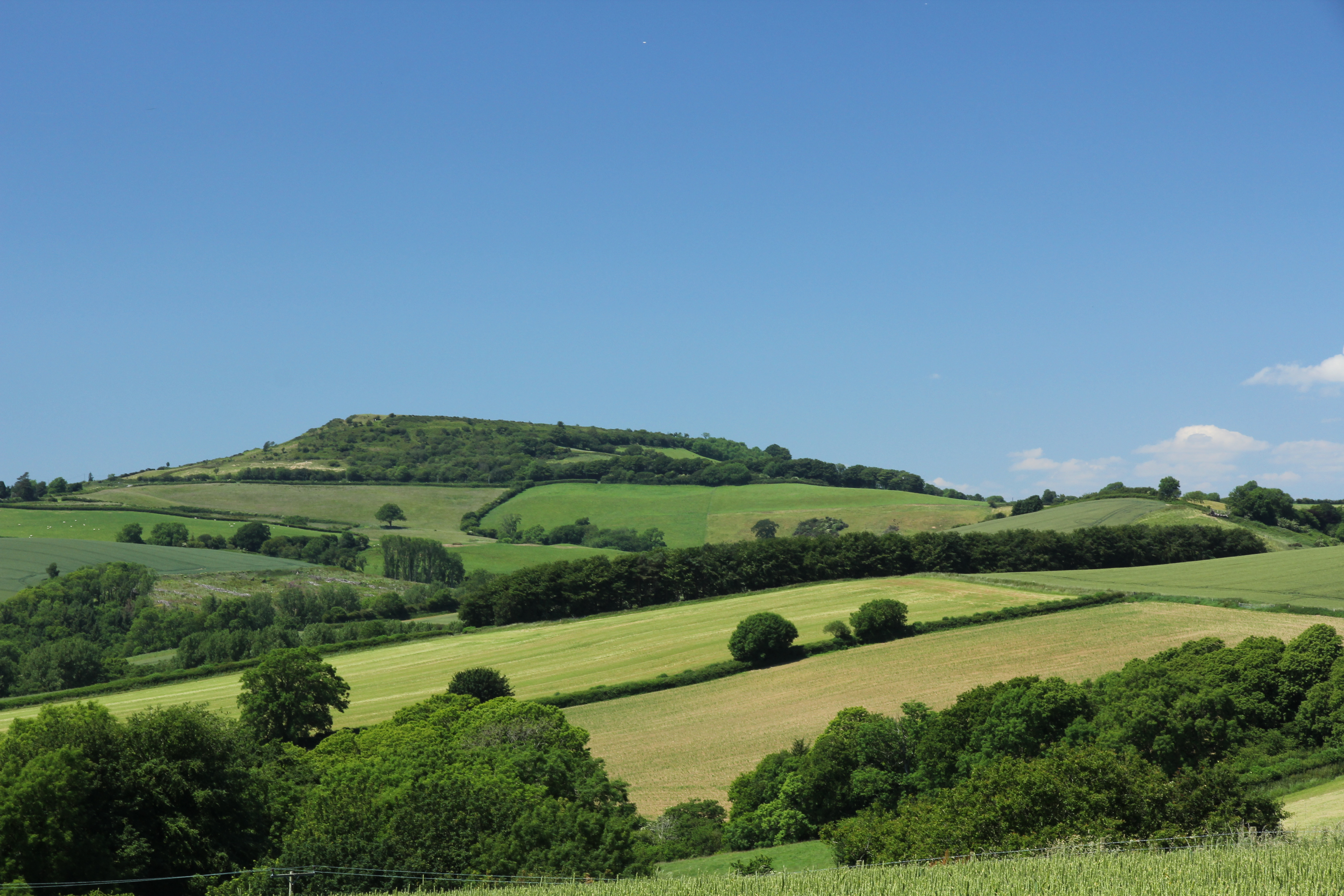
- Pilsdon Pen from the southeast

Highest point
- Elevation: 277 m (909 ft)
- Prominence: 83 m
- Listing: Tump
- Coordinates: 50.8065°N 2.8344°W

Geography
- Location: Dorset, England
- Parent range: Marshwood & Powerstock Vales
- OS grid: ST413011
- Topo map: OS Landranger 193

Climbing
- Easiest route: From the car park at Lob Gate

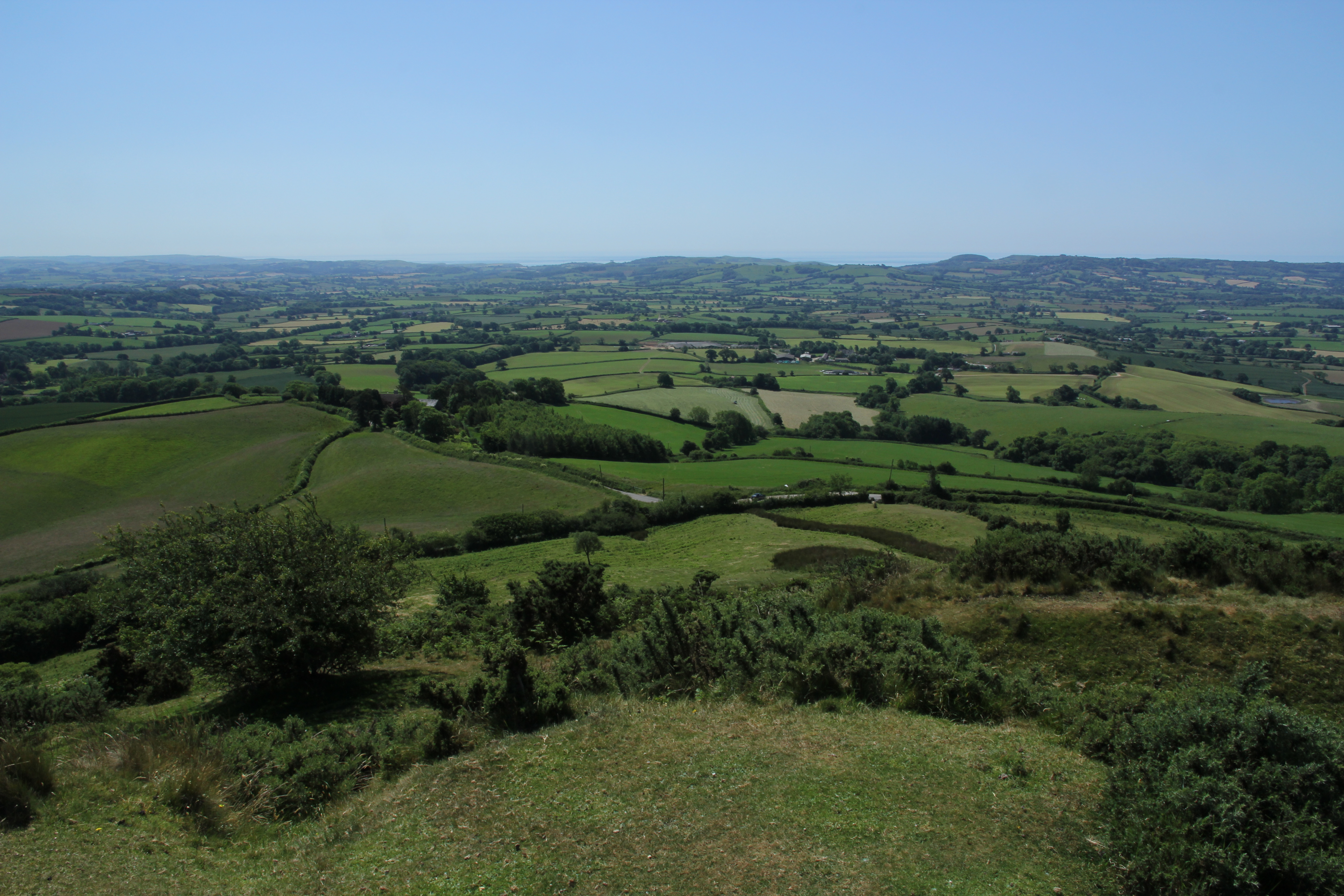
Looking south towards the Dorset coast and English Channel from Pilsdon Pen

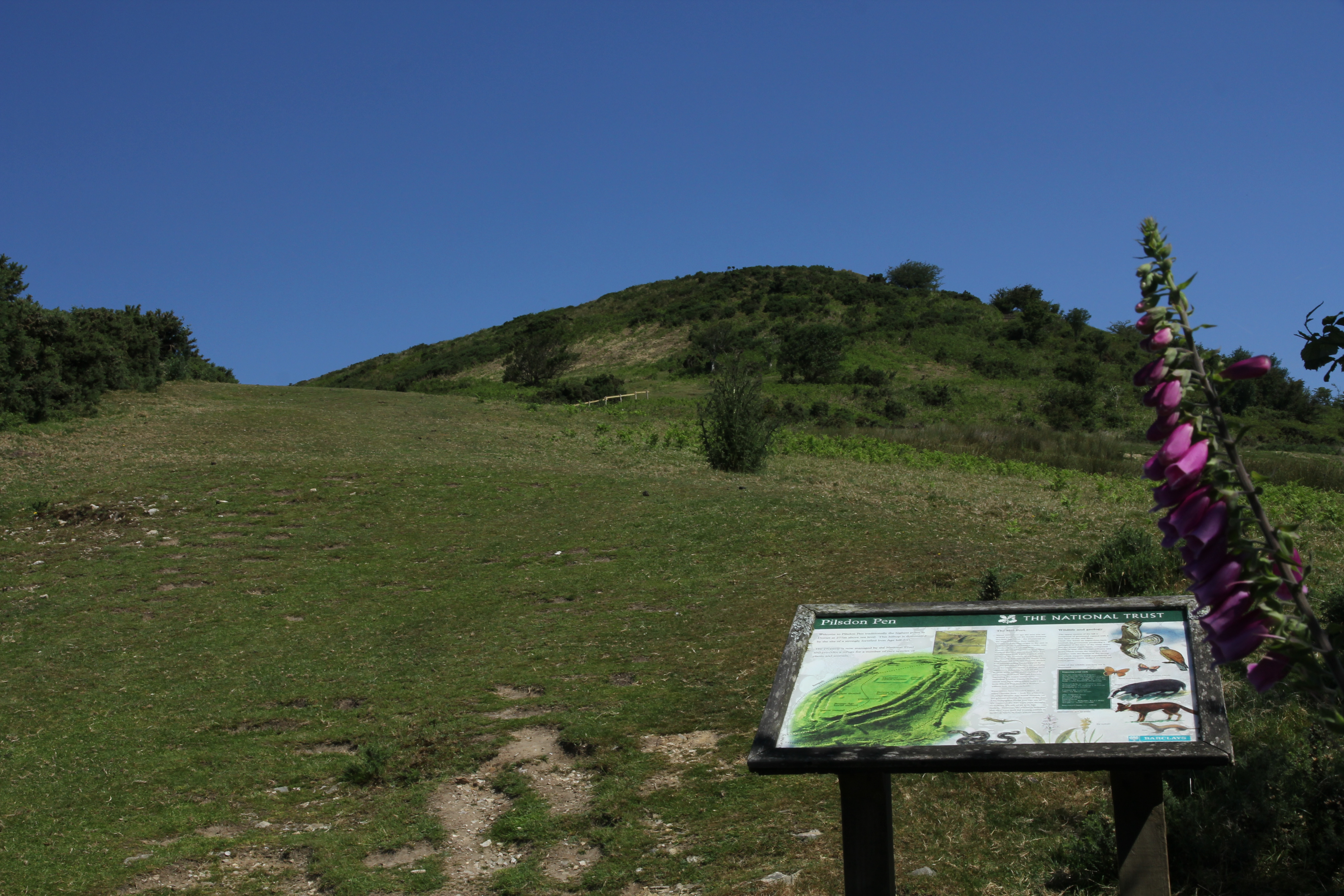
Pilsdon Pen from the information board by the road to the south

Pilsdon Pen is a 277-metre (909 ft) hill in Dorset in South West England, situated at the north end of the Marshwood Vale, approximately 4.5 miles (7.2 km) west of Beaminster. It is Dorset's second highest point and has panoramic views extending for many miles. It was bequeathed to the National Trust by the Pinney family in 1982. For many years it was thought to be Dorset's highest hill, until modern survey revealed that nearby Lewesdon Hill was 2 metres higher.

== Geology ==
The hill is a lower greensand Cretaceous outcrop situated amongst Jurassic strata of marl and clay, at the border between the chalk of South-East England and the granite of Devon and Cornwall.

== Archaeology ==
The hill is topped by an Iron Age multivallate Durotrigian hillfort which was excavated in the 1960s by Peter Gelling of the University of Birmingham with his wife Margaret Gelling at the request of the then owner, Michael Pinney. The remains of 14 roundhouses were uncovered near the centre of the hill fort. Surveys were also carried out by the National Trust in 1982, the Royal Commission on the Historical Monuments of England in 1995, and the University of Bournemouth in 2016.

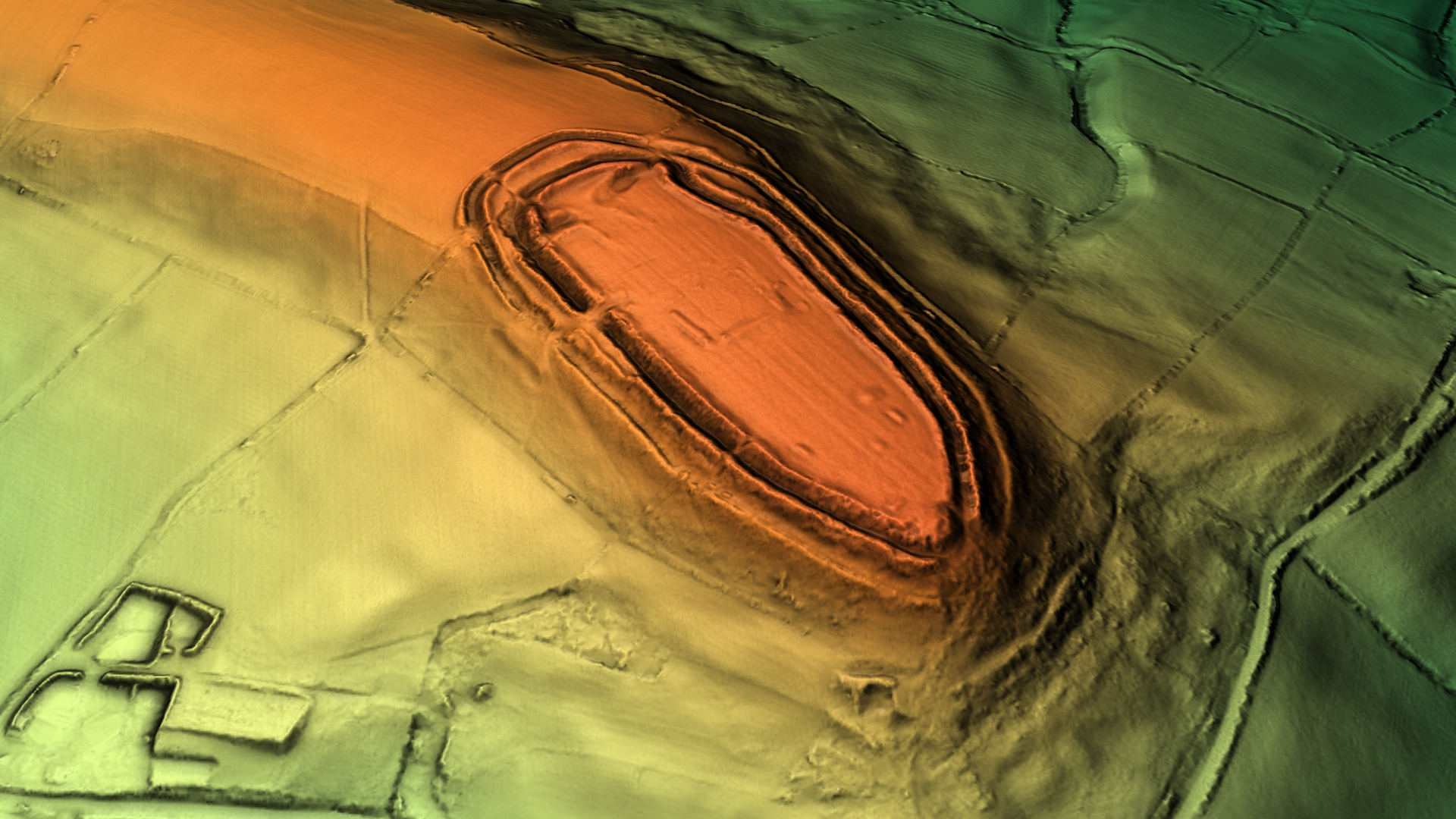
3D view of the digital terrain model

The rectilinear (square) structures in the centre of the fort are a medieval "pillow mounds" (man-made mounds for breeding rabbits), though Gelling hoped pre-excavation they might be Roman or Saxon. Very similar structures of similar medieval age were found by Cunliffe at Danebury Hill Fort. There is no clear evidence to distinguish the other mounds between pillow mounds and burial mounds, and the acid soil causes almost all bone and pottery to be in very poor condition. The National Trust in the 1982 excavations (which restored the mounds to their original profile prior to Gelling's excavation) confirmed them as medieval; Gelling had initially hoped they might be earlier, which was one of the reasons for the Pinney funded excavations. Additional rectilinear structures are noted in the 1999 National Trust Resistivity survey.. The 2016 survey shows over 60 roundhouses, some with overlapping locations, indicating a long period of occupation. It is probable the site was abandoned before the construction of nearby Waddon Hill Roman Fort in AD 50.

The hillfort and associated remains are a scheduled monument and it was on the Heritage at Risk Register but was removed in 2022 as a result of the Hillforts and Habitats Project.

== Landscape ==
Other notable high points in the vicinity are Lewesdon Hill (279 m), Dorset's highest point some 4 kilometres to the east, and Blackdown Hill (215 m), about 2 kilometres northwest. Though using the spelling Pillesdon, it was the central triangulation point for the area between 12 April and 1 June 1845 for the Principal Triangulation of Great Britain.

== Dorothy and William Wordsworth ==
In 1795–7 Dorothy and William Wordsworth lived at Racedown House—a property of the Pinney family—to the west of Pilsdon Pen. They walked in the area for about two hours every day, and the nearby hills—including Pilsdon Pen—consoled Dorothy as she pined for the fells of her native Lakeland. She wrote,

"We have hills which, seen from a distance almost take the character of mountains, some cultivated nearly to their summits, others in their wild state covered with furze and broom. These delight me the most as they remind me of our native wilds."

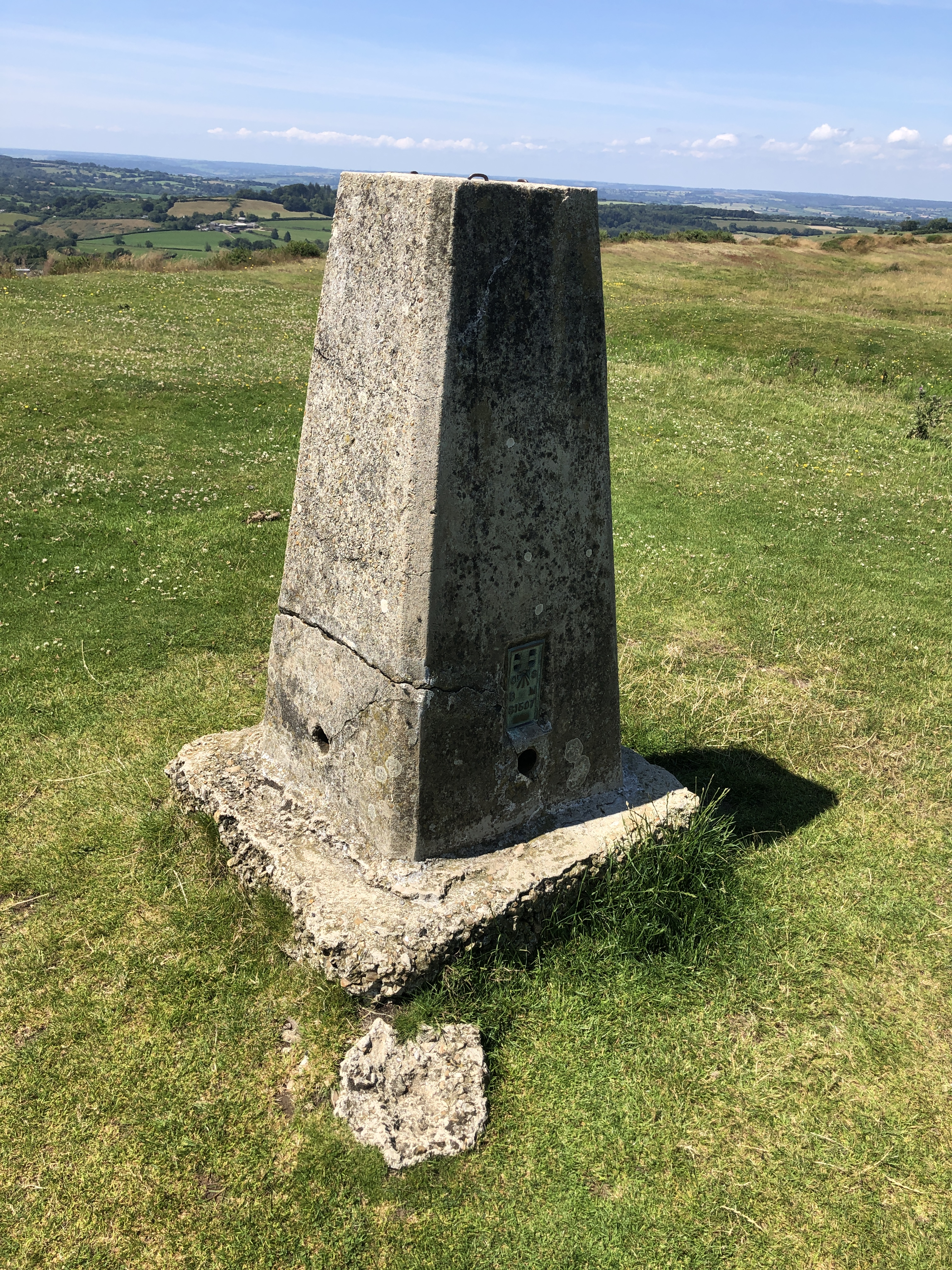
Triangulation stone at the summit of Pilsdon Pen

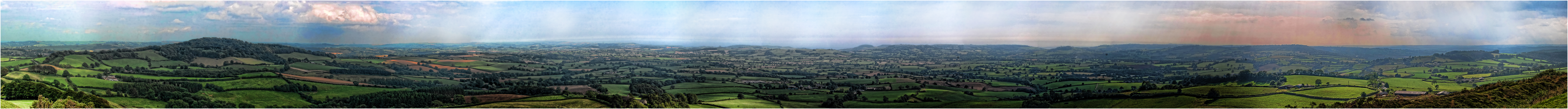

== See also ==
- Lewesdon Hill

== Bibliography ==
- Gelling, P. S. 1977: Excavations on Pilsdon Pen, Dorset, 1964-71. Proceedings of the Prehistoric Society 43, 263-286.
- Publications of the Dorset Natural History and Archaeological Society - Excavations at Pilsdon Pen, P.S.Gelling, 86 102; 87 90; 88 106-107; 89 123-125; 90 166-167; 91 177-178; 92 126-127; 93 133-134
- Publications of the Dorset Natural History and Archaeological Society - Excavations at Pilsdon Pen Hillfort, 1982, D.W.R.Thackray, 104 178-179
