= Lewesdon Hill =

Hill and hill fort in south west Dorset, England

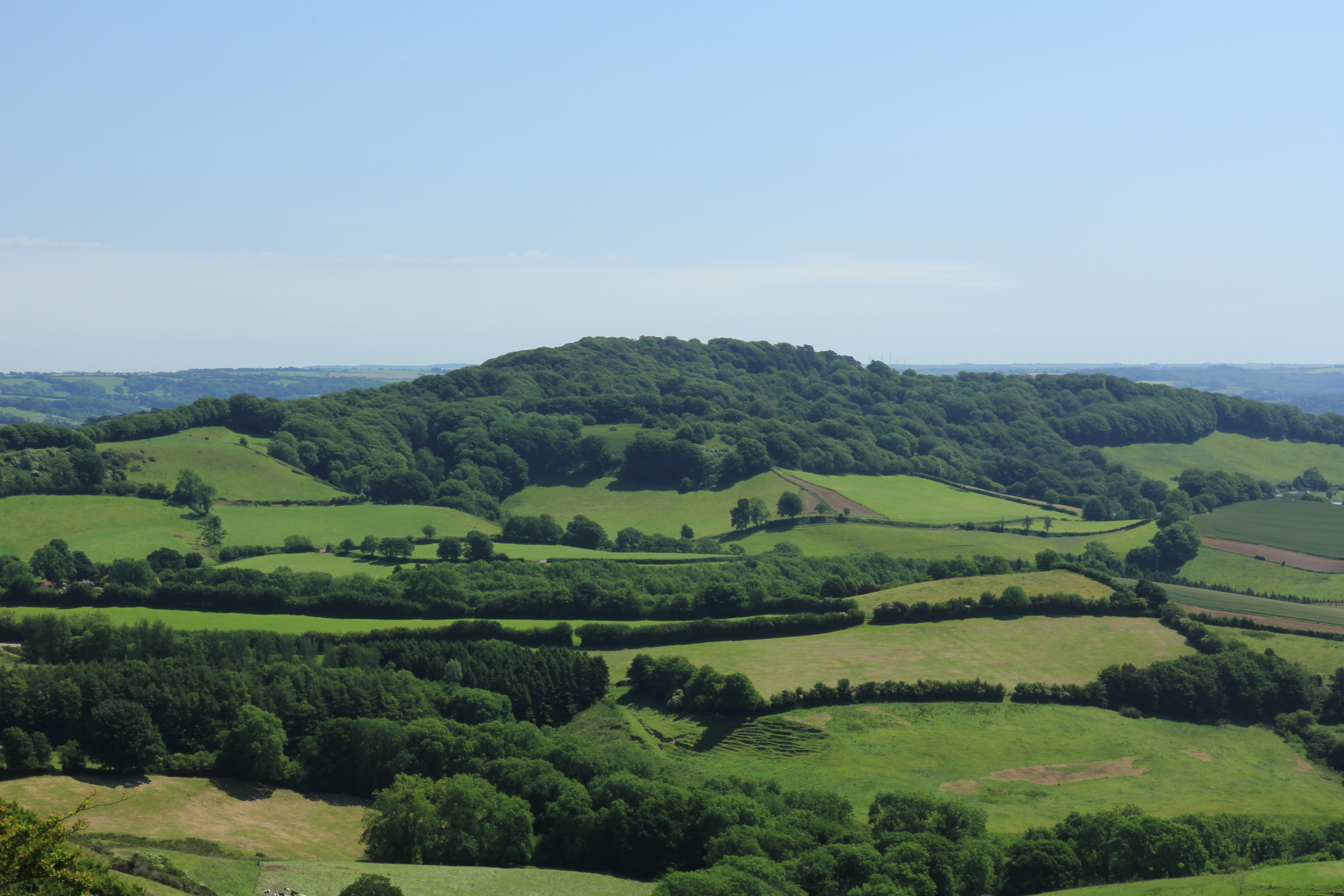
- Lewesdon Hill from the west

Highest point
- Elevation: 279 m (915 ft)
- Prominence: 185 m (607 ft)
- Parent peak: Staple Hill
- Listing: Marilyn, Hardy, County Top
- Coordinates: 50°48′28″N 2°47′59″W

Geography
- Location within Dorset
- Location: Dorset, England
- OS grid: ST437011
- Topo map(s): OS Landranger 193; Explorer 116

Climbing
- Easiest route: From Beaminster on the Wessex Ridgeway

Lewesdon Hill is a hill near Broadwindsor in west Dorset, England. With a maximum elevation of 279 m (915 ft), it is the highest point in Dorset. The hill is owned and managed by the National Trust and is part of the Dorset National Landscape.

== Geography ==
Lewesdon Hill stands about 2.5 miles (4.0 km) west of Beaminster, 1 mile (1.6 km) south of Broadwindsor, and 2 miles (3.2 km) east of another hillfort-topped eminence, Pilsdon Pen. To the south of the hill is the Marshwood Vale and to the north is the valley of the River Axe.

Lewesdon is the county top of Dorset. Its summit is an elongated ridge surrounded by beech woods. The actual summit is a low grassy mound at the east end of the ridge. For many years, nearby Pilsdon Pen (277 metres or 909 feet) was thought to be Dorset's highest hill, until modern survey revealed that Lewesdon Hill was 2 metres (6.6 ft) higher. Dorset's third highest point is Bulbarrow Hill (274 metres or 899 feet). Lewesdon's topographic prominence of 185 metres (607 ft) qualifies it as a Marilyn.

The hill is formed from Upper Greensand overlaying Gault Clay, the former being comparatively more resistant to erosion and therefore acting as a protective cap. Like its neighbouring hills, it is a surviving remnant of the greensand and gault layers which once would have overlaid the Lower Lias geology of the surrounding valleys. In this respect, it is an outlier of Devon's Blackdown Hills.

== Access ==
It is a National Trust property. There are two main footpaths leading up to the summit, one from the village of Broadwindsor, and one from Coombe Lane (off the B3162 between Broadwindsor and Bridport, just before the Four Ash crossroads). The Coombe Lane footpath leads to the hill via another, smaller hill, Crabb's Hill, which is privately owned. The east–west footpath is part of the Wessex Ridgeway.

== History ==
Many of the high hills in Dorset, including its neighbour Pilsdon Pen, are sites of an Iron Age hillfort. However Lewesdon's status as a hillfort is disputed, partly due to its small size and lack of any clear evidence. The recognition that the larger adjacent Waddon Hill was also an Iron Age enclosure reduces the likelihood of Lewesdon being a hill fort. Parts of a possible bank and ditch are still visible although they have been disturbed or created by gravel quarrying and timber removal. The remains of the hillfort are a scheduled monument.

Lewesdon was also the site of one of the Armada Beacons in 1588 used to warn of impending attack by Spain.

=== 1942 Spitfire Crash ===
Jean Verdon Marie Aime Decloedt was born in the St Giles district of London to parents working at the Belgian embassy, Prosper & Jeanne Decloedt. Jean was an engineer in the Belgian Air Component in 1940, which he left to join the Royal Air Force Reserves. He trained with the No.5 Flying School at MOD Sealand, and joined the 37 Maintenance Unit, Burtonwood at RAF High Ercall. Part of the deployment was to deliver Supermarine Spitfires around England as replacements.

On Sunday 15 March 1942 in the early afternoon, Jean entered his Spitifre Mk Vb BL463 (Berar 1), with the intention of delivering it to RAF Bolt Head. His path crossed over the hill and Broadwindsor, where, at 18:15, an aircraft's engine was heard spluttering. The impact into the north hillside killed Jean in an instant. The commonly accepted reason for the crash is the fog in the area, which had already downed 20 planes from the Polish 317 Squadron (the squadron he was delivering the Spitfire to).

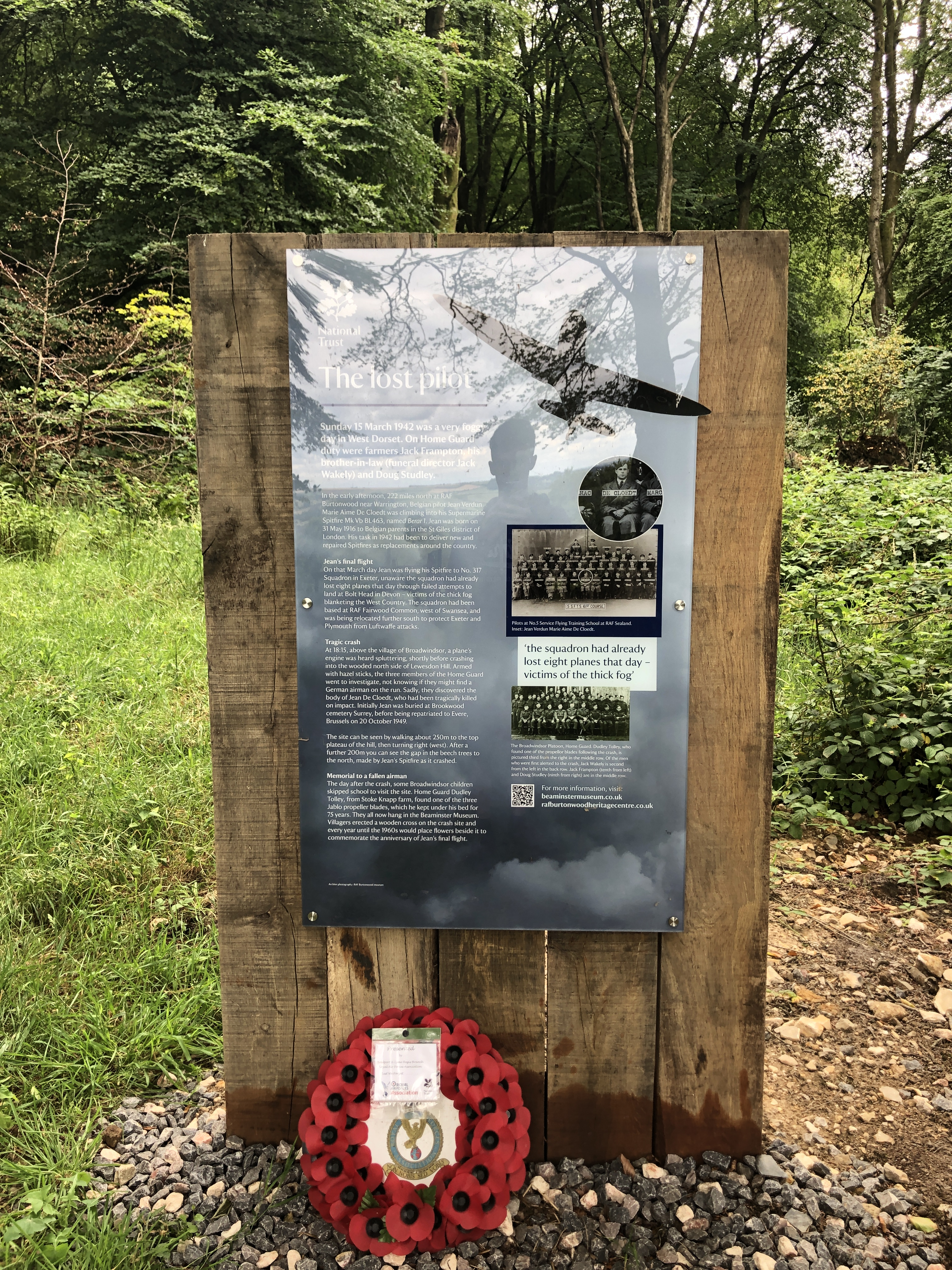
The "Forgotten Pilot" memorial

Three Home Guard members, Jack Frampton, Jack Wakely, and John Studley, were on guard that night, and climbed the hill to investigate. They found Jean's body, however the incident was kept secret by the MOD to not damage local morale. The body was taken to the Bridport Hospital Mortuary and buried at Brookwood Cemetery in Surrey, before being given to Brussels on Thursday October 20, 1949, 219 days after the crash. He received a headstone at Brussels Cemetery. One of the propellers was found by Dudley Tolley, a Home Guard and farmer in the area. He kept it under his bed for 75 years before donating it to the Beaminster Museum, where it now hangs.

Jean is known as "the forgotten pilot" in the area, as his legacy and the crash were forgotten after the 1960s after the initial memorial was overgrown. Andrew Frampton bought the name to public attention after a COVID infection forced him to stay home. He gathered funding and help from the National Trust and organised a memorial service on Tuesday, 15 March 2022, during which a new, permanent memorial was unveiled.

== Gallery ==
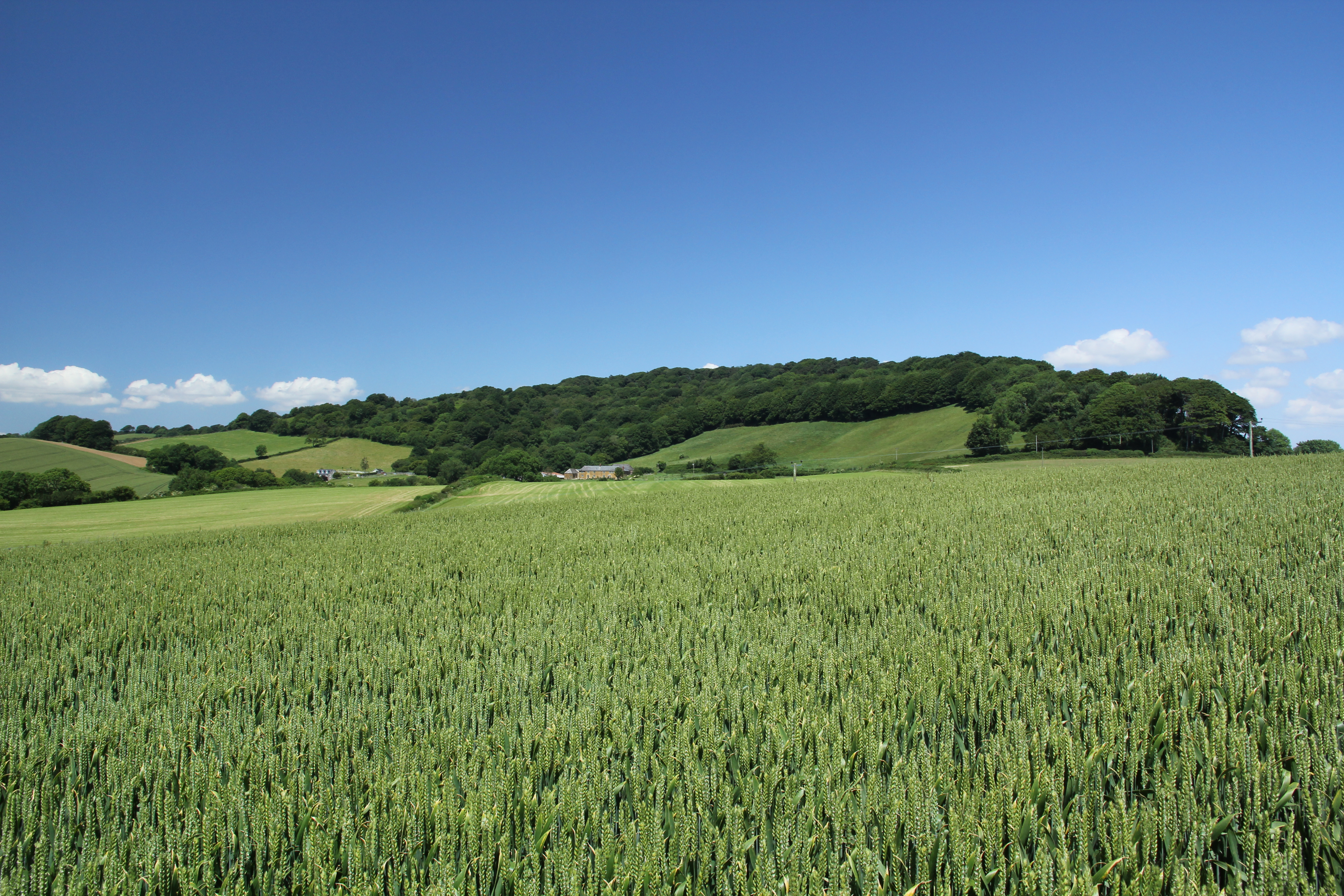
Lewesdon Hill from the south

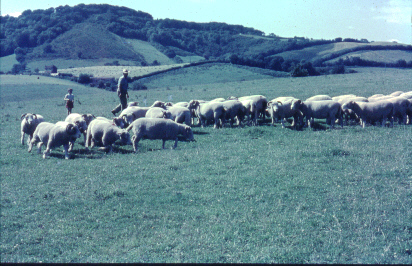
View of Lewesdon Hill from Leweston Farm in 1963

A view of the gate from the Broadwindsor path, with the Spitfire memorial in the bottom right

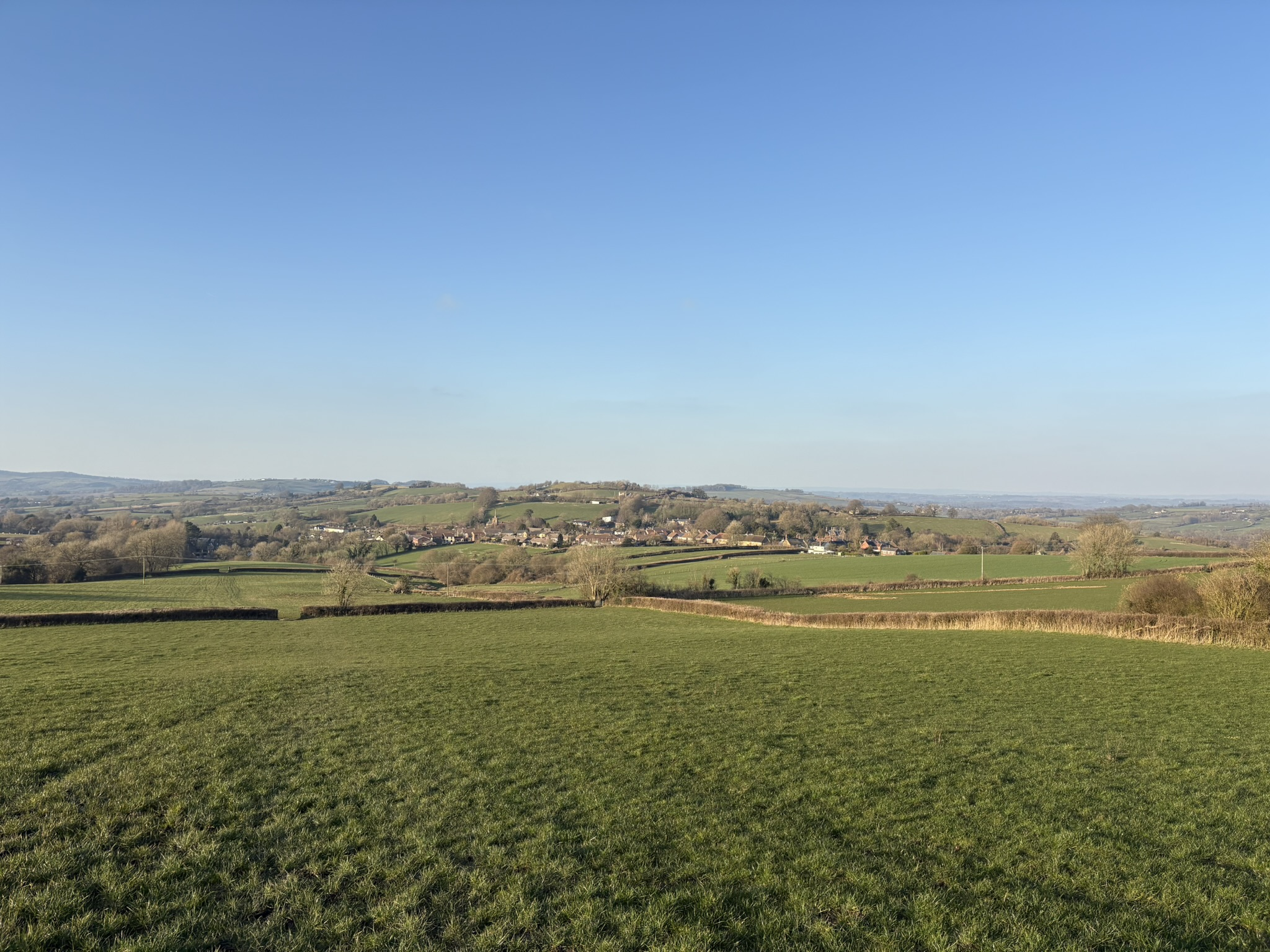
View of Broadwindsor from Lewesdon Hill
