= Bookham Knoll =

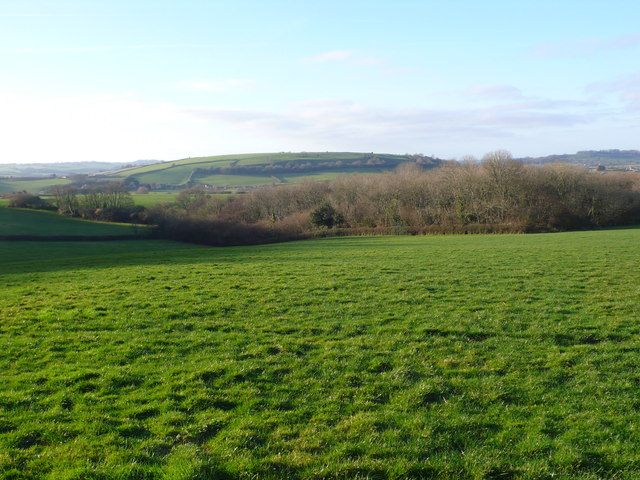
- Horse Close Wood on Alton Common with Bookham Knoll behind.

Highest point
- Elevation: 211 m (692 ft)
- Prominence: 43 m (141 ft)
- Parent peak: Lewesdon Hill
- Listing: Tump
- Coordinates: 50°50′25″N 2°25′28″W

Geography
- Location: Dorset, England
- Parent range: Dorset Downs
- OS grid: ST702046
- Topo map: OS Landranger 194

Bookham Knoll is a rounded hill, 211 metres (692 ft) high, about 1 kilometre southeast of the village of Buckland Newton in the county of Dorset in southern England. Its prominence of 43 metres (141 ft) qualifies it as one of the Tumps. It is located within the Dorset Downs.

The hill is largely treeless farmland. It is bounded to the west by B3143, and on the other three sides by a minor road passing through the hamlets of Rew, Sharnhill Green and Bookham, after which it is named. To the east, beyond the lane, a tributary of the River Lydden rises below the col separating the knoll from Church Hill, the western spur of Ball Hill. The Wessex Ridgeway runs from east to west along the ridge formed by Ball and Church Hills and about a kilometre south of Bookham Knoll.
