= Buckland Newton =

Village in Dorset, England

Coordinates: 50°50′47″N 2°26′24″W

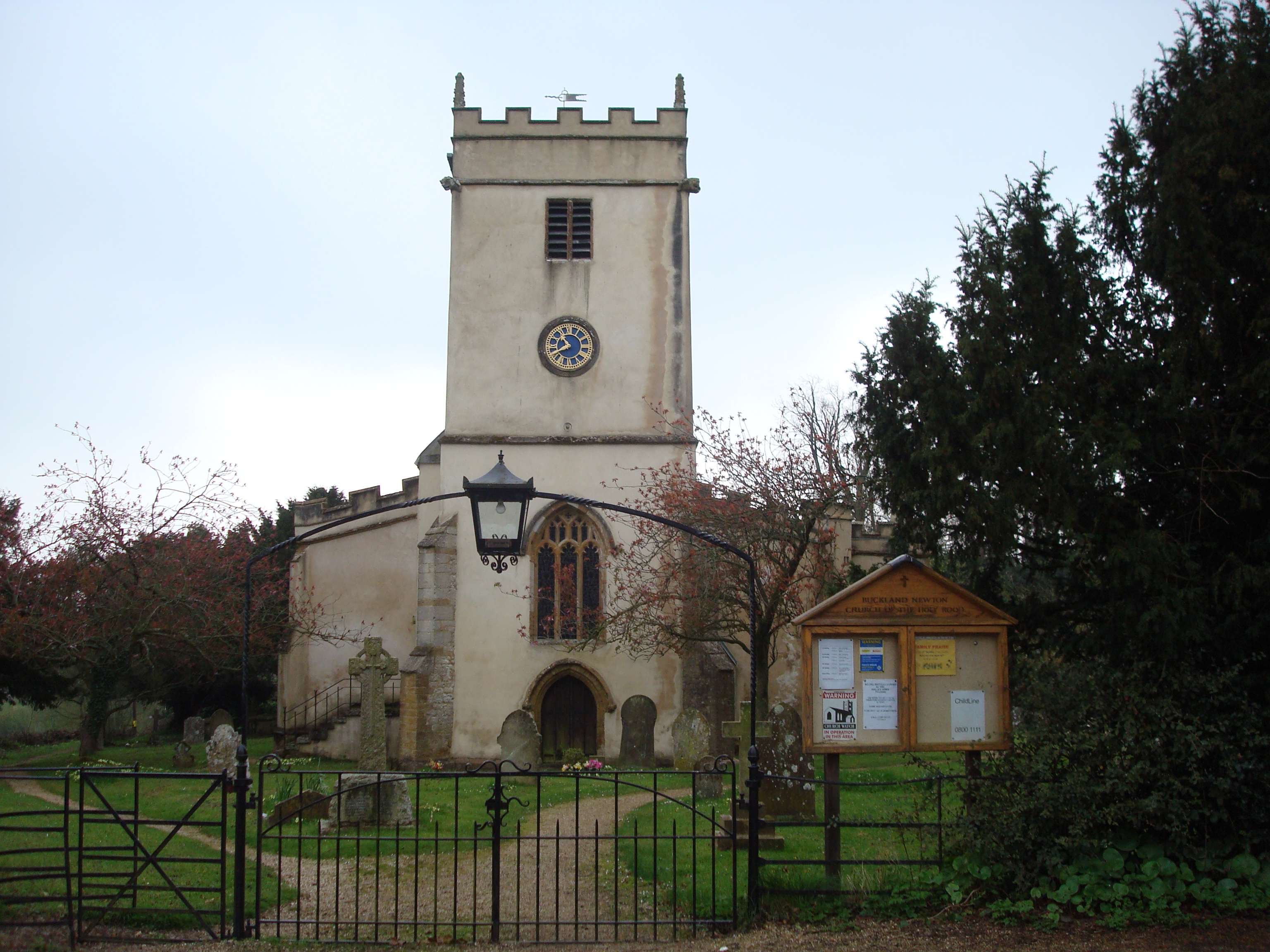
- The Church of the Holy Rood, Buckland Newton

- Location within Dorset
- Area: 6.6 sq mi (17 km^{2})
- Population: 671 (2021 census)
  - Density: 102/sq mi (39/km^{2})
- OS grid reference: ST692053
- Unitary authority: Dorset
- Ceremonial county: Dorset
- Region: South West
- Country: England
- Sovereign state: United Kingdom
- Post town: Dorchester
- Postcode district: DT2
- Dialling code: 01300
- Police: Dorset
- Fire: Dorset and Wiltshire
- Ambulance: South Western
- UK Parliament: West Dorset

Buckland Newton is a village and civil parish in Dorset, England. It is situated beneath the scarp slope of the Dorset Downs on the southern periphery of the Blackmore Vale, 7 1/2 miles (12.1 km) south of Sherborne. Approximately three quarters of the parish lies within the Dorset National Landscape area.

The parish covers an area of around 4,200 acres (17 km^{2}) and includes the hamlets of Bookham, Duntish, Henley and Sharnhill Green. In the 2021 census it had a population of 671 living in 289 households.

Amenities in the village include a pub (The Gaggle of Geese), shop, primary school and village hall.

== History ==
The name 'Buckland' derives from bōc-land, Old English for 'charter land' or land with special privileges created by royal diploma, while 'Newton' is a more recent addition taken from Sturminster Newton, a nearby town.

Evidence for prehistoric settlement comes from Bronze Age barrows at Gales Hill and the Iron Age hill fort of Dungeon Hill.

The historic parish was larger than the modern civil parish, at around 6,000 acres (24 km^{2}), and originally had five settlements, each with their own open field system: Buckland Newton, Brockhampton, Duntish, Henley (perhaps previously known as Knoll) and Minterne Parva, the last now part of Minterne Magna parish. Farms based on small mediaeval enclosures include Chaston Farm, Revels Farm, and possibly Bookham.

Although the parish church of the Holy Rood was restored in the 19th century, it has a 13th-century chancel and 15th-century nave, west tower and aisles, plus fragments of 12th-century sculpture which are evidence of an earlier structure. In 1980 the writer and literary director Roland Gant described Holy Rood as "a lovely church", but that the first impression it created was not favourable due to its exterior having been rendered in cement, "giving the Perpendicular square tower the look of a Foreign Legion fort". The church has six bells, the oldest having been cast around 1380.

Duntish Court, sited about 1/2 mile (0.80 km) north of the main village, was a compact, classical country house built in 1764 beside the main Weymouth to Bath turnpike road. Designed by William Chambers for Fitzwalter Foy, the court — originally named Castle Hill — had notable plasterwork, grounds of 1,300 acres (530 ha) and played a role in the arrest of agricultural labourers in Dorset's 'Captain Swing' riots of 1830. It was demolished in 1965.

== Geography ==
Prominent nearby hills at the top of the escarpment to the southeast include the 820 ft (250 m) Ball Hill and the 860 ft (260 m) Lyscombe Hill near the Dorsetshire Gap. The southern part of the parish is mainly chalk with an elevation ranging from 500–800 feet (150–240 m). The northern lies between 300–500 feet (90–150 m) above sea-level and is mainly clay with Gault and Corallian Limestone beds.

The River Lydden rises in the numerous springs round the village, principally Buckland Bottom and Bladeley Bottom

There are 11 locally recognised Sites of Nature Conservation Interest within or close to the parish, as well as areas of Ancient Woodland. The main habitat types for sites of wildlife interest are deciduous woodland and calcareous grassland (the latter is particularly significant for butterflies). There is also a small area of lowland meadows within Buckland Newton Itself.

== Governance ==
At the lower level of local government, as a civil parish Buckland Newton has a parish council of 9 members.

At the upper level, Buckland Newton is in Dorset unitary district. For elections to Dorset Council, it is part of Chalk Valleys electoral ward. Historically, the village was within the Buckland Newton Hundred. With the creation of rural districts in 1894, it became part of Cerne Rural District, before moving into Dorchester Rural District in 1933. From 1974 it was part of West Dorset district, until Dorset became a unitary district in 2019.

For elections to the Parliament of the United Kingdom, Buckland Newton is in West Dorset constituency.

== Demographics ==
Census population of Buckland Newton parish
Census	Population	Female	Male	Households	Source
1921	572				
1931	549				
1951	490				
1961	470				
1971	410				
1981	490				
1991	540				
2001	618	318	300	252	
2011	622	316	306	260	
2021	671	342	329	289	
