= Nether Cerne =

Hamlet in Dorset, England

Coordinates: 50.7829°N 2.4691°W

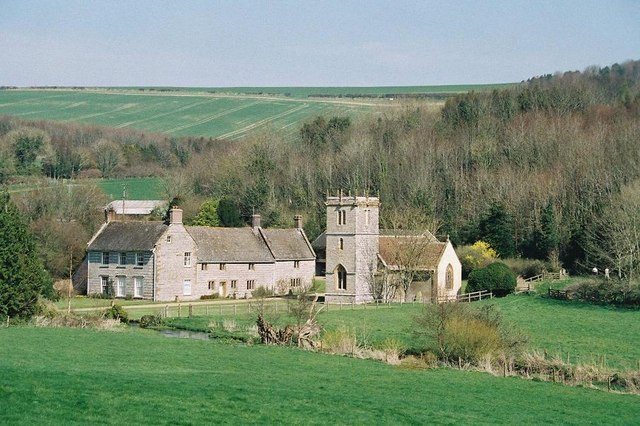
- Nether Cerne

- Location within Dorset
- Population: 20
- OS grid reference: SY670983
- Unitary authority: Dorset
- Ceremonial county: Dorset
- Region: South West
- Country: England
- Sovereign state: United Kingdom
- Post town: Dorchester
- Postcode district: DT2
- Police: Dorset
- Fire: Dorset and Wiltshire
- Ambulance: South Western
- UK Parliament: West Dorset

Nether Cerne is a hamlet and civil parish in the English county of Dorset. It lies within the Dorset unitary authority administrative area, about 5 miles (8.0 km) north of the county town Dorchester and 12 miles (19 km) south of Sherborne. The A352 road which connects those towns lies about 250 metres (270 yd) to the west. Dorset County Council's latest (2013) estimate of the parish population is 20.

== Etymology ==
For Cerne, see River Cerne: Etymology.

== Description ==
Nether Cerne is sited by the small River Cerne which rises near Minterne Magna 4 miles (6.4 km) to the north and runs in a narrow valley which is aligned roughly north-south. The Cerne Valley is one of several roughly parallel valleys which drain the dip slope of the Dorset Downs.

The settlement of Nether Cerne comprises a church and adjacent late 17th-century house, plus a few cottages. In 1906 Sir Frederick Treves described the house and church as "ancient old cronies, still hobnobbing together". All Saints Church was originally built from rubble and flint in the second half of the 13th century, though it was restored in 1876 and has a 15th-century tower. It is maintained by The Churches Conservation Trust (previously the Redundant Churches Fund).
