= River Cerne =

River in Dorset, England

Coordinates: 50.837501°N 2.48401°W

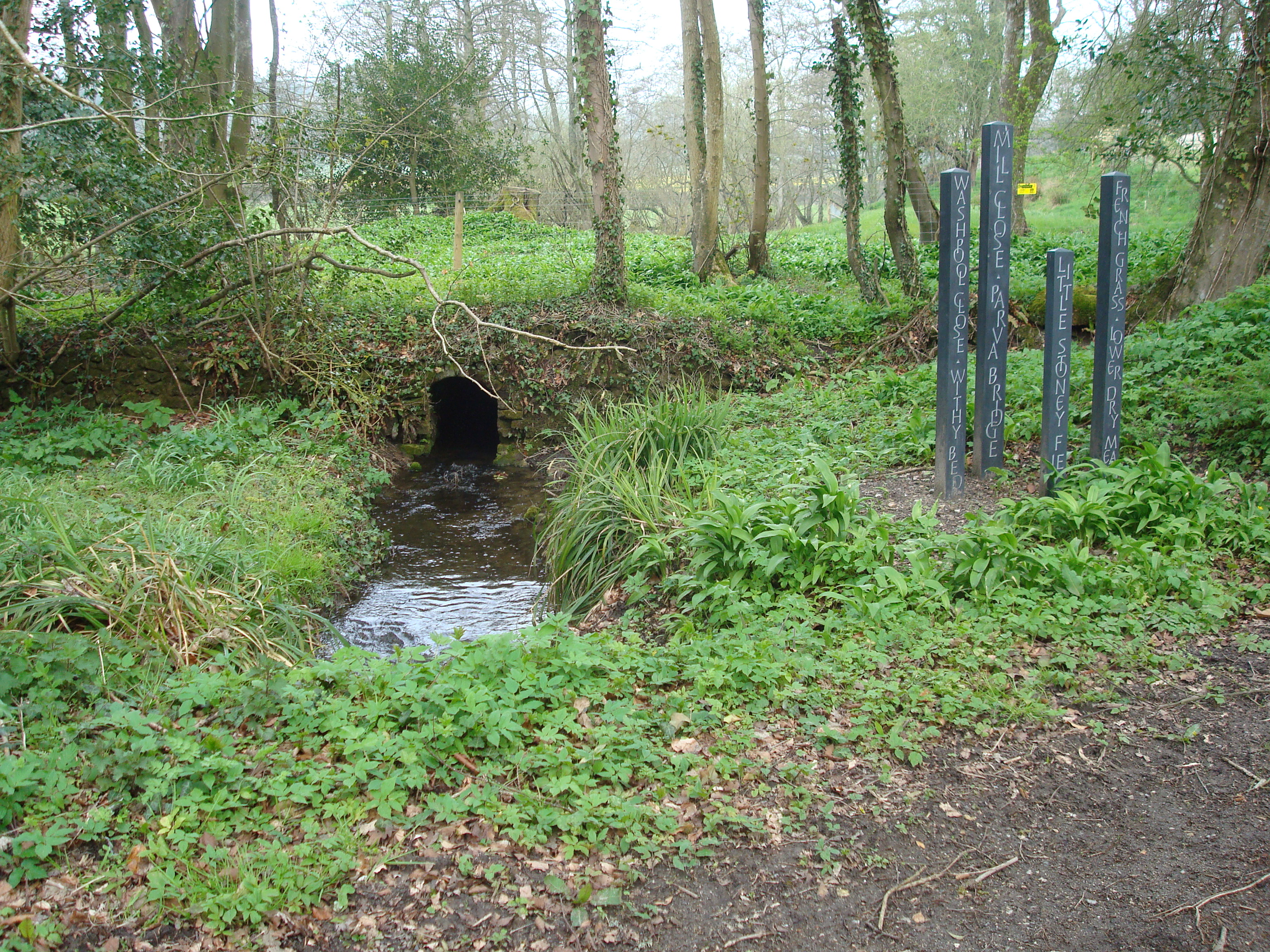
The River Cerne at its source in Minterne Magna

The River Cerne /ˈsɜːrn/ is a 10 mi (16 km) river in Dorset, England, and a chalk stream, which rises in the Chalk hills of the Dorset Downs at Minterne Magna, between High Stoy and Dogbury Hill, flows down a valley through Cerne Abbas and Charminster, and flows into the River Frome in Dorchester. The Cerne Valley lies in the Dorset National Landscape.

== Etymology ==
The name Cerne is derived from the Primitive Welsh *carn, "cairn, pile of stones," thus meaning "the stony stream." The pronunciation with soft 'c', instead of "chern" as would be expected (Old English *ċēarn), is suggested as being due to Anglo-Norman influence.

== Course ==
The Cerne has been described as "a friendly river, for none of its delightful villages shun the stream". Another wrote, "The change from the sheep-grazed open downland landscape of the river's source to the intimate enclosed beauty of Minterne Gardens is quite magical".

The river's valley is one of several roughly parallel valleys which drain the dip slope of the Dorset Downs. The Cerne Valley Way is a circular walk taking in the aforementioned hamlets and villages, as well as Nether Cerne, Godmanstone and Forston. This walk follows the course from near its source in the basin formed by the hill of High Stoy and Dogbury to its junction with the Frome in the water meadows at Charminster. Attractions along the route include Britain's largest hill figure, the Cerne Abbas Giant, Minterne House and Gardens and Hilfield Hill nature reserve.

== Geology, hydrology, fauna and flora ==
The Cerne is largely groundwater-fed with some upstream catchment, running primarily over chalk and upper greensand. The bed armour is mainly of flint overlain by seasonal sandy silt, with a healthy ecosystem of flora and fauna. A 2008 report by the Wild Trout Trust stated that a fishery owned by the Gallia family is located near to Nether Cerne which had been recognised by a trust conservation award. The report concluded that "the habitat of the River Cerne was excellent, providing good quality habitat for all life stages of brown trout".

In the past, the river has over spilled into Cerne Abbas, however no river-related flooding has occurred since a relief scheme, involving a system of gullies and culverts, and a reservoir capable of holding 44,000,000 litres of floodwater, was commissioned in 1986.
