= Turnworth =

Village and civil parish in Dorset, England

Coordinates: 50.867°N 2.2557°W

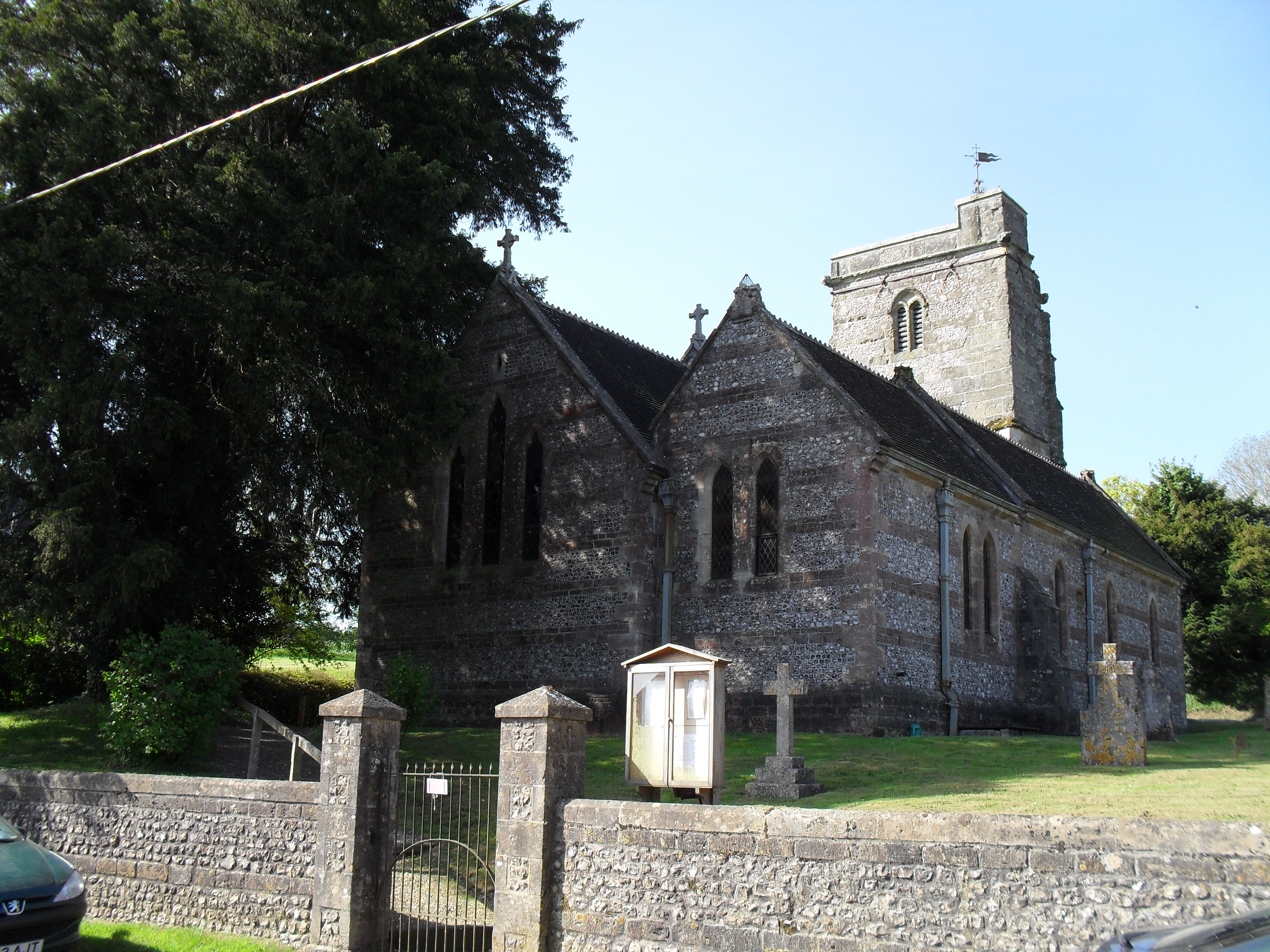
- St Mary's, Turnworth

- Location within Dorset
- Population: 30
- OS grid reference: ST 8210 0753
- Unitary authority: Dorset
- Ceremonial county: Dorset
- Region: South West
- Country: England
- Sovereign state: United Kingdom
- Post town: Blandford Forum
- Postcode district: DT11
- Police: Dorset
- Fire: Dorset and Wiltshire
- Ambulance: South Western
- UK Parliament: North Dorset

Turnworth is a small village and civil parish in north Dorset, England, situated on the Dorset Downs five miles (eight kilometres) west of Blandford Forum. It consists of a few cottages and farmhouses scattered around a church and manor house. In 2013 the civil parish had an estimated population of 30.

In 1086 in the Domesday Book Turnworth was recorded as Torneworde; it had 19 households, was in Pimperne Hundred and the lord and tenant-in-chief was Alfred of 'Spain'.

The church, with the exception of the tower, was rebuilt in the 19th century with assistance from Thomas Hardy, who designed the capitals and possibly also the corbels. Hardy described Turnworth's position as being "stood in a hole, but the hole is full of beauty", and he used Turnworth House as the inspiration for Hintock House in his novel The Woodlanders.

Nearby is Ringmoor, an ancient settlement on the top of the scarp face of the downs.

The manor house in the area is Turnworth House, which was demolished in 1947.

== Politics ==
For UK general elections, Turnworth is part of the North Dorset constituency.

Locally, Turnworth is part of the Stour and Allen Vale ward for elections to Dorset Council.
