= Watts Hill =

Hill in Dorset, England

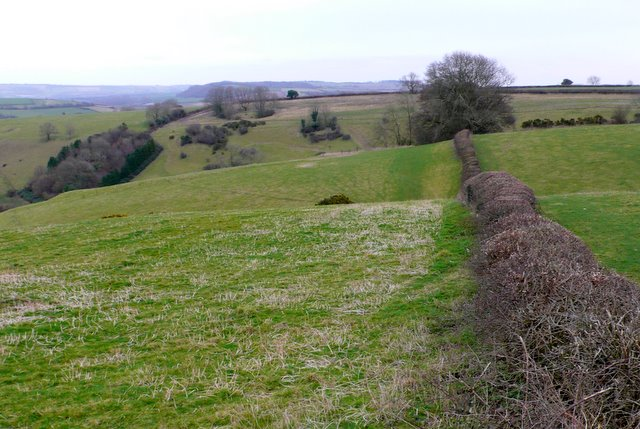
- View across Watts Hill, close to the C12, with Whitcombe Bottom just beyond.

Highest point
- Elevation: 262 m (860 ft)
- Prominence: 69 m (226 ft)
- Parent peak: Lewesdon Hill
- Coordinates: 50°49′54″N 2°27′53″W

Geography
- Location: Dorset, England
- Parent range: Dorset Downs
- OS grid: ST673036
- Topo map(s): OS Landranger 194; Explorer No. 117

Watts Hill is a hill in the Dorset Downs and one of the highest in the county of Dorset, England. The height of the summit is variously recorded as 261 metres or 262 metres.

== Location ==
Watts Hill lies about 1½ miles north of Cerne Abbas above the village of Minterne Parva, and about 12 kilometres north of Dorchester, the county town. It is the highest point on a north-south ridge, on the southern spur of which is the Cerne Abbas Giant, an old landmark whose origin is unclear. A mile to the northwest is Dogbury Hill and, on the far side of the A352 is Telegraph Hill and High Stoy, a popular filming location.

== History ==
There is much evidence of prehistoric settlement in the area. Near the Giant there are the remains of an ancient settlement, a tumulus and an earthwork on the southern spur near Cerne Abbas, and similar features further north near Dogbury.
