= Dungeon Hill =

Iron Age hillfort in Dorset, England

- Location within Dorset
- 50°51′55″N 2°26′30″W
- Type: Hillfort
- Periods: Iron Age; Roman
- Location: Near Buckland Newton, Dorset
- OS grid reference: ST 690 074

Site notes
- Area: 9 acres (3.6 ha)

Identifiers
- Atlas of Hillforts: 3591

Scheduled monument
- Designated: 26 October 1934
- Reference no.: 1016895

Dungeon Hill is an Iron Age hillfort, about 1 1/4 miles (2 kilometres) north of the village of Buckland Newton in Dorset, England. It is a scheduled monument.

== Description ==
The fort is on a low hill, height 600 feet (180 m); it has a single bank in a roughly oval shape, enclosing an area of about 9 acres (3.6 hectares). The rampart is 7 metres (23 feet) wide and about 1.5 m (4 ft 11 in) above the interior. It has an external ditch of width 13 m (43 ft) and depth 2 m (6 ft 7 in). The height of the rampart above the base of the ditch is up to 6 m (20 ft). There are traces af an outer bank on the east side.

There is an original causeway entrance of width about 3 m (10 ft) in the south; there are modern entrances in the north on both sides.

On the east facing slope of the hill there are four lynchets, suggesting cultivation in the medieval period.

== Remains found ==
In the late 18th century Fitzwalter Foy, resident of nearby Duntish Court, who was the owner of the fort, cleared the site of woodland, and he recovered human bones, sword blades, Roman coins and other finds. In 1881 there was some excavation of the site: Roman pottery, fragments of Roman querns and building stone were found; Roman tiles were found in the interior.

== See also ==
- Hillforts in Britain
