= Stock Gaylard House =

Historic site in Lydlinch, Dorset

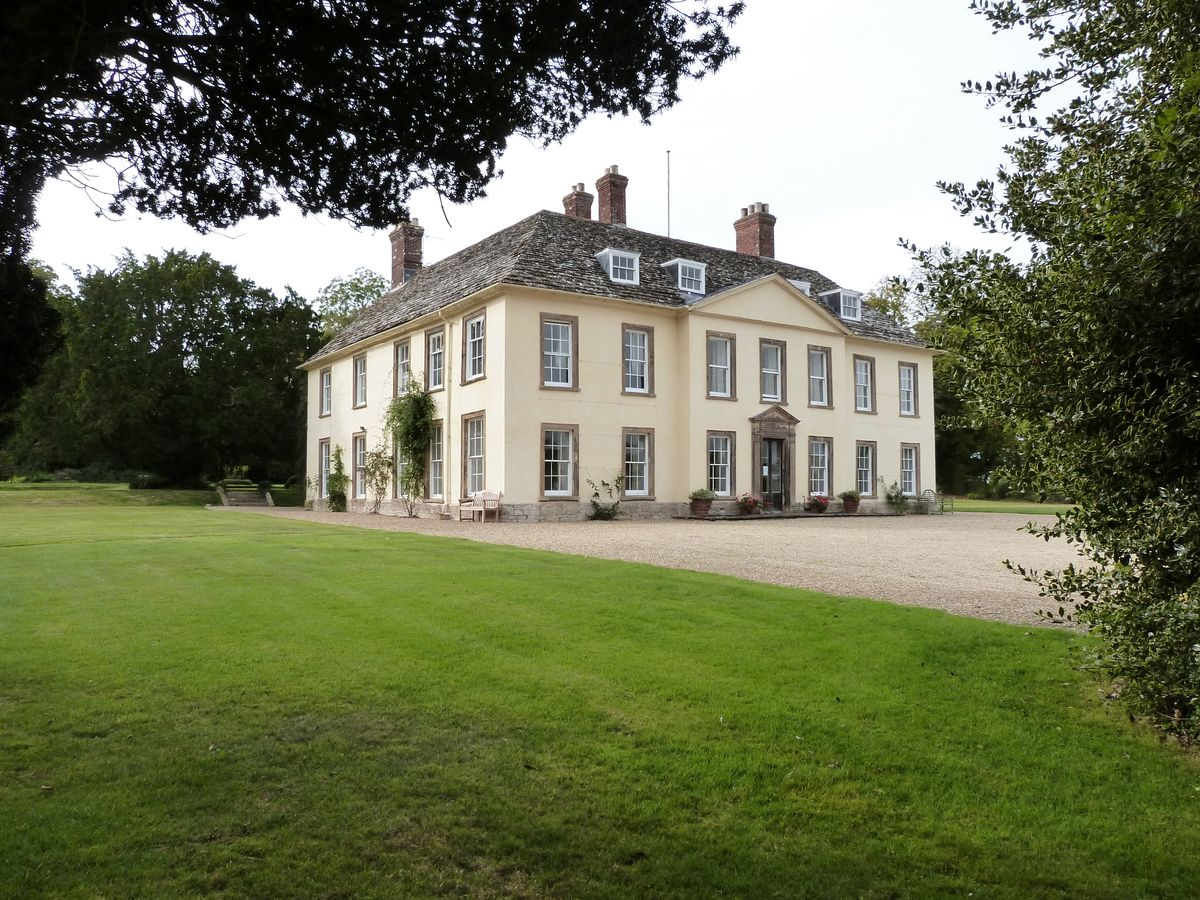
- Seen from the south-east

- Shown in Dorset
- 50°54′57.24″N 2°23′48.34″W
- Location: Near Lydlinch, Dorset
- OS grid reference: ST 72205 13007

Site notes
- Website: stockgaylard.com

Listed Building – Grade II*
- Designated: 4 October 1960
- Reference no.: 1324496

Stock Gaylard House is a country house near Lydlinch, and about 4 miles (6.4 km) west of Sturminster Newton, in Dorset, England. It is Grade II* listed. The house, dating from the early 18th century, is on an estate of about 1,800 acres (730 ha); this includes a deer park which is thought to have been created in the 13th century.

== History ==
The Domesday Book of 1086 recorded that the tenant-in-chief of Stock Gaylard was William of Eu, and that the lord of the manor was Hugh Maltravers. There were eleven households in the village. The 1332 subsidy roll recorded that there were five householders who were taxpayers.

From 1585 the property was owned by the Lewys family. The present house is thought to date from the early 18th century. In 1773, on the death of John Farr, brother-in-law of Charles Lewys, his daughter Theophila inherited the estate; in 1779 she married John Berkeley Burland (1754–1804), son of Sir John Burland. His family owned the manor of Steyning, and from 1802 he was MP for Totnes. He had the house remodelled and enlarged westwards.

Owners of the estate during the 19th century included Henry Farr Yeatman, who created a larger estate, and Huyshe Yeatman-Biggs, who became Bishop of Worcester in 1905. There were further additions to the house in the 1880s during his tenure.

== Description ==
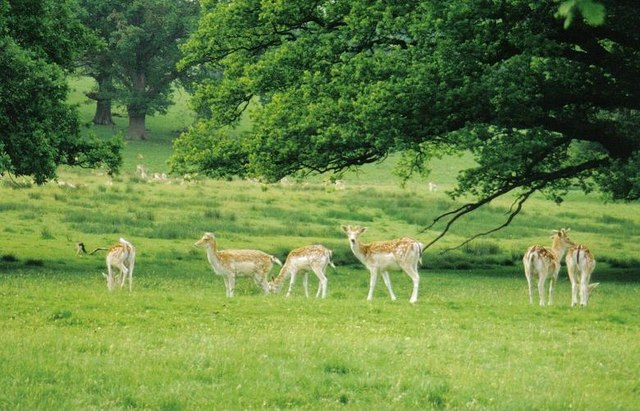
The deer park

The house has rubble walls, with external rendering. The east front is symmetrical, having a pedimented central pavilion of three bays, flanked on each side by two bays. The central door has stone pilasters supporting a dentilled pediment. There are two storeys, and an attic above.

The estate is about 1,800 acres (730 ha), of which about 300 acres (120 ha) is woodland. Glamping sites are available on the estate.

A license to empark deer was granted in 1268, and it is thought that a herd has been here since that time. The size of the deer park is about 80 acres (32 ha). There are about 120 adult deer, with about thirty fawns being born each year.
