= Andrew Rickman =

British entrepreneur

Andrew Rickman OBE is a British entrepreneur in the field of silicon photonics. He is the founder, and was executive chairman and CEO of Rockley Photonics, a technology firm based in the United Kingdom. He was Britain's first Internet billionaire. As CEO, he took Rockley Photonics public through a SPAC merger with a valuation of over US$ 1 billion in 2021 and the company went private again in 2023.

== Early life and education ==
Born circa 1960, his hometown was Bookham, Surrey. Rickman has a mechanical engineering degree from Imperial College, London; a PhD in silicon photonics from Surrey University (supervisor: Graham Reed) an MBA from Cranfield University and honorary doctorates from Surrey, Edinburgh Napier and Kingston Universities. He is a chartered engineer.

== Career and business ventures ==
=== Bookham Technology ===
Rickman was previously the CEO and Chairman of Bookham Technology, the first company to commercialise silicon photonics. He founded Bookham Technology in 1988. in the spare room in his family house in Wiltshire. Intel was an early investor in Bookham and Gordon Moore was involved.

Bookham grew rapidly from a start-up to a FTSE100 company, making Rickman the first technology billionaire in the UK, with a personal wealth of over £1.5 billion in the summer of 2000. Its valuation crashed as the dotcom bubble burst in 2000. Bookham Technology had an IPO in 2000, and later in 2009, became Oclaro. After moving the company to Silicon Valley, he left the company in 2004 to focus on being a technology investor.

=== Rockley Ventures ===
He invested $10 million Kotura in 2008, becoming chairman and joining the board of directors.

By 2009, he had created the investment company Rockley Ventures with his brother Robert. The company had invested in Blue Whale Mail, and Spikes Cavell. Other recent stakes included Firecomms. In 2009, he and his brother launched a new $100 million technology fund in China, in partner with the Shandong Academy of Sciences and Shandong High-Tech Investment Corporation. In 2010, it was reported that Rickman and his brother had raised $200 million from the Shandong and Shanxi governments to invest in technology firms in various Chinese provinces, such as Shandong Micro-Sensor Photonics. His Rockley China Fund was mostly backed by Hong Kong-based investors.

=== Rockley Photonics ===
He started a new business, Rockley Photonics, in 2013, as CEO. The company, which designs silicon photonic chips, was based in Oxford and California. In 2014, he was chairman and CEO of Rockey Photonics, and he had recently been Kotura chairman, a silicon photonics company which is now part of Nvidia. As CEO, he took Rockley Photonics public through a SPAC merger with a valuation of over one billion dollars in 2021.

He resigned as CEO of Rockley Photonics Holdings Limited in December 2022, instead becoming executive chairman of Rockley. In early 2023, the company filed for bankruptcy protection and underwent a restructuring. In June 2023, he remained CEO of Rockley Photonics. The company went private again in 2023.

== Honours and awards ==
Rickman was awarded an OBE for services to the telecommunications industry, and is a winner of the Royal Academy of Engineering Silver Medal for his outstanding contribution to British Engineering in 2002. In 2000, Rickman was named UK Technology and Communications Entrepreneur of the Year by Ernst and Young.

== Other achievements ==
In 2011, Rickman was awarded an Honorary Professorship at SIMIT, Chinese Academy of Sciences. Rickman has held advisory board positions with the East Asia Institute of the University of Cambridge and Applied Science and Technology Research Institute of Hong Kong.
