= Caundle Brook =

River in Dorset, England

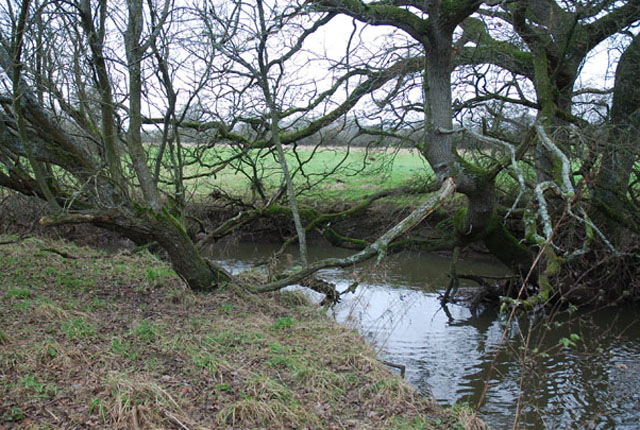
- Caundle Brook near Lydlinch

- Location within Dorset

Location
- Country: United Kingdom
- County: Dorset

Physical characteristics
- Source
  - location: Cosmore
- Mouth
  - location: Lydlinch
  - coordinates: 50.9281°N 2.3603°W

Caundle Brook is a 13.4 miles (21.6 km) tributary of the River Lydden that flows through Blackmore Vale in Dorset, England.

Its headwaters rise at the foot of Dogbury Hill near Cosmore. The brook then flows in a northerly direction past the villages of Middlemarsh and Tiley until it collects The Cam and a second tributary that drains Caundle Marsh. Here it turns east, and is then crossed by Cornford Bridge and then the A3030 near Bishop's Caundle. It continues past Rowden Mill south of Stourton Caundle before being crossed by the A357 at Warr Bridge, beyond which it joins the Lydden near Lydlinch.

== See also ==
- List of rivers of England
