= Ringmoor =

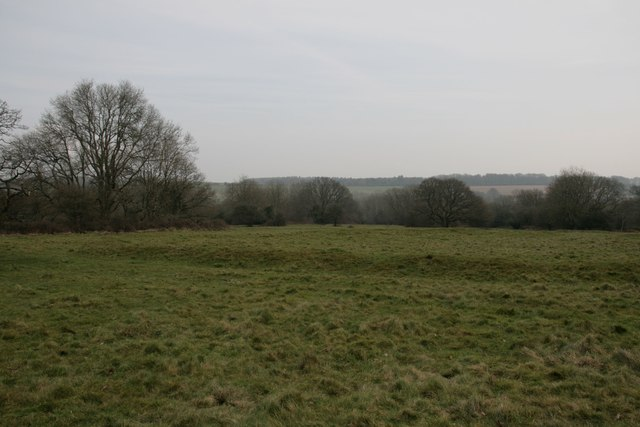
- Looking east across the site

- Location within Dorset
- 50°52′35″N 2°16′25″W
- Periods: Iron Age
- Location: Near Turnworth, Dorset
- OS grid reference: ST 808 086

The Ringmoor settlement is an Iron Age/Romano-British farming settlement in Dorset, England. It is between the villages of Okeford Fitzpaine and Turnworth, and lies on east-facing slopes of Bell Hill, on the Dorset Downs.

The site is owned by the National Trust, and is a Scheduled Ancient Monument.

== Earthworks ==
The site is well preserved in unploughed downland. There is a farmstead, an oval enclosure about 45 metres (148 ft) by 33 metres (108 ft), with an entrance on the east; inside are levelled areas, thought to be the sites of buildings. Outside the enclosure, trackways and field systems are still clearly visible as banks in the grassland.

== More recent occupation ==
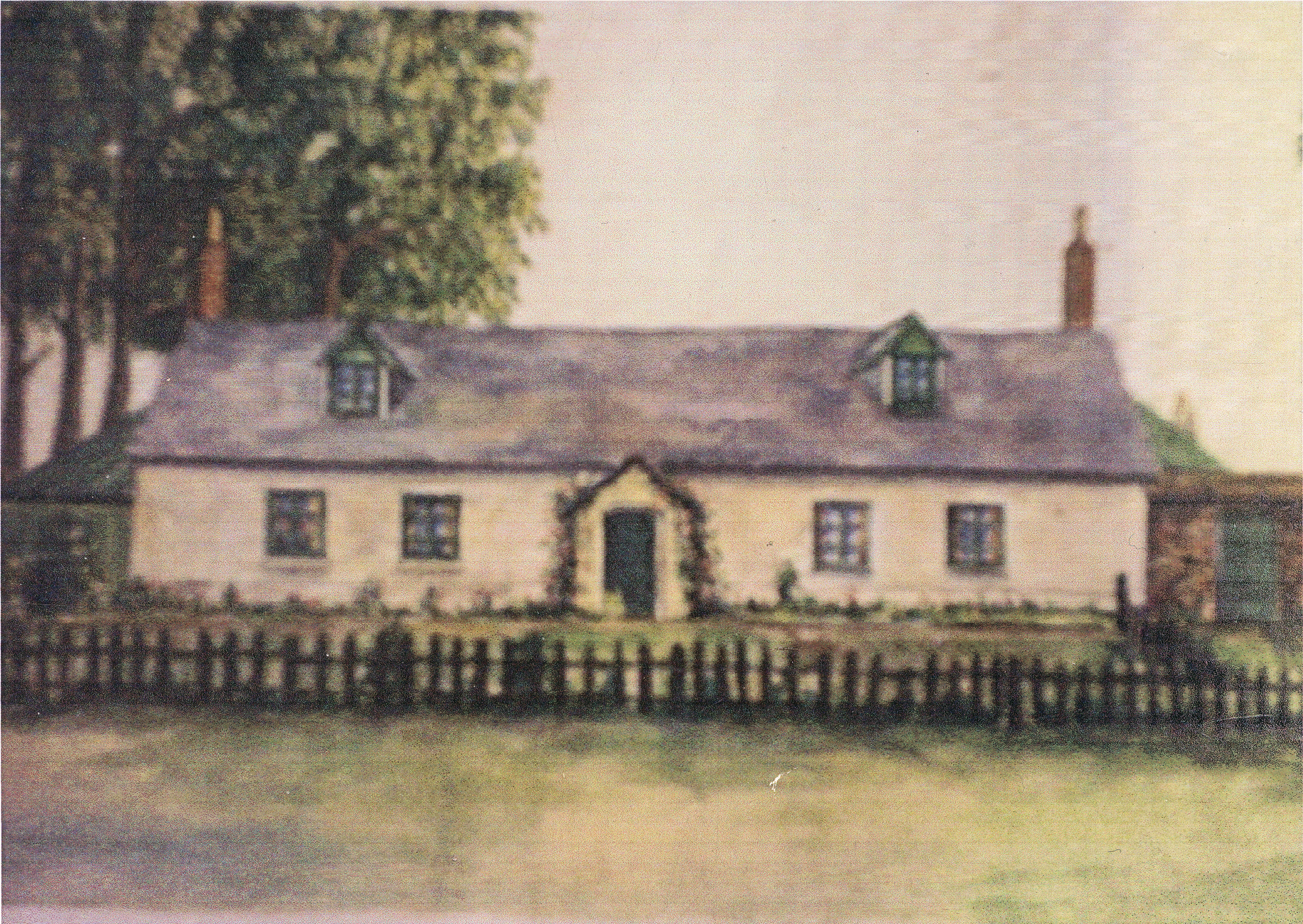
Painting of Ringmoor Cottages

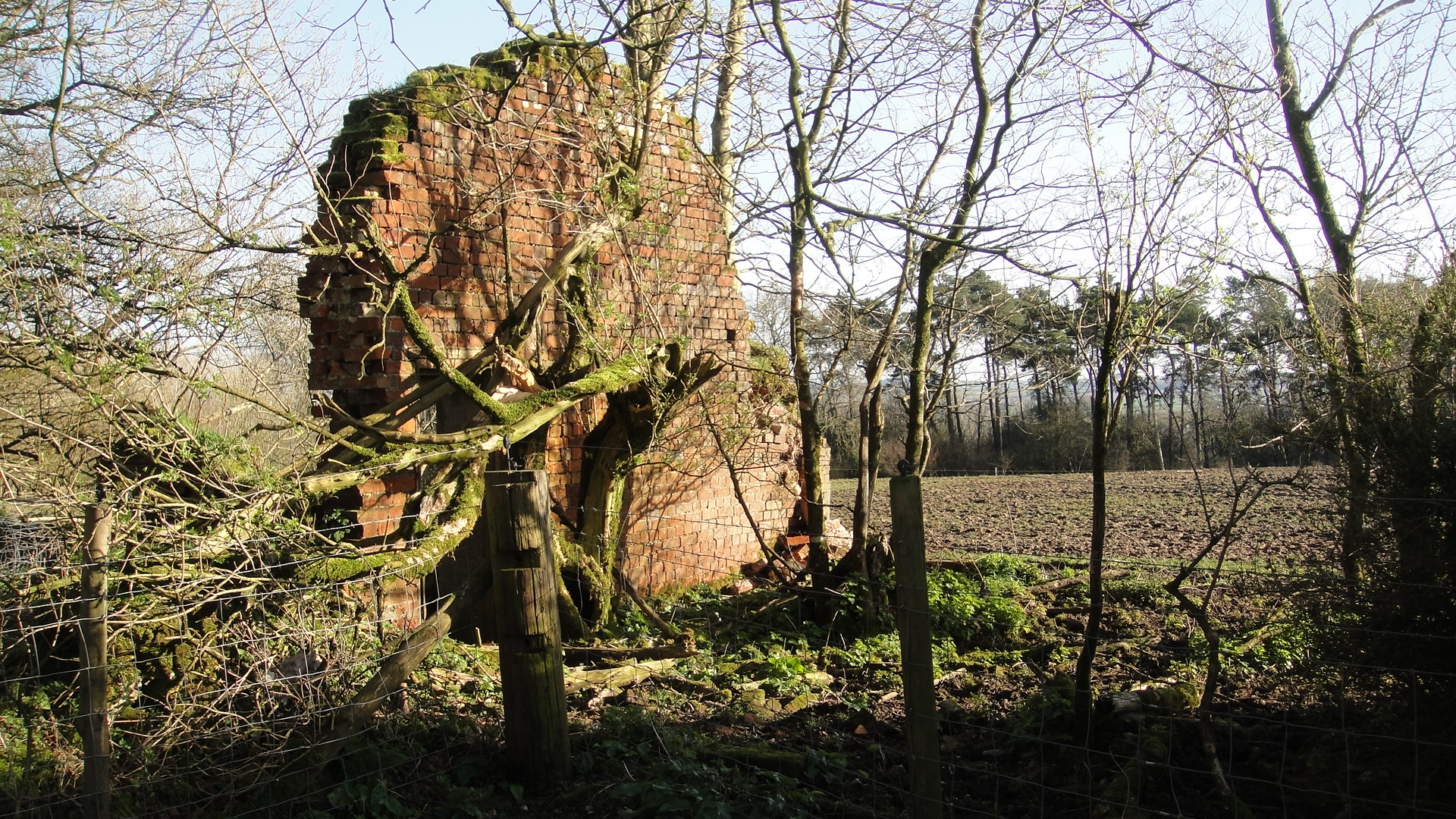
Ruins of Ringmoor Cottages – gable wall in 2020

Ringmoor Cottages, built in the mid 19th century, once stood on the site, but they were vacated and demolished in the early 1950s.
