= Mounteer =

English surname

- Pronunciation: Mounteer

Origin
- Origin: Anglo-Saxon
- Meaning: possibly a topographical name for a dweller by a mineral pool or, alternatively, the mount, hill, from the Old English element "munt", a mount, hill. However, the famous Historian A.L.Rowse, in his history of the Cornish in America, says the name Mounter comes from Polmounter and Pellymounter. The Pol and Pelly were dropped over the centuries. In G Pawley White's book 'Cornish Names' it is said the name comes from the words 'pol-mun-tyr' meaning 'pool by the mineral land' in the ancient Cornish ( Celtic ) language. This suggests that Mounteer may not be related to the name Mounter unless it also comes down from a Celtic name.
- Region of origin: England

Other names
- Variant forms: Mounter ( Cornwall, Celtic), Monteer, Mounteere, Mountar, Mountere, Monter, Menteer, Mountier, Montare, Manter, Montier, Monteir

Mounteer is a surname that probably originated in Cornwall, England.

== Early Mounteers ==
The origins of the name can be traced back to:

England

=== Surrey ===
The earliest documented Mounteer family in England is found in Surrey, where the surname appears continuously from the late 15th century through the late 17th century, migrating gradually from the North Downs toward London/Southwark.

1. Richard Mounteer (or Monter) died in Leatherhead, Surrey, England, in September 1488. He was married to Joan (died 1489). His son John Mounteer died March 3, 1569, in Merstham, Surrey, and daughter Frances died February 24, 1563, in Merstham, Surrey. Leatherhead and Merstham are approximately eight miles apart in the North Downs belt of Surrey.
2. Edmond Mounter (died December 1606) of Bookham, in the County of Surrey, yeoman. His will, dated 15 January 1606 and proved 2 January 1607, identifies his wife Thomasine (Tomasie), whom he appointed sole executrix; his son Edny Mounter; his daughters Mary Mounter (unmarried) and Elizabeth, wife of Gilet (Giles) Hitchbye; and his granddaughter Katerine Mounter, daughter of Edny. Among other bequests, Edmond left Mary household goods including pewter and bedding, Elizabeth a coffer, Katerine ten shillings, and his servant Agnes Meades a bullock. He directed that he be buried in the church or churchyard of Fetcham (or Effingham). Bookham is approximately five miles from Leatherhead, where Richard Mounteer had died over a century earlier, indicating continued family presence in the same area of Surrey.
3. By the 1640s, a Mounteer family was established in the Bermondsey/Southwark area, approximately 15 miles north of the North Downs parishes. Ann Mounterewe (also indexed as Mounterone) married George Belford (or Bedford) on 30 March 1646 at St Olave's, Bermondsey, Tooley Street, Southwark.
4. John Mountarne of St Mary Magdalene, Bermondsey, was living in the parish by the early 1650s. His infant or child son, also named John Mountarne, was buried at St Mary Magdalene, Bermondsey, on 28 February 1653. St Olave's and St Mary Magdalene were adjacent parishes in Bermondsey, and Ann Mounterewe and John Mountarne were likely members of the same family.
5. James Mounteer (recorded as "Thomas" in The National Archives catalogue), a mariner of St. Mary Magdalen, Bermondsey, Surrey, who died beyond the seas aboard the ship [?John and Mary]. His inventory, recording a single asset of £7 in unpaid wages from the ship, was exhibited at London on March 11, 1684/5, by his mother Mariam Mounteer. The November 11, 1681, date in the catalogue likely refers to his death. The catalogue (PROB 4/16849) records the first name as "Thomas," but the document itself is signed "James" by mark — the discrepancy is likely a clerical or indexing error in the PROB 6 act book from which the catalogue description derives. James was from the same Bermondsey parish as John Mountarne (no. 4 above); Mariam was likely John's wife or widow, making James a son or younger son of John Mountarne.

=== Dorset ===
The parish of Gillingham in north Dorset contains the earliest documented concentration of the Mountier surname, with records spanning at least four generations from the 1570s to the 1650s. A separate branch was established in Wool in south Dorset by the 1640s.

6. William Mountier (born c. 1540, Dorset, England) is the earliest known ancestor of the Dorset Mountier family. His origins and parentage are unknown. Five of his children were baptised at Gillingham, Dorset, between 1571 and 1580: Henry (baptised 22 April 1571), John (baptised 8 May 1574), Thomas (baptised 7 April 1576), Francis (baptised 26 March 1578), and Edith (baptised 10 February 1580). William Mountier of Gillingham and Edmond Mounter of Bookham, Surrey (no. 2 above) were exact contemporaries; whether they were related has not been established.

His son Thomas Mountier (baptised 7 April 1576, Gillingham) had at least seven children recorded in the Gillingham registers, including Alice (born c. 1589), who married Robert Smart of Dorset; John; Eleanor; Agnes; Francis; William; and Susanna.
By the 1640s, the next generation — Henry Mountier and Thomas Mountier, both described as "de Langham" (a hamlet within the parish of Gillingham) — were established in the area. All three Mountier men in the parish — Henry, Thomas, and a second Thomas (likely father and son) — appear on the Protestation Return for the Liberty of Gillingham in 1642. The Gillingham burial register, written in Latin, records two associated burials: "Aynetha Mountier filia Thome Mountier de Langham" (Aynetha Mountier, daughter of Thomas Mountier of Langham), buried 22 May 1642; and "Aynetha Mountier uxor Henrici Mountier de Langha" (Aynetha Mountier, wife of Henry Mountier of Langham), buried 6 January 1645. The child was likely named after her aunt by marriage, suggesting that Thomas and Henry were brothers.

7. A separate but almost certainly related Mountier family (spelled Mounteour, Mounteer, or Mountyer in different documents) was established approximately 45 miles to the south in the parish of Wool, in the Liberty of Bindon, by the early 1640s. The 1641–42 Protestation Return for Wool, administered by the Rev. John Galton, Vicar of Coombe Keynes and Wool, lists three Mounteer men: John Mounteer, who served as ouseers for ye poore (Overseer of the Poor); and Thomas Mountyer, listed twice consecutively, indicating a senior and junior of the same name.

Thomas Mounteour senior married Agnes (née unknown). Agnes was buried at Wool on 11 November 1648. No baptism, marriage, or burial record for Thomas senior himself has been identified in publicly accessible indexes.
Thomas Mounteour junior (identified in the registers as "Thomas Mounteour" and, on at least one occasion, as "the younger") married Joane (Joan). Their children baptised at Wool include: Thomas (baptised 14 October 1640); Joan (baptised 13 January 1641); John (baptised 23 January 1641, likely a twin with Joan given the ten-day interval); William (baptised 15 September 1645); and Edward (baptised 1 May 1648, born at "Wooll bridge," near the site of Woolbridge Manor). The burial register records: "Joane Mounteer daughter of Thomas Mounteer ye young[er] & Joane his wife was buryed at Wooll Novemb: 5" in 1652.
John Mounteour (the Overseer of the Poor) married Elianor (Eleanor). Their known children include Elizabeth (baptised 19 November 1643).
The precise relationship between the Wool and Gillingham branches has not been established from surviving records. The Wool parish registers begin in 1583 (marriages) and 1585 (christenings), so records documenting the arrival of the Mounteer family in Wool may survive in the original registers held at the Dorset History Centre in Dorchester.
The Wool Mounteers lived through the English Civil War in an area of active conflict. Wool was situated between the contested towns of Wareham and Corfe Castle. The nearby ruins of Bindon Abbey were reportedly burned during the war. The Battle of Holmebridge (27 February 1644), fought between Royalist and Parliamentary forces approximately two miles west of Wareham, took place within a few miles of Wool. Agnes Mounteour's burial in November 1648 coincided with the final collapse of Royalist resistance and the onset of the Commonwealth.

=== Kent ===
8. Richard Mounteer (otherwise Mounte, Mounteere, Mountier, Mounter, Munter or Monnter), a cornett player at Canterbury Cathedral, living in Canterbury, England between 1633 and c. 1660. He first married Mildred Hartt on August 5, 1633, at St Margaret's, Canterbury. Mildred presumably died before February 1636, as Richard's subsequent children were all born to his second wife, Katharine (buried March 11, 1680, at St Peter's, Canterbury). By Katharine he had daughters Elizabeth (baptised February 15, 1636, at St Margaret's), Sara (baptised August 12, 1641, at St Peter's, died August 13, 1641), Ellyn (baptised September 25, 1642), Tamosin (baptised January 28, 1644, died September 11, 1645), and Anne (baptised September 12, 1646); and sons William (baptised May 17, 1639, at St Margaret's) and Richard (baptised January 26, 1648, died March 17, 1650). He was part of the cathedral's cornett and sackbut consort alongside cornett player John Foade and sackbut players Francis Lineall and Francis Onslowe. When the cathedral's musical establishment was suppressed during the English Civil War, Richard remained in Canterbury and petitioned the Burghmote for the freedom of the city on December 18, 1655. Upon the Restoration (c. 1660), he and his fellow instrumentalists petitioned to be reinstated to their cathedral positions. Katharine, presumably widowed, later petitioned the Burghmote to be relieved of paying the poor rate.

=== Other English references ===
9. Alis Mounteer (Mounteere) married Henry Bernard on February 12, 1684, in Wiltshire, England.
10. Anthony Mounteer, a mariner living in Liverpool, Lancashire, England, in 1749. He married Margaret on January 22, 1746, at St. Peter's Church, formerly located on Church Street, Liverpool.

US

1. Henry Mounteer (or Mounteere), a tanner, living in Northampton County, Virginia, United States on October 28, 1679. He was an indentured servant of John Stinger.

2. James Mounteer (or Mounteere, Montare, Montier, or Mountier), an innkeeper, owned five acres of land in Boston, Massachusetts Bay Colony, between 1687 and 1695. He was apparently from France, coming to Boston with his wife and an English maid. He acted as security for Daniell Bernardo on October 31, 1701, in Boston. In 1707 and 1709, he applied to sell liquor as a retailer. He was probably an innkeeper between 1712 and 1717, as records show that he petitioned for a licence to sell liquor at an inn. In 1719 he was granted permission to sell liquor from his house on King Street, Boston.

3. William Mounteer (Mountere or Mountier), a tavern keeper, living in Middlesex County, New Jersey, in the Thirteen Colonies, between 1748 and 1767. William Mountere or Mountier was living in Princeton, New Jersey, in the summer of 1748, in a house which he rented from Judge Thomas Leonard, at £20 per annum, and was building a house in Middlesex County, New Jersey, on a lot of his own, on the other side of the Street, which he was occupying in February, 1730–51. He advertised the place for sale in September, 1753, describing the lot as "containing three acres, subject to Five Pounds a year ground rent, the house is new and well finished, and very convenient for a tavern (one being kept in it now), or any other public business, being well situated, and near where the college is to be built." He was then living in Trenton, New Jersey. He was probably a tavern keeper. He seems to have been again occupying the premises in 1761, and as late as 1767.

4. Phoebe Mounteer (otherwise Phebe Monteer) born in New Jersey, United States March 3, 1744, and died in Mason County, Kentucky, United States in 1818. Her father may be Luke Montier or William Mountere.

Barbados

1. Robert Mounteer (or Mounter), living in Barbados in 1653. He owned twelve acres of land in St. Thomas Parish, Barbados and 5 slaves in 1679. He may have been the father of John Mounteer.

2. John Mounteer (probably Mounter, Mountere, or Montier), a soldier, living in Barbados in 1679. His father was probably Robert Mounter, and his son may have been James Mounteer.

3. James Mounteer (probably Mounter, Mountere, or Montier), a mariner, living in Saint Michael, Barbados in 1717. He married Anne Hampleton (probably a spelling of Hamilton) on February 12, 1719, in St. James Parish, Barbados. James Mounteer was the captain of the Prosperity of Glasgow, a ship that traded goods between Glasgow, Scotland, and Virginia, United States, in 1732, and the Pelican of Saltcoats, a ship that traded goods between Saltcoats, Scotland, and Barbados in 1734.

Possible connections

Anthony Mounteer may be the son of James Mounteer. James Mounteer is the earliest recorded person with the spelling Mounteer, Anthony was the second. Anthony was probably born about 1725. At this time James Mounteer was captain of a ship taking goods between Scotland and Barbados, a route that would have included Liverpool. By 1746, Anthony was working as a mariner. In addition, Anthony named his second son John and his third son James. John Mounter was James Mounteer's father, which would make him Anthony Mounteer's grandfather.

== Notable people with the surname "Mounteer" ==
- Robert Mounteer - a charter member of the Migisi Opawgan Lodge of the Great Lakes Council (Boy Scouts of America)
- Jules Mounteer - member of Captain Tractor
- Tom Mounteer - chairman of the board of directors, Federal City Performing Arts Association
- Donald Edwin Mounteer – brigadier general, Canadian Forces
- Bill Mounteer - engineer at Lendio
