= Belchalwell Street =

Village in Dorset, England

Coordinates: 50.88°N 02.29°W

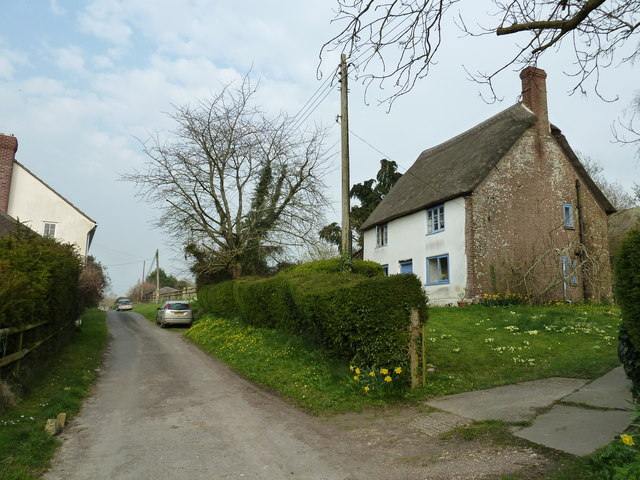
- Thatched cottage in Belchalwell Street

- Location within Dorset
- OS grid reference: ST7909
- Unitary authority: Dorset
- Ceremonial county: Dorset
- Region: South West
- Country: England
- Sovereign state: United Kingdom
- Police: Dorset
- Fire: Dorset and Wiltshire
- Ambulance: South Western

Belchalwell Street is a village in Dorset, England, at the foot of Bell Hill, generally included in the village of Belchalwell.
