= Blandford Forest =

Forest in Blandford Forum, England

- Location within Dorset
- Interactive map of Blandford Forest

Geography
- Location: Dorset, Dorset Downs, England
- OS grid: ST833068
- Coordinates: 50.861°N 2.238°W
- Elevation: 147.4 m (484 ft)

Blandford Forest is a scattered area of woodland centred to the northwest of the town of Blandford Forum in Dorset, England.

== Location ==
According to the Forestry Commission, Blandford Forest comprises a number of scattered woodlands around the village of Winterborne Stickland, including Whatcombe Wood and France Down.

== History ==
The Forest has one scheduled archaeological site: the ancient earthwork of Crossdyke on Okeford Hill near Shillingstone.
