= Shillingstone =

Village in Dorset, England

Coordinates: 50.9001°N 2.2501°W

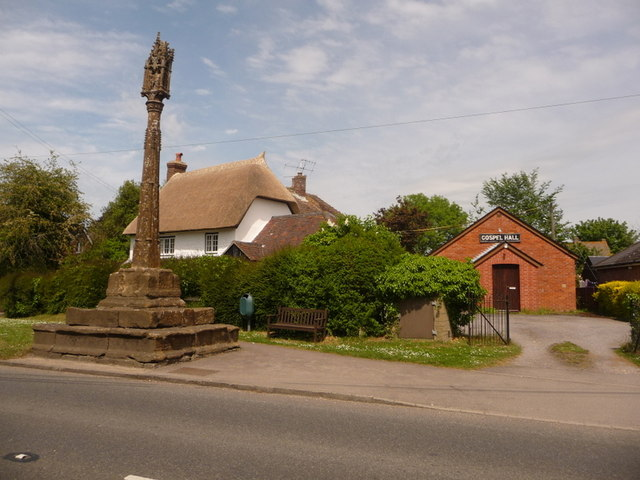
- Gospel Hall and cross, Shillingstone

- Location within Dorset
- Population: 1,165 (2021)
- OS grid reference: ST825112
- Civil parish: Shillingstone
- Unitary authority: Dorset
- Ceremonial county: Dorset
- Region: South West
- Country: England
- Sovereign state: United Kingdom
- Post town: Blandford Forum
- Postcode district: DT11
- Dialling code: 01258
- Police: Dorset
- Fire: Dorset and Wiltshire
- Ambulance: South Western
- UK Parliament: North Dorset
- Website: http://www.shillingstone.info

Shillingstone /ˈʃɪlɪŋstən/ is a village and civil parish in the Blackmore Vale area of north Dorset, England, situated on the River Stour between Sturminster Newton and Blandford Forum. In the 2021 census the civil parish had 503 households and a population of 1,165.

South of Shillingstone is a large area of woodland on Okeford and Shillingstone Hill which forms part of Blandford Forest.

== History ==
Shillingstone features in the Domesday Book of 1086 as a settlement of 46 households, with meadow, woodlands and a mill, under the lordship of Ascelin. Its name is a derivation of Eschelling's (or Ascelin's) town. It once had the tallest maypole in Dorset – 86 feet (26 metres) high. An agricultural community, it specialised in the production of moss.

In the First World War, it earned the title "the bravest village in Britain", because of the high proportion of residents who volunteered to join the armed forces. In 1924 the Shillingstone lime works was started to extract lime from the chalk beds at Shillingstone Hill.

== Governance ==
At the lower tier of local government, Shillingstone has a parish council of nine members which meets monthly to discuss planning applications, maintenance of allotments and the local recreation ground, and other local amenities.

At the upper tier of local government, Shillingstone is in the Dorset unitary district. For elections to Dorset Council it is the most populous parish in the Blackmore Vale electoral ward.

For elections to the Parliament of the United Kingdom, Shillingstone is in the North Dorset constituency, which is currently represented by the Conservative Simon Hoare.

== Demographics ==
Census population of Shillingstone parish
Census	Population	Households	Source
2001	1,008	425	
2011	1,170	479	
2021	1,165	503	

== Parish church ==
The Church of the Holy Rood is a short distance away from the village and is of 12th-century origin, constructed in banded flint and ashlar masonry. It was enlarged in the 15th century and in the 19th century; George Frederick Bodley added the north aisle. The font is of the 12th century and the pulpit of the 17th. The hymn writer Edward Dayman was appointed rector of Shillingstone in 1842. About 150 metres (490 ft) south of the church is a medieval cross base.

== Transport ==
Shillingstone railway station still survives intact on the former line of the Somerset and Dorset Joint Railway, now part of the North Dorset Trailway. The station is one of the best-preserved on the Somerset and Dorset line since the railway's closure in 1966. It opened on Monday 31 August 1863 and closed just over a century later on Sunday 6 March 1966.

The station is undergoing extensive restoration by the Shillingstone Station Project, supported by the North Dorset Railway Trust. The village also had a light railway serving Shillingstone House, the postwar home of Sir Thomas Salt.

== Education ==
The village has a primary school, affiliated to the Church of England and is also home to independent special school, The Forum School. Until 31 August 1997, Shillingstone was the location of the now-defunct girls' boarding school, Croft House School. The independent Hanford School is also near the village.
