= Plush, Dorset =

Village in England

Coordinates: 50.8183°N 2.4068°W

Plush
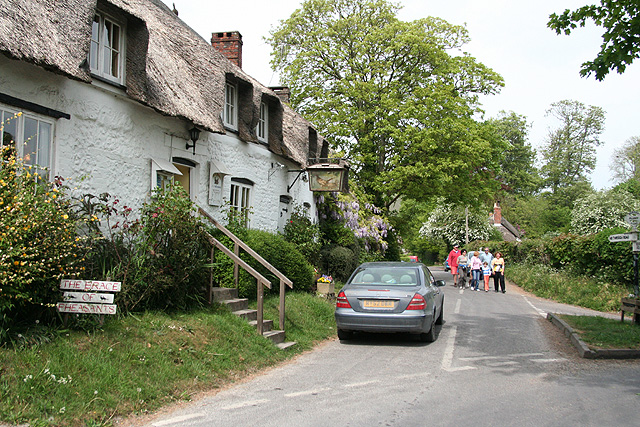
- The Brace Of Pheasants public house, Plush

- Location within Dorset
- OS grid reference: ST715022
- Unitary authority: Dorset
- Ceremonial county: Dorset
- Region: South West
- Country: England
- Sovereign state: United Kingdom
- Police: Dorset
- Fire: Dorset and Wiltshire
- Ambulance: South Western

Plush is a small village in the English county of Dorset. It lies within the civil parish of Piddletrenthide in the west of the county, and is approximately 8 miles (13 km) north of the county town Dorchester. It is sited in a small side-valley of the River Piddle at an altitude of 130 metres (430 ft) and is surrounded by chalk hills which rise to 251 metres (823 ft) at Ball Hill, a kilometre to the northeast, and 261 metres (856 ft) at Lyscombe Hill, 2½ kilometres to the east.

Plush consists of a few thatched cottages, a public house, a Regency manor house and a small church dedicated to St John the Baptist; the church was designed in 1848 by Benjamin Ferrey, a Gothic Revival architect and close friend of Pugin.

== See also ==
- Music at Plush
