= Ball Hill, Dorset =

Ball Hill
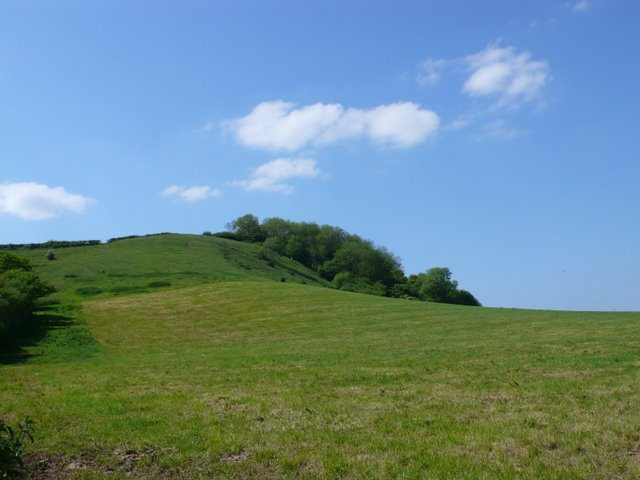
- Ball Hill seen from Folly where the Wessex Ridgeway crosses the road between Plush and Mappowder

Highest point
- Elevation: 251 m (823 ft)
- Prominence: 74 m (243 ft)
- Parent peak: Lewesdon Hill
- Listing: Hills of Dorset
- Coordinates: 50°49′48″N 2°23′49″W

Geography
- Location within Dorset Location within England
- Location: Dorset, England
- Parent range: Dorset Downs
- OS grid: ST721034
- Topo map: OS Landranger 194

At 251 metres, Ball Hill is one of the highest hills in the county of Dorset, England, and is on the Wessex Ridgeway.

== Location ==
The summit of Ball Hill lies at the eastern end of a short ridge running from east to west. Its lower, western end is known as Church Hill. To the south a short spur drops steeply to the hamlet of Plush in Watcombe Bottom. To the north the land descends more gradually to the vale of Lydden. The hill is about 4 kilometres southeast of Buckland Newton, 6 kilometres west-northwest of Cerne Abbas and 9 kilometres west of Milton Abbas. Other prominent hills in the vicinity include Lyscombe Hill (261 m) to the southeast on the other side of the hamlet of Folly.

== History ==
There is evidence of prehistoric settlement on almost every hill in the vicinity, with a hill fort on Nettlecombe Tout (a spur of Lyscombe Hill) to the east, cross dykes and tumuli on the flanks of Lyscombe Hill to the southeast and a tumulus and field system on Church Hill to the west.
