= Weymouth Lowlands =

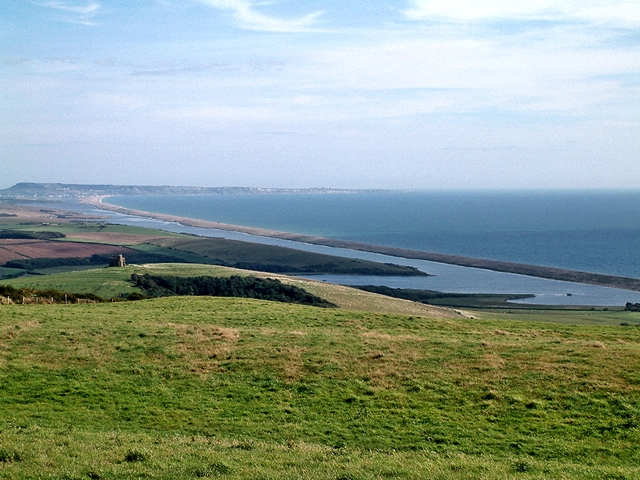
View of Chesil Beach and The Fleet

The Weymouth Lowlands form a natural region on the south coast of England in the county of Dorset. Much of the area lies within the Dorset National Landscape.

According to Natural England, who have designated the Weymouth Lowlands as National Character Area 138, they cover an area of 132.5 square kilometres (51.2 sq mi); a coastal strip between about 1 and 6 kilometres wide, running from the Bride Valley west of Burton Bradstock, to east of Osmington. It includes the town of Weymouth, the main settlement of the area.

The coastline of the Weymouth Lowlands is dominated by Chesil Beach, which hugs the littoral grasslands in the west before separating from the mainland in the east to form The Fleet, a series of brackish lagoons, and then continuing as a narrow causeway linking the mainland with the Isle of Portland. In the hinterland there are long, rounded, often bare, hogsback ridges interspersed with broad, clay vales. Arable farming predominates. Apart from the town of Weymouth, settlement is sparse and the few villages are small and compact. In the west the landscape is more varied, wooded and undulating than the eastern part of the Lowlands. The height of the land rises from 0.2 metres (0.66 ft) below sea level to around 208 metres (682 ft).

The steep chalk escarpment of the South Dorset Ridgeway marks the transition to the Dorset Downs National Character Area to the north. South of the area is the Isle of Portland and east of the area is the Isle of Purbeck.
