= St Aldhelm's Church, Belchalwell =

Church in Dorset, England

Church of St Aldhelm, Belchalwell
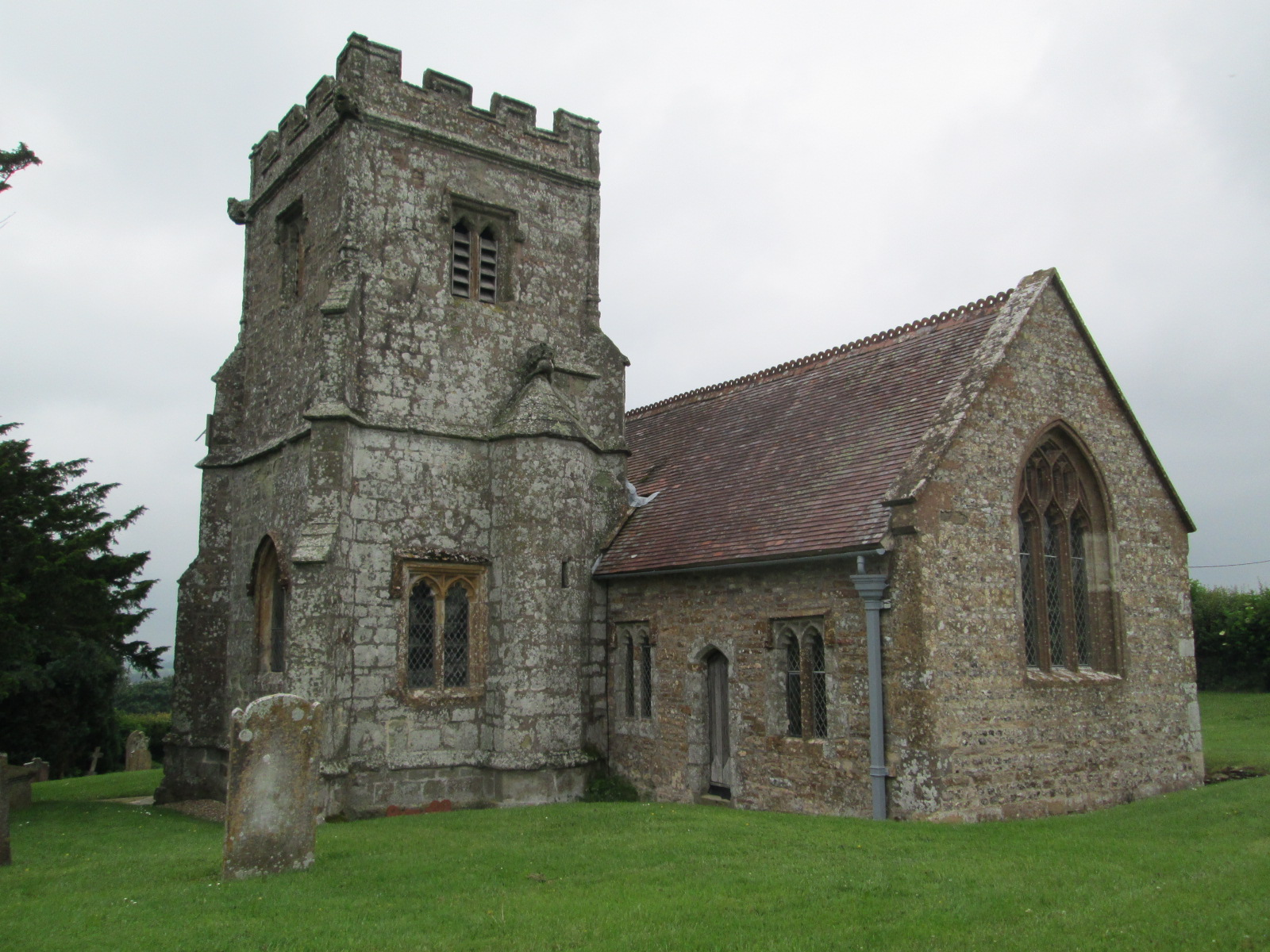
- View from the south-east
- Church of St Aldhelm, Belchalwell
- 50°53.2305′N 2°17.7960′W
- OS grid reference: ST 792 097
- Location: Belchalwell
- Country: England
- Denomination: Church of England

History
- Dedication: Saint Aldhelm

Architecture
- Heritage designation: Grade II*
- Designated: 4 October 1960

Administration
- Diocese: Diocese of Salisbury
- Deanery: Blackmore Vale Deanery

St Aldhelm's Church is a Grade II* listed Anglican church in the village of Belchalwell, Dorset. It is in the ecclesiastical parish of Belchalwell, which is part of the Benefice of Hazelbury Bryan and the Hillside Parishes.

The church is situated on higher ground above Belchalwell village. The oldest parts of the church are of the 12th century; much of the building is of the 15th century.

== Saint Aldhelm ==
There being no trace of the original dedication, after church records were lost in a fire in 1731, the church was dedicated in 1959 to Saint Aldhelm.

Saint Aldhelm (c.639–709) was a notable scholar in Wessex in the time of King Ine; he was appointed the first Abbot of Malmesbury c.675, and became the first Bishop of Sherborne in 705.

== History and description ==
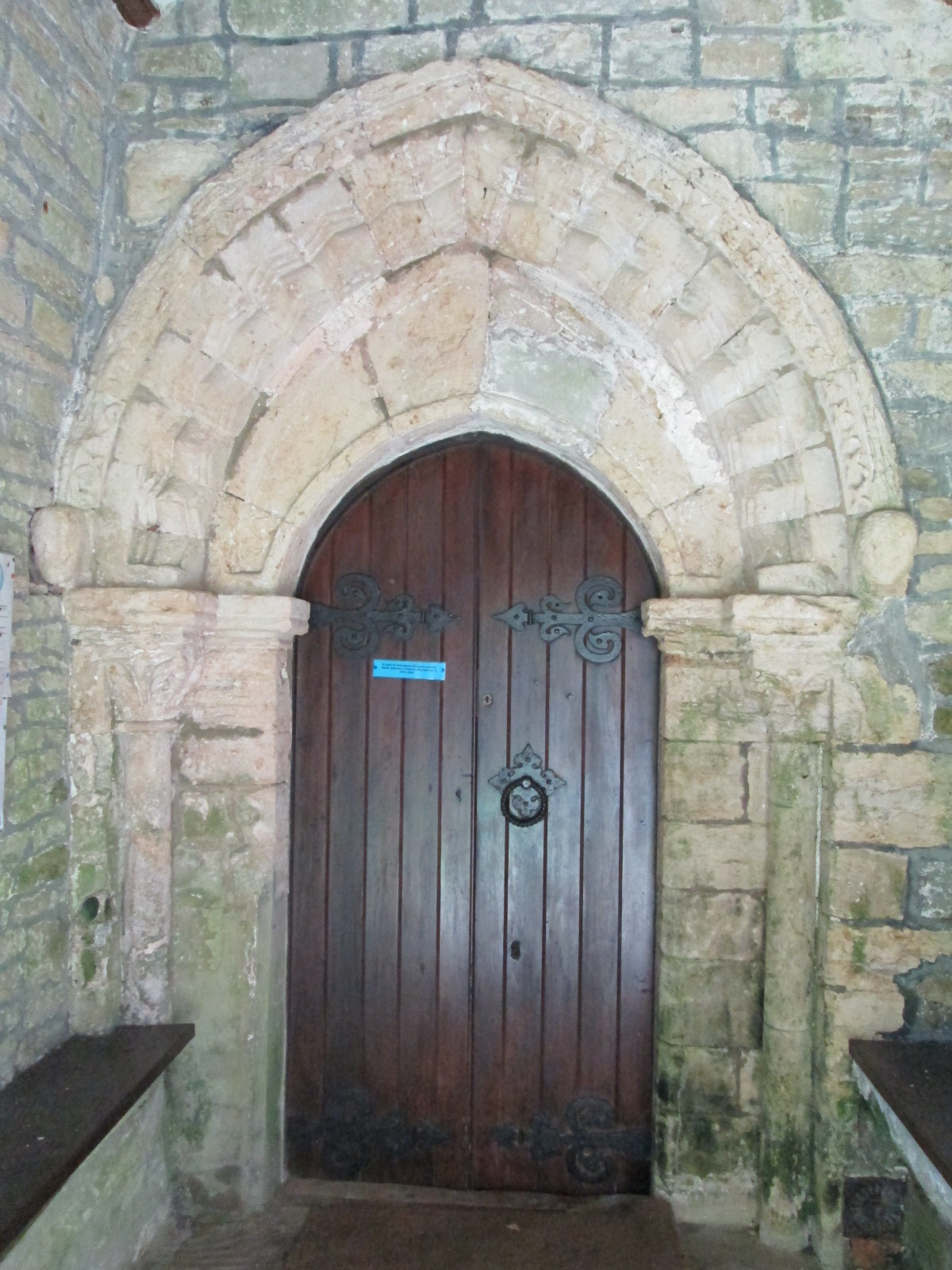
The doorway in the south porch, showing the decorated Norman arch

The nave is the oldest surviving part of the church; the south wall dates from the late 12th century. There is no south aisle; the south doorway, which leads directly to the nave, is from this early period, having a well-preserved semi-circular Norman arch decorated with chevron patterns and terminating in head-stops.

Most of the rest of the church is of the 15th century: the porch, the tower (built on the south of the church, adjoining the porch), the nave arcade, north aisle and the chancel. The tower has two stages and a parapet with battlements. It has gargoyles at the corners of the parapet string course, and a sundial (probably added later) on the south-west buttress of the tower.

In the late 19th century the north aisle, the east wall of the chancel and the west wall of the nave were rebuilt.
