= King's Stag Memorial Chapel =

Church in Dorset, England

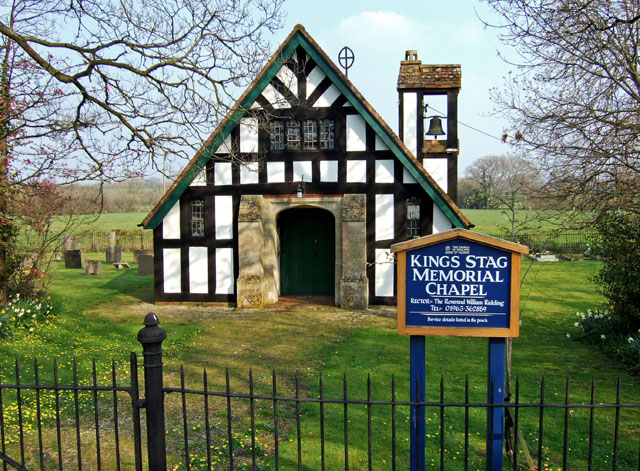

Religion
- Affiliation: Church of England
- Ecclesiastical or organizational status: Active

Location
- Location: King's Stag, Dorset, England
- Interactive map of King's Stag Memorial Chapel
- Coordinates: 50.8985°N 2.3919°W

Architecture
- Type: Church
- Completed: 1914
- Capacity: 60

King's Stag Memorial Chapel is a Church of England chapel in King's Stag, Dorset, England.

== History ==
The memorial chapel at King's Stag was built in 1914 at the expense of the Right Rev. Huyshe Yeatman-Biggs, the Bishop of Worcester, in memory of his wife, Lady Barbara Yeatman-Biggs, who died in 1909. Prior to its construction, a small mission room had served the hamlet. At the time, the churchyards at both Stock Gaylard and Lydlinch were full, and the Bishop also believed a chapel would benefit parishioners when journeying to a parish church was difficult, such as in bad weather.

The site of the chapel, approximately a quarter of an acre, was gifted by the Bishop's son, Mr. Lewis Yeatman. Its position spanned two ecclesiastical parishes, with the chapel and part of the burial ground belonging to that of Stock Gaylard, while the rest of the ground was based in Lydlinch. The foundation stone was laid by Lady Octavia Legge, the sister of Lady Yeatman-Biggs, on 1 August 1914. The chapel was built by Mr. R. G. Spiller of Sherborne. The chapel's bell was gifted by Miss E. F. E. Yeatman.

== Architecture ==
The chapel is approximately 40 feet in length and 18 feet wide. It is built of brick, with cement rendering and half-timbered framing using oak, and a tiled roof. The porch is built of Bath stone. The west side of the chapel has a small vestry and adjoining store room which was designed for the bier, coal and other stores.
