= All Saints Church, Nether Cerne =

Church in Dorset, England

All Saints Church
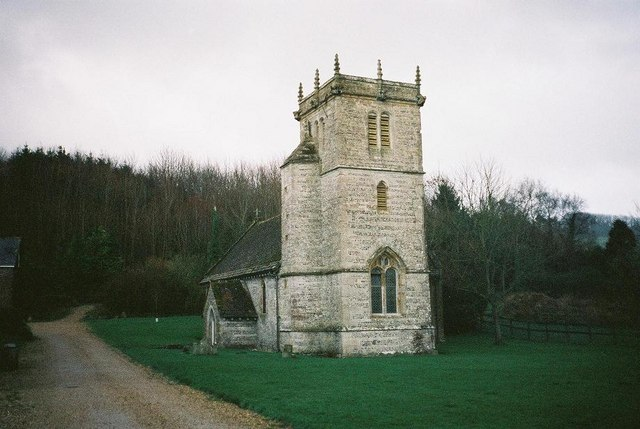

- Location within Dorset
- 50°46′56.9″N 2°28′10.6″W
- Location: Nether Cerne, Dorset, England

History
- Built: late 13th century

Listed Building – Grade I
- Official name: Church of All Saints
- Designated: 26 January 1956
- Reference no.: 1216512

All Saints Church in Nether Cerne, Dorset, England was built in the late 13th century. It is recorded in the National Heritage List for England as a designated Grade I listed building, and is a redundant church in the care of the Churches Conservation Trust. It was declared redundant on 1 December 1971, and was vested in the Trust on 8 March 1973.

The church and adjacent manor house are built of bands of flint and stone. Most of the church dates from the 13th century, although the tower, with its pinnacles and gargoyle, and porch were added in the 15th.

The interior of the church includes a melon-shaped 12th century font, believed to date from an earlier church on the same site.

== See also ==
- List of churches preserved by the Churches Conservation Trust in South West England
