= Bishop's Caundle =

Village in Dorset, England

Coordinates: 50.91554°N 2.43697°W

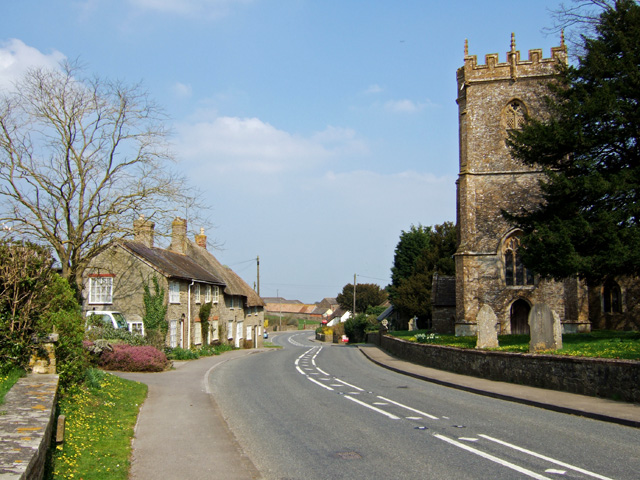
- Bishop's Caundle

- Location within Dorset
- Population: 390
- OS grid reference: ST693129
  - London: 129 miles (208 km)
- Civil parish: Bishop's Caundle
- Unitary authority: Dorset
- Ceremonial county: Dorset
- Region: South West
- Country: England
- Sovereign state: United Kingdom
- Post town: Sherborne
- Postcode district: DT9
- Dialling code: 01963
- Police: Dorset
- Fire: Dorset and Wiltshire
- Ambulance: South Western
- UK Parliament: West Dorset

Bishop's Caundle is a village and civil parish in Dorset, South West England. It is situated 6 miles (9.7 km) south-east of Sherborne. The local travel links are located 4 miles (6.4 km) from the village to Sherborne railway station and 28 miles (45 km) to Bournemouth Airport. The main road running through the village is the A3030, connecting Lydlinch to Sherborne. Dorset County Council's 2013 mid-year estimate of the population of the civil parish is 390.

== History ==
Older documents sometimes refer to the village as Caundle Bishop, although the origin of the name is unclear.

The original settlements that are still present within Bishop's Caundle parish are Bishop's Caundle and Wake Caundle. Until 1886 the parish contained parts of the neighbouring parish of Caundle Marsh, and there were parts of Bishop's Caundle parish within Caundle Marsh and Folke parishes.

Cornford Bridge over Caundle Brook dates from around 1480 and is one of less than 200 medieval multi-span bridges to survive in England.

According to Douglas Adams' humorous 1983 dictionary "The Meaning of Liff", a Bishop's Caundle is "An opening gambit before a game of chess whereby the missing pieces are replaced by small ornaments from the mantelpiece."

== Governance ==
In the United Kingdom national parliament, Bishop's Caundle is in the West Dorset parliamentary constituency, which is currently represented by Edward Morello of the Liberal Democrats. In local government, Bishop's Caundle is governed by Dorset Council at the highest tier, and Bishop's Caundle Parish Council at the lowest tier.

In national parliament and local council elections, Dorset is divided into several electoral wards. In county council elections, Bishop's Caundle is in Sherborne Rural Electoral Division, one of 42 divisions that elect councillors to Dorset County Council.

== Religious sites ==
The team rector asserts that parish church has no known dedication although many mistakenly confuse it with the church of St Peter and St Paul at Caundle Marsh a mile and a half away. Parts of the building date from the 14th century and it has been designated as a Grade I listed building. The parish is part of the Three Valleys benefice within the Diocese of Salisbury.
