= River Lydden =

River in Dorset, England

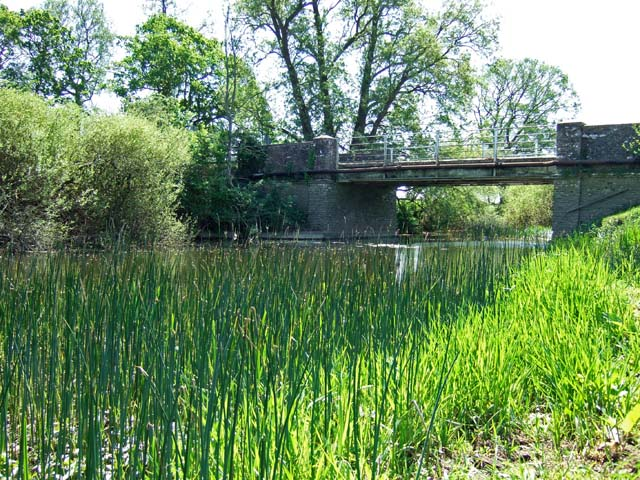
- River Lydden at Bagber Bridge

- Location within Dorset

Location
- Country: England
- County: Dorset

Physical characteristics
- Source: Buckland Newton
- Mouth: River Stour
  - coordinates: 50.9524°N 2.3336°W
- Length: 24.55 km (15.25 mi)

The River Lydden is a 15.25 miles (24.55 km) tributary of the River Stour that flows through Blackmore Vale in Dorset, England.

Its headwaters rise at the foot of the scarp slope of the Dorset Downs near Buckland Newton. These headwaters streams coalesce south of Pulham, from where the river flows north-east to it confluence with the Wonston Brook. Continuing in a northerly direction it passes King’s Stag, to Twoford bridge where it is crossed by the A357 between Lydlinch and Bagber, beyond which it meets its main tributary the Caundle Brook. The lower Lydden then flows beneath the listed Bagber Bridge where it is crossed by a minor road, to join the Stour near King’s Mill south west of Marnhull.

== See also ==
- List of rivers of England
