= Belchalwell =

Village in Dorset, England

Coordinates: 50.8866°N 2.2985°W

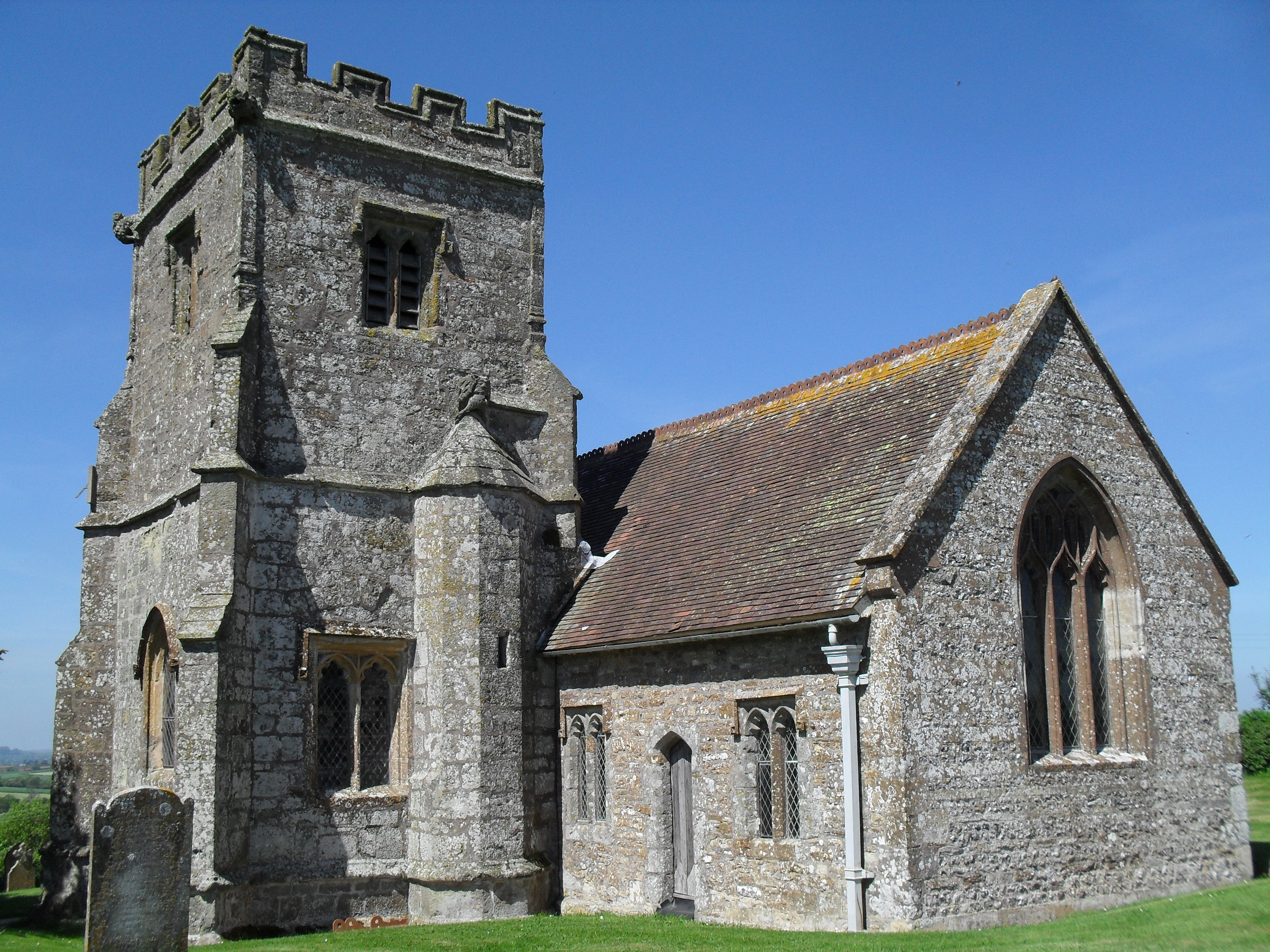
- St Aldhelm's Church, Belchalwell

- Location within Dorset
- OS grid reference: ST791097
- Civil parish: Okeford Fitzpaine
- Unitary authority: Dorset
- Ceremonial county: Dorset
- Region: South West
- Country: England
- Sovereign state: United Kingdom
- Police: Dorset
- Fire: Dorset and Wiltshire
- Ambulance: South Western

Belchalwell is a small village and former civil parish, now in the parish of Okeford Fitzpaine in the Blackmore Vale, in the Dorset district, in the ceremonial county of Dorset, England. It lies 2 1/2 miles (4 kilometres) south of Sturminster Newton and 6 miles (10 kilometres) northwest of Blandford Forum. Belchalwell Street is sited on Upper Greensand, with Lower Belchalwell on the boundary of Gault and Kimmeridge Clay, both beneath the north slopes of Bell Hill, part of the Dorset Downs. In 1881 the parish had a population of 169. On 25 March 1885 the parish was abolished and merged with Okeford Fitzpaine and Fifehead Neville.

Belchalwell is Saxon in origin, with a medieval church, St Aldhelm's Church, much renovated. The name of the village describes a cold well on a hillside. The village has approximately 30 properties with fewer than a hundred residents, and is much reduced in size from former times, largely due to reductions in agricultural employment, which has always been the primary industry. One former resident was the TV personality Jack Hargreaves.
