= Bookham =

Bookham may refer to:

== Places ==
=== Australia ===
- Bookham, New South Wales

=== United Kingdom ===
==== Dorset ====
- Bookham, Dorset
- Bookham Knoll, an elevation near Buckland Newton

==== Surrey ====
- Great Bookham
  - Bookham railway station
- Little Bookham
- Bookham Commons
- Bookham Lodge, a historic manor house near Stoke d'Abernon

== Other uses ==
- Bookham F.C., a football club in Great Bookham, England
- Bookham Inc., later Oclaro, an American manufacturer of optical components
