= Music at Plush =

British music festival

Plush Festival is a concert series that takes place each summer in the village of Plush, situated in the county of Dorset, southwest England. The festival runs over selected weekends from June to September and features programmes of classical, contemporary and jazz music. It has a resident Plush Ensemble.

== History ==
Plush Festival was founded in 1995 by the conductor William Lacey and the cellist Adrian Brendel, who is the festival's music director, and son of Alfred Brendel. Starting as an informal chamber music performance, it has since developed into a concert series. Concerts take place in the former church of St John the Baptist, restored from dereliction in 1992 and transformed into a concert hall and recording studio. The musicians live and rehearse in the manor house nearby. Over the past fourteen years the music of some 80 composers has been performed by over 100 musicians from around the world, including notable premieres from Harrison Birtwistle and Kit Armstrong.

== Programmes ==
Recent seasons have included premieres de:Georg Kröll (2006); Lieder programmes from Mark Padmore and Till Fellner; appearances from the Kuss, Vertavo String Quartet and Szymanowski Quartets; piano recitals by Paul Lewis, Aleksandar Madzar, Nicholas Angelich and Alfred Brendel (in his final performing year, 2008); and concerts by the John Taylor Trio, Ensemble Raro, and the resident Plush Ensemble.
