= Lydlinch =

Village and civil parish in Dorset, England

Coordinates: 50.9204°N 2.3665°W

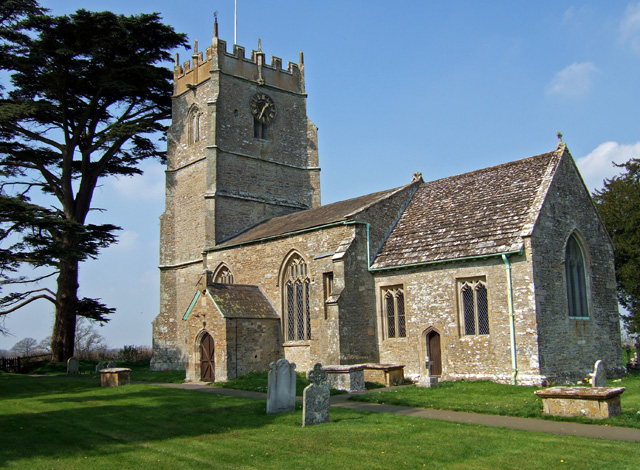
- Parish Church of St Thomas Becket

- Location within Dorset
- Population: 437 (2011)
- OS grid reference: ST743135
- Civil parish: Lydlinch
- Unitary authority: Dorset
- Ceremonial county: Dorset
- Region: South West
- Country: England
- Sovereign state: United Kingdom
- Post town: STURMINSTER NEWTON
- Postcode district: DT10
- Dialling code: 01963
- Police: Dorset
- Fire: Dorset and Wiltshire
- Ambulance: South Western
- UK Parliament: North Dorset

Lydlinch is a village and civil parish in the Blackmore Vale in north Dorset, England, about three miles (five kilometres) west of Sturminster Newton. The village is sited on Oxford clay close to the small River Lydden. The parish – which includes the village of King's Stag to the south and Stock Gaylard House to the west – is bounded by the Lydden to the east and its tributary, the Caundle Brook, to the north.

At the 2021 census, the parish had a population of 442 people living in 205 households.

At King's Stag is the King's Stag Memorial Chapel which was built in 1914 at the expense of the Right Rev. Huyshe Yeatman-Biggs, the Bishop of Worcester, in memory of his wife, Lady Barbara Yeatman-Biggs, who died in 1909.

== Governance ==
At the lower tier of local government, Lydlinch is a civil parish with a parish council of five elected members.

At the upper tier, Lydlinch is in the Dorset unitary authority. For elections to Dorset Council is it in the Blackmore Vale electoral ward.

Historically, Lydlinch was in Sturminster Rural District from 1894 to 1974, and North Dorset district from 1974 to 2019.

For elections to the Parliament of the United Kingdom, Lydlinch is in North Dorset constituency.

== Parish church ==
The Church of England parish church of St Thomas Becket has a 12th-century baptismal font, but the rest of the building is Perpendicular Gothic. The nave, chancel and west tower are 15th century. The north aisle and south porch were added in the 16th century. In the 19th century the north aisle was rebuilt and the north vestry added and the building was twice restored, the second time in 1875. The church is a Grade II* listed building.

The tower has a ring of five bells. The 19th-century Dorset dialect poet William Barnes (1801–86), who was born just outside the parish in nearby Bagber, wrote of them "Vor Lydlinch bells be good vor sound, And liked by all the neighbours round". Thomas Purdue of Closworth, Somerset cast the second, fourth and tenor bells in 1681. Mears & Stainbank of the Whitechapel Bell Foundry recast the treble and third bells in 1908.

The parish is part of the Benefice of Sturminster Newton, Hinton St Mary and Lydlinch.
