= Dogbury Hill =

One of the highest hills in Dorset, England

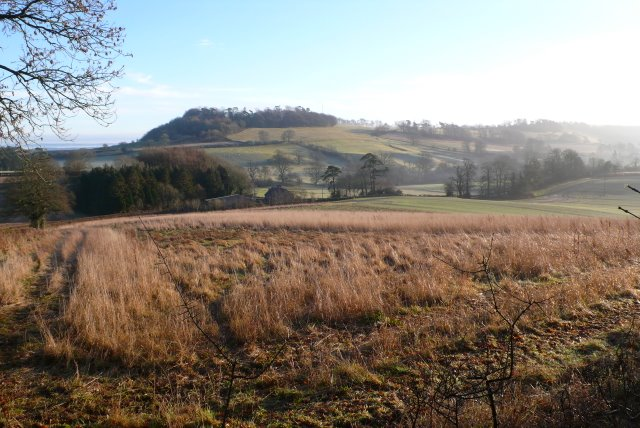
- View over the countryside near Minterne Magna looking east towards Dogbury Hill

Highest point
- Elevation: 248 m (814 ft)
- Prominence: 13 m (43 ft) (est.)
- Parent peak: Watts Hill
- Coordinates: 50°50′41.06″N 2°28′48.49″W

Geography
- Location within Dorset
- Location: Dorset, England
- Parent range: Dorset Downs
- OS grid: ST660052
- Topo map: OS Landranger 194

At 248 metres (814 ft), Dogbury Hill is one of the highest hills in the county of Dorset, England. It is the site of a prehistoric hill fort.

== Location ==
Dogmore Hill rises just a few hundred yards north of the village of Minterne Magna in the Blackmore Vale and east of the A352 about 14 kilometres from Dorchester. Its summit area is covered by the Dogmore Plantation and a lane runs over the hill and along the ridge to the southeast, passing close to the summit. There is a bridleway running roughly east to west across its northern flank and along the edge of the plantation. Nearby are the other eminences of Telegraph Hill, High Stoy and Gore Hill.

== Rivers and streams ==
The River Cerne rises in the shadow of High Stoy and Dogbury Hill, its actual source being a damp hollow in the steep valley head above Minterne Magna. On the other side of Dogbury is the source of the Caundle Brook, near Clinger Farm, the chief tributary of the Lydden.

At Dogbury Hill there is an ancient enclosure.

== Dogbury Gate ==
Dogbury Gate (ST669044) is a miniature pass at the head of the Cerne Valley taking the main A352 over to the clay lowlands of the Blackmore Vale.

== Films ==
The area of Minterne, Dogbury Hill and High Stoy was the setting for Thomas Hardy's novel, The Woodlanders, Minterne House being referred to as Great Hintock House. The 1990s TV film of Hardy's Tess of the d'Urbervilles was made on Dogbury Hill.
