= Edward Dayman =

Edward Arthur Dayman, BD, (11 July 1807 – 30 October 1890) was an English clergyman and hymn writer.

== Life ==
Dayman was born at Padstow in Cornwall, the third son of John Dayman, of Mambury in Devon, and educated at Blundell's School in Tiverton and at Exeter College in Oxford. He was awarded 1st Class in Lit. Hum (1829), BA (1830), MA (1831) and BD (1841). He was for some time fellow and tutor of his college, and pro-proctor in 1835.

Dayman took Holy Orders in 1835 and became successively examiner for University Scholarship for Latin, 1838; in Lit. Hum., 1838–1839, and 1841–1842, senior proctor of the university.

Dayman’s clerical appointments were:

- 1842 - Rector of Shillingstone in Dorset
- 1849 - Rural Dean
- 1852 - Proctor in Convocation
- 1862 - Hon. Canon of Bitton in Sarum Cathedral

== Works ==
Dayman’s works include “Modern Infidelity”, 1861, and “Essay on Inspiration”, 1864. He was joint editor with Lord Nelson and Canon (afterwards Bishop) Woodford of the Sarum Hymnal, 1868; which contains translations from the Latin, and original hymns by him; and with Canon Rich-Jones, of “Statula et Comuetudines Ecclesiae Cathedralis Sarisburiensis”, 1883. He also contributed several translations from the Latin to The Hymnary, 1872. He was for many years engaged in compiling an English Dictionary of Mediaeval Latin founded on Du Cange.

The original hymns contributed by Dayman to the Sarum Hymnal are as follows:

- Almighty Father, heaven and earth, q.v. (1867) Offertory.
- O Lord, be with us when we sail. (1865) For use at Sea.
- O Man of Sorrows, Thy prophetic eye. (1865) Tuesday before Easter.
- Sleep thy last sleep. (1868) Burial.
- Upon the solitary mountain's height. (1866) Transfiguration.
- When the messengers of wrath. (1867) During Pestilence and Famine.
- Who is this with garments dyed? (1866) Monday before Easter.

== Sources ==
- Hymnary.org, People › Dayman, Edward Arthur, 1807-1890 (from the Dictionary of Hymnology, 1907), Extracted 29 April 2010
- Bethany Lutheran College, Evangelical Lutheran Hymnary Handbook, Biographies and Sources, Extracted 29 April 2010
- Internet Archive, Open Library, The hymns and hymn writers of The Church Hymnary, John Brownlie, 1899, London
- A dictionary of hymnology, setting forth the origin and history of Christian hymns of all ages and nations, Dover Publications, John Julian,1907 on Google Books (see A Dictionary of Hymnology
- University of Glasgow, Link to manuscripts catalogue (collections relating to Edward Arthur Dayman)
