= Duntish =

Coordinates: 50.855577°N 2.436095°W

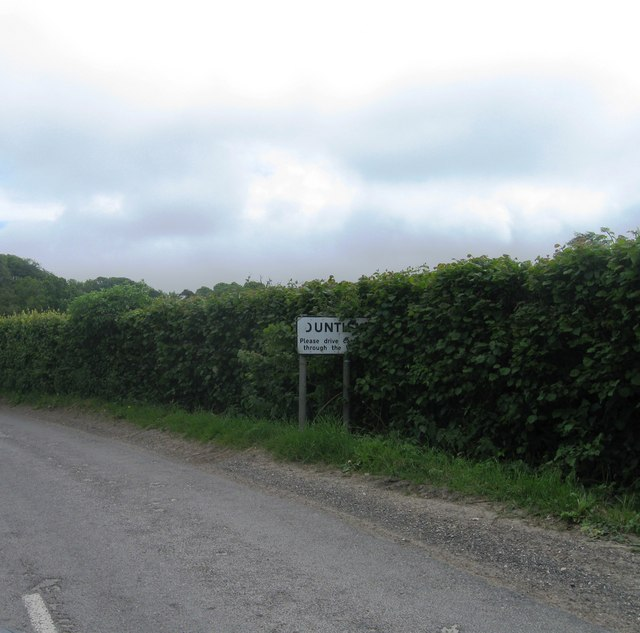
- Entrance sign to Duntish

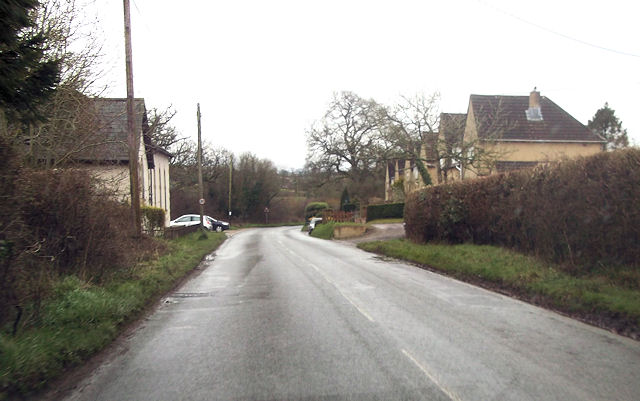
- Duntish village

- Location within Dorset
- Civil parish: Buckland Newton
- Unitary authority: Dorset
- Ceremonial county: Dorset
- Region: South West
- Country: England
- Sovereign state: United Kingdom
- Police: Dorset
- Fire: Dorset and Wiltshire
- Ambulance: South Western
- UK Parliament: North Dorset

Duntish is a village in the civil parish of Buckland Newton, in Dorset, England, in the Blackmore Vale region.

== History ==
In the 19th century, Duntish was a tithing in Buckland Newton parish. In 1830, Duntish was at the centre of the Swing Riots in Dorset.

Duntish Court was a country house demolished in 1965. Roman relics were discovered on site.

The village has a small church dating from the 13th century, St. Mary's, which is a Grade II listed building.

== Politics ==
For UK general elections, Duntish is part of the North Dorset constituency.

Locally, Duntish is part of the Chalk Valleys ward for elections to Dorset Council. From 1974 to 2019, it was in the West Dorset district.
