= Cosmore =

Village in Dorset, England

Coordinates: 50.849°N 2.462°W

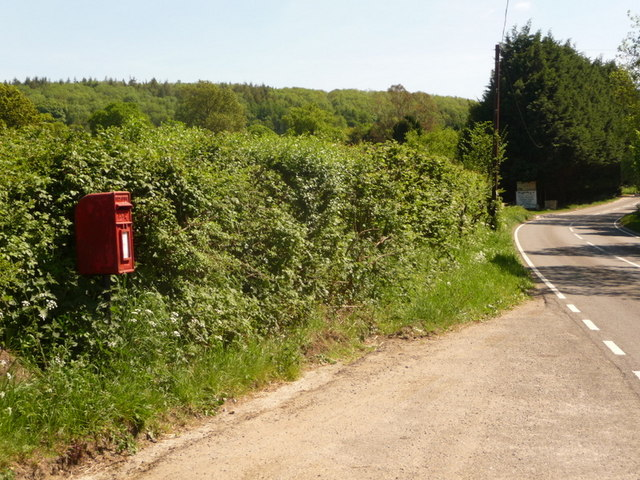
Cosmore: postbox No. DT2 148

Cosmore is a hamlet in Dorset, situated just off the main A352 Sherborne-Dorchester road. It sits at the foot of Dogbury Hill, one of Dorset's highest points. It is bounded by two minor rivers, to the East by the Caundle Brook, and to the west, the River Lydden.

There are 18 separate dwellings within the village, and the population is 45–50.

The village is located 9 miles North of the county town, Dorchester, and 11 miles south of the historic Abbey town of Sherborne.

Historic buildings include the 18th century Revel's Inn Farm which is reputed to be in one of Thomas Hardy's novels.
