= Lyscombe Hill =

Hill in Dorset, England

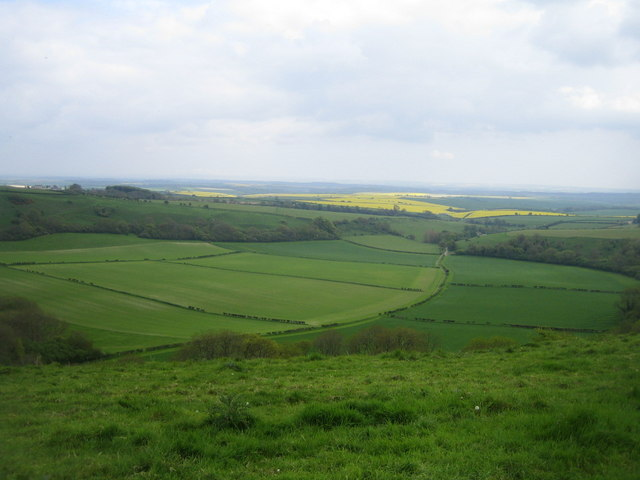
- View from Lyscombe Hill (at ~240m) looking south-east over Lyscombe Bottom.

Highest point
- Elevation: 262 m (860 ft)
- Prominence: 100 m (330 ft)
- Parent peak: Telegraph Hill
- Listing: HuMP
- Coordinates: 50°49′30″N 2°22′24″W

Geography
- Location: Dorset, England
- Parent range: Dorset Downs
- OS grid: ST738029
- Topo map(s): OS Landranger No. 194; Explorer No. 117E

Lyscombe Hill (262 metres, 860 feet high) is a hill near Melcombe Bingham about 14 kilometres north-northeast of Dorchester in the county of Dorset, England. It is part of the Dorset Downs and is listed as a so-called HuMP.

There is evidence of ancient settlement in the area, including tumuli, dykes and an Iron Age hillfort, known as Nettlecombe Tout (258 m), near the summit at grid reference ST 7368 0309, and at the end of the hill spur of the same name.

Nearby, on the summit ridge of the Dorset Downs, are Ball Hill to the west and the Dorsetshire Gap to the east.
