= Dorsetshire Gap =

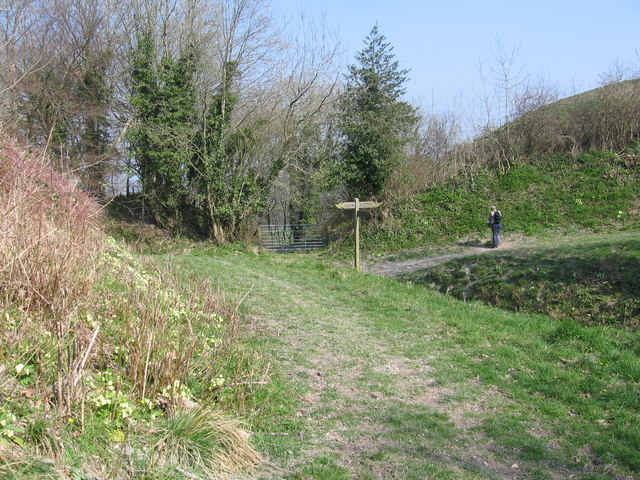
New signpost at the Dorsetshire Gap

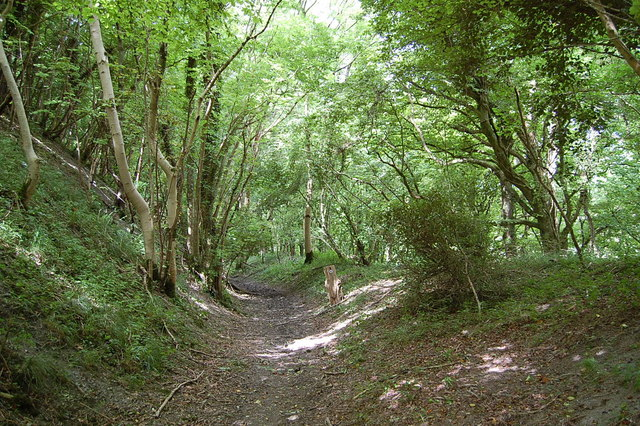
Bridleway heading NW from the Dorsetshire Gap

The Dorsetshire Gap, also called the Dorset Gap, is an important, historic track junction - once the hub of central Dorset in southern England - and a well known beauty spot and magnet for ramblers. It is located on the northern slopes of Lyscombe Hill and not far from the village of Melcombe Bingham in the vicinity of grid reference ST743031. It is 13 km west-northwest of Bere Regis.

Five ancient tracks, now bridleways, with steep, narrow, man-made cuttings, meet at the Dorsetshire Gap at the edge of the Higher Melcombe estate. The Gap was an important road crossing from the Middle Ages until the 19th century, linking the trails of the Ridgeway with the drove roads to the north. Travellers may originally have taken advantage of slight dips in the hillside to cross over the pass (mainly from northwest to southeast) and, over the centuries, these paths became worn into deep gullies.

All around this site is evidence of prehistoric and medieval settlement: hilltop cross dykes, barrows and traces of an incomplete Iron Age hill fort at Nettlecombe Tout and the remnants of a medieval settlement in the valley below.

== Hiking ==
The Dorsetshire Gap is on the Wessex Ridgeway between Iwerne Courtney and Sydling St Nicholas.
