= Minterne Magna =

Village in Dorset, England

Coordinates: 50.8369°N 2.4847°W

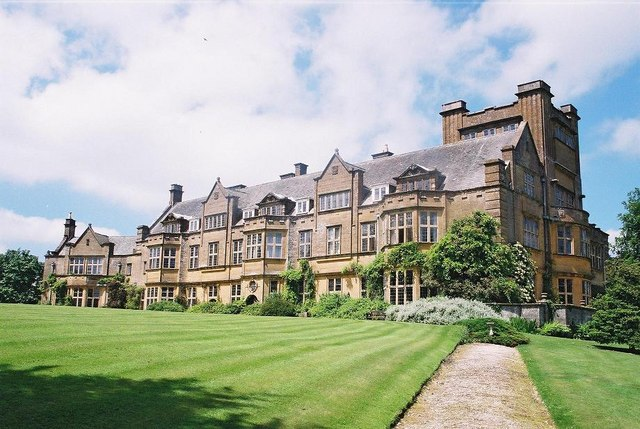
- Minterne House, south front

- Location within Dorset
- Population: 184
- OS grid reference: ST659042
- Unitary authority: Dorset
- Ceremonial county: Dorset
- Region: South West
- Country: England
- Sovereign state: United Kingdom
- Post town: Dorchester
- Postcode district: DT2
- Police: Dorset
- Fire: Dorset and Wiltshire
- Ambulance: South Western
- UK Parliament: West Dorset

Minterne Magna is a village and civil parish in Dorset, England, situated midway between Dorchester and Sherborne. In the 2011 census the parish had a population of 184. The village is sited near the source of the River Cerne among the chalk hills of the Dorset Downs. Some of the highest points in Dorset, including Telegraph Hill (267 m) and Dogbury Hill (248 m), are nearby.

St Andrew's Church contains the tombs of several members of the Napier family, who were Lords of the Manor from c.1600 to 1765.

== Minterne House ==
Minterne House is the ancestral home of the Digby family and earlier the Churchill family.

The estate was once owned by the Abbey of Cerne, from around the year 987, and, after the dissolution of the monasteries around 1539, it later passed to Winchester College who, in 1642, leased it to John Churchill, the father of the first Sir Winston Churchill (1620–88). The estate was later inherited by Sir Winston's son, Charles, who died without an heir, so the house went to his wife's family, the Goulds, who sold it to Admiral Robert Digby in 1768. Robert Digby's brother was Henry, 7th Baron Digby; Henry, who owned Sherborne Castle, was later created the 1st Earl Digby, in 1790. When Robert died in 1815, the house passed to his nephew, Sir Henry Digby, who later purchased the freehold from Winchester College in 1856. Sir Henry was a senior British naval officer, who served in the French Revolutionary and Napoleonic Wars in the Royal Navy and it was his wealth that established the original manor house, the bulk of which came from prize money. In 1799 he had been given command of the frigate HMS Alcmene, during which time he captured dozens of small merchant ships and had a hand in seizing the Spanish treasure frigates Santa Brigada and Thetis. The resulting prize fund was one of the richest ever recorded, the sterling value of the cargo was calculated as not less than £618,040 in 1799 (equivalent to £61,030,000 in 2025).

Sir Henry's daughter Jane Digby, the noted adventuress and mistress of Ludwig I of Bavaria, was also raised there along with her brother, the 9th Baron Digby.

In 1900 the house was found to be riddled with dry rot and was demolished and the current house, designed by Leonard Stokes, was built.

Pamela Digby Churchill Harriman (1920–1997), daughter of the 11th Baron Digby, was raised at the manor house from 1920 to 1938, and lived there before her marriage to Randolph Churchill in 1939.

Minterne House has a large woodland garden with many Rhododendron species, which runs in an elongated 'u' shape around the slopes of a small spur of land that stretches into the valley floor. Providing shade for the rhododendrons are many mature trees, including more unusual specimens such as Davidia involucrata ('handkerchief tree').
