= Huyshe Yeatman-Biggs =

English clergyman and bishop

The Right Reverend Huyshe Wolcott Yeatman-Biggs
- Bishop of Coventry
- Diocese: Coventry
- Installed: 1918
- Term ended: 1922
- Successor: Charles Lisle Carr
- Other posts: Bishop of Southwark (suffragan), in Rochester; Bishop of Worcester

Orders
- Ordination: 1869
- Consecration: 1891

Personal details
- Born: Huyshe Wolcott Yeatman; 2 February 1845 Dorset, England
- Died: 2 April 1922 (aged 77)
- Buried: Old Coventry Cathedral
- Denomination: Church of England
- Spouse: (1) Lady Barbara Legge; (2) Frances, dau. of 5th Viscount Barrington

Huyshe Wolcott Yeatman-Biggs (2 February 1845 – 14 April 1922; until 1898 known as Huyshe Wolcott Yeatman) was an influential Church of England clergyman who served as the only Bishop of Southwark to be a suffragan bishop (in the Diocese of Rochester), the 105th Bishop of Worcester and, latterly, as the inaugural bishop of the restored see of Coventry in the modern era.

Yeatman was born at Manston House, Dorset, the younger son of Harry Farr Yeatman JP by his marriage to Emma, daughter and heiress of Harry Biggs, of Stockton House, Wiltshire. He was educated at Winchester College and Emmanuel College, Cambridge, where he was a Dixie Scholar, and eventually (1905) an Honorary Fellow.

He was ordained in 1869 and after a curacy in Salisbury became chaplain to the bishop in 1875. That same year he married firstly Lady Barbara Legge, daughter of the 4th Earl of Dartmouth.

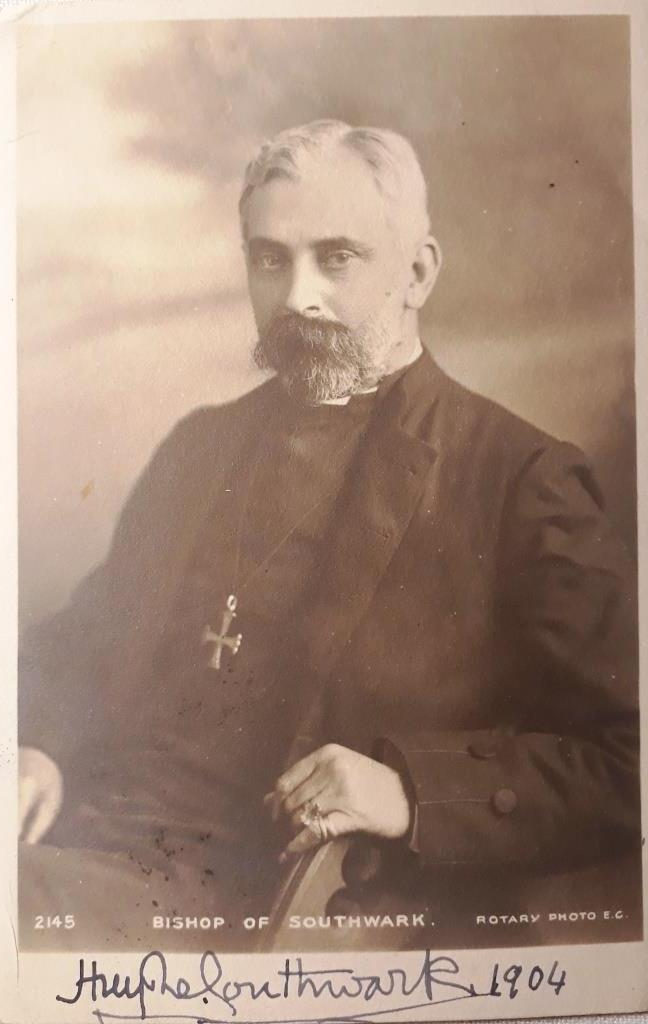
Rt Rev Huyshe Yeatman-Biggs, Bishop of Southwark (1904)

He was successively vicar of Netherbury and Sydenham before becoming Bishop of Southwark (a suffragan bishop in the Diocese of Rochester) in 1891. He was consecrated a bishop at St Paul's Cathedral on 29 September 1891, by Edward Benson, Archbishop of Canterbury. He was to hold that See for fourteen years before appointment as diocesan Bishop of Worcester in 1905.

During his years there, Yeatman-Biggs forged very close links with the Episcopal church in the United States. In 1898, he inherited the estate of his brother, Arthur Godolphin Yeatman-Biggs CB, and (as heir of his maternal grandfather) assumed the additional name of Biggs by Royal licence dates 6 August 1898.

In 1914 Yeatman-Biggs paid for the erection of the King's Stag Memorial Chapel in memory of his wife, who died in 1909.

During the Great War, Yeatman-Biggs put the whole of his official residence, Hartlebury Castle, ‘at the disposal of wounded soldiers’ He praised clergy not just for undertaking spiritual work in the War but also for labouring in the fields, in offices and in schools. He stayed in Coventry in July, 1917, and noted the influx of munitions workers including 7000 women working in one factory.

At the end of the War he made it clear that those who had been killed should be honoured equally. "I wish it could be agreed in every parish that, as far as the War is concerned, comradeship should be observed, that there should be no individual tablets, but that one memorial, outside or in, should be agreed on for the whole company of our faithful boys, with equal inscriptions, the richer friends bearing the greater cost, but claiming no advantage."

In 1918, he took on the task of reviving the Diocese of Coventry, during which time he came to national prominence when an unscrupulous adventurer accused him of influencing a vulnerable pensioner into leaving him her assets. Not only were the charges completely unfounded, the much smaller sum he had received was quite properly re-distributed to worthy Anglican causes.

After Yeatman-Biggs's death, a bronze effigy of him was commissioned from Hamo Thornycroft, and was the only artefact to survive more or less intact the bombing of Coventry Cathedral in 1940.

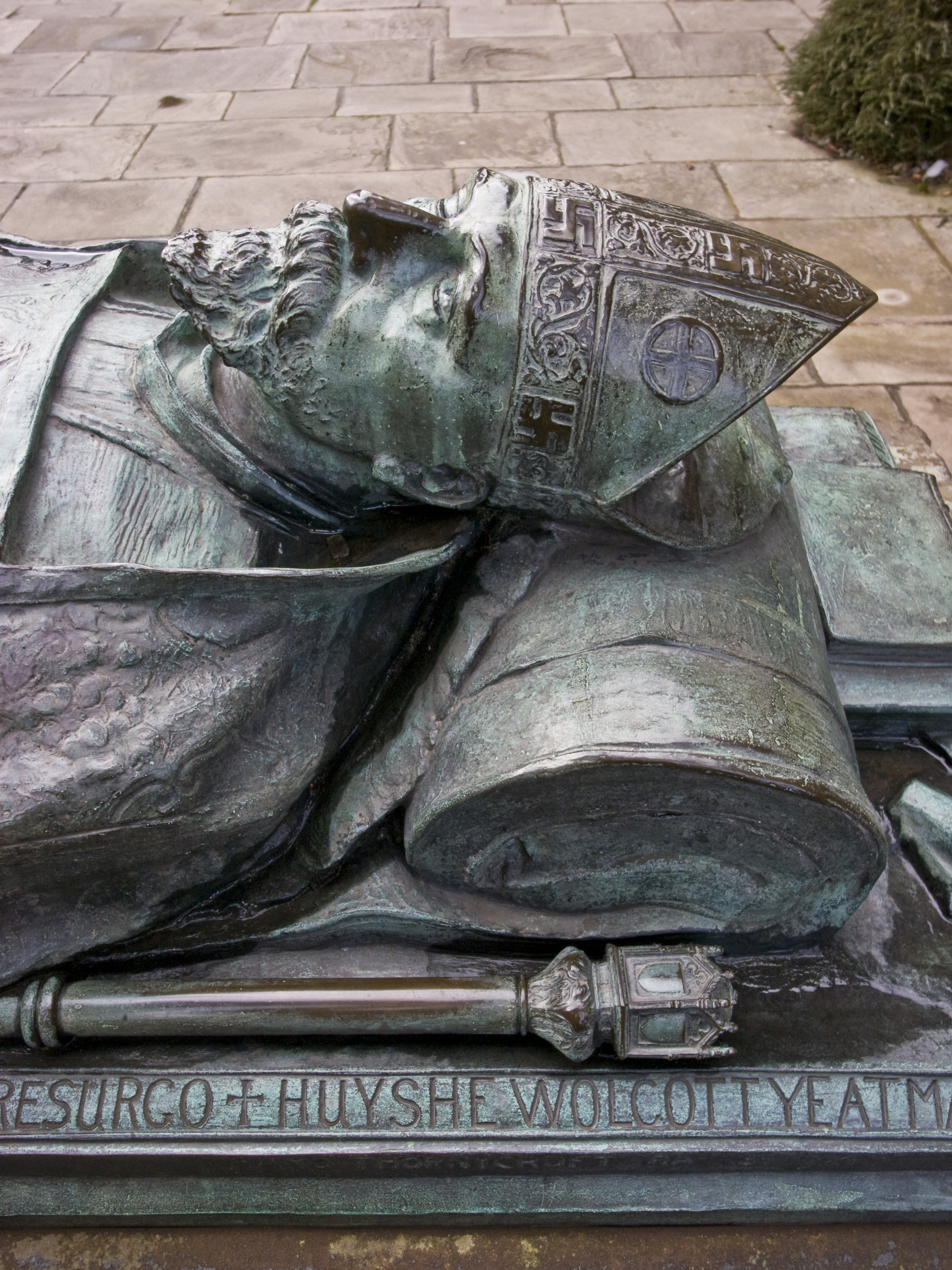
Effigy of Yeatman-Biggs

== Works ==
- The Efficiency and Inefficiency of a Diocese, London, SPCK, 1909
- Life in an English Diocese, London, SPCK, 1915

Church of England titles
New title	Bishop of Southwark; 1891 – 1905	Succeeded by Edward Stuart Talbot
Preceded by Charles Gore	Bishop of Worcester; 1905 – 1918	Succeeded by Ernest Pearce
New creation	Bishop of Coventry; 1918 – 1922	Succeeded by Charles Lisle Carr
