= Bell Hill, Dorset =

Hill in Dorset, England

Bell Hill
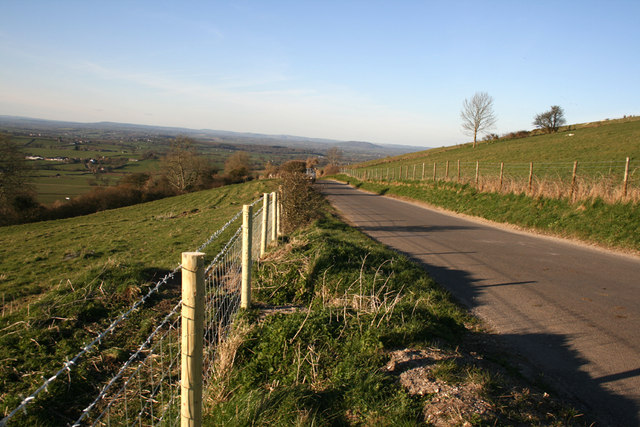
- View from Bell Hill looking down Bell Hill Rd towards the Blackmore Vale

Highest point
- Elevation: 258 m (846 ft)
- Prominence: 50 m (160 ft)
- Parent peak: Lewesdon Hill
- Listing: Hills of Dorset
- Coordinates: 50°52′25″N 2°17′10″W

Geography
- Location within England
- Location: Dorset, England
- Parent range: Dorset Downs
- OS grid: ST800082
- Topo map: OS Landranger 194

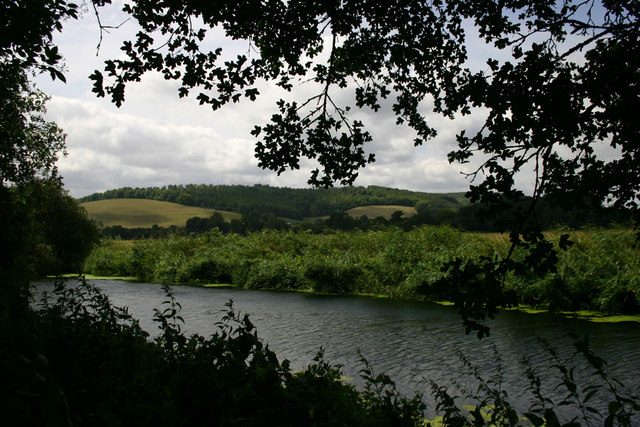
The River Stour with Shillingstone Hill, an eastern spur of Bell Hill, in the background

At 258 metres, Bell Hill is one of the highest hills in the county of Dorset, England and a high point on the Wessex Ridgeway.

== Location ==
Bell Hill lies about 5 miles west of Blandford Forum. The village of Ibberton nestles against its southwestern foot, whilst a little further to the northeast, below Okeford Hill on the same ridgeline, is the village of Okeford Fitzpaine.

The summit itself lies on a ridge running from northeast to southwest. To the northwest its escarpment drops steeply in to the Blackmore Vale and Stour Valley, whilst to the southeast the woods of Turnworth Clump and Ringmoor are bracketed by two more ridges, Ibberton Long Down and Turnworth Down, forming a horseshoe with Bell Hill. Another spur runs east from Turnworth Down to Shillingstone Hill, site of a quarry and a popular cross-country race. A trig point on the Wessex Ridgeway marks this subsidiary summit.

== History ==
There is evidence of prehistoric settlement, with a tumulus (a bowl barrow) 500 metres southwest of the summit, a cross dyke beyond it and a settlement and field system in the area of the Ringmoor plantation. Ringmoor is a National Trust property. A disused pit at the foot of the escarpment indicates earlier quarrying activity.

The villages of Belchalwell in the vale a mile to the northwest, and Belchalwell Street at the foot of the scarp, took their names from the original names of the two settlements, Bell and Chaldwell. Bell, now Belchalwell, was named after Bell Hill, and Chaldwell became Belchalwell Street.

== Sport ==
Bell Hill is a designated paragliding site.
