= Telegraph Hill, Dorset =

Hill in Dorset, England

Coordinates: 50°50′37″N 2°30′23″W

Telegraph Hill
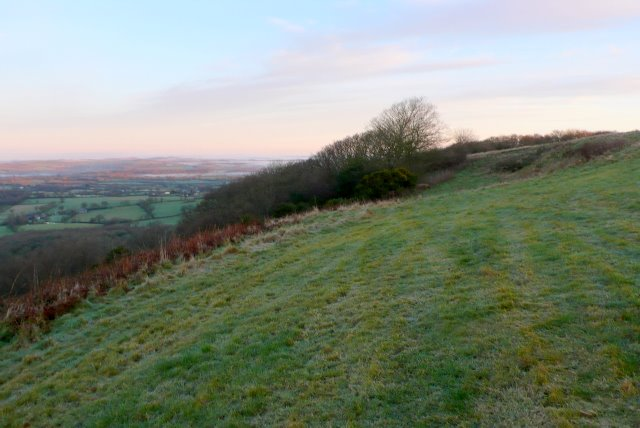
- View east along the northern slope of Telegraph Hill overlooking the Blackmore Vale

Highest point
- Elevation: 267 m (876 ft)
- Prominence: 121 m (397 ft)
- Parent peak: Lewesdon Hill
- Listing: HuMP

Geography
- Location: Dorset, England
- Parent range: Dorset Downs
- OS grid: ST644050
- Topo map(s): OS Landranger 194; Explorer 117W

Telegraph Hill (267 metres, 876 feet high) is a hill about 1 mile northwest of Minterne Magna and about 10 miles north of Dorchester in the county of Dorset, England. Its prominence qualifies it as one of the so-called HuMPs.

There is a transmission mast about 600 metres away on the spur to the northeast at High Stoy. Writing in 1906, Sir Frederick Treves described High Stoy as "the most engaging of all Dorset hills—a hill of 800 feet, made up of green slopes, a cliff, and a mantle of trees." Opposite High Stoy is Dogbury Hill, another bastion of the chalk escarpment.

A Franciscan friary lies in the hamlet of Hilfield beneath the hill to the west.

== Films ==
The area of Minterne, Dogbury Hill and High Stoy was the setting for Thomas Hardy's novel, The Woodlanders, Minterne House being referred to as Great Hintock House. The 1990s TV film of Hardy's Tess of the d'Urbervilles was made on Dogbury Hill.

== Sport ==
Telegraph Hill is a popular paragliding spot.

== Gallery ==
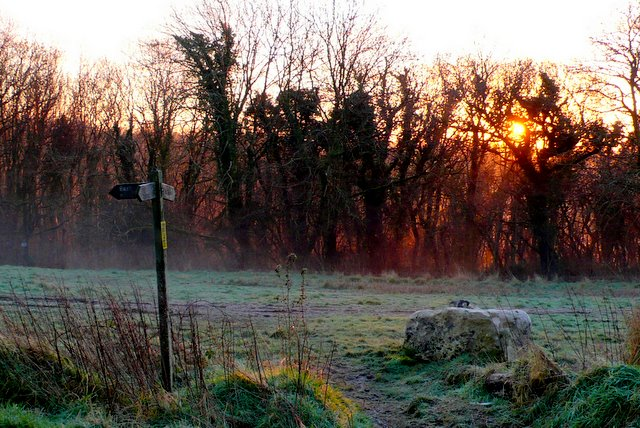
Early morning sun rising through woods on south side of Telegraph Hill

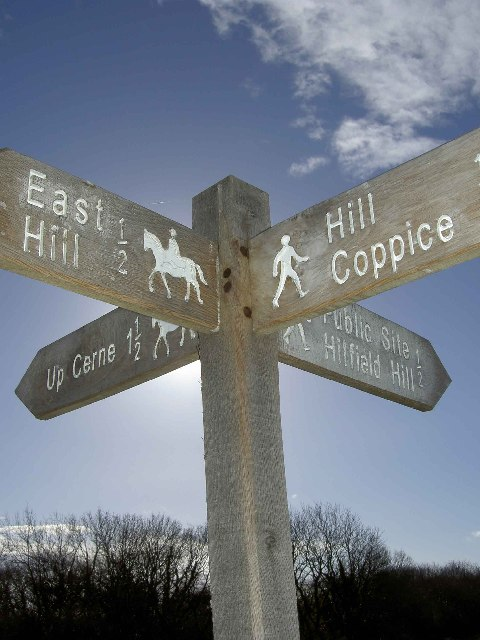
Bridlepath sign near Telegraph Hill
