= Dorset Downs =

Area of chalk downland in Dorset, England

Coordinates: 50.8600°N 2.3777°W

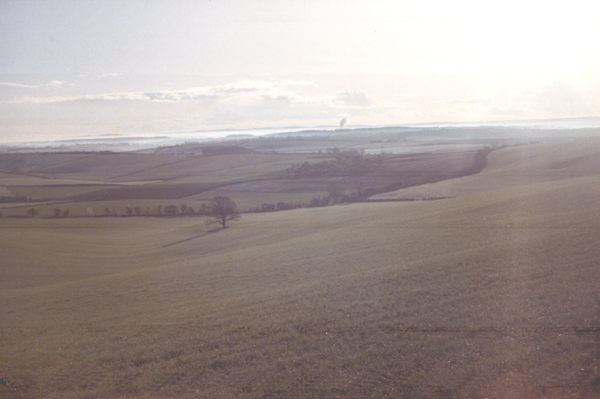
The top of the downs from above Cerne Abbas, looking south east towards the River Piddle valley

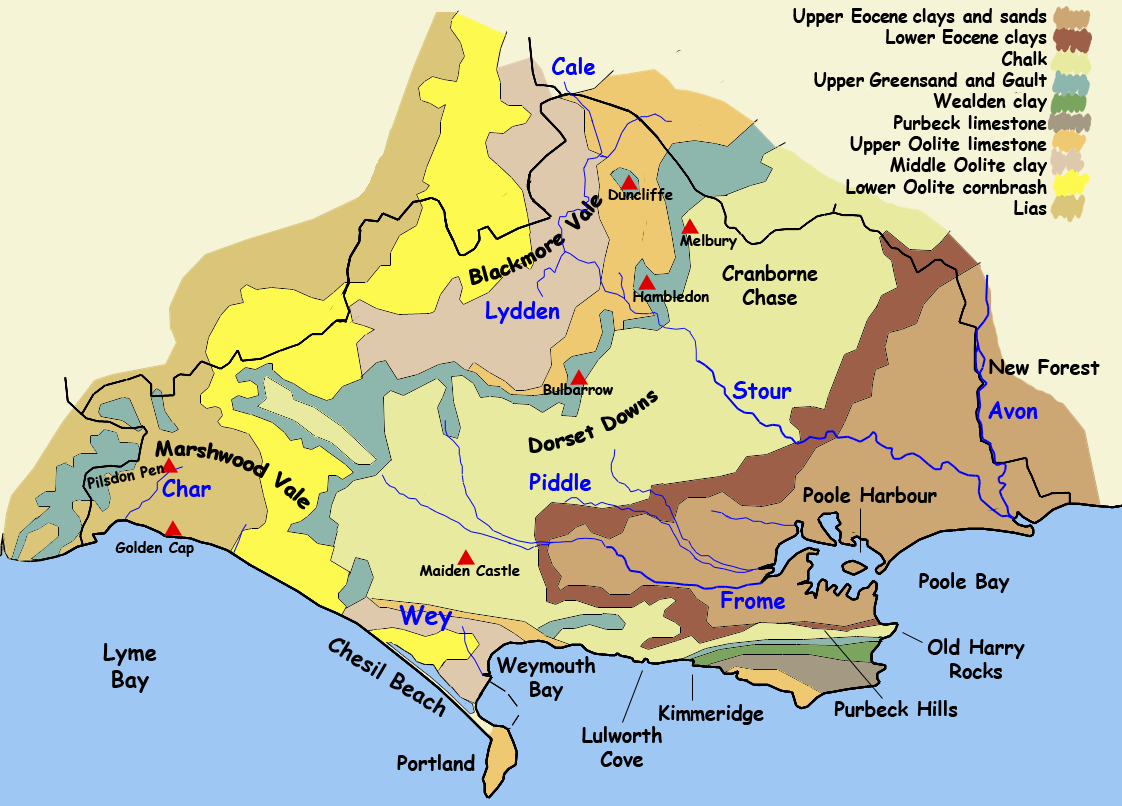
Map of Dorset, including the Dorset Downs, showing the geology

The Dorset Downs are an area of chalk downland in the centre of the county Dorset in south west England. The downs are the most western part of a larger chalk formation which also includes (from west to east) Cranborne Chase, Salisbury Plain, Hampshire Downs, Chiltern Hills, North Downs and South Downs.

== Physical geography ==
The Dorset Downs are bounded on the north, along the steep scarp face, by the Blackmore Vale, a large clay and limestone valley. On the east, the Downs were once, thousands of years ago, continuous with Cranborne Chase, but the River Stour now cuts a valley between them, which is the location of Blandford Forum and the eastern boundary of the downs. From the northern scarp face, the hills dip gently southwards before the chalk disappears beneath the Bagshot Beds which form the heathlands of the county, between Dorchester and Wareham. South of the River Frome, the chalk reappears in a narrower strip, forming coastal cliffs east of Weymouth and, further east, the steep ridge of the Purbeck Hills. This southerly strip of the visible chalk (sometimes referred to as the South Dorset Downs or South Dorset Ridgeway) continues westwards behind Weymouth, and rejoins the main body of the downs at their western extremity at Eggardon Hill. In the west the chalk dips down under marl.

Together with Cranborne Chase, the Dorset Downs have been designated as National Character Area 134 by Natural England, the UK Government's advisor on the natural environment. In Dorset this area is bounded by the Dorset Heaths and Weymouth Lowlands to the south, the Marshwood and Powerstock Vales to the west and the Blackmore Vale to the north.

The main land uses on the downs are arable agriculture, woodland and calcareous grassland, a habitat which is growing as farmers are encouraged to set aside land with subsidies. Chalk is a rough rock and the Dorset Downs hold a large water table which acts as a reservoir of drinking water for much of the county. This property of chalk also means there are many seasonal rivers, called winterbournes, that flow depending upon the level of the water table.

== Hills ==
- Bulbarrow Hill (274 m), site of Rawlsbury camp and the highest hill in the Downs.
- Telegraph Hill (267 m)
- Lyscombe Hill (262 m)
- Watts Hill (261 m)
- Bell Hill (258 m)
- Eggardon Hill (252 m), also the western extremity of the South Dorset Downs
- Toller Down (252 m)
- Ball Hill (251 m)
- Dogbury Hill (248 m)
- Beaminster Down (244 m)
- Shillingstone Hill (223 m), a densely wooded scarp face with a large quarry.
- Rampisham Down (219 m)
- Hambledon Hill (192 m) and Hod Hill (143 m), two outliers of Cranborne Chase, separated from the Downs by the River Stour.

== Fauna ==
The downs are the native home to the Dorset Down sheep.

== Places of interest ==
- Blandford Forest
- Cerne valley, including Cerne Abbas Giant.
- Dorsetshire Gap, a steep valley.
- Milton Abbas, 18th-century planned estate village and museum.
- Minterne Magna, Rhododendron garden at Minterne House.
- Nettlecombe Tout hill fort.
- Ringmoor settlement and field system.

== See also ==
- Bowerchalke - geological profile of a Lower Greensand inlier on the chalklands of Cranborne Chase
