= Joseph Clark =

Joseph or Joe Clark may refer to:

== Arts ==
- Joseph Clark (painter) (1834–1926), English painter in oils known for domestic scenes
- Joseph Clayton Clark (1857–1937), English artist who worked as "Kyd", illustrator of the novels of Charles Dickens
- Joseph Benwell Clark (1857–1938), English painter, engraver and book illustrator
- Joseph Bernard Clark (1868–1940), British ornamental plasterer

== Government and politics ==
- Joseph Clark (New York politician) (1787–1873), New York politician
- Joseph Clement Clark (1858–1929), Maryland politician and physician
- Joseph Alfred Clark (1872–1951), New South Wales politician
- Joe Clark (Australian politician) (1897–1992)
- Joseph S. Clark Jr. (1901–1990), United States Senator from Pennsylvania and mayor of Philadelphia
- Joseph W. Clark (1912–1974), Iowa politician
- Joe Clark (born 1939), 16th Prime Minister of Canada

== Sports ==
- Joseph Sill Clark Sr. (1861–1956), American tennis player
- Joe Clark (footballer, born 1874), Scottish footballer with Dundee, Brighton United, Newton Heath, Dunfermline Athletic and East Fife
- Joe Clark, Canadian competitor in lacrosse at the 1904 Summer Olympics
- Joe Clark (footballer, born 1890) (1890–1960), English footballer with Cardiff City, Southampton and Rochdale
- Joe Clark (footballer, born 1920) (1920–2008), English footballer with Leyton Orient
- Joe Ira Clark (born 1975), American basketball player

== Other people ==
- Joseph Clark (contortionist) (died c. 1696), English contortionist
- Joseph Samuel Clark (1871–1944), African-American academic administrator
- Joseph J. Clark (1893–1971), admiral in the U.S. Navy during World War II
- Joe Louis Clark (1938–2020), former New Jersey high school principal, portrayed in the 1989 film Lean on Me
- Joe Clark (aeronautics) (1941–2020), American aerospace pioneer
- Joseph Lewis Clark (1949–2006), American convicted murderer executed in Ohio in May 2006

== Fictional characters ==
- Joe Clark (character), a character on The Young and the Restless
- Joe Clark, a The Shield character

== See also ==
- Joseph Clarke (disambiguation)
- "Old Joe Clark", a folk song
