= Joseph Clarke =

Joseph or Joe Clarke may refer to:

== Sports ==
- Joe Clarke (canoeist) (born 1992), British slalom canoeist
- Joe Clarke (cricketer) (born 1996), English cricketer
- Joe Clarke (Galway hurler) (born 1952), Irish retired hurler
- Joe Clarke (soccer) (born 1953), former U.S. soccer defender and collegiate soccer coach
- Joe Clarke (Westmeath hurler) (born 1986), Irish hurler

== Politics and government ==
- Joseph Clarke (Canadian politician) (1869–1941), Canadian politician and lawyer
- Joseph Clarke (Kentucky politician) (1933–2003), American politician
- Joe Clarke (Irish republican) (1882–1976), Irish republican activist
- Joseph Calvitt Clarke Jr. (1920–2004), United States federal judge

== Other ==
- Joseph Clarke (physician) (1758–1834), Irish physician
- Joseph Clarke (priest) (died 1749), English controversialist
- Joseph Clarke (architect) (died 1888), British Gothic Revival architect
- Joseph Augustine Clarke (1844–1890), Queensland artist, painter, journal illustrator and arts-teacher
- Joseph I. C. Clarke (1846–1927), Irish-American journalist, playwright, and poet

== See also ==
- Joseph Clark (disambiguation)
