= J. B. Clark =

J. B. Clark may refer to

- John Bates Clark (1847–1938), American economist
- Joseph Benwell Clark (1857–1938), English painter and engraver
