= Cerne Abbas =

Village in Dorset, England

Coordinates: 50.8095°N 2.4810°W

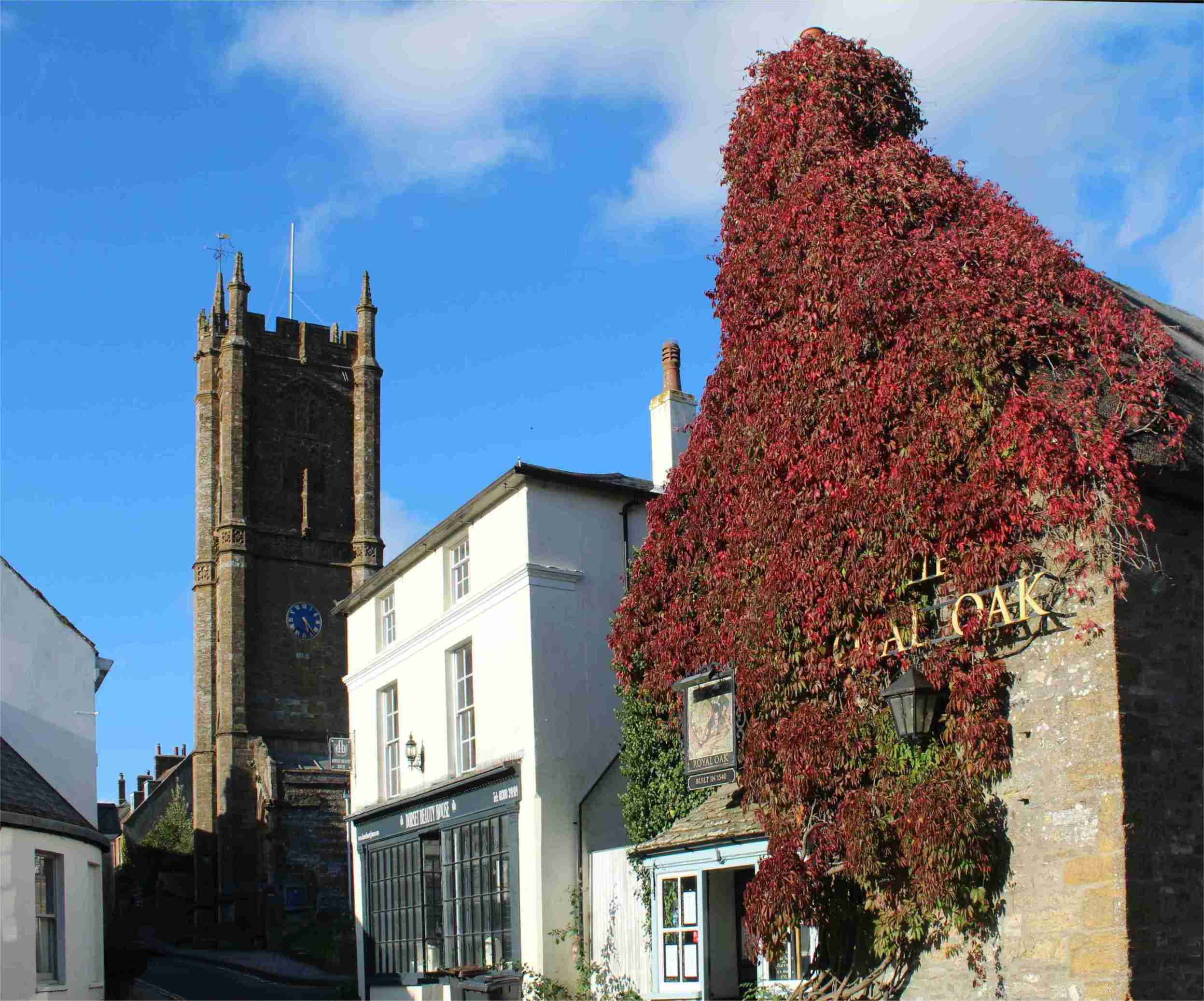
- The village centre

- Location within Dorset
- Population: 858 (2021 census)
- OS grid reference: ST662012
  - London: 112.5 miles
- Unitary authority: Dorset
- Ceremonial county: Dorset
- Region: South West
- Country: England
- Sovereign state: United Kingdom
- Post town: Dorchester
- Postcode district: DT2
- Dialling code: 01300
- Police: Dorset
- Fire: Dorset and Wiltshire
- Ambulance: South Western
- UK Parliament: West Dorset

Cerne Abbas (/ˌsɜːrn ˈæbəs/) is a village and civil parish in Dorset in southern England. It lies in the Dorset Council administrative area in the Cerne Valley in the Dorset Downs. The village lies just east of the A352 road 10 km (6 mi) north of Dorchester. At the 2021 census, the parish had a population of 858.

In 2008 it was voted Britain's "Most Desirable Village" by estate agent Savills. It is the location of the Cerne Abbas Giant, a chalk figure of a giant naked man on a hillside.

== Etymology ==
River Cerne means "the stony stream", with the name Cerne being derived from the Primitive Welsh carn, "cairn, pile of stones". It is suggested that the pronunciation with soft 'c' instead of the more logical "chern" (Old English ċēarn) is due to Anglo-Norman influence.

Abbas is the graecised form of the Aramaic aba ("my father"), as used in the Septuagint and in the New Testament, which resulted in the English word abbot.

== History ==
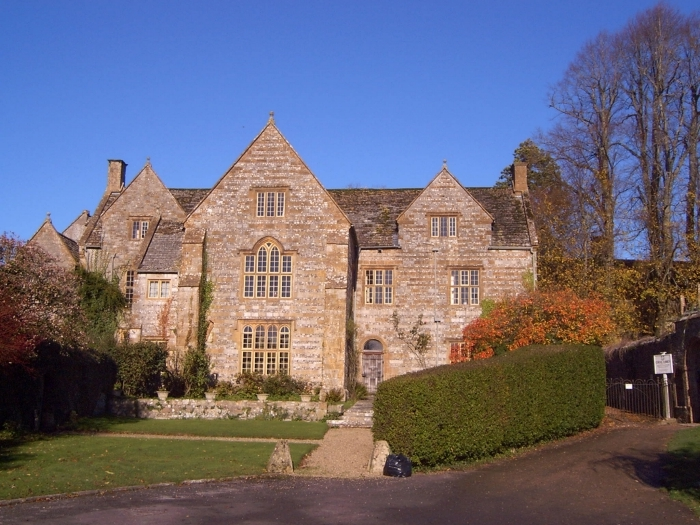
Abbey Farm House

The village of Cerne Abbas grew up around the Benedictine abbey, Cerne Abbey, which was founded there in AD 987 (Abbas is medieval Latin for "abbot", but with a long 2nd syllable). The Domesday Book of 1086 recorded cultivated land for 20 ploughs, with 26 villeins and 32 bordars. The abbey dominated the area for more than 500 years. It was surrendered to Henry VIII in 1539 with the Dissolution of the Monasteries and was largely destroyed; a portion of the Abbot's Porch and Abbey guesthouse remain. St Augustine's Well, reputedly blessed by the saint, also remains. St Mary's Church, built by the abbey for the parish in the late 13th century, is in the heart of the parish and retains many original features.

In the centuries after the Dissolution, the village thrived as a small market town. Its wealth was partly generated by brewing, its underground water making it famous for the quality of its beer, which was sold as far away as London and was even exported to the Americas. At one time, Cerne Abbas had 14 public houses, serving visitors and a population of about 1,500. The availability of water power also gave rise to milling, tanning, silk weaving, glove and hat making and many other small industries.

The coming of the railways in the 19th century bypassed Cerne and the village went into decline. By 1906, the population had halved and many of the houses had fallen into disrepair. In 1919, the village was sold by the Pitt-Rivers estate, which had owned it. The village now has a local school, a post office, three remaining historic public houses, tearooms and a number of other shops.

In Buildings of England, Nikolaus Pevsner claims that the Abbey Farm House, which was rebuilt after a fire in the mid-1700s, was formerly the main gateway to the abbey. When rebuilt, the central window of the former gateway projection was given an unusual "Gothic Venetian" window.

In 2023, archaeologists began digging to find the long lost ruins of Cerne Abbey.

== Tourist attractions ==
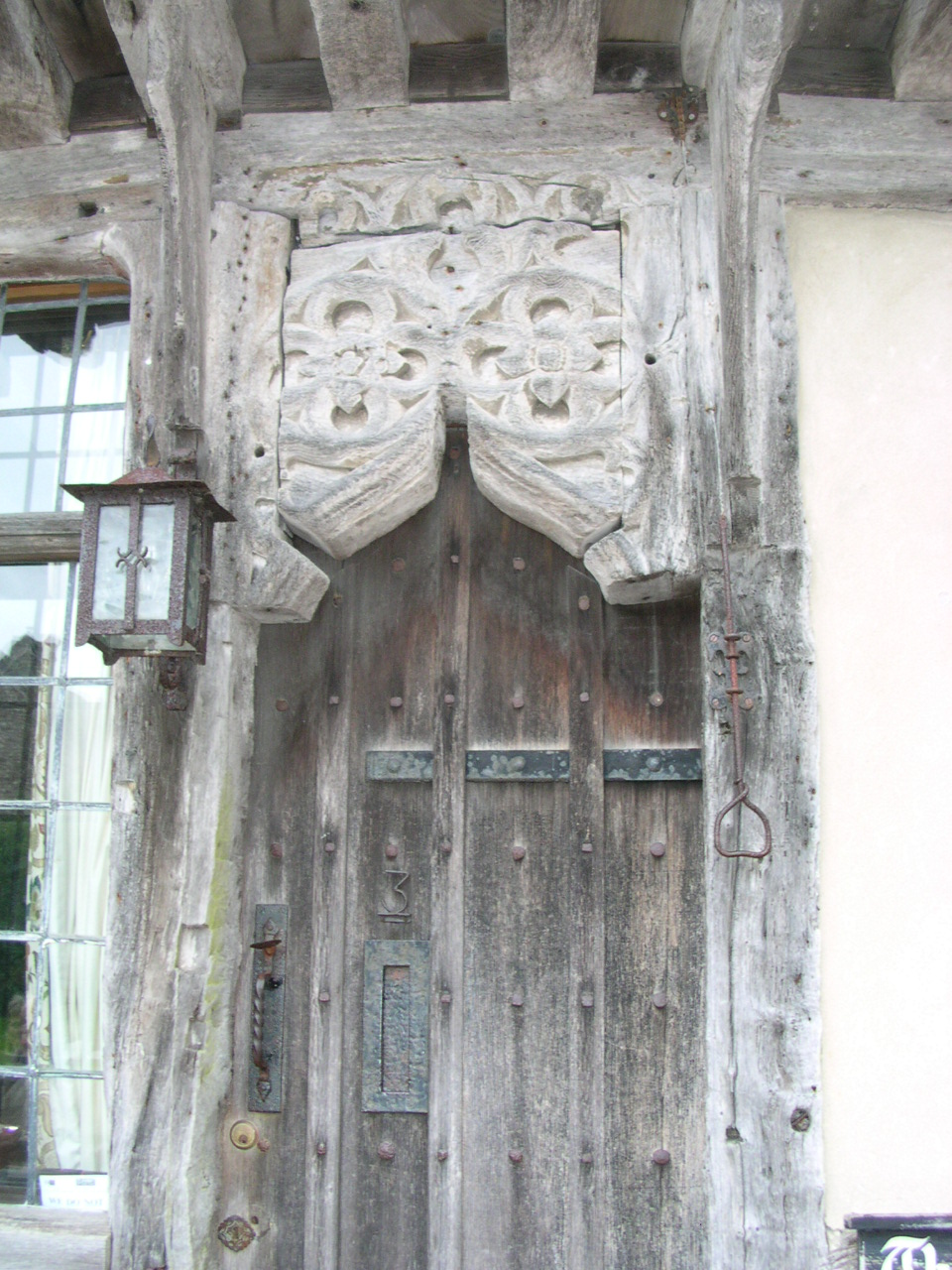
The pitchmarket doorway

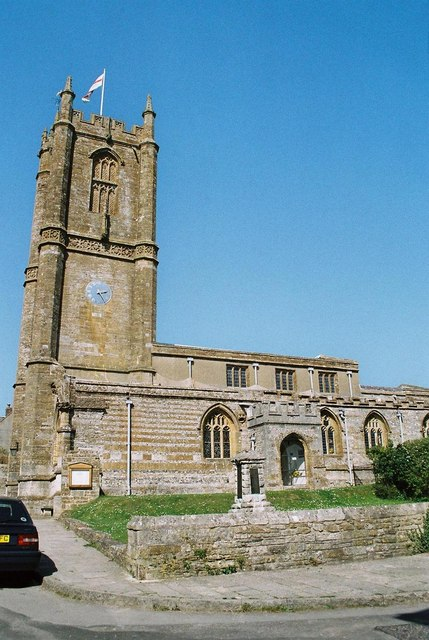
Parish church of St Mary

Cerne Abbas attracts many tourists, who are drawn by the River Cerne, streets lined with historic stone houses, the abbey, the giant, and various events including a classical music festival. The church of St Mary is of 13th-century origin but was largely rebuilt in the 15th and early 16th centuries and partly reconstructed in the 17th century. Features of interest include the 17th-century pulpit and the great east window which probably came from the abbey.

=== Cerne Abbas Giant ===
The best known attraction is the Cerne Abbas Giant, a 55-metre (180 ft) naked figure carved into the chalk hillside. The giant, owned by the National Trust, is thought to be an Iron Age fertility symbol but, as it is unlikely that the monks of Cerne Abbey would have tolerated such a figure, and with no records before the 17th century, this cannot be confirmed. Many scholars think that it was created in the mid-17th century, although there is evidence of Iron Age settlement on the downs nearby.

=== Events ===
Each June, the Cerne Abbas Open Gardens can attract over a thousand visitors. Other events include horticultural shows, the annual village fete, the Cerne Abbas Music Festival, and the Wessex Morris Men often perform in the village on bank holidays. The four-day music festival began in 1990 and hosts classical artists of world renown.

== Demography ==
Census population of Cerne Abbas
Census	Population	Households
2001 (Note: In 2001, Cerne Abbas parish census data was reported combined with that for Up Cerne parish.)	742	359
2011	784	377
2021	858	397

== Notable people ==
- Joseph Clark (1834–1926), painter, was born in Cerne Abbas
- Joseph Benwell Clark (1857–1938), artist, was born in Cerne Abbas and retired here
- Kate Adie (born 1945), journalist, lives at Cerne Abbas

== Literature ==
- Cerne Abbas features in Thomas Hardy's Wessex as "Abbots Cernel".
- School of the Night, a mystery by Judith Cook set in Elizabethan England, contains scenes set in Cerne Abbas, and mentions the Cerne Abbas Giant.
- Unconquered, a historical novel by Neil Swanson set in pre-revolutionary England and America, describes Abigail Hale's upbringing in Cerne Abbas.
- In John Le Carré's A Murder of Quality, the murder occurs in "Carne Abbas" in "Dorsett".
- Australian authors Kate Forsythe and Kim Wilkins collaborated in 2017 on a book of short stories, The Silver Well, all set in Cerne Abbas. Each story is set in a different time in the village's history, with the book spanning AD 44 and 2017.
