= Dorset dialect =

Traditional dialect spoken in Dorset, England

- Dorset English
- Native to: England
- Region: Dorset
- Language family: Indo-European: Germanic; West Germanic; Ingvaeonic; Anglo-Frisian; Anglic; English; British English; West Country English; Dorset dialect
- Early forms: Old English: Middle English; Early Modern English

Language codes
- ISO 639-3: –
- Glottolog: None

The Dorset dialect is the traditional dialect spoken in Dorset, a county in the West Country of England. Stemming from Old West Saxon, it is preserved in the isolated Blackmore Vale, despite it somewhat falling into disuse throughout the earlier part of the 20th century, when the arrival of the railways brought the customs and language of other parts of the country and in particular, London. The rural dialect is still spoken in some villages however and is kept alive in the poems of William Barnes and Robert Young.

== Origins and distribution ==
Dorset (or archaically, Dorsetshire) is a county in South West England on the English Channel coast. It borders Devon to the west, Somerset to the north-west, Wiltshire to the north-east, and Hampshire to the east. The Dorset dialect is derivative of the Wessex dialect which is spoken, with regional variations, in Dorset, Wiltshire, Somerset and Devon. It was mainly spoken in the Blackmore Vale in North Dorset, not so prevalent in the south of the county and less so in the south-east, which was historically in Hampshire prior to local government re-organisation in 1974.

The Dorset dialect stems from Saxon with heavy Norse influence. The Saxon invaders that landed in Dorset and Hampshire towards the end of the 6th century, hailed from what is now the south of Denmark and the Saxon islands of Heligoland, Busen and Nordstrand. The dialect of the Saxons who settled in what became Wessex was very different from that of Saxons who settled in the east and south-east of England, being heavily influenced by their Jutish neighbours. The Anglo-Saxon Chronicle records that Jutes occupied the area before the Saxons arrived and there are a number of Kentish words entrenched in the Dorset language, 'dwell' for example.

== Phonology ==
Dorset is a medium-sized county in the South West of England which has a distinct accent and dialect. Some of the distinct features of the accent include: H-dropping, glottalization, rhoticity and accentuated vowel sounds.

=== Consonants ===
Consonant phonemes
	Labial		Dental		Alveolar		Post- alveolar		Palatal	Velar		Glottal
Nasal		m				n					ŋ	
Stop	p	b			t	d				k	ɡ	
Affricate							tʃ	dʒ				
Fricative	f	v	θ	ð	s	z	ʃ	ʒ				h
Approximant						l		r	j		w	

A prominent feature in the accent is the use of a t-glottalization, commonly used when it is in the last syllable of a multi-syllable word.

The /ð/ sound is pronounced [d] when it precedes an /r/ and sometimes on other occasions. The voiceless [θ] in words such as think is replaced with the voiced [ð] sound as in the. The voiced [ð] also replaces the 'double d', so ladder becomes la(th)er. The letters ⟨s⟩ and ⟨f⟩, if the first or last letter of a word, are pronounced as [z] and [v] respectively. However, words that are not of Germanic origin or have been adopted from other languages retain their original sound; family, figure, factory, scene, sabbath for example, are not pronounced vamily, vigure, vactory, zene and zabbath. The /v/ becomes a [b] if it appears before an /ən/ sound so eleven sounds like 'elebn'. The 'z' and the 'v' in Dorset are used to distinguish words which, in standard English, sound the same: sea and see, son and sun, foul and fowl become sea and zee, son and zun, and foul and vowl for example.

The liquid consonants /l/ and /r/ are treated differently in the Dorset dialect. When 'r' and 'l' come together, a 'd' or 'e' sound is put between them, so curl and twirl become curel and twirel or as often, curdl and twirdl.

Although the accent has some rhoticity, meaning the letter ⟨r⟩ in words is pronounced, so for example, "hard" is pronounced /hɑːrd/ and not /hɑːd/; the 'r' is omitted when it comes before some open and closed palate letters. Therefore words like burst, first, force and verse, are pronounced bu'st, vu'st, fwo'ss and ve'ss. Other consonants are left out when they immediately precede a hard consonant in the following word: bit of cheese becomes bit o' cheese but bit of an apple often remains bit ov an apple. This is not always the case though. Sometimes the labiodental fricative is also elided along with following sounds. For example, "all of it" is often spoken as "all o't" and "all of 'em" becomes "all o'm". Similarly "let us" becomes "le's" and "better than that" becomes "better 'n 'at".

The /s/ sound is also often transposed. Words such as clasp and crisp, becoming claps and crips in the dialect. Other examples of this type of the pronunciation include ax for ask, and the use of the word wopsy for a wasp. When /j/ starts a word, it is sometimes given an /i/ sound. Examples of this include, eet for yet, and eesterday for yesterday.

The letter ⟨h⟩ is often dropped from words, so "hello" becomes "ello" but is also added where none would be in standard English. This usually occurs when the Friesic equivalent root word begins with an aspirated [k]. So the words "kwing", meaning quick, and "kring", meaning bend, from which the English words "wing" and "ring" are derived, are voiced as "hwing" and "hring" respectively [ʍ].

=== Vowels ===
The /i/ sound in some words, such as bean, clean, lean and mead, is voiced as a [iə], but this is not always the case; bead, meat, read keep the monophthong but use the short [ɛ] sound. The words head and lead, pronounced /hɛd/ and /lɛd/ in standard English, also use this [ɛ] sound. Words in the FACE lexical set are generally spoken with the [jɛ] diphthong, such as in bake, cake, late and lane. The standard English /ɛ/ in words such as beg, leg, peg, are given the short [a]. So egg thus becomes agg which gives rise to the Dorset dialect word for egg collecting, aggy. In a few words where ⟨a⟩ precedes ⟨r⟩, as in arm, charm and garden, the vowel sound is pronounced as [iə] or [jaː]. The short /ʌ/ sound in words such as dust, crust and rut is usually pronounced in the Dorset dialect as an [ə:u] diphthong to make dowst, crowst and rowt.

Vowels sounds are sometimes preceded by a [w] sound, particularly the [ɔɪ̯] sound in words such as boil, spoil and point, and the English long [oʊ̯]. Barnes' book, Poems of Rural Life in the Dorset Dialect, contains the poem Woak were Good Enough Woonce which begins:

Ees; now mahogany’s the goo,
An’ good wold English woak won’t do.
I wish vo’k always mid auvord
Hot meals upon a woakèn bwoard,
As good as think that took my cup
An’ trencher all my growèn up.

== Grammar ==
=== Adjectives ===
Adjectives in the dialect often end 'en', more so than in standard English which still retains wooden to describe something made of wood but would not use 'leatheren' to describe something made of leather. A paper bag in Dorset would be a bag to put paper in, as opposed to a paperen bag, a bag made of paper. A woaken bwoard, in the Barnes' poem above, is a board made from oak. Some nouns when pluralised, also end in 'en' instead of the more usual 's' or 'es'. Cheese, house and place for example become cheesen, housen and pleacen. Other unconventional plurals in the dialect include words ending 'st' such as coast, post and fist. Normally pluralised with the addition of an 's', instead take 'es' to make coastes, postes and vistes.

=== Nouns ===
There are two different classes of noun in the Dorset dialect, and each has its own personal pronoun. Things that have no fixed shape or form, such as sand, water, dust etc, more or less follow the rules of standard English, in that they take the pronoun "it". However things with a given shape such as a tree or a brick use the personal pronoun, "he". Referring to a felled tree, someone from Dorset might say, "I chopped 'e down" but when talking about a diminishing stream, "It's a-drying up". The objective class of he, in this case is "en", thus "I chopped 'e down" but "'E felled en". Instead of the usual two, the Dorset dialect has four demonstrative pronouns. In addition to "this" and "that" which are used for the nouns without fixed form, there is also "thease" and "thic" respectively. Thus, "Teake thease fork and pitch that hay" and "'Old thik can while I pour this paint in". These demonstrative nouns can help remove ambiguity, for when a Dorset man says 'that stone' he is talking about a load of broken stone but if he says 'thik stone', he is talking about a particular stone. He will say, "Pick it up" when referring to the former but "Pick en up" when talking about the latter.

The use and formation of pronouns differ from standard English. When emphatic pronouns are used obliquely, for example, the nominative rather than the objective form is employed, thus "Give the gun to I" but unemphatically, "Give me the gun". 'Self' is inflected in common with other nouns, when used in conjunction with personal pronouns; in the same way one would say 'his book' or 'their book', the Dorset speech uses hisself and theirselves, not himself and themselves.

When dialect speakers discuss a quantity or a count, the units are given before tens; 'four and twenty' for example, not 'twenty-four'.

=== Verbs ===
Many verbs in the dialect are conjugated in an unorthodox fashion, noticeably 'to be', which goes: I be, thou bist, you be, we be, they be, and not; I am, you are, we are, they are. 'Is' is sometimes used however for he, she and it and in the past tense, 'were' is used for all the personal pronouns except the now largely archaic, but still used, 'thou', which uses 'werst'. 'Was' is not used. In the perfect tense, verbs are often preceded by an 'a'; I've a-been, I had a-been, I shall have a-been, for example. There is no distinction between the auxiliary verbs 'may' and 'might', instead 'mid' is used in both cases. When auxiliary verbs end in 'd' or 's', 'en' is added at the end to express the negative. 'Could not', 'should not', 'might not', 'must not', become 'coulden', 'shoulden', 'midden' and 'mussen'. Although the last two examples 'might' and 'must' end with 't', the Dorset equivalents are sounded with 'd' and 's' respectively.

Verbs in the past-tense have both an aorist and an imperfect tense form which indicates whether the action is ongoing or repeated. To say "The kids stole the apples from the tree", for example, means it occurred once, but to say "The kids did steal the apples from the tree" means it is recurrent event. Verbs in the infinitive mode or those used in conjunction with an auxiliary verb, often have 'y' attached to the end, but only when the verb is absolute. One might ask "Can ye sewy?" but never "Will you sewy a patch on?" Some verbs, which are irregular in mainstream English, are treated as regular in the Dorset dialect, and vice-versa. For example: Blew, built and caught are blowed, builded and catched, whereas scrape becomes scrope.

When forming the perfect participle, a letter 'a' at the beginning of the verb acts as an augment. Thus, "He have alost his watch" or "She have abroke the vase". Coupled with the accentuated pronunciation of the vowels this makes for a smooth, flowing dialect by diluting the hard consonants in the language.

== Punning ==
Pronunciation
English	Dorset	English	Dorset	English	Dorset	English	Dorset
Ale	Eal	Ail	Ail	Board	Bwoard	Bored	Bor'd
Foul	Foul	Fowl	Vowl	Hole	Hole	Whole	Hwol
Mare	Meare	Mayor	May-or	Pale	Peale	Pail	Pail
Sale	Zeale	Sail	Sail	Son	Son	Sun	Zun

Puns, humour which exploits the similar sounds of two different words, rarely work in the Dorset dialect. Many like sounding words in standard English are not pronounced the same in Dorset. For example, the classic pun, "The people told the sexton and the sexton toll'd the bell", would sound as, "The people twold the sex'on and the sex'on tolled the bell". Dialect words beginning with 's' are spoken with a 'z' if they are Germanic in origin, but words that entered the language later, are not. 'Sun' is 'zun' but 'son' keeps the 's' sound. 'Scene' is the same but 'seen' is 'zeen'. The letter 'f', if the first or last of a word is pronounced as a 'v' but again, only if the word is derived from the original Saxon. The verb 'fall' and 'fall' meaning autumn, are 'vall' and 'fall' respectively, and one would immediately know what is meant by, "This chicken is foul" because fowl is pronounced 'vowl'.

== Words and phrases ==
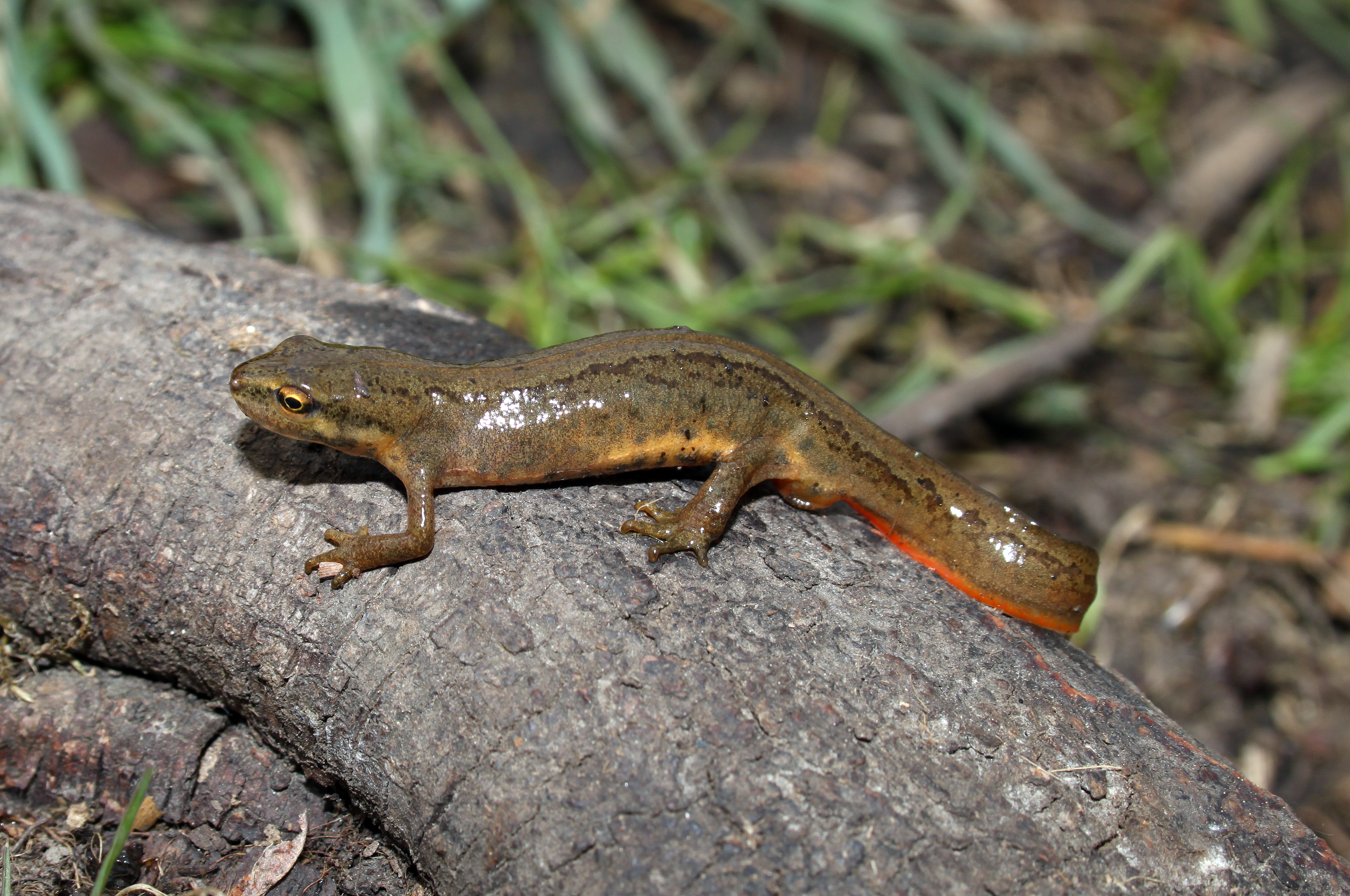
Asker

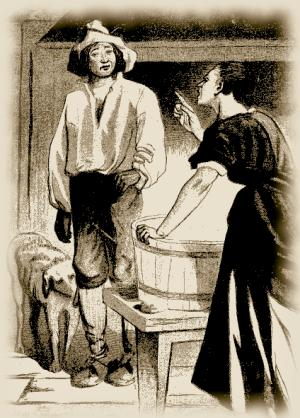
Bally-rag

Dorset is home to some distinctive words and phrases. Some phrases are alternative versions of common English idioms, such as, Don't teach yer grandma to spin equivalent to standard English, 'Don't teach your grandmother to suck eggs', and Zet the fox to keep the geese similar to 'Putting the fox in charge of the hen house', but others are peculiar to Dorset. All the goo, meaning 'all the fashion', was how Barnes described the then new fad for mahogany furniture, in his poem Woak Was Good Enough Woonce and That'll happen next Niver'stide, which refers to something that will never happen. To hold wi' the hare and run wi' the hounds is another typical Dorset saying and refers to hedging one's bets or trying to cover all the bases. Someone from Dorset might say, I do live too near a wood to be frightened by an owl, to indicate that they know enough about something, not to be worried by it.

There are many words to refer to 'a bite to eat', it is said that a Dorset man has eight meals a day; dewbit, breakfast, nuncheon, cruncheon, luncheon, nammet, crammet and supper. Many 'dialect' words are contractions: Bumbye and bimeby are short for 'by-and-by', didden for 'didn't' and gramfer and grammer are for 'grandfather' and 'grandmother' respectively.

The word 'like' is often used as a qualifier for an adjective and is attached to the end of the sentence. To say, "He's ill, like" means he is 'rather' ill.

=== Selected glossary of Dorset dialect words ===
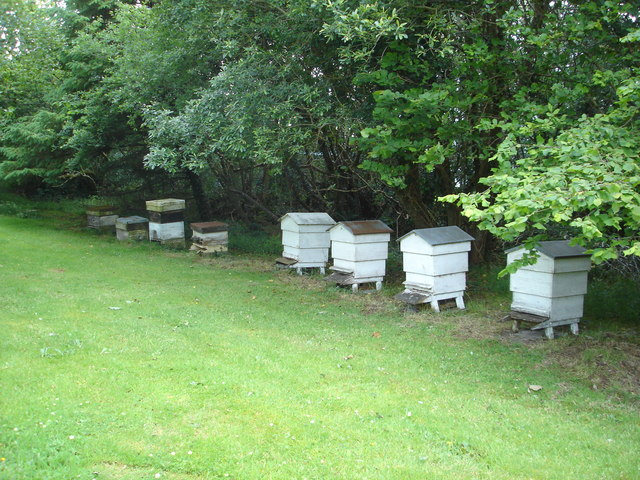
Bee-pots

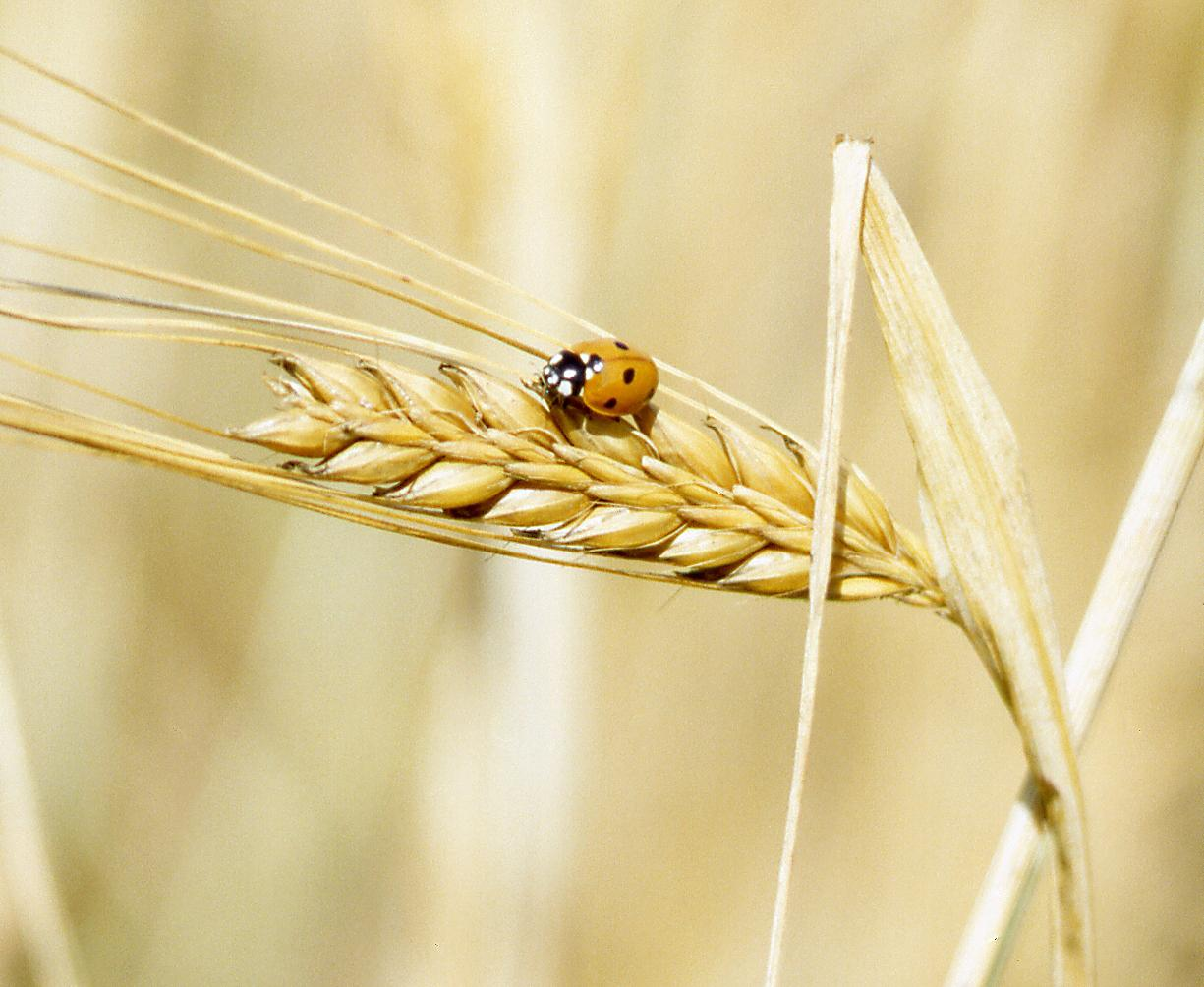
Biddle in a barken field

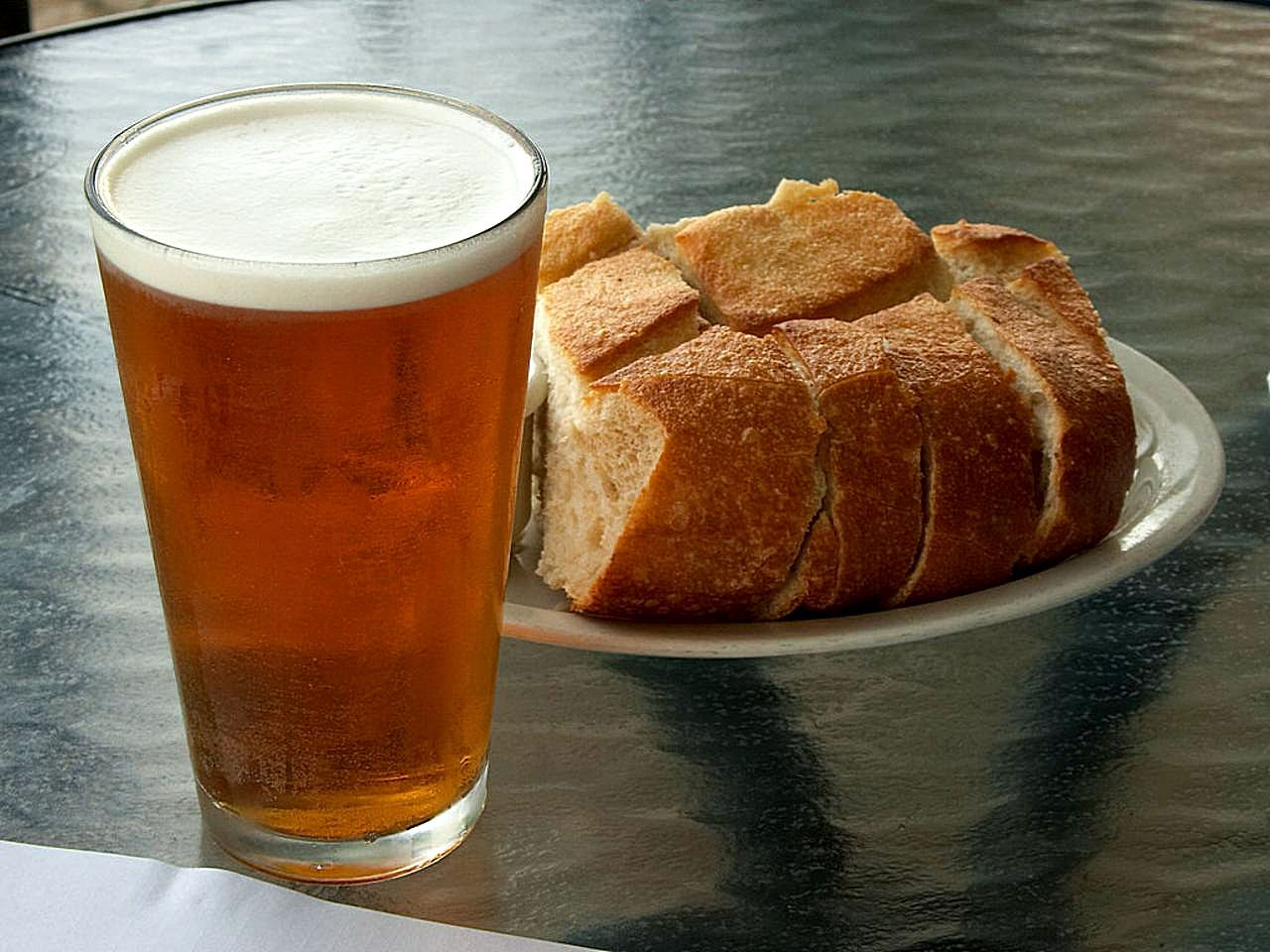
Bit 'n' drap

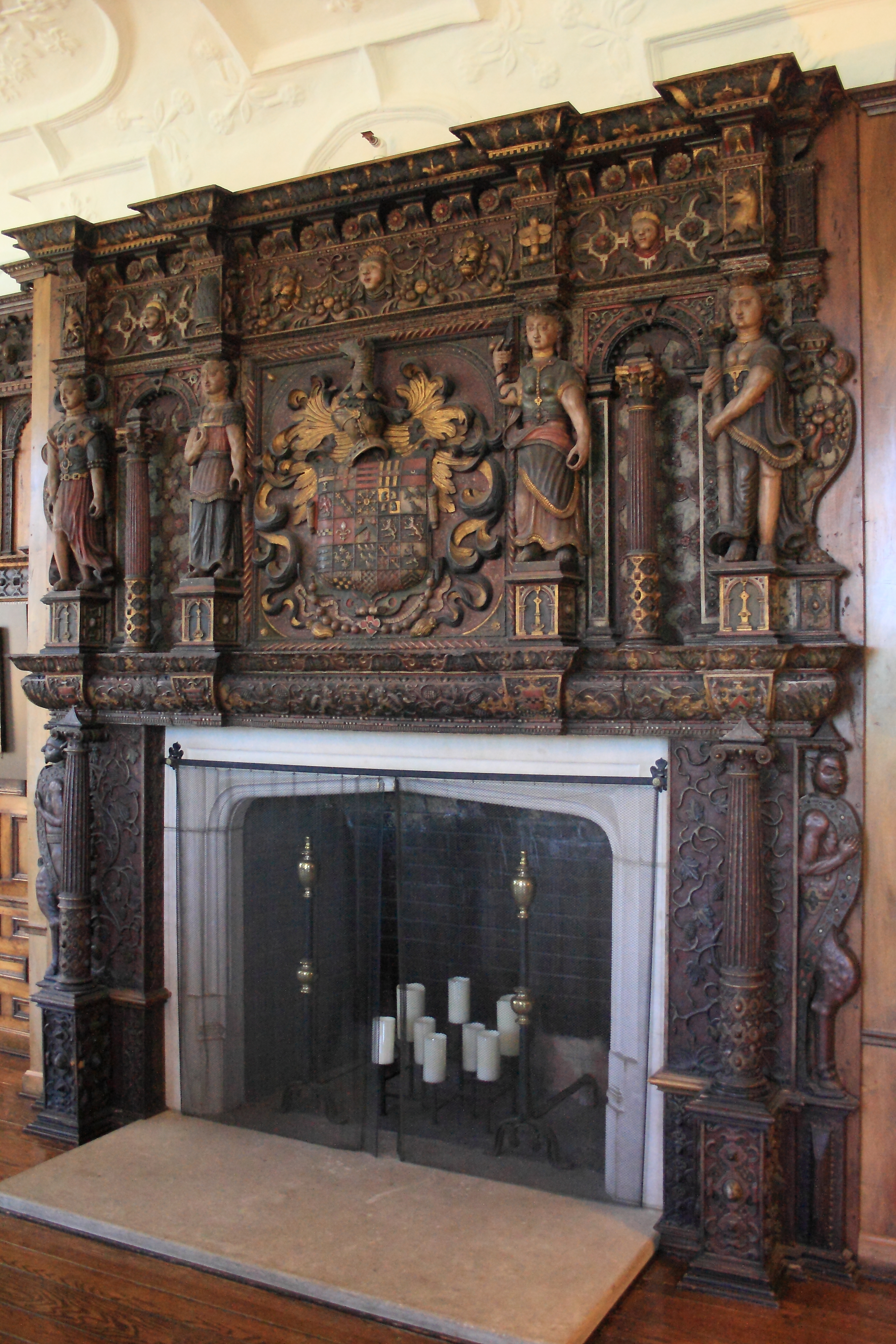
A girt clavy

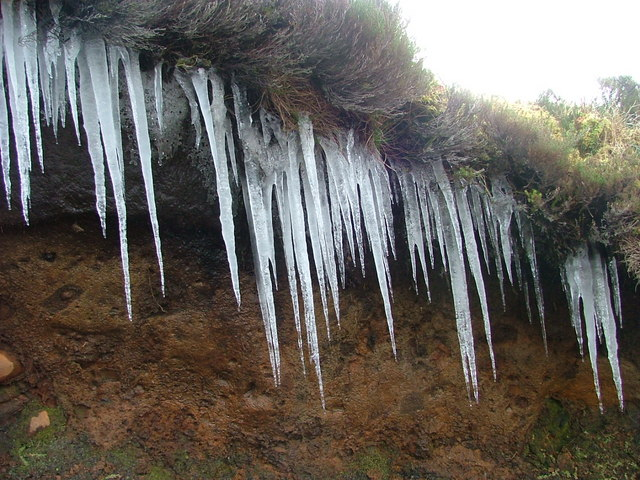
Clinkers or tinklebobs

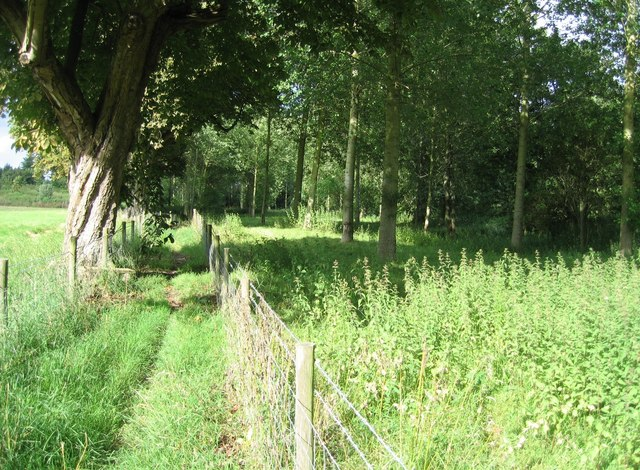
Drongway

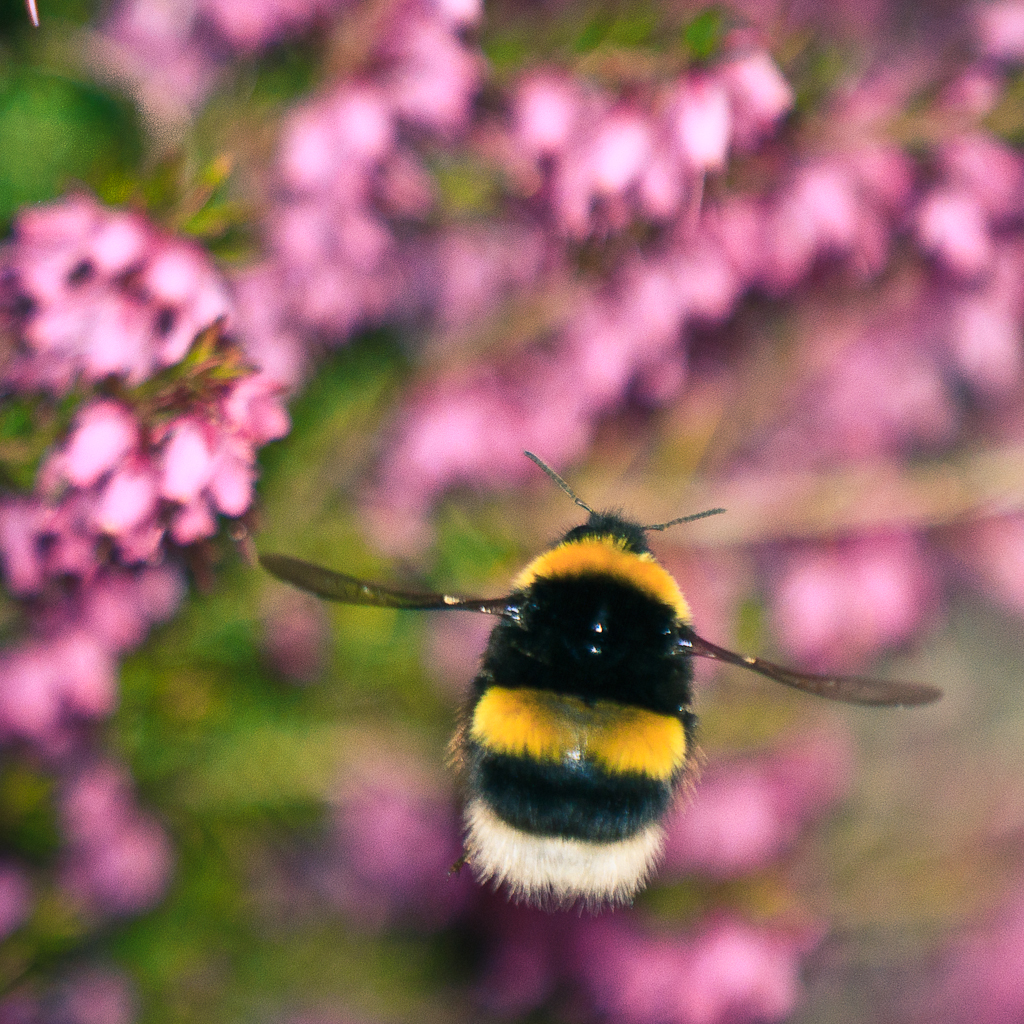
Dumbledore

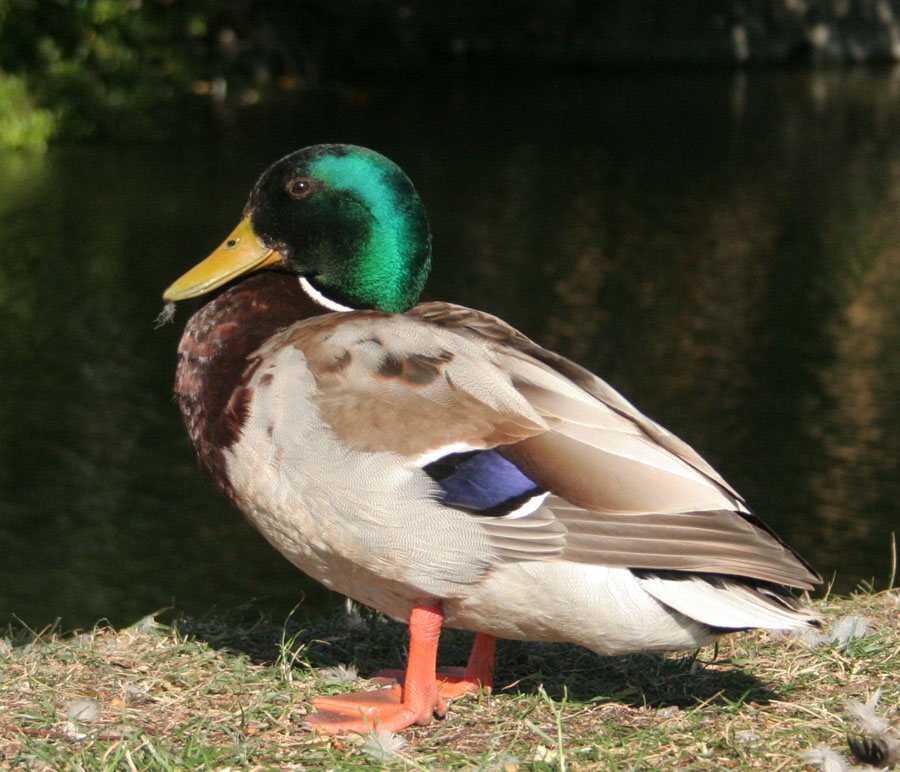
Homhle

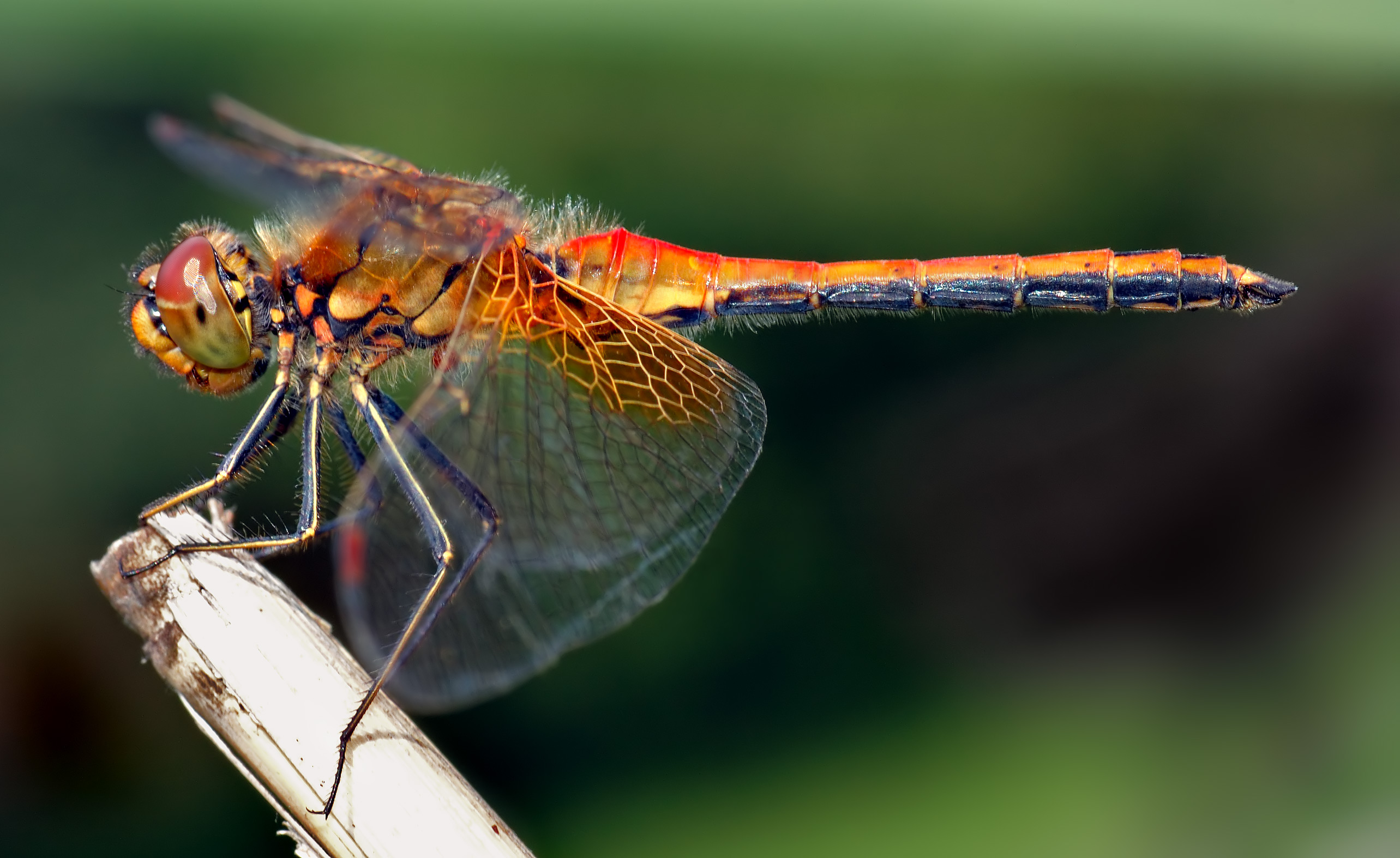
Hoss-stinger

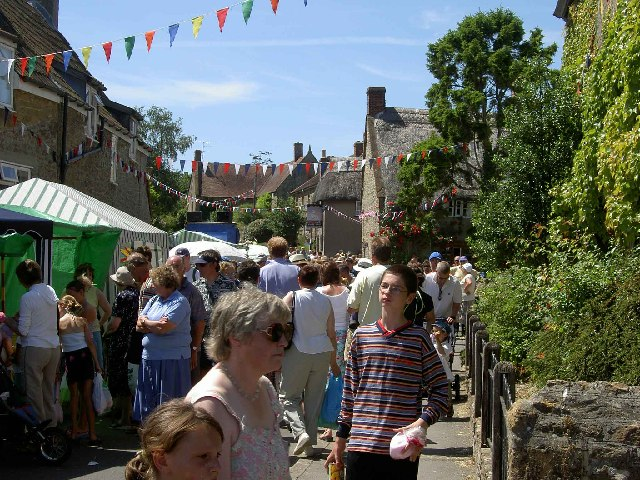
A mampus in Yetminster

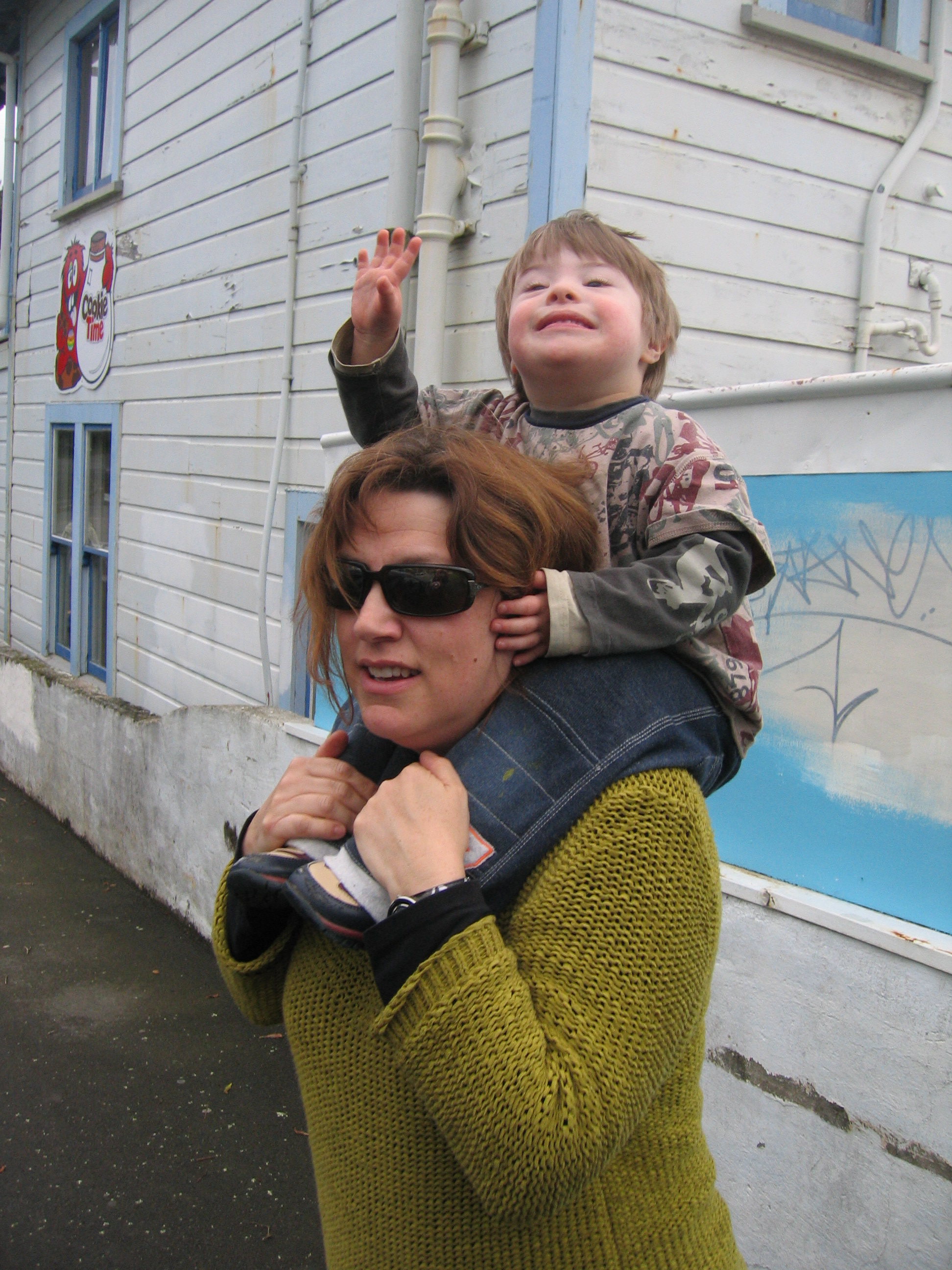
A pisty-poll

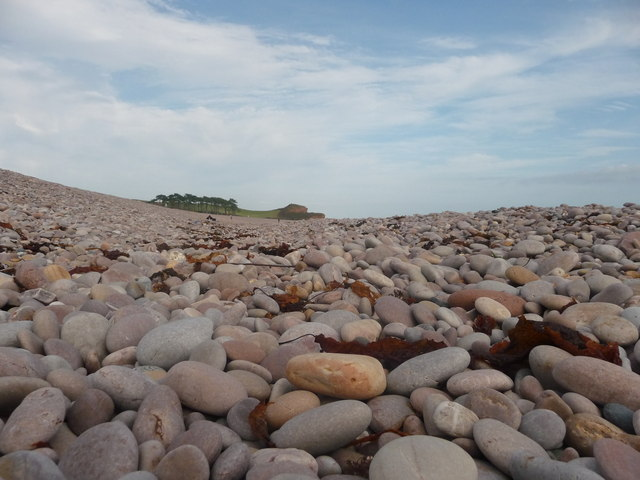
Popples

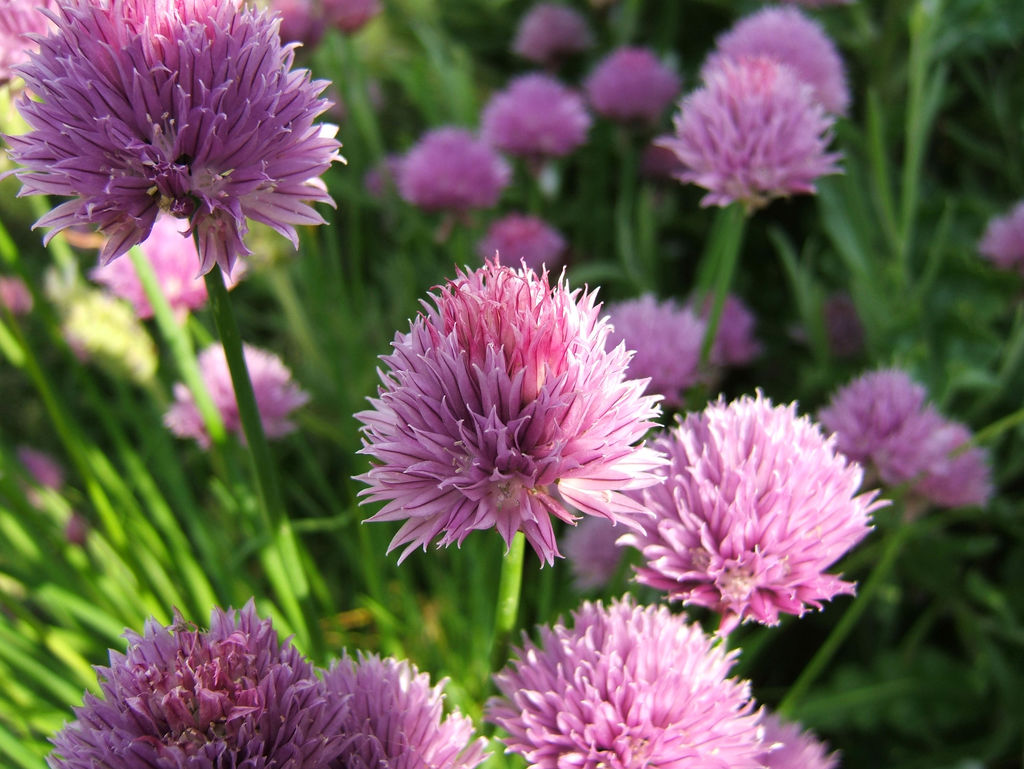
Sives

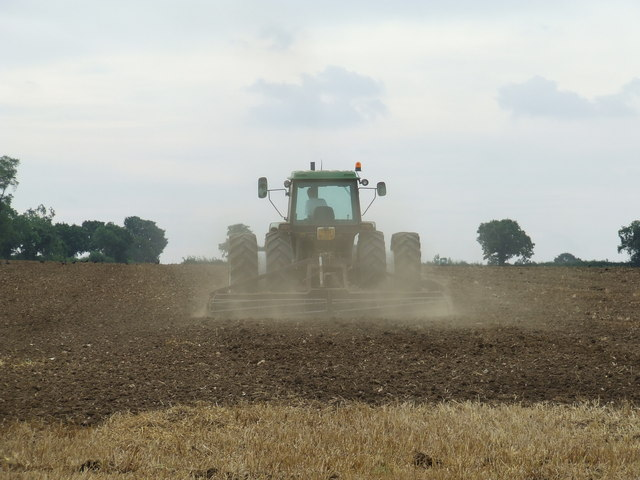
A smeech

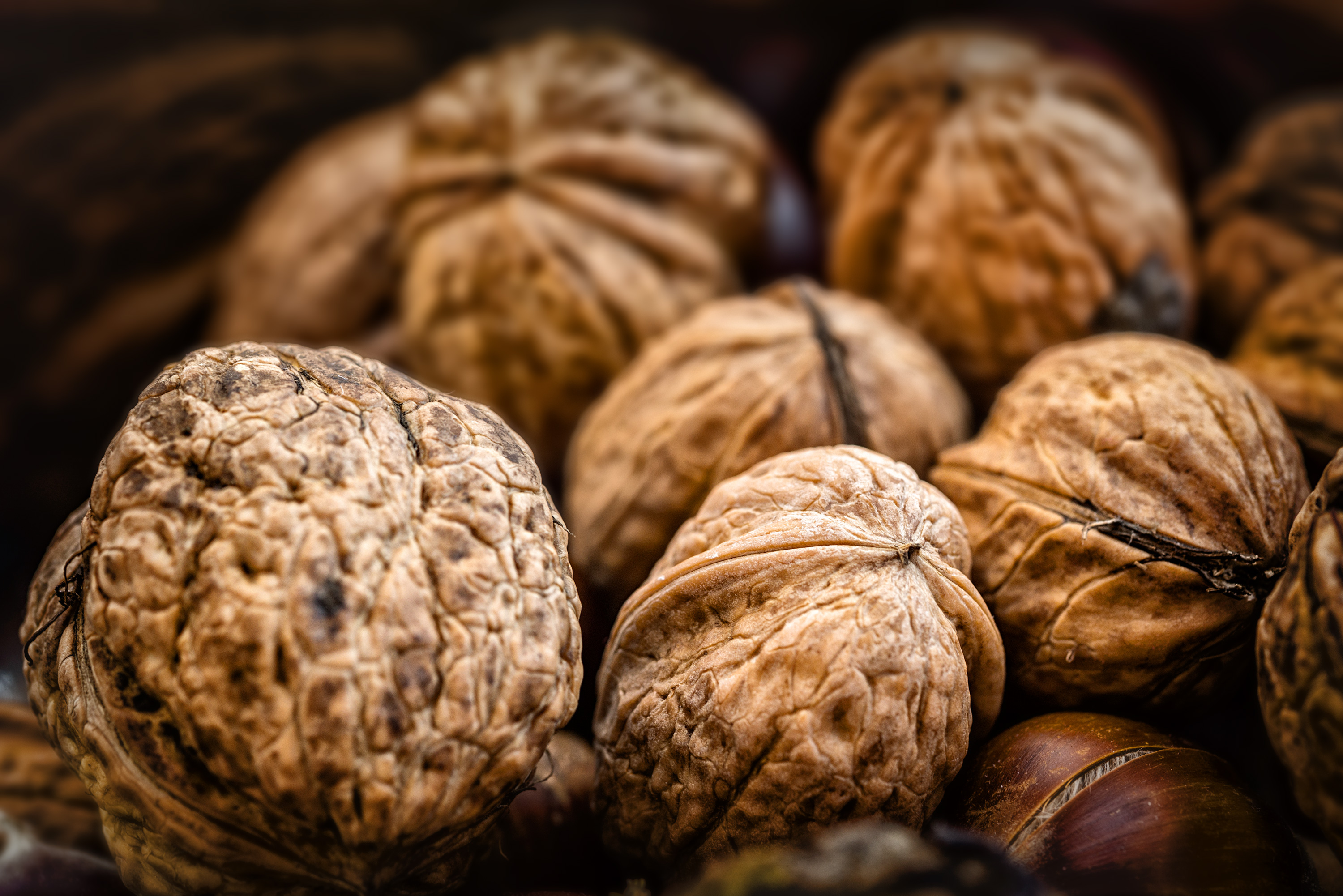
Welshnuts

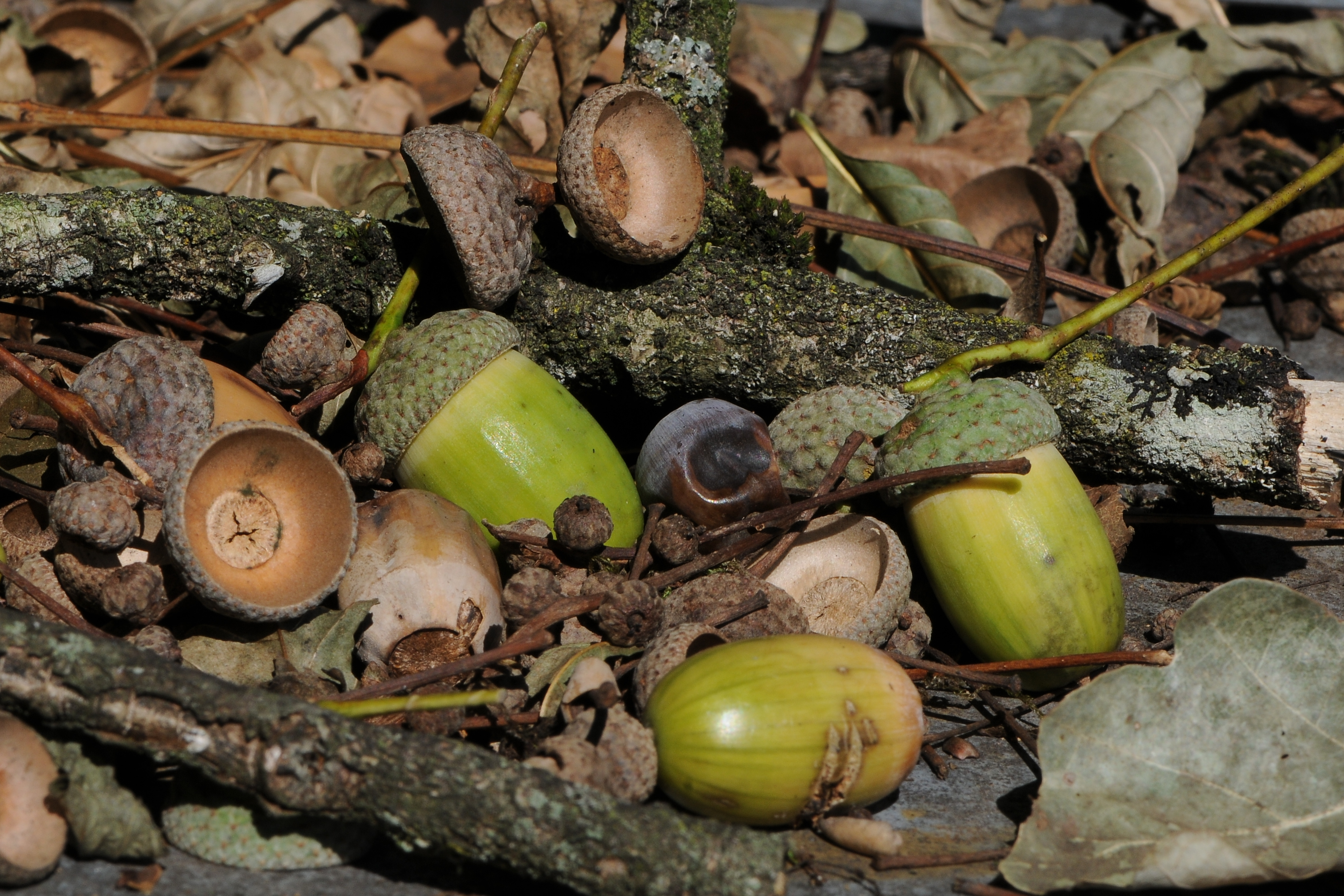
Yakkers

Word	Meaning
A
A-cothed	Disease
A-drawen	Drawing, for example "He be a-drawen a picture."
A-feard	Afraid (Dorset motto, "Who's a-feard?")
Aggy	The act of collecting eggs
Ailen	illness, ailing (verb or noun)
Amper	Pustules "I be all out in an amper!"
Annan?	An interjectional exclamation. "What did you say?"
Anewst, or Aniste	At nearest
Anigh	Near, close by
Ankly	The ankle
Any-when	At any time
Archet	Orchard
Asker	Water newt
A-strout	Stretched out
A-stooded	Stood (as a waggon) immovably in the ground
A-vroze	Frozen
Axen	Ashes
B
Backhouse	Outhouse
Backside	backyard or rear of property
Ballyrag	To scold
Bandy	A stick used for beating dung out of the way, usually long and sturdy with a bent end
Barken	Barley
Barry	Borrow
Batch	Hillock
Bee-pot	Beehive
Bennits	The bent tips of grasses and similar
Bibber	Shiver with cold
Bide	Dwell
Biddle	Beetle
Bit-an'-drap	A bite to eat and a drink
Bit-an'-crimp	Every last scrap of something
Blatch	Black or sooty
Blather	An uproar
Blooth	Blossom
Brinton or Braton	Bold, audacious
Brockle	Broken
Bruckly or Brickley	Brittle
Bumbye	By-and-by
C
Caddie	An uproar or carry-on
Caddle	Muddle
Chump	A log of wood
Clavy	Mantelpiece
Clinker	Icicle
Cockle	Tangle
Cowlease	An uncut field, meadow
Cradlehood	Early stages of childhood, infancy, still in the cradle
Cricket	A low stool or chair for a child
D
Dadder	To confuse or bewilder
Dander	Vex, anger
Dewbit	A bite to eat taken first thing in the morning before breakfast
Drawlatcheten	Idle, lazy
Duckish	Dark, gloomy
Drong	Squeeze or compress
Drongway	A narrow passage or alley; Most commonly a narrow footpath between two fenced fields
Dumbledore	Bumblebee
E
Emmets	Ants
F
Faddle	To pack or bundle together
Flummocks	To scare or frighten
Frith	Thin twigs that have broken off from trees and bushes, historically used to make brushes; brushwood
G
Gake	To stare open-mouthed, gawk, gape
Gallycrow	Scarecrow
Gannywedge	A wide yawn or to spread apart
Gilcup or Giltcup	A small, yellow flower of the family Ranunculaceae, common in meadows and pasture; buttercup
Girt	Large, great
Glene	To joke with
Glutch	To swallow
Greygole	A small, blue woodland flower of the hyacinth family; Bluebell
Gwain	Going
Gwains-on	Rowdy behaviour (goings-on)
H
Halterpath	A path for a horse and rider; Bridleway
Han'pat	Nearby, close at hand
Hethcropper	A horse or pony bred on a heath
Hidy-buck	Children's game, hide-n-seek
Hobby Horse	Woodlouse
Homhle	A duck
Hoss-stinger or Ho's adder	Dragonfly
I
Ice-candles	Icicles
Inon	Onion
J
Joppety-joppety	Anxious, nervous trepidation
K
Keech	To clear a riverbank of weeds
L
Leery	Hungry
Limber	Skinny, slim, slender
Lippen	Wet weather, rainy, sometimes also referred to as lippy
Lisome	Cheery, happy
Litter	Confusion
M
Mampus	A crowd
Mesh	Moss
N
Nammet	A light lunch of meat
Nicky	Kindling
Nippy	Peckish
Nirrup	Donkey
Not	Flowerbed
Nuncheon	A noon-time meal, luncheon
O
Out ov ban	Instantly, at once
P
Peart	Healthy, vibrant, full of life
Pelt	A rage, to feel angry
Pisty poll	To carry a child on one's shoulders with their legs around your neck and their arms around your forehead.
Popples	Pebbles
Prog	Food
Q
Quine	The corner of a wall
Quob	Quiver, shake
R
Rale	Walk
Ramshacklum	Useless
Rap	Swap, barter or exchange
Rathe	Early
Rean	Consume food quickly and greedily
Reaphook	A curved blade for cutting grasses; Sickle
Reddick	Small garden bird with a red breast, commonly known as a robin (Erithacus rubecula)
Reeve	Unravel
Rottletrap	Rickety
S
Satepoll	A foolish or silly person
Scaly	Mean, stingy
Sives	Chives or garlic
Smeech	A cloud of dust
Snabble	To snap up quickly; To eat quickly or greedily
Span-new	Clean and shiny, like new
Sprak	Spry, lively
T
Tilty	Grumpy, irritable, ill-tempered
Tinklebobs	Icicles
Torrididdle	A state of bewilderment or confusion
Toyear	This year; as in today, tomorrow etc.
Twanketen	Sad, melancholic
U
Undercreepen	Devious, sly, underhand
Upsydown	Upside down, overturned
V
Vang	To earn
Vinny	Veiny or mouldy, like the Dorset cheese, Blue-vinny
Vitty	Neat and proper
W
Ware	Pond
Welshnut	Walnut
Werret	To concern or worry
Wont	Mole, small burrowing mammal of the family Talpidae
Woppen	Big, heavy
Wopsy or Wops	Wasp
Wordle	World
Y
Yakker	Acorn
Yis	Earthworm
Yop	Speak rapidly, jabber
Z
Zeale or Zack	Sack
Zet up	To anger, infuriate
Zummat	Something
Zwail	Swagger

== In literature ==
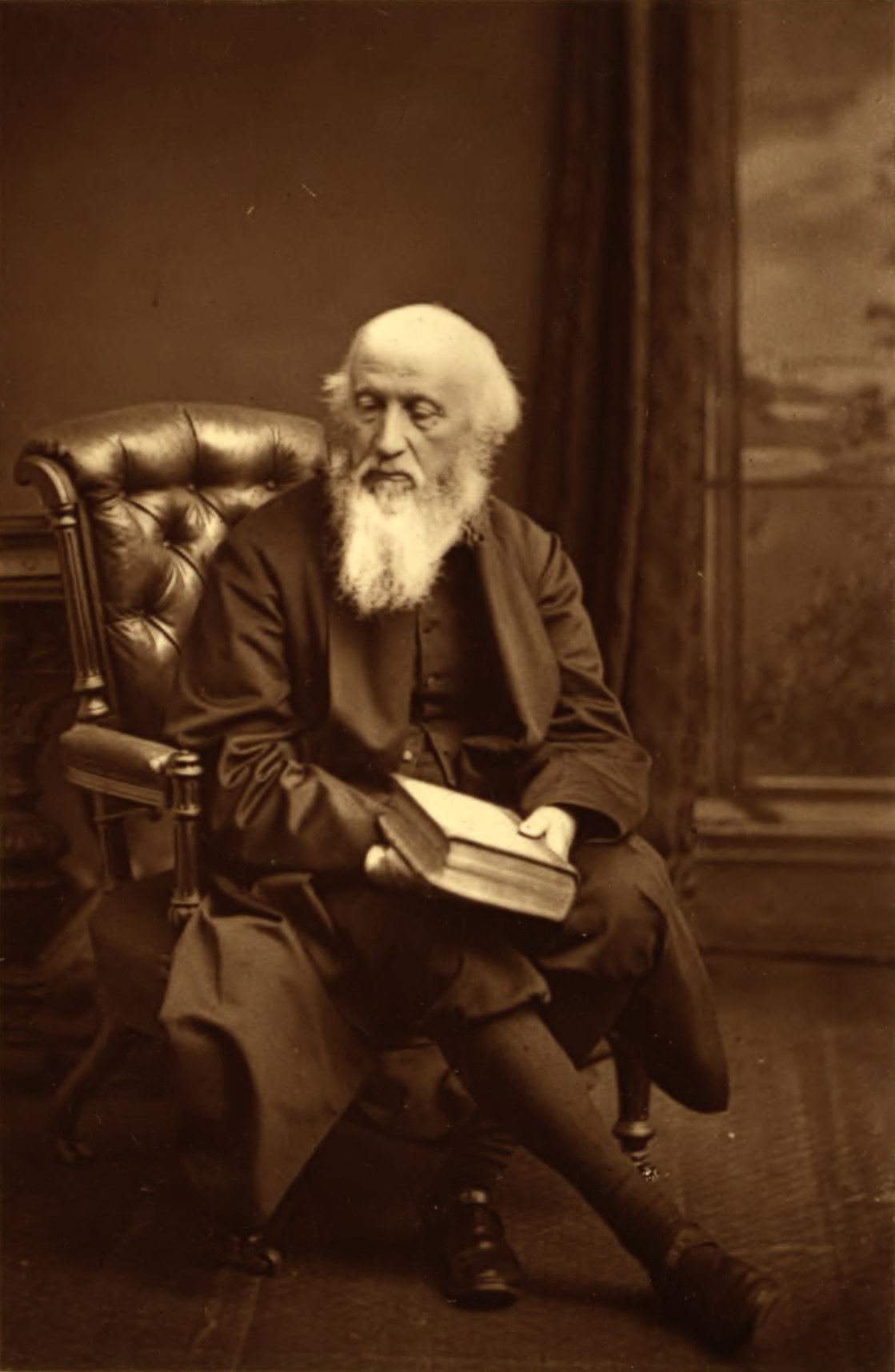
William Barnes wrote poems in his native Dorset dialect

William Barnes was born in the Bagber in 1801. He wrote three volumes poetry in the Dorset dialect, the first, Poems of Rural Life in the Dorset Dialect was published in 1844. Barnes hated what he called 'foreign' words and avoided the use of them in his poetry, preferring instead to use the Saxon language. Where there was no Saxon equivalent for modern terms, Barnes would retronymically concoct words and phrases, such as 'push wainling' for perambulator. Barnes had studied Celtic literature and often used a repetition of consonantal sounds known as cynghanedd. This is particularly noticeable in the poem, "My Orcha'd in Linden Lea".

Barnes also produced works about the phonology, grammar and vocabulary of the Dorset dialect: "A Grammar and Glossary of the Dorset Dialect", published in 1863, and a much expanded version, "A Glossary of the Dorset Dialect with Grammar of its Word-shapening and Wording", in 1886.

Another poet who wrote in the local dialect was Robert Young whose work includes, "Rabin Hill's Visit to the Railway: What he Zeed and Done, and What he Zed About It", published in two parts in 1864, and "Rabin Hill's Excursion to Western-Super-Mare to see the Opening of the New Peir", published in 1867.

Thomas Hardy, the renowned Dorset novelist, contributed Dorset dialect words to Joseph Wright’s "English Dialect Dictionary" and the "Oxford English Dictionary". Hardy also had his poetry published but used a mixture of Dorset dialect and standard English. Instead of writing in the Dorset dialect, like Barnes and Young, Hardy used it only in his characters' dialogue.

J. K. Rowling used the Dorset dialect word for a bumblebee, dumbledore, for one of the characters in her Harry Potter books, whom she saw as bumbling about his study, humming to himself.

Musician and Dorset native PJ Harvey composed her book-length narrative poem Orlam in the Dorset dialect, and later used it in her album I Inside the Old Year Dying.

== Decline ==
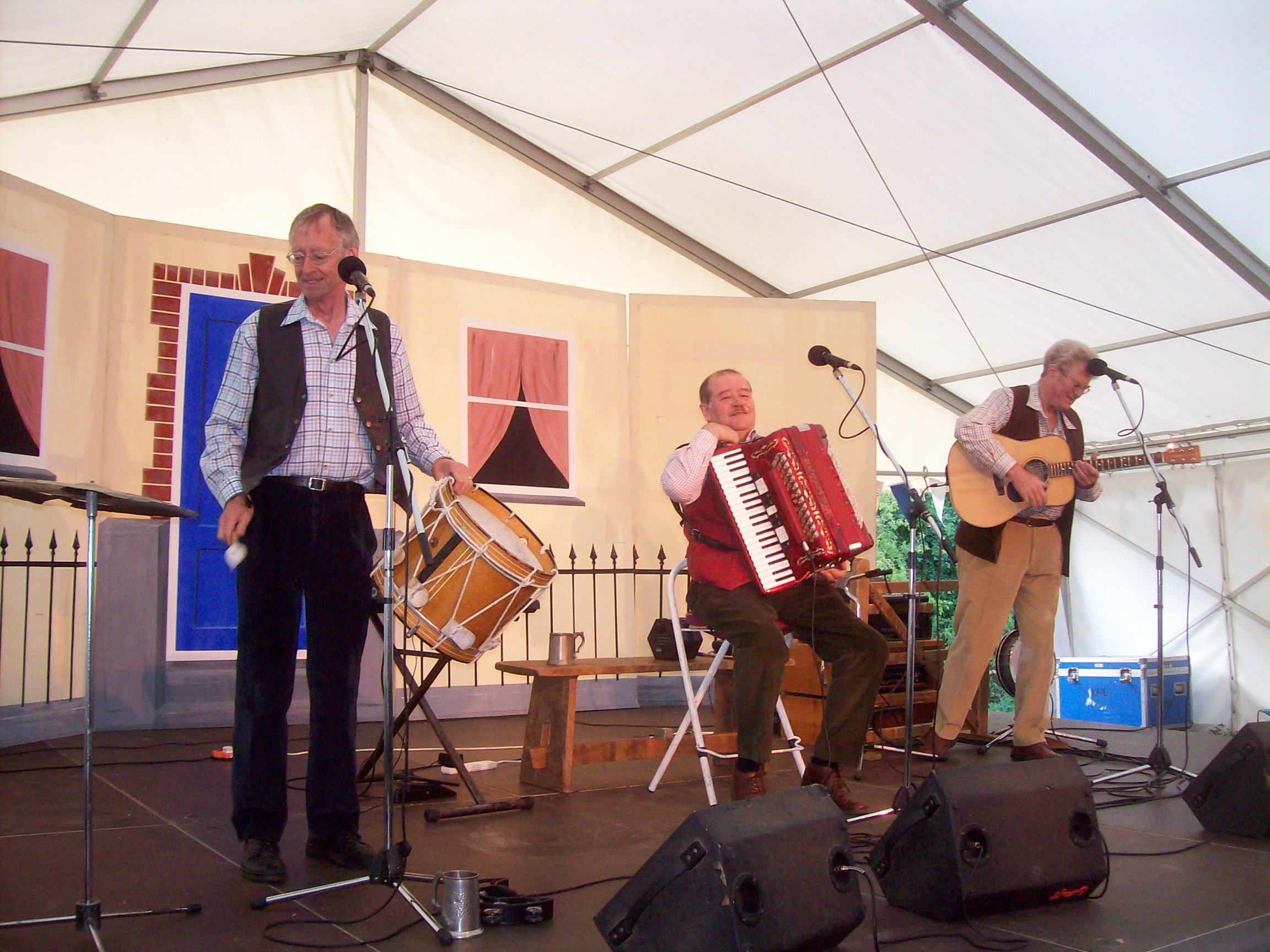
The Dorset dialect features in the music of The Yetties, a folk group from Yetminster

Preserved in the isolated Blackmore Vale, use of the dialect began to decline from the mid-nineteenth century when it was exposed to other English variations. The arrival of the railways around this time brought an influx of tourists to Dorset, while land enclosure and the repeal of the Corn Laws, caused mass unemployment in the mainly rural county, forcing farmers to seek work in other parts of the country. Attempts to standardise English began as early as the 16th century and by the mid-nineteenth century had also had a profound effect on local dialects, particularly in the south-west. Dialect was actively discouraged in schools at this time and the introduction of compulsory education for young children hastened its decline. Thomas Hardy noted in 1883 that, "Having attended the National School they [the children] would mix the printed tongue as taught therein with the unwritten, dying, Wessex English they had learnt of their parents, the result of this transitional state of affairs being a composite language without rule or harmony".

It has also been suggested by Jason Sullock in his 2012 book, "Oo do ee think ee are?", that West Country dialects are a source of some derision, leading many local speakers to water them down or abandon them all together. The same point is made in Alan Chedzoy's, "The People's Poet: William Barnes of Dorset".

However the Dorset dialect is still spoken in some villages. It also features in the Scrumpy and Western music of Dorset bands like The Yetties, Who's Afeard and The Skimmity Hitchers, and is kept alive in the literature of Thomas Hardy, William Barnes and Robert Young.

== See also ==
- William Barnes
- The Yetties
