= Joseph Clark (painter) =

English painter

Joseph Clark ROI
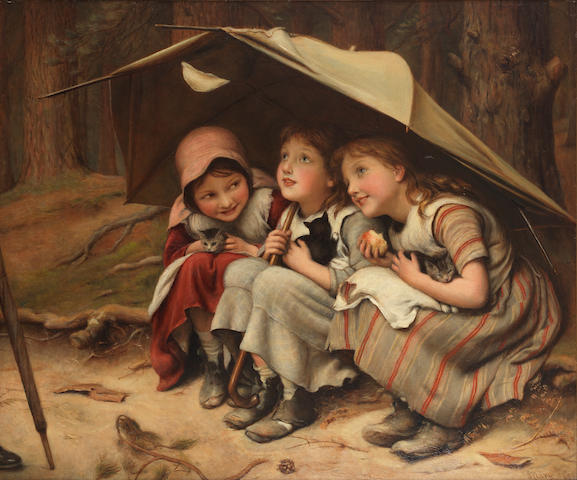
- Clark's "Three little kittens", 1883
- Born: 4 July 1834; Cerne Abbas, Dorset, England
- Died: 4 July 1926 (aged 92); Ramsgate, Thanet, Kent, England
- Education: J. M. Leigh's Art School
- Known for: Painting
- Notable work: domestic scenes
- Spouse: Annie Jones

Joseph Clark (4 July 1834 – 4 July 1926) was an English oil painter, well known in the Victorian era for his domestic scenes, especially of children.

== Life ==
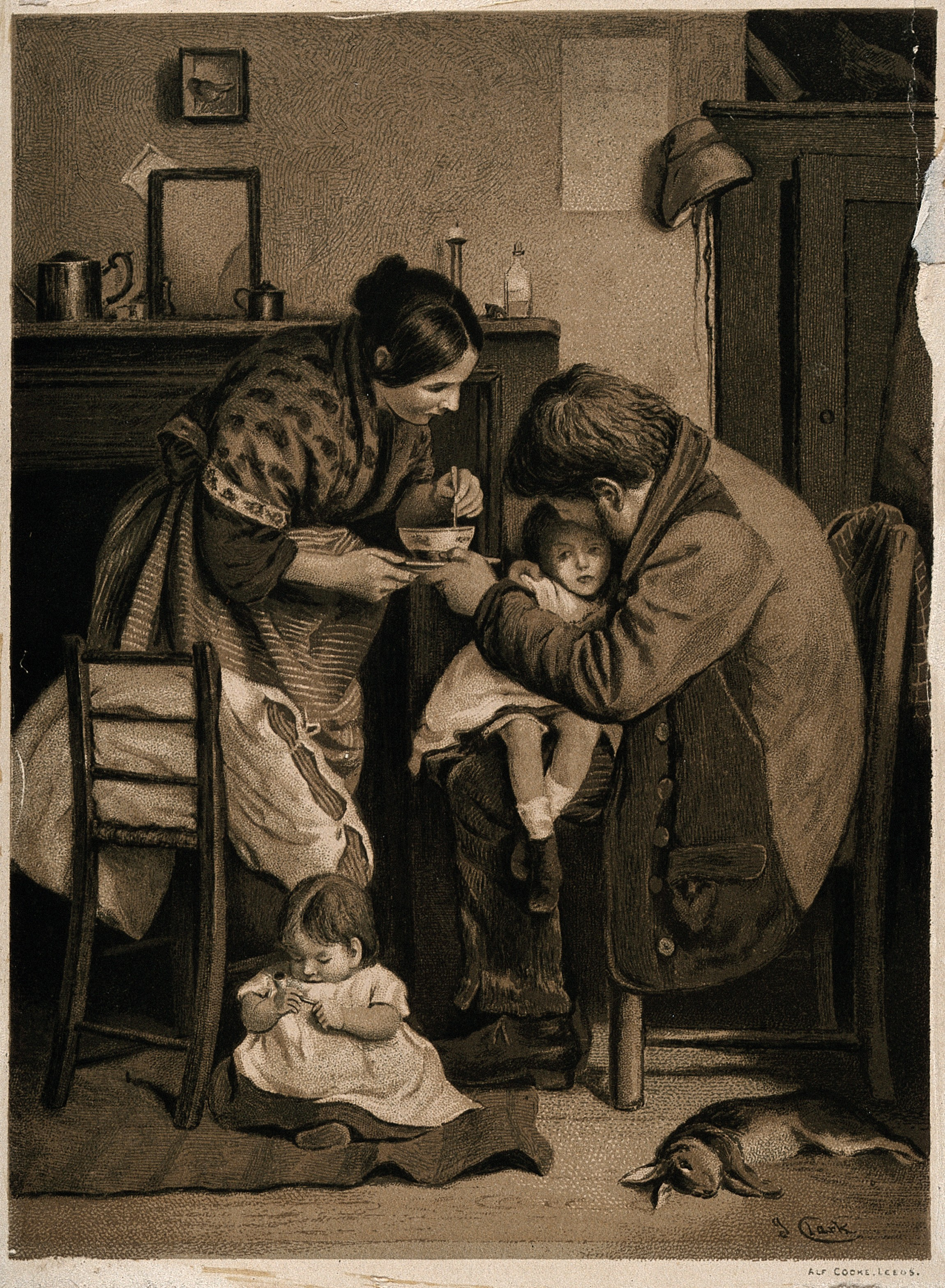
Clark's "A sick child", 1857

Born in 1834 in Cerne Abbas, Dorset, from the age of eleven Clark was educated as a boarder by William Barnes at his school in Dorchester, and according to a study of the school "exploited Barnes's training perhaps more successfully than any other pupil".

His parents brought Clark up as a member of the Swedenborgian New Church, and he remained a member all his life. By 1851, Clark's father had died, and he was living at 13, Long Street, Cerne Abbas, with his widowed mother, who was a retired draper, and two older unmarried sisters, Mary and Emma. (Note: 1851 United Kingdom census, Long Street, Cerne Abbas at ancestry.co.uk, accessed 8 October 2020 (subscription required)) He went on to train at J. M. Leigh's art school and became a successful artist at an early age, exhibiting at the Royal Academy between 1857 and 1904. Victorian Painters sums him up as a "painter of domestic genre of a tender and affecting nature, usually of children and a few biblical subjects". He was elected a Member of the Institute of Oil Painters, which had a membership limited to one hundred. Some of his paintings were named in the Dorset dialect, in which his schoolmaster William Barnes wrote poetry. "Jeanes Wedden Day in Mornen", which is also the title of a poem by Barnes, is an example of this.

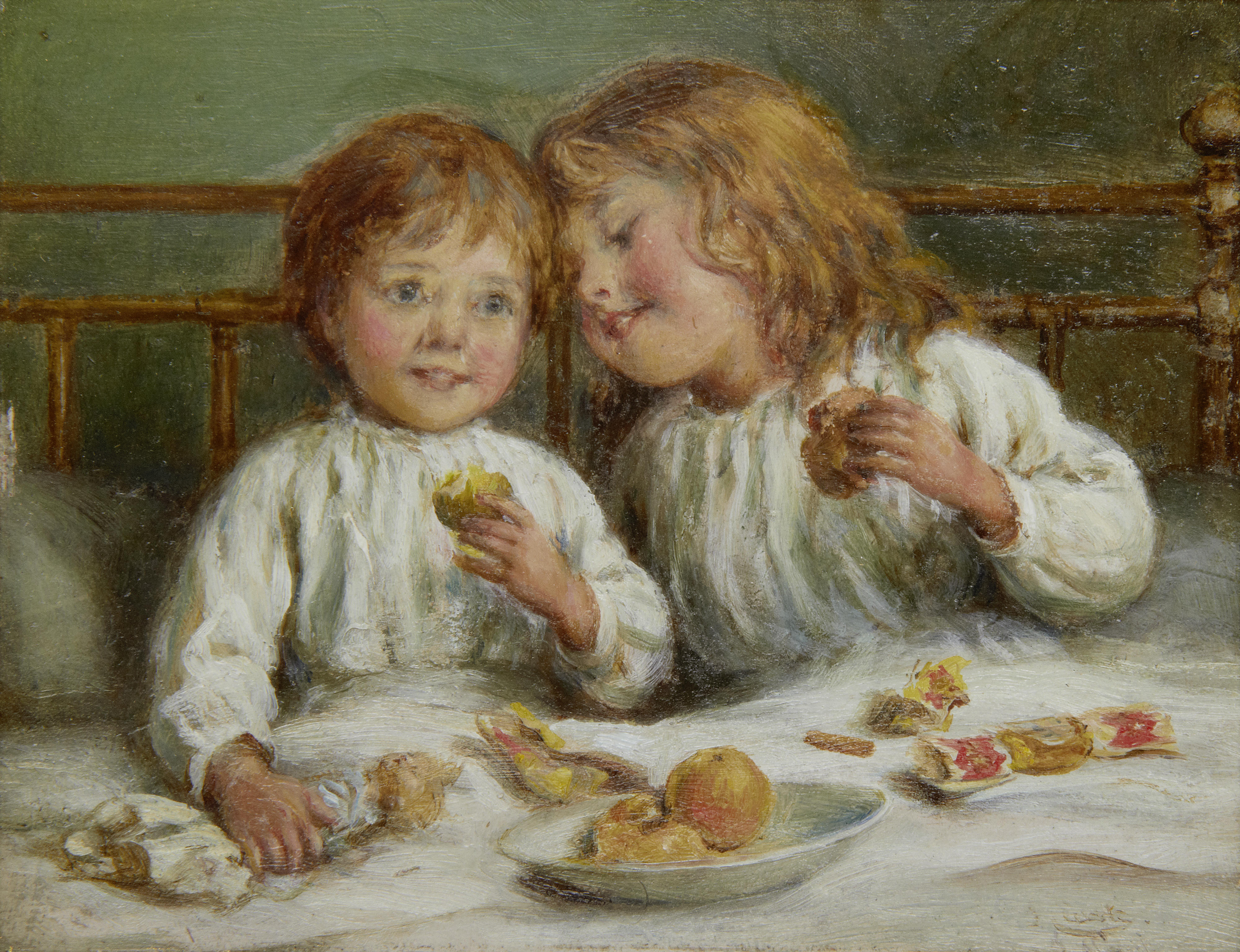
“Christmas morning”

In 1868, at Winchester, Clark married Annie Jones, a daughter of John Jones, of Winchester, and they went on to have one son and three daughters. (Note: "Jones, Annie, Winchester 2c 184" and "Clark, Joseph, Winchester 2c 184" in General Index to Marriages in England and Wales, 1868) He was also the uncle of another artist, Joseph Benwell Clark.

Clark died at 95 Hereson Road, Ramsgate, Kent, on 4 July 1926, his 92nd birthday. (Note: "Clark, Joseph, 92 / Thanet 2a 1037" in General Index to Deaths in England and Wales, 1926)
