= The Yetties of Yetminster =

Studio album by The Yetties
- Released: 1975
- Genre: Folk
- Label: Argo Records (UK)
- Producer: Kevin Daly

The Yetties chronology
The World of the Yetties (1975)	The Yetties of Yetminster (1975)	The Village Band (1976)

The Yetties of Yetminster is the eighth album by English folk music group The Yetties from the North Dorset village of Yetminster. It was released in 1975 on the Argo Records (UK) label.

== Track listing ==
Side 1

1. "The Gypsy Rover" (Maguire)
2. "Bandy Bertha’s Birthday" (Hargreaves/Tilsey)
3. "One Morning in May" (Trad. Arr. The Yetties)
4. "Widdecombe Fair" (Trad. Arr. The Yetties)
5. "Downfield’s Delight" (Trad. Arr. The Yetties)
6. "Bread and Fishes" (Bell)
7. "The Gentleman Soldier" (Trad. Arr. The Yetties)

Side 2

1. "Dark Island" (Maclachlan/Silv)
2. "On a Monday Morning" (Tawney)
3. "Fling it Here (Fling it There)" (Lawrence/Yetties)
4. "The Marrow" (Oakley)
5. "Lord of the Dance" (Carter)
6. "Beau Psaltery" (Trad. Arr. The Yetties)
7. "The Farming Contractor" (Trad. Arr. The Yetties)
8. "Trelawney" (Trad.)

== Musicians ==
- Bob Common - vocal & drums
- Pete Shutler - accordion, whistle, psaltery & vocal
- Bonny Sartin - lead vocal
- Mac McCulloch - guitar & vocal
- with Dave Green - bass, and the Alan Cohen Orchestra

(Alan Cohen Orchestra recorded by Iain Churches)

== Production ==
- Produced and recorded by: Kevin Daly
