= Joseph Clement Clark =

American politician and physician (1858–1929)

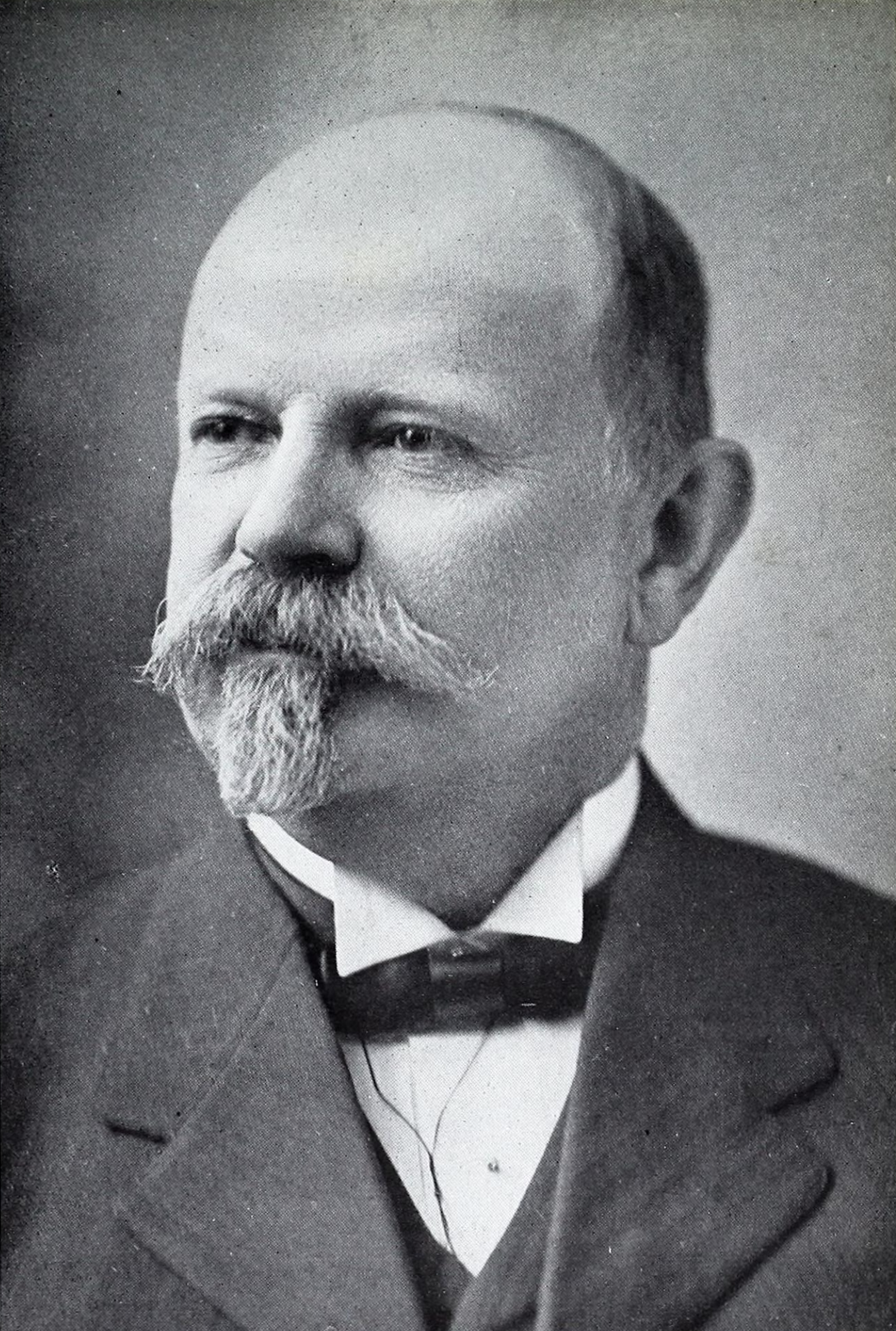
- Clark in 1914 publication

Member of the Maryland House of Delegates
- In office 1896

Personal details
- Born: August 3, 1858 Talbot County, Maryland, U.S.
- Died: May 28, 1929 (aged 70) Sykesville, Maryland, U.S.
- Resting place: Hill Crest Cemetery; Federalsburg, Maryland, U.S.
- Party: Democratic
- Spouse: Mary Greer
- Education: St. John's College
- Alma mater: University of Maryland School of Medicine (MD)
- Occupation: Politician; physician

Joseph Clement Clark (August 3, 1858 – May 28, 1929) was a politician and physician. He served as a member of the Maryland House of Delegates, representing Caroline County, in 1896. He served as superintendent of the Springfield State Hospital for the Insane from 1899 to his death in 1929.

== Early life ==
Joseph Clement Clark was born on August 3, 1858, in Kingston, Talbot County, Maryland, to Anne E. (née Mowbray) and Clement Stephen Clark. His family moved to Caroline County shortly after Clark was born. Clark studied at St. John's College, but left after three years due to ill health. He then worked at a drug store. Clark returned to school and graduated from the University of Maryland School of Medicine in 1880 with a Doctor of Medicine.

== Career ==
Clark settled in Federalsburg, Maryland, and served as president of the town council in 1888 and as county health officer from 1892 to 1896. He was elected as a Democrat to the Maryland House of Delegates, representing Caroline County, and served in 1896. His service on the Public Institutions Committee made Clark interested in state hospital work.

Clark served as the first assistant superintendent of Spring Grove Hospital in Catonsville, replacing George H. Rohe who went to Springfield State Hospital for the Insane as superintendent, from 1897 to 1898. He was appointed superintendent of Springfield State Hospital for the Insane in Sykesville in 1899, after George H. Rohe's death. Clark served in this role until his death.

Clark was a member of the American Medical Association, American Medio-Psychological Association and the Medical and Chirurgical Association. He also served as a charter member of the Maryland Psychiatric Society and a member of the American Psychiatric Society. He was the organizer of the Eastern Shore Society in 1914 and served as its first president.

== Personal life ==
Clark married Mary Greer.

Clark died on May 28, 1929, at his home at the Springfield State Hospital in Sykesville. He was buried at Hill Crest Cemetery in Federalsburg.
