= The Yetties =

English folk music group from Yetminster

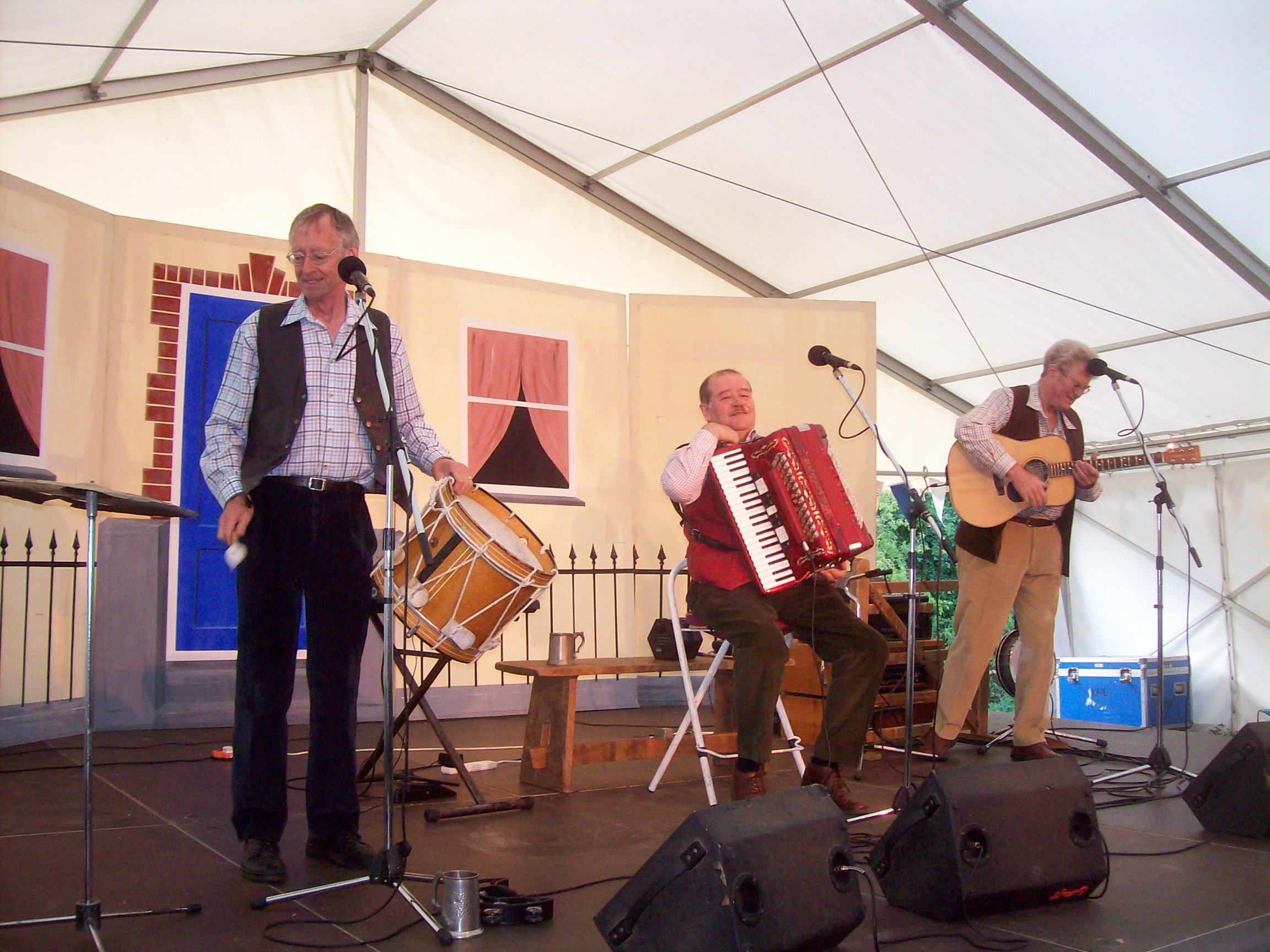
Sartin, Shutler and McCulloch

The Yetties were an English folk music group from Yetminster, who took their name from the Dorset village, their childhood home of the same name. They formed in 1961 and turned professional in 1967. Their first line-up was Bob Common, Mac McCulloch, John "Bonny" Sartin and Pete Shutler. Bob Common left in 1979. Roger Trim was a fourth member from 1984 to 1991. The Yetties retired in 2011.

== History ==
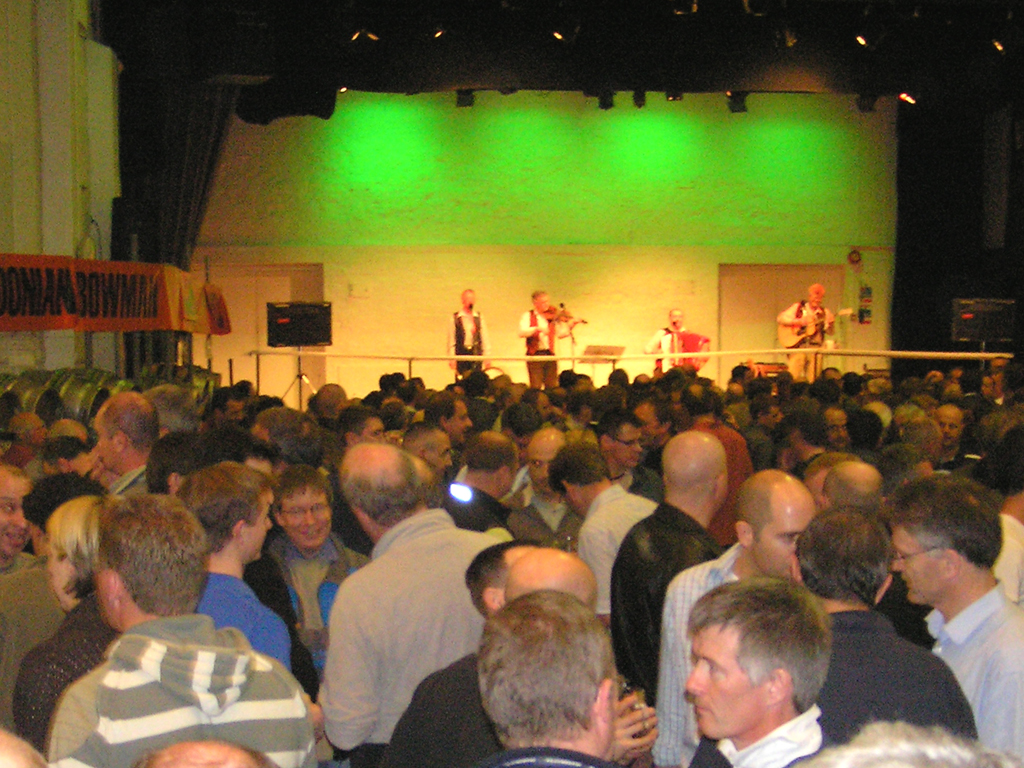
The Yetties performing at Farnham Beer Festival in 2008

Shutler was the lead musician, primarily playing accordion, but also concertina, penny whistle and bowed psaltery; McCulloch played guitar and other stringed instruments; Sartin led the songs; Common played percussion and sang; Trim played fiddle.

After turning professional in 1967, their music took them from Dorset all over the UK; appearing in Europe and, under the auspices of the British Council, they performed in many countries, including Thailand, Nepal, Sri Lanka, Malaysia, Hong Kong, Singapore, Pakistan, Sudan, India, Bangladesh, the Maldives, the Philippines, Ethiopia and Canada.

Over the years they recorded 45 albums (on various labels). Most of these were a mixture of songs, instrumental folk-dance music and poetry. They also undertook topic-based projects. The Dorset writer, Thomas Hardy, was also a musician; he and his family, over several generations, collected hundreds of folk tunes. The Yetties made two recordings on Thomas Hardy's own fiddle and other Hardy family instruments. Another Yetties' projects involved recording a collection of songs and stories about cricketers of the past with John Arlott.

The Yetties broadcast a regular BBC Radio 2 series, Cider & Song. They also made numerous other radio and television appearances. They were often asked back to locations, becoming regular performers at various annual events, including the Farnham Beer Exhibition and many more.

The Yetties lived in Sherborne (a few miles from Yetminster) and drew on their experiences of country life for their concert programmes. Some songs recalled life when they were children, helping farmers harvest; scrumping apples; raiding hedges, fields and woods for food and eating rabbit for seemingly every meal. They talked of village characters and village occasions, conveying an atmosphere of bygone village society.

== Retirement ==
The Yetties announced their retirement in early 2010, and their final performance was a ceilidh and concert at Sherborne in April 2011.

On the evening of 21 September 2014, it was announced on the official Yetties website that Pete Shutler had died in Sherborne Hospital. Mac McCulloch died on 15 December 2021. Bob Common died on 26 June 2026.

== Album discography ==
- Fifty Stone of Loveliness (1969)
- Who's A-fear'd? (1970)
- Keep A-Runnin' - It's The Yetties! (1970)
- Our Friends, The Yetties (1971)
- Dorset Is Beautiful (1972)
- All at Sea (1973)
- Up in Arms (1974)
- Let's Have a Party (1975)
- The World of the Yetties (1975)
- The Yetties of Yetminster (1975)
- The World of The Yetties (1975) (compilation LP)
- The Village Band (1976)
- Upmarket (1977)
- Dorset Style (1978)
- Focus on The Yetties (1978) (compilation LP)
- In Concert (1979)
- A Little Bit of Dorset (1981)
- A Proper Job (1981)
- Folk N Brass (1982)
- On the Fiddle (1982)
- Cider 'n' Song (1983)
- The Banks of Newfoundland (1984)
- The Sound of Cricket (1984)
- The Musical Heritage of Thomas Hardy (single cassette) (1985)
- The Yetties (1986)
- The Musical Heritage of Thomas Hardy (double LP) (1988)
- Play it Again (1989)
- Singing All The Way (1989)
- Out in the Green Fields (1990)
- The Fiddler Knows (1990)
- Looking for the Sunshine (1991)
- Come to the Yetties' Barn Dance (1992)
- Dorset, My Dorset (1993)
- Singalong Party 'Cigarettes & Whisky & Wild Wild Singing' (1995)
- Top of the Crops (1995)
- Folk Music of England (1997)
- In Praise of Dorset (1997)
- Wild Mountain Thyme (1999)
- Musical Allsorts (2000)
- Rolling Home To England (2001)
- Messing About on the River (2003)
- Rambleaway (2005)
