= Pitt-Rivers =

== Name Origin ==
Pitt-Rivers is an English surname adopted by later holders of the peerage Baron Rivers. Holders of the surname include:

- Horace Pitt-Rivers, 3rd Baron Rivers (1777–1831); born William Beckford, adopted the name on inheriting the title from his brother-in-law George Pitt, 2nd Baron Rivers
- George Pitt-Rivers, 4th Baron Rivers (1810–1866), elder son of Horace (1777–1831)
- Henry Pitt-Rivers, 5th Baron Rivers (1849–1867), son of George (1810–1866)
- Horace Pitt-Rivers, 6th Baron Rivers (1814–1880), younger son of Horace (1777–1831)

The surname was adopted by the ethnologist and archaeologist Augustus Henry Lane-Fox (1827–1900) when he inherited from Horace in 1880. (He was Horace's second-cousin, via a different daughter of George Pitt, 2nd Baron). Augustus Pitt Rivers founded the Pitt Rivers Museum at the University of Oxford. His descendants include:

- George Pitt-Rivers (1890–1966), anthropologist, grandson of Augustus
- Rosalind Pitt-Rivers (1907–1990), physiologist, joint discoverer of the thyroid hormone triiodothyronine, second wife of the above
- Michael Pitt-Rivers (1917–1999), George (1890–1966)'s son, who gained notoriety when put on trial charged with buggery
- Julian Pitt-Rivers (1919–2001), anthropologist and ethnographer, the second son
- (George) Anthony Lane Fox Pitt-Rivers (born 1932), third son, who married in 1964 Valerie, who was Lord Lieutenant of Dorset 2006–2014.
