= Joseph Clarke (physician) =

Irish physician (1758–1834)

- Born: 8 April 1758
- Died: 10 September 1834 (aged 76); Edinburgh
- Occupation: Physician

Joseph Clarke (8 April 1758 – 10 September 1834) was an Irish physician.

== Biography ==
Clarke was the second son of James Clarke, agriculturist, was born in Desertlin parish, co. Londonderry, on 8 April 1758. He studied arts at Glasgow from 1775 to 1776, and medicine at Edinburgh in 1776–1779, graduating in September 1779. In the spring of 1781 he attended William Hunter's lectures in London, and received a stimulus to obstetrical studies, which determined him to settle in Dublin as an accoucheur. Becoming pupil in 1781 and assistant physician in 1783 at the Lying-in Hospital, he was elected master (or physician) of that hospital in 1786, having in the same year married a niece of George Cleghorn, founder of the anatomical school in Trinity College, whom he assisted in his lectures from 1784 to 1788.

Already in 1783, Clarke had suggested the improved ventilation of the Lying-in Hospital, to diminish the serious mortality of infants there within nine days of birth, amounting to one in six, a mortality afterwards reduced to one in nineteen, and later to one in 108. On his appointment as master he began to lecture in the hospital, and established a school of midwifery. On the termination of his seven years of office as master he published (in vol. i. of the ‘Transactions of the King and Queen's College of Physicians in Ireland’) a report of 10,387 cases, recounting in detail all points worthy of note, and forming one of the most valuable records in existence on the subject. It was afterwards supplemented by his notes of 3,878 births in private practice, in which he had not lost one mother from protracted labour (see Collins, Sketch of Clarke). He was remarkable for his abstention from the use of the forceps, which he only employed once in private practice. His receipts in fees of from 10l. to 150l. amounted to 37,252l. He retired from practice in 1829, and died on 10 September 1834 at Edinburgh, while attending the meeting of the British Association there.

Clarke's ‘Observations on the Puerperal Fever,’ originally published in the ‘Edinburgh Medical Commentaries,’ xv. 299, 1790, have been reprinted by Dr. Fleetwood Churchill in ‘Essays on the Puerperal Fever,’ Sydenham Society, 1849. He published several important papers in the ‘Transactions of the Royal Irish Academy,’ of which he was vice-president, among which may be mentioned ‘Remarks on the Causes and Cure of some Diseases of Infancy,’ vol. vi., and ‘On Bilious Colic and Convulsions in Early Infancy,’ vol. xi. Two letters of his to Richard Price, D.D., author of ‘A Treatise on Life Annuities,’ dealing with some causes of the excess of mortality of males above that of females, were printed in the ‘Philosophical Transactions’ for 1786, p. 349.
