= Joseph Benwell Clark =

British painter (1857-1938)

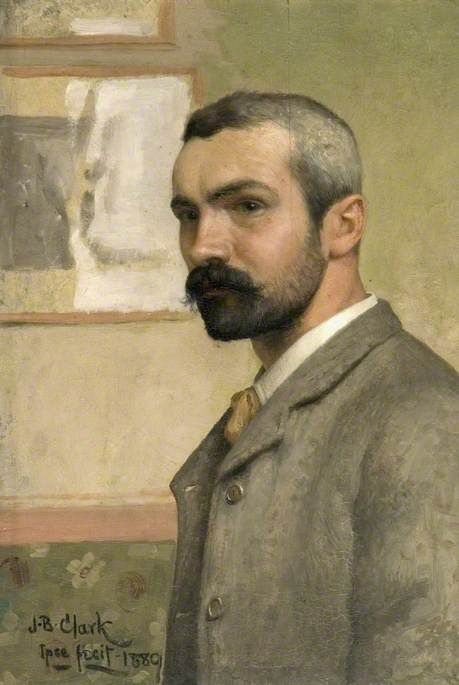
J. B. Clark, self-portrait, 1889

Joseph Benwell Clark (1857 – 13 February 1938) was an English painter, etcher, engraver in mezzotint and drypoint, and book illustrator.

Victorian Painters describes Clark as a London painter of rustic subjects.

== Early life ==
Born at Cerne Abbas, Dorset, Clark was a son of William Henry Clark, linen draper, and his wife Christian Ann Benwell Ellisdon, and was baptized into the Church of England on 24 July 1857. His parents had married at Haggerston, East London, in 1846, and both his grandfathers were drapers. His middle name, Benwell, came from his maternal grandmother, who was Sarah Lovelock Benwell before marrying William Ellisdon.

Clark was a nephew of the painter and illustrator Joseph Clark (1834–1926), who was also a native of Cerne Abbas. The younger Clark later lived with his uncle in Holloway, London, while studying art at the Slade School of Fine Art, under Alphonse Legros, whose best pupil he was. He thus got to know William Strang, another pupil, and they and Charles Holroyd are the three of Legros's students mentioned in Arthur M. Hind's A History of Engraving and Etching. While he was at the Slade, Clark also became a friend of Henry Scott Tuke and the writer Samuel Butler.

In April 1881, Clark was living with his parents, three brothers, and two sisters in Market Square, Cerne Abbas, and stated his occupation for that year's census as "Artist (Fine Arts)". Between 1881 and 1882, Clark and Tuke were art students in the atelier of Jean-Paul Laurens in Paris. Clark's mother died in 1883.

== Career ==
Clark began by making engravings after the paintings of his uncle and also exhibited work at the Royal Academy from 1880 to 1894. In July 1879, his etching of a work of George Frederic Watts, "The Three Goddesses", was reviewed favourably in The Spectator, and the next year under the title "Pallas, Juno, & Venus" was printed in Paris in L'Art. In 1884 his etching "The Dinner Hour" appeared in The Art Journal. In 1889, work by Clark was included in J. S. Virtue's Fifty Choice Examples of Modern Etching, a handsome folio volume containing etchings by Legros, Whistler, Chattock, Macbeth, Foster, Haden, Herkomer, Hunter, Courtry, and others.

In 1891, William Strang portrayed his friend Clark in an etching entitled "The Philosopher", as noted in the 1911 Encyclopædia Britannica. In 1894, a new translation of Lucian of Samosata's True History, with illustrations by Aubrey Beardsley, William Strang, and J. B. Clark, was privately printed in an edition of 251 copies. In 1895, Clark worked with Strang again to illustrate The Surprising Adventures of Baron Munchausen and Sindbad the Sailor and Alibaba and the Forty Thieves, an edition which has been called reminiscent of the structure of Chinese boxes. Clark spent most of his career in London, where as well as painting and engraving he taught. In April 1901, he was sharing rooms in King Henry's Road, Primrose Hill, with two other artists, Richard W. Maddox and Vivian Paulfield, and a fourth artist, Valentine Havers-Morgan, was visiting them. At the time of the census of 1911, Clark was living alone at 19, King Henry's Road, and was Curator of the Schools at the Royal Academy of Arts, Burlington House. He also had a studio at 22 King Henry’s Road, Chalk Farm. In 1921, he retired from his position as Curator, and not long after that returned to live in his native Cerne, where he stayed with a brother and sister until his death in 1938.

Clark died at Cerne Abbas on 13 February 1938 and was buried there, his address being stated as Barnwells. He left property valued at £5,916, equivalent to £344,284 in 2025, and probate was granted to John Henry Clark, draper, and Charles Frederick Fox FSA.

C. F. Fox acquired Clark's self-portrait of 1889 and in 1954 bequeathed it to the Dorset County Museum, Dorchester, which also has other paintings by Clark. A copy of his drypoint engraving of his master Legros is in the National Portrait Gallery, London. Five of his illustrations for The Surprising Adventures of Baron Munchausen, drawn in Indian ink, are in the Prints and Drawings Study Room of the Victoria and Albert Museum.

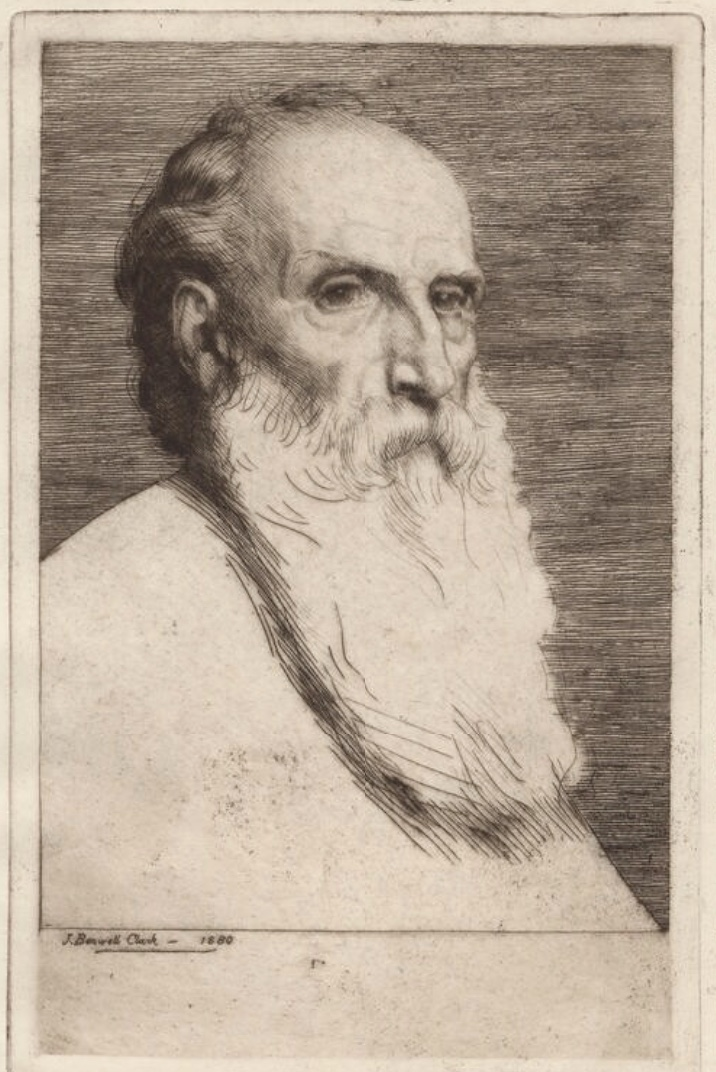
Legros, by Clark, 1880

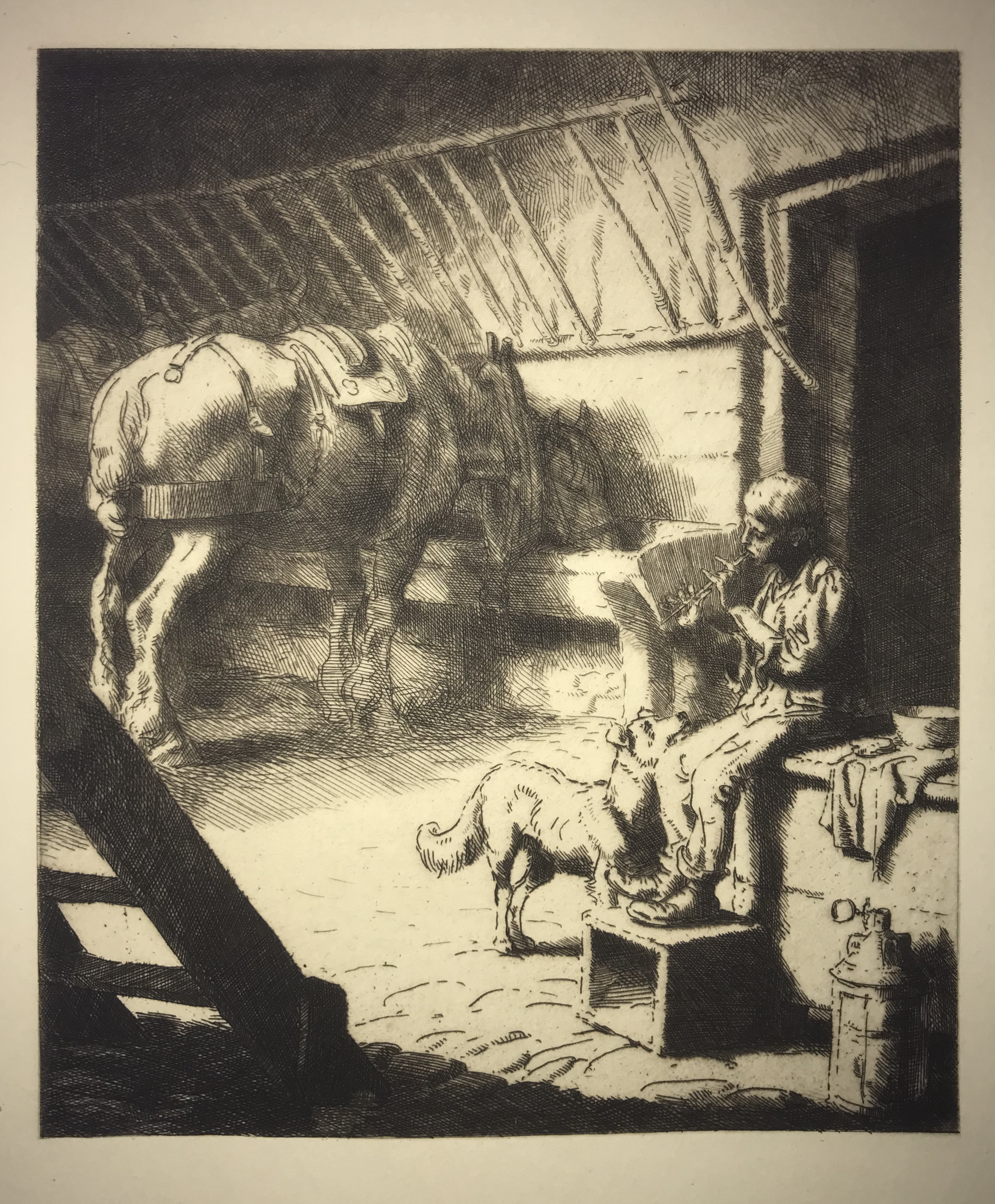
"The Dinner Hour", 1884

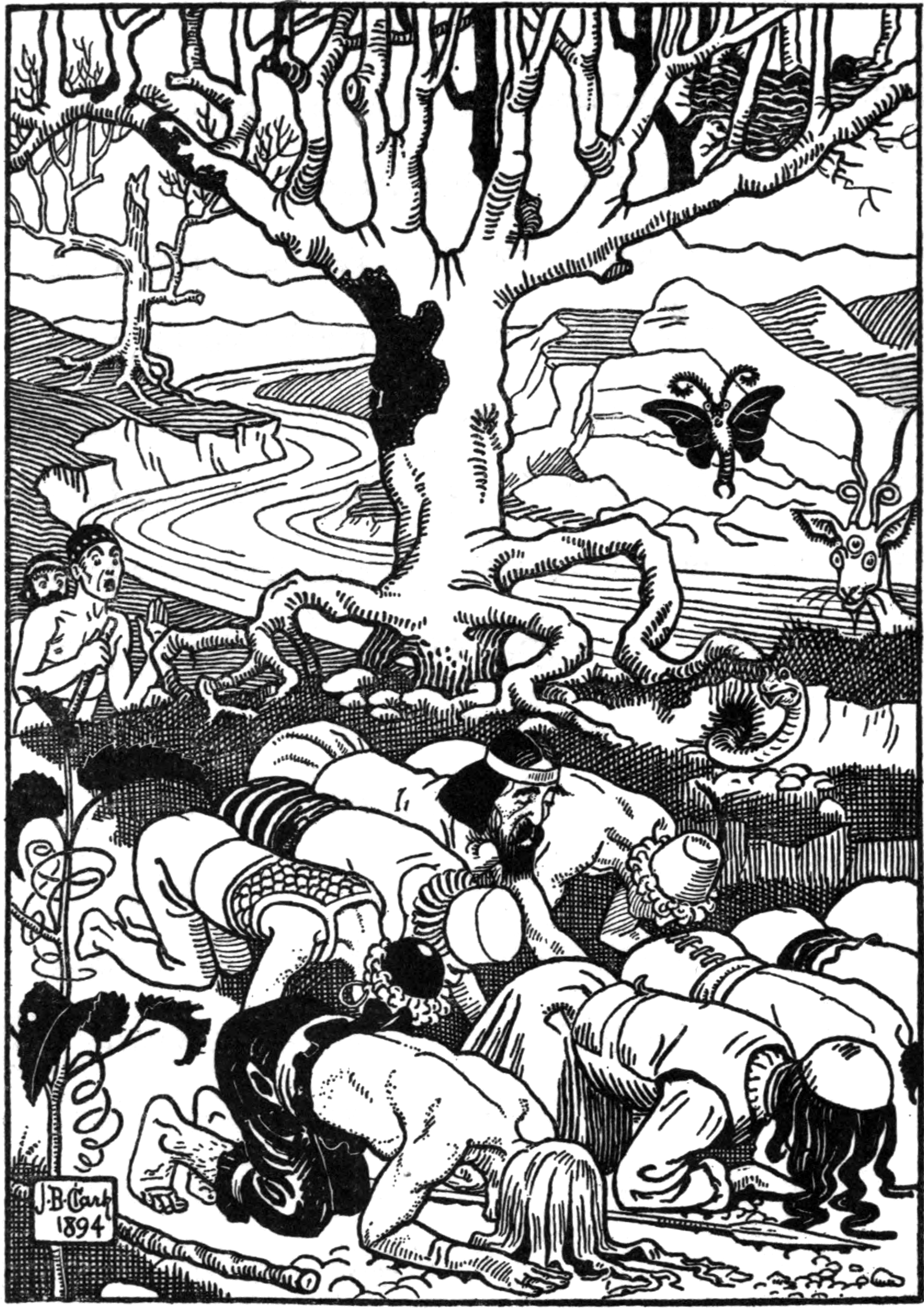
From True History

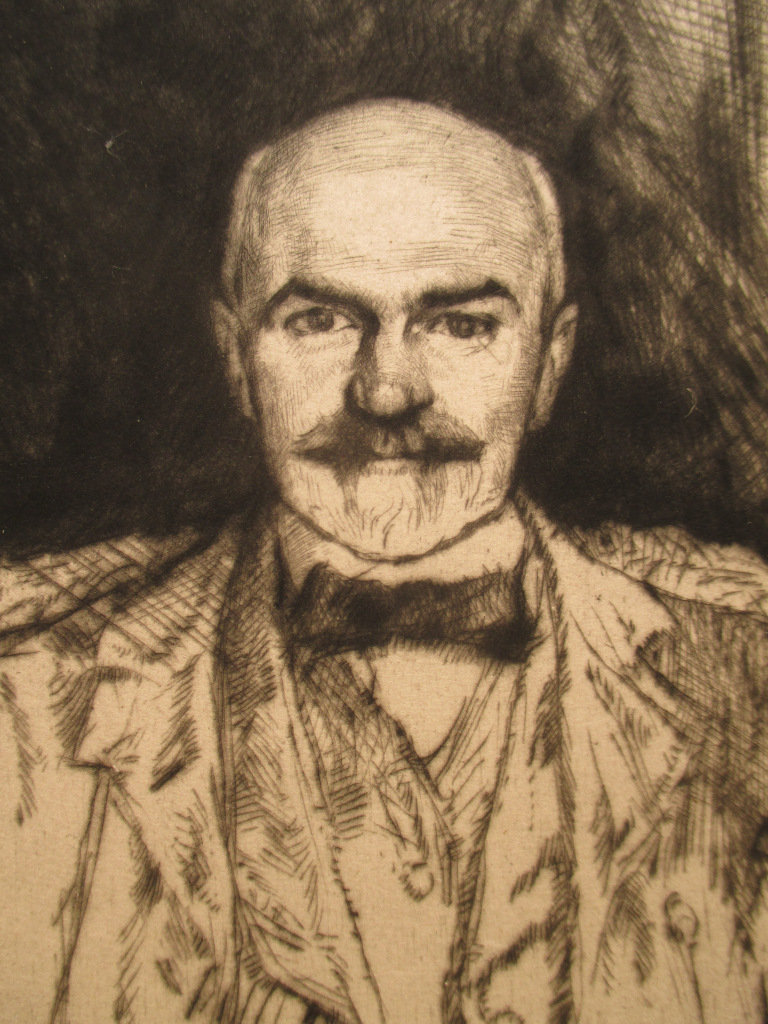
Clark by Strang, c. 1915

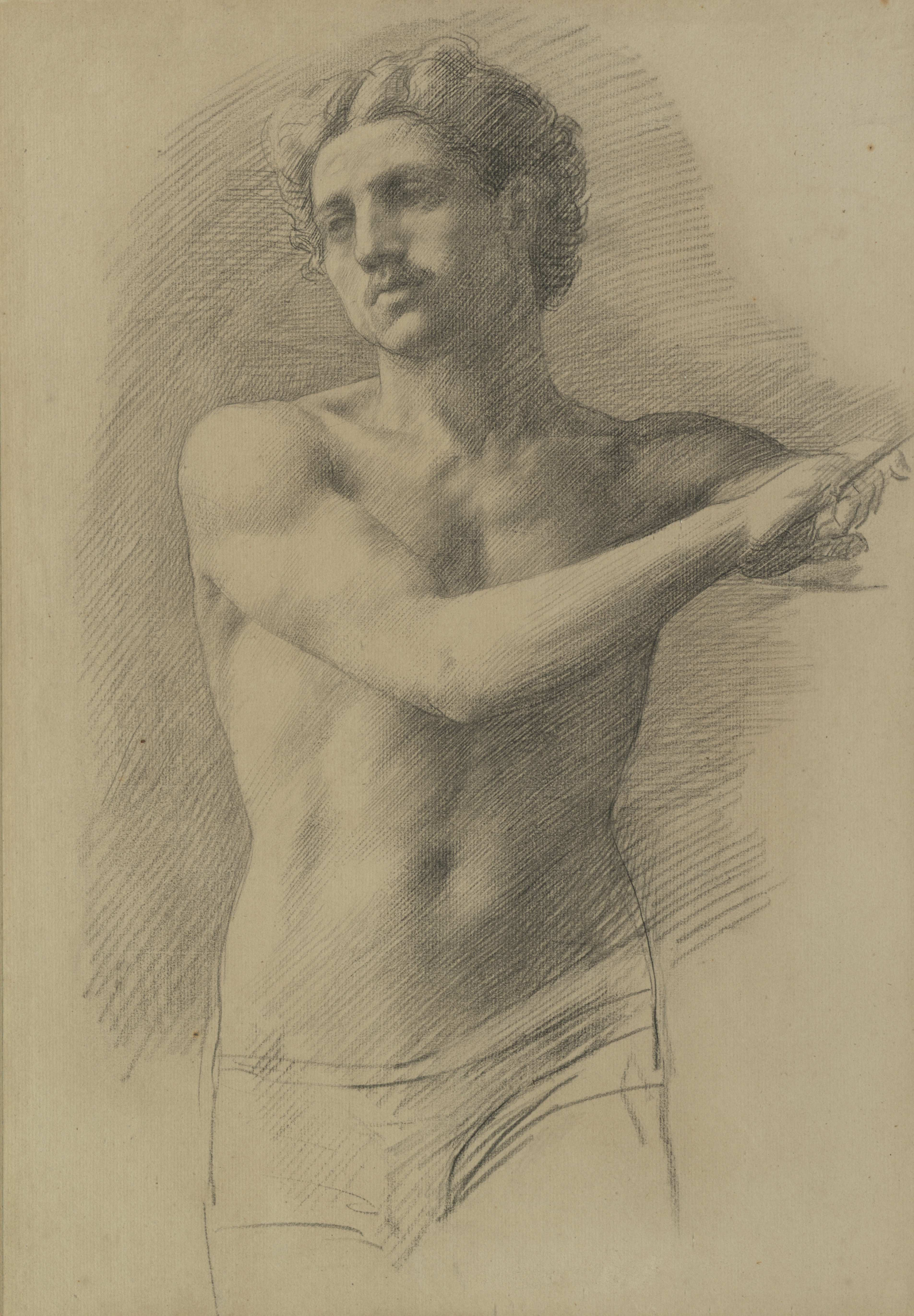
Study of a Male Figure, Aberdeen Archives, Gallery & Museums Collection

== Works illustrated ==
- "Ye Baron's Daughter and Ye Squire of Low Degree", a ballad illustrated by J. B. Clark and Mason Jackson, Illustrated London News Christmas number, December 1890
- Lucian's True History, Greek text with illustrations by William Strang, J. B. Clark, and Aubrey Beardsley (limited edition, privately printed by Lawrence and Bullen, 1894)
  - Lucian's True History, translated by Francis Hickes, with introduction by Charles Whibley, illustrations by William Strang, J. B. Clark, and Aubrey Beardsley (London: A. H. Bullen, 1902)
- The Surprising Adventures of Baron Munchausen, illustrated by William Strang and J. B. Clark (London: Lawrence and Bullen, 1895)
- Sindbad the Sailor and Alibaba and the Forty Thieves, illustrated by William Strang and J. B. Clark (New York: Charles Scribner's Sons, 1895; London: Lawrence and Bullen, 1896)
