= Kern =

Kern or KERN may refer to:

== People ==
- Kern (surname), includes a list of people with the name
- Kern (soldier), a light infantry unit in Medieval Irish armies

== Places ==
- Kern, Alaska, a ghost town in Alaska
- Kern, Austria, see Sankt Marienkirchen am Hausruck
- Kern, California, a former unincorporated community in Kern County, California
- Kern County, California, a county in the southern Central Valley of the U.S. state of California
- Kern River, California, a river which drains an area of the southern Sierra Nevada mountains
- Kern, Missouri, an unincorporated community
- Boron, California or Kern, California, a census-designated place (CDP) in Kern County, California, United States

== Other uses ==
- Kern (typography), the process of adjusting the spacing between characters in a proportional font
- Kern AG, a German-based international language service company
- Kern & Co., a former Swiss manufacturer of surveying and drawing instruments
- KERN, an American radio station
- Cell (music), melodic kernels, called Kern in German music theory

== See also ==
- Cern (disambiguation)
- Kerne (disambiguation)
- Kernel (disambiguation)
- Kerner (disambiguation)
- Kerns (disambiguation)
- Kirn (disambiguation)
- Saoud Qern (born 1987) Saudi soccer player
