= Kern (surname) =

Kern is a German surname of several possible origins. Notable people with the surname include:

- Adele Kern (1901–1980), German soprano opera and operetta singer
- Anna Petrovna Kern (1800–1873), Pushkin's mistress
- András Kern (born 1948), Hungarian actor
- Brad Kern, American television producer
- Brett Kern, American football punter
- Christian Kern, Austrian politician
- David J. Kern, American naval officer
- Dorothee Kern (born 1966), German-American biochemist
- Doug Kern (born 1963), American sailor
- Edward Kern (1822–1863), American cartographer and artist
- Hal C. Kern (1894–1985), American film editor
- Hermann Armin von Kern (1838–1912), Austrian painter
- Jamie Kern (born 1977), American television personality
- Jerome Kern (1885–1945), American composer
- Jerome H. Kern (1937–2024), American lawyer, investment banker, consultant, and philanthropist
- Jim Kern (born 1949), American baseball player
- Joey Kern (born 1976), American actor
- Johan Hendrik Caspar Kern (1833–1917), aka H. Kern, Dutch linguist and Anglo-Indian educator
- Johannes Hendrikus Kern (1903–1974), Dutch botanist
- John W. Kern (1849–1917), American politician
- Karl-Hans Kern (1932–2014), German politician
- Kevin Kern (musician) (born 1958), American musician
- Kevin Kern (actor), Broadway actor
- Lisa Kern (born 1983), German politician
- Marc Kern (ice hockey) (born 1989), Swiss ice hockey player
- Mark Kern, former video game executive
- Nathaniel Kern, American oil industry consultant
- Olga Kern (born 1975), Russian classical pianist
- Otto Kern (1863–1942), German linguist
- Patricia Kern (1927–2015), British mezzo-soprano and voice teacher
- Paul Kern (insomniac), Hungarian who was supposedly unable to sleep
- Paul J. Kern (born 1945), American army officer and businessman
- Peter E. Kern (1860–1937), American entrepreneur
- Ralph Kern (born 1967), German artistic gymnast
- Richard Kern (born 1954), American photographer and filmmaker
- Robert Henry Kern, American engineer and entrepreneur
- Ruth Kern (1914–2002), American lawyer
- Robert J. Kern (1885–1972), American film editor
- Sally Kern (born 1946), Oklahoma state legislator
- Sean Kern (born 1978), American water polo player
- Timm Kern (born 1972), German politician
- Werner Kern (football manager) (born 1946), German football coach
- Yermolay Kern (1773–1841) Russian general of the Napoleonic Wars

== Fictional characters ==
- Jimbo Kern, a character on South Park

== See also ==
- Kerns (surname)
