= Cern (disambiguation) =

CERN, or Conseil Européen pour la Recherche Nucléaire, is a European particle physics research center.

Cern or CERN may also refer to:

- CERN Open Hardware Licence, an open-source hardware licence
- 15332 CERN, an asteroid
- CERN httpd, an early web server
- Cerner, an American health information technology company (Nasdaq code: CERN)
- Rugby Club CERN (RC Cern), a rugby team
- The CERN Foundation (Collaborative Ependymoma Research Network), a nonprofit cancer foundation
- Churches European Rural Network, a network of individuals and representatives of churches in Europe
- Cern, the Romanian name of the medieval fortress of Chern located in modern Chernivtsi, Ukraine

== See also ==
- Kern (disambiguation)
- Sern (disambiguation)
- Cerne (disambiguation)
