= Cerne =

Cerne may refer to:

== People ==
- Joe Cerne (born 1942), American football player
- Rudi Cerne (born 1958), German figure skater and TV presenter
- Teja Černe (born 1984), Slovenian sailor

== Places ==
Czech Republic

- Černé Voděrady, Czech Republic; a village
- Černé Budy, Czech Republic; (Czech: Černé Shelter), a town
- Újezd u Černé Hory, Czech Republic; (Czech: Černé Hory District), a village
- Černé jezero, Czech Republic; (Czech: Černé Lake), a lake

United Kingdom

- Nether Cerne, a village in Dorset, England, UK
- Cerne Abbas, a village in Dorset, England, UK
  - Cerne Abbey, former abbey in the village
  - Cerne Abbas Giant, a geoglyph
- Up Cerne, a village in Dorset, England, UK
- Lingfield Cernes (SSSI) the Cernes of Lingfield, Surrey, England, UK
- River Cerne, a river in Dorset, England, UK; with etymology

Ireland

- Cerne, the site of Athcarne Castle in Meath, Ireland

== Other uses ==
- Oraesia cerne (O. cerne), a species of moth
- Cerne Skalicke, a variety of grape
- Book of Cerne, an Old English prayerbook

== See also ==
- Cerne, Totcombe and Modbury Hundred, Dorset, England, UK
- Draycot Cerne, a village in Wiltshire, England, UK
- Cern (disambiguation)
- Sern (disambiguation)
- Kerne (disambiguation)
