= Kirn (disambiguation) =

Kirn is a town in Rhineland-Palatinate, Germany.

Kirn may also refer to:

== Settlements ==
- Kirn, Argyll, a village on the Cowal peninsula, Scotland

== Other uses ==
- Kirn (surname)
- KIRN, a radio station in Los Angeles
- Kirn dolly or kirn baby, Scots for a corn dolly

== See also ==
- Kirner Land, a verbandsgemeinde ("collective municipality") located around Kirn, Germany
- Kern (disambiguation)
