= Kerns =

Kerns may refer to:

- Plural of Kern
- Kerns (surname)
- Kerns, Ontario, Canada
- Kerns, Portland, Oregon, United States
- Kerns, Switzerland, a village and municipality

== See also ==
- Kernstown, Virginia, United States
  - Battle of Kernstown (disambiguation)
- Kern (disambiguation)
