= Robert Connor Dawes Foundation =

Australian not-for-profit organisation

- Founded: June 2013
- Founders: Liz and Scott Dawes
- Type: NGO
- Registration no.: ABN 49126106682
- Purpose: pediatric brain research and care
- Location: Sandringham, Victoria, Australia
- Region served: Australia and US
- Volunteers: 250
- Website: www.rcdfoundation.org
- Formerly called: Robert Connor Dawes Fund

The Robert Connor Dawes Foundation is an Australian not-for-profit organisation that facilitates funding in brain research, care and development in Australia and the United States. The foundation was created in June 2013 by Liz Dawes and Scott Dawes in memory of their son Robert Connor Dawes who died from a brain tumour in April 2013 at 18 years of age. As of July 31, 2015, they changed their name from Robert Connor Dawes Fund to Robert Connor Dawes Foundation.

== Overview ==
Funds raised go towards research to further understand and more completely treat brain tumours, including earlier detection, surgery and post-surgery treatments at the Royal Children’s Hospital, the Murdoch Children's Research Institute, the Peter MacCallum Cancer Centre, Children's Cancer Institute of Australia and the Monash Medical Centre. The foundation also supports the work of The CERN Foundation. The main source of fundraising is the annual Connor's Run which has raised $2.7 million since 2013 and has become the largest event for paediatric brain cancer in Australia. The event was recognised by the Bayside City Council in 2014 as the Best Community Event of the Year. Their main event in the United States is Connor's Erg Challenge. In 2014, the foundation launched Victoria's first Brain Week to raise awareness of brain cancer and source research funding, which is now in its third year.

== Ambassadors ==
Lisa McCune, James Tomkins, Olivia Wells, Tamsyn Lewis, Dave Hughes, Feliks Zemdegs, Sean McMahon and Charlie Carrington are ambassadors.

== Events ==
=== Connor's Run ===
Connor's Run, held in September is the foundation's largest event. The 2019 event was the biggest to date, with over 5000 participants, and raising over $1.2 million. In seven years, the event has raised $4.3 million to support research into paediatric brain cancer.

== RCD Foundation initiatives ==
=== AIM Brain Project ===
In 2017 the Federal Government, along with the Australian and New Zealand Children’s Haematology/Oncology Group made the announcement that they would be co-funding the AIM Brain Project along with the Robert Connor Dawes Foundation over four years. The project is an Australian-first Robert Connor Dawes Foundation initiative that provides access to world-leading research technology, led by Dr Stefan Pfister at the German Cancer Research Centre, and will help doctors better understand and classify individual brain tumours. With a clearer understanding of each tumour, specialists can create better, personalised treatments not just based on tumour type, but on its actual molecular build. In January 2019, Carrie Bickmore's charity, Carrie's Beanies 4 Brain Cancer (CB4BC) announced that they would contribute more than $500,000 to the cause.
