= Hafed Al-Ghwell =

Libyan-American executive

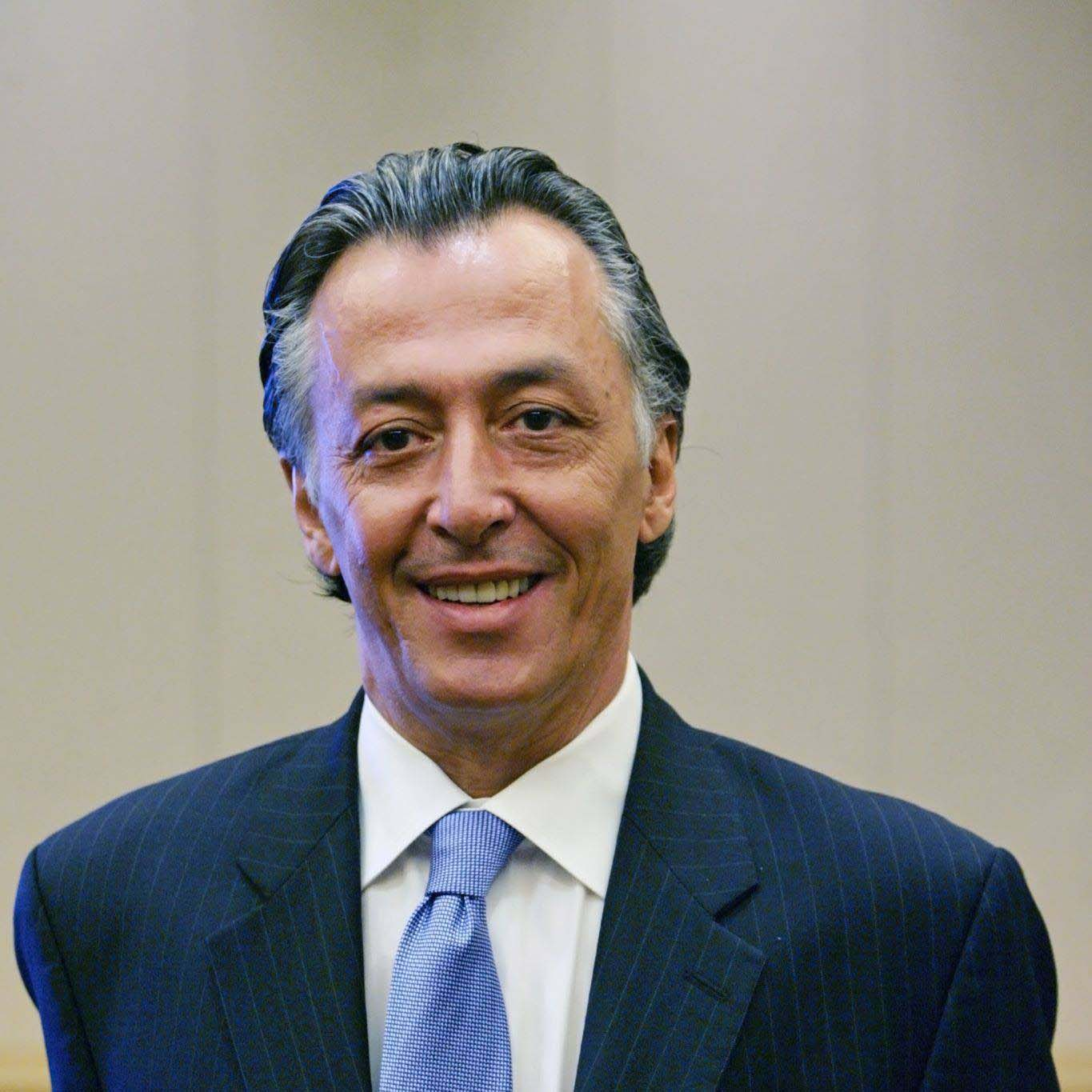
- Born: 1 October 1962 (age 64); Tripoli, Libya
- Education: George Washington University; Stanford University; Harvard University
- Employers: International Monetary Fund (IMF); Foreign Reports, Inc.; World Bank Group; Atlantic Council - Rafik Hariri Center for the Middle East; Maxwell Stamp, Inc.; Oxford Analytica; NH & Associates; National Council on US-Libyan Relations
- Website: www.hafedalghwell.com

Hafed al-Ghwell — ARABIC : حافظ الغويل — is a non-resident Senior Fellow at the Foreign Policy Institute (FPI) of the Paul H. Nitze School of Advanced International Studies (SAIS) at Johns Hopkins University and a senior advisor at Maxwell Stamp, an international economics advisory and consultancy firm, where he specializes in the Middle East political, economic and social issues. He also heads their global strategic communications practice.

He is also a senior advisor at Oxford Analytica, the global risk consultancy firm and a Columnist for Arab News

From January 2015 until this year, Hafed was a Senior Nonresident Fellow at the Atlantic Council's Rafik Hariri Center for the Middle East in Washington, D.C.

Hafed Al-Ghwell also serves as a member of the board of directors of the National Council on US–Libya Relations, as well as a member of the Board of Directors of the consulting firm NH & Associates.

Additionally, Hafed Al-Ghwell is a columnist for Gulf News and Al Jazeera International and a veteran commentator on the political economies of the Middle East and North Africa. His comments and analyses are published widely in international media, including Reuters, ABC News, BBC, DW-TV, Al-Jazeera English, NPR, PBS Frontline, NewsHour, and Radio France Internationale (RFI).

He is also a frequent commentator on various Arabic-only news channels, e.g. Al Arabiya TV, Alaraby TV and Al Hurra TV, and many others.

His opinions and comments are also featured in print publications like the Financial Times, The Wall Street Journal, VOA News, The Washington Times, UPI, Newsweek, The Washington Diplomat, The National, Gulf News, among many others.

His area of expertise include the society, politics and the economies of the MENA region, geopolitics, international relations, especially US-Middle East Relations, with special emphasis on Libya's internal and external affairs. He is often described in the news media as Middle East & North Africa analyst, but prior to that, he was known for his activism against the now deposed regime of Muammar Gaddafi.

== Career ==
Hafed Al-Ghwell served as a permanent Staff Member of the World Bank Group for 16 years, in various positions, e.g. as an Advisor to the Dean of the Board of Executive Directors of the World Bank Group until the end of 2015 after taking an early retirement.

Between 2009 and 2012, he also served as a Strategy and Communications Advisor in the Office of the Vice President for Middle East and North Africa and as well as the Program Coordinator in the Office of the Vice President of UN and External Affairs, also at the World Bank.

He was also a Director of External Affairs and Communications at the Dubai School of Government, and part of its Senior Management Team (SMT), from 2007 to 2009. He joined the Dubai School of Government, a partnership with the Harvard University's John F. Kennedy School of Government for the Arab World, now renamed as Mohammed Bin Rashid School of Government, on a secondment from his position as the Head of the Global Network of Public Diplomacy, Information, and Communication Centers for the World Bank.

Prior to that, Hafed served as a Principal Associate at Foreign Reports Inc., a Washington, D.C.-based management-consulting firm that publishes and distributes intelligence reports and analyses on political developments in the Middle East oil industry and key issues facing energy markets around the world. He later joined the World Bank in 1999.

In the late 80's, upon graduation from the George Washington University, Hafed also served as a Junior Economist at the International Monetary Fund (IMF), focusing on monetary and exchange rate policy of the OPEC countries in the Middle East and North Africa.

== Education ==
Hafed holds a B.A. in Economics from the George Washington University, and completed multiple postgraduate programs in Philosophy of Religion also at GWU.

He also holds a Postgraduate Executive Certificate from Harvard University's John F. Kennedy School of Government in leadership and public policy, and a Postgraduate Executive Certificate from Stanford University in Strategic Communications, Media and Publishing.

Hafed has also completed numerous executive training programs of the World Bank Group in Management, Strategy, Economic Development, Public Policy and Administration.

== Bibliography ==
- Al Jazeera International, www.aljazeera.com
- Atlantic Council, www.atlanticcouncil.org
- Financial Times, www.ft.com
- Gulf News, www.gulfnews.com
- Samuels D., How Libya Blew Billions and Its Best Chance at Democracy, www.bloomberg.com, 2014 [1]
- Sorenson D.S., An Introduction to the Modern Middle East: History, Religion, Political Economy, Politics, Westview Press Inc, 2014
- The Wall Street Journal, www.wsj.com
- World Bank Group Directory, World Bank Publications 2003
- World Development Indicators: 2003, World Bank Publications 2003
