= Liebfraumilch =

Type of German white wine

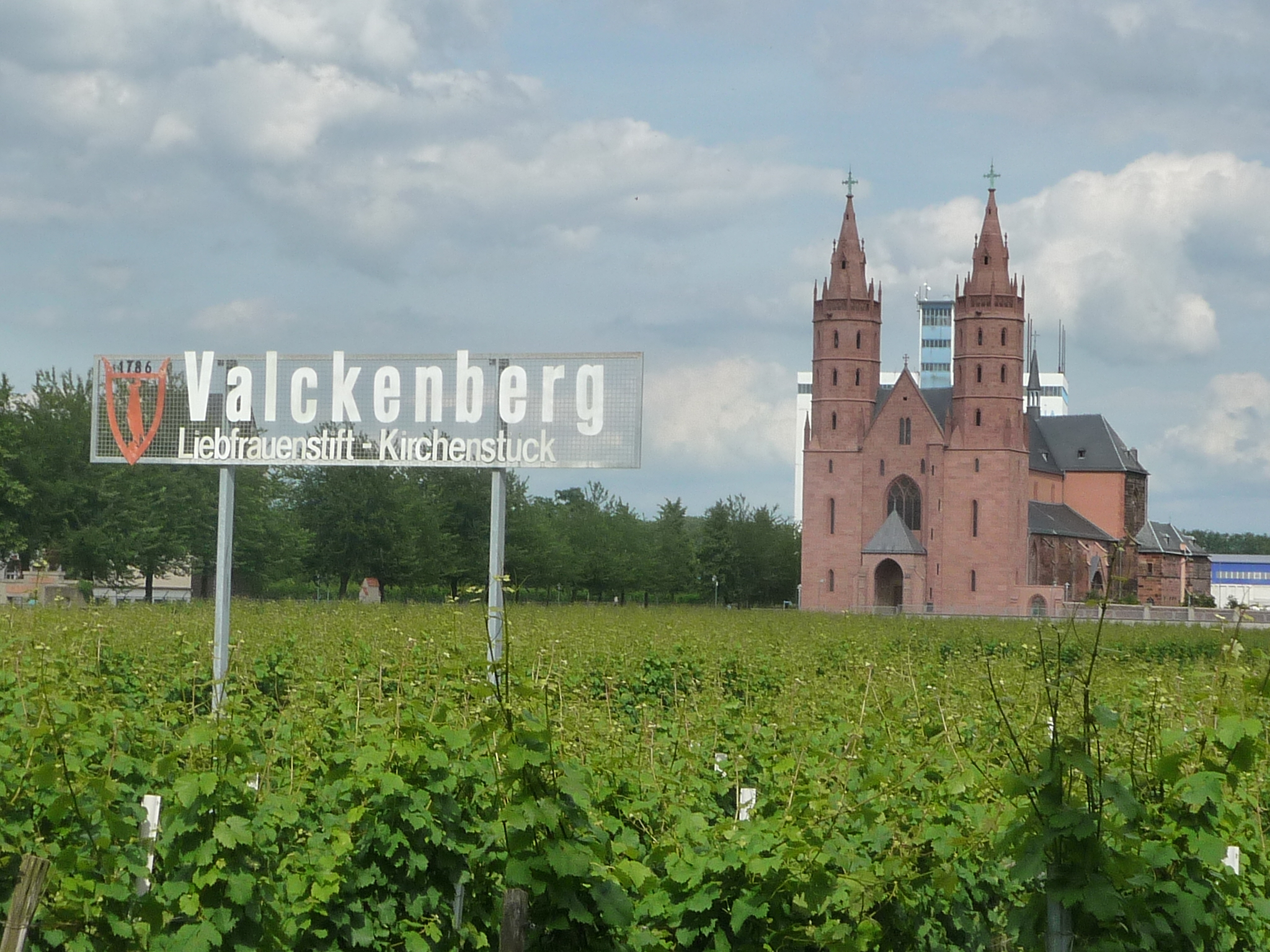
Liebfrauenkirche in Worms with surrounding grapevines

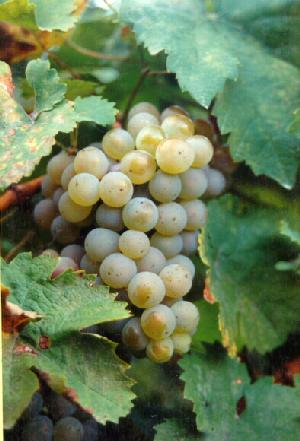
Müller-Thurgau is often used in the production of Liebfraumilch.

Liebfraumilch or Liebfrauenmilch (German: [liːpˈfʁaʊ̯ənˌmɪlç], German for 'Our Lady's Milk', in reference to the Virgin Mary) is a style of semi-sweet white German wine which may be produced, mostly for export, in the regions Rheinhessen, Palatinate, Rheingau, and Nahe. The original German spelling of the word is Liebfrauenmilch, given to the wine produced from the vineyards of the Liebfrauenkirche or "Church of Our Lady" in the Rhineland-Palatinate city of Worms since the eighteenth century. The spelling Liebfraumilch is more common on labels of exported wine.

== Classification ==
Back in the eighteenth century, it was said that the term "Liebfraumilch" should only be used if the grapes grew in the area “as far as the tower of the Liebfrauenkirche casts its shadow” but this rule was not anchored in law. This “genuine” Liebfraumilch is available as “Wormser Liebfrauenstift-Kirchenstück” from the winegrowers Gutzler, Schembs, Spohr and Valckenberg.

The genuine Wormser Liebfrauenmilch and today's “Wormser Liebfrauenstift-Kirchenstück” have a smoky taste that originates from the wooden house debris from the Nine Years' War (1688-1697). In those days, the debris from the town was deposited around the Liebfrauenkirche and vineyards were planted on it.

The generic label Liebfraumilch is typically used to market vintages from anywhere in most of the major wine growing areas of Germany, the notable exception being Mosel. Wine with very similar characteristics but made from higher quality grapes can be labeled as Spätlese or Auslese. In the US and the UK, perhaps the best known example has been Blue Nun, which no longer uses the Liebfraumilch designation.

The term Liebfraumilch is associated with low quality wine, and, consequently, the German wine classification requires it only to be at the Qualitätswein bestimmter Anbaugebiete (QbA) level—the third rank out of ten. However, it must also be from Rheinhessen, Pfalz, Nahe, or Rheingau, and the grapes must be at least 70% Riesling, Silvaner, Müller-Thurgau or Kerner and it must have 18–40 grams per litre (0.00065–0.00145 lb/cu in) residual sugar.

German wine is classified roughly into ten categories: Tafelwein (dining wine), Landwein, QbA (as mentioned above), followed by QbP (with predicate), followed by Kabinett, Spätlese (late harvest), Auslese (special selection), Beerenauslese (lit. berry selection), and Trockenbeerenauslese (dry berry selection). Somewhat apart sits the Eiswein (ice wine), which is generally understood to be at least on par with the Beerenauslese, but helped with both Botryitis (as is the Beerenauslese) in conjunction with natural cryo extraction (icewine grapes have to be processed at -7 °C). Overall, these quality levels are following extract per litre measures (density levels) as these are indicative of sugar levels. Blue Nun, as a result, sits at level 1 out of 8 and, despite its international success, is rarely considered in the domestic market.

== In popular culture ==
When a rack of wine topples over in the 1932 Hollywood film Downstairs, the wine cellar caretaker Otto (Otto Hoffman) laments a broken bottle of Liebfrauenmilch, very likely to be a subtle joke.

In The Unpleasantness at the Bellona Club, in the chapter "The Curse of Scotland", Lord Peter has a bottle of Liebfraumilch with his lunch.

In the book Desert Solitaire, by Edward Abbey, the author stops at a liquor store to purchase a bottle of liebfraumilch on his way to Mount Tukuhnikivatz.

In the episode of Only Fools and Horses, "Dates", Del Boy mentions to the matchmaker that he would like a "refined" woman that can tell the difference between "Liebfraumilch and a can of Tizer".

In the video game Castle Wolfenstein, by Muse Software, liebfraumilch can be found by unlocking some chests.

"...Soon she did return, in her hand was a bottle of liebfraumilch..." in the 1970 live in Bremen video version of "Spill the Wine" by Eric Burdon and War (Note that various words throughout the live video version of the song differ from the original recorded version).

In the book Confessions of Felix Krull by Thomas Mann, the priest of the main character which described as a man who loves life, drinks Liebfraumilch with a portion of Fines Herbs omelet for breakfast.

Roy Orbison had a "one bottle Black-Label Liebfrauenmilch" on his tour rider in the 1980s.
