= Kerner (surname) =

Kerner is an occupational surname of German and Jewish (Ashkenazic) origin. There are various possible derivations, including as a name for a farmer or a nickname for a small person, from a Middle High German kerne ("kernel seed pip"); German Kern or Yiddish kern (grain), among others. Middle English kerner is a variant of cherner ("churner; one who churns butter"). It may also derive from "carter" or "carrier", from the German word kerenere. The name was found in Bavaria, Germany, in the medieval period.

People with the surname include:

== Literature ==
- Charlotte Kerner (born 1950), biographer and science-fiction writer
- Elizabeth Kerner (born 1958), fantasy author
- Justinus Kerner (1786–1862), a German lyric poet of the Swabian school

== Politics ==
- Johann Georg Kerner (1770–1812), political journalist, critical chronicler of the French revolution, brother of Justinus Kerner
- Otto Kerner, Jr. (1908–1976), Illinois Governor and judge on the United States Court of Appeals for the Seventh Circuit
- Otto Kerner, Sr. (1884–1952), an Illinois Attorney General and judge on the United States Court of Appeals for the Seventh Circuit

== Entertainment and media ==
- Nena (Gabriele Susanne Kerner; born 1960), German singer who became famous with the New German Wave songs "Nur geträumt" and "99 Luftballons"
- Jordan Kerner, film producer
- Johannes B. Kerner, (born 1964), German television broadcaster

== Sports ==
- Jonathan Kerner (born 1974), American basketball player
- Marlon Kerner (born 1973), American football player

== Science and mathematics ==
- Boris Kerner, (born 1947), German physicist
- Anton Kerner von Marilaun (1831–1898), Austrian botanist

== Other fields ==
- Ian Kerner, American sex counselor
