= Sern =

Sern may refer to:

- SERN (single expansion ramp nozzle), a type of rocket nozzle
- Lou Sern, an alias for American singer Tom Hooker
- "Sern.", the standard botanical abbreviation for botanist Rutger Sernander
- SERN, a fictional organization in the videogame Steins;Gate
- a fictional sector of space from Star Wars
- a raw meat dish in Chinese cuisine

== See also ==
- Cerne (disambiguation)
- Cern (disambiguation)
