= Kerne =

Kerne may refer to:

- Kerne or Kernev, Breton names for the historic region of Cornouaille, in Brittany, France
- Radio Kerne, a radio station in Brittany broadcasting in Breton
- Kerne Bridge, Herefordshire, England, UK; a bridge
- Kerne, a type of traditional Irish soldiery, see Rapparee
- Kerne, an African settlement founded by Carthaginian explorer Hanno the Navigator

== See also ==
- Hennadiy Kernes (1959–2020) Ukrainian politician
- Cerne (disambiguation)
- Kern (disambiguation)
