= Conference of European Churches =

Church organization in europe

The Conference of European Churches (CEC) was founded in 1959 to promote reconciliation, dialogue and friendship between the churches of Europe at a time of growing Cold War political tensions and divisions.

In its commitment to Europe as a whole the Conference seeks to help the European churches to renew their spiritual life, to strengthen their common witness and service and to promote the unity of the Church and peace in the world.

The CEC is a fellowship of some 114 Orthodox, Protestant, Anglican, and Old Catholic Churches from all countries of Europe, plus 40 National Council of Churches and Organisations in Partnership. The CEC was founded in 1959 and has its office in Brussels.

== Assemblies ==
CEC assemblies take place once every five years. The 4th CEC assembly (1964) had to be held on a ship on the Baltic Sea owing to the difficulties of obtaining visas for delegates from eastern European countries.

=== Past assemblies ===
- I. 1959 Nyborg, Denmark: "European Christianity in Today’s Secularised World"
- II. 1960 Nyborg, Denmark: "The Service of the Church in a Changing World"
- III. 1962 Nyborg, Denmark: "The Church in Europe and the Crisis of Modern Man"
- IV. 1964 Baltic Sea, on board the M.V. Bornholm: "Living Together as Continents and Generations"
- V. 1967 Pörtschach, Austria: "To Serve and Reconcile: the Task of the European Churches Today"
- VI. 1971 Nyborg, Denmark: "Servants of God, Servants of Men"
- VII. 1974 Engelberg, Switzerland: "Act on the Message - Unity in Christ and Peace in the World"
- VIII. 1979 Chania, Crete, Greece: "Alive to the World in the Power of the Holy Spirit"
- IX. 1986 Stirling, Scotland: "Glory to God and Peace on Earth"
- X. 1992 Prague, then Czechoslovakia (now in Czech Republic): "God Unites - in Christ a New Creation"
- XI. 1997 Graz, Austria: "Reconciliation, Gift of God and Source of New Life"
- XII. 2003 Trondheim, Norway: Jesus Christ Heals and Reconciles: Our Witness in Europe"
- XIII. 2009 Lyon, France: Called to One Hope in Christ
- XIV. 2013 Budapest, Hungary:“And now what are you waiting for?” CEC and its Mission in a Changing Europe
- XV. 2018 Novi Sad, Serbia:"You shall be my witnesses" Witness, Justice, Hospitality
- XVI. 2023 Tallinn, Estonia:"Under God's blessing: shaping the future"

== Governance ==
Until 2013, the CEC was governed by an annual Central Committee meeting between assemblies. The 12th Assembly of the Conference of European Churches (Trondheim, 2003) elected the 40-member Committee. This Committee, according to the CEC Constitution, was "empowered to conduct the business of the Conference when the Assembly is not meeting". At the 14th CEC Assembly (Budapest 2013) the Central Committee was replaced by a 20-member Governing Board. The Governing Board meets twice annually to oversee the implementation of the decisions of the Assembly. (art. 6.1)

The President of the CEC (from 2009 to 2013) was H.E. Metropolitan Emmanuel of France. He was succeeded in 2013 by Christopher Hill, a retired Church of England bishop (formerly Bishop of Guildford. On 4 June 2018, Rev. Christian Krieger, from the Reformed Church in Alsace and Lorraine was elected President, in Novi Sad, Serbia. Since 19 June 2023, H.E. Archbishop Nikitas of Thyateira and Great Britain is the President of the CEC.

The longstanding membership status of the Associated Organisations from all strands of the ecumenical movement was cancelled after a controversial debate by the 14th CEC Assembly in a second vote during a closed session requested by the Protestant Church in Germany, one of the main contributors to the CEC budget. The organisations excluded were offered a non-voting status of organisations in partnership like national councils of churches in the CEC. It is affiliated with the World Council of Churches (WCC).

== Secretariat ==
The offices of the Conference of European Churches are (since 2014) based in Brussels, Belgium - formerly the offices used by the Church and Society Commission of the CEC. The CEC General Secretariat and the (former) Churches in Dialogue Commission were previously located in the Ecumenical Centre, Geneva, Switzerland - which remains also the headquarters building of the World Council of Churches.

Rev. Frank-Dieter Fischbach was appointed by the Governing Board of CEC on 14 March 2024 as the new General Secretary, starting his role on 1 July 2024. Dr Jørgen Skov Sørensen was General Secretary of the Conference of European Churches until December 2023.

General Secretary Very Revd Protopresbyter Heikki Theodoros Huttunen from the Orthodox Church of Finland succeeded Rev. Dr Guy Liagre, formerly President of the United Protestant Church in Belgium and Rev. Prof. Dr Viorel Ionita who served as Interim General Secretary from 2010. The former General Secretary (2005-2010) was the Venerable Colin Williams, formerly Archdeacon of Lancaster in the Church of England; he succeeded the Rev. Dr Keith Clements.

== Former Commissions ==
By 2014 the two former Commissions of the CEC were fully integrated into the core work of the CEC.

=== Church and Society Commission ===
In 1999 the European Ecumenical Commission on Church and Society (EECCS) merged with the CEC, becoming the CEC's Church and Society Commission. The Church and Society Commission's secretariat was located in offices in Brussels, Belgium and Strasbourg, France. The Director of the Church and Society Commission from 2002 until 2013 was the Rev. Rüdiger Noll. Recent annual plenary meetings of the Church and Society Commission have been held in El Escorial, Spain (2003), Wavre, Belgium (2004), Dunblane, Scotland (2005), Sigtuna, Sweden (2006), Etchmiadzin, Armenia (2007), Prague, Czech Republic (2008) and Nyborg, Denmark (2009). Following the 14th CEC Assembly in Budapest in 2013 the programmes of the Church and Society Commission were integrated fully into the work of the CEC, a move completed in 2014.

=== Churches in Dialogue Commission ===
Based in Geneva, the staff member in charge was until July 2012, Rev. Professor Father Viorel Ionita, of the Romanian Orthodox Church. The former General Secretary of CEC, Rev. Dr Guy Liagre succeeded him from 2012. From 2013 the work of the Churches in Dialogue Commission has been fully integrated in the work on ecumenical relations led by the CEC General Secretary.

== Relations with the Roman Catholic Church ==
The largest Christian body, the Roman Catholic Church, is not a member of the CEC for the same reasons that it abstains from officially participating in the World Council of Churches, which is that such organizations do not recognize any kind of Roman Catholic primacy in the governance of the universal Church.

The Third European Ecumenical Assembly (co-organised by the CEC and the CCEE) was held in Sibiu, Romania, 4–9 September 2007.

== See also ==
- Churches European Rural Network
- World Council of Churches
