= Blue Nun =

German wine brand

- Type: Wine
- Manufacturer: F.W. Langguth Erben GmbH & Co. KG,v
- Origin: Germany, Mosel-Saar-Ruwer
- Introduced: 1923
- Alcohol by volume: 10%
- Proof (US): 20°
- Colour: White wine
- Flavour: Fresh, crisp & fruity
- Ingredients: Grapes
- Website: bluenun.wine

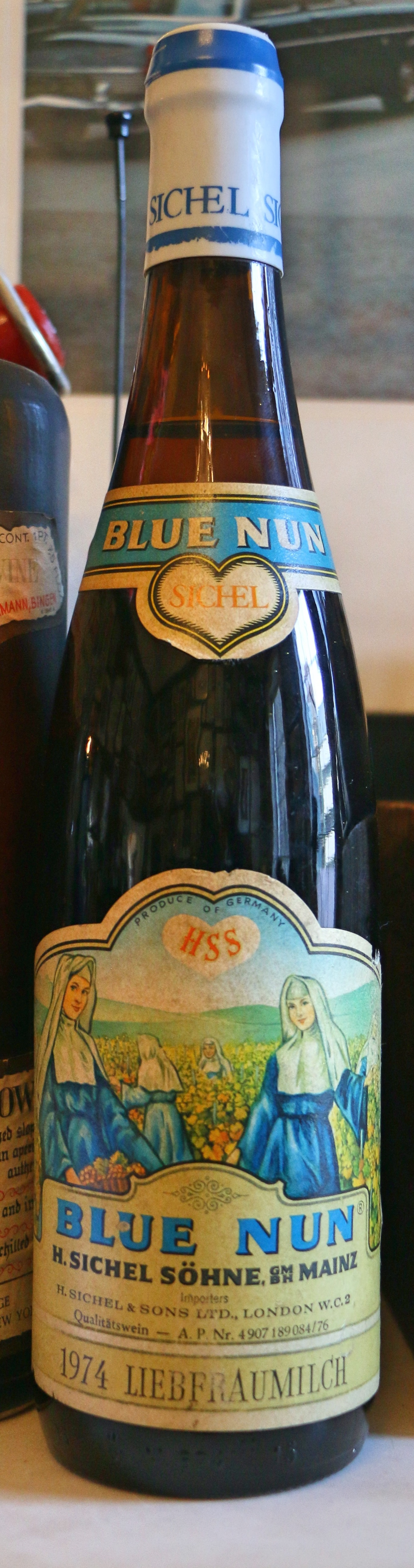
A bottle of Blue Nun

Blue Nun is a German wine brand launched by the Mainz-based company H. Sichel Söhne in 1923 with the 1921 vintage, and which between the 1950s and 1980s was a very popular international brand. For most of its existence, Blue Nun was a single German wine, which until the late 1990s was classified as a Liebfraumilch, but the name is now used for a whole range of wines of various origins. When it was created, the label was designed as a consumer-friendly alternative to the innumerable German wine labels with Gothic script and long, complicated names. With the creation of its UK office in 1927, Sichel targeted the export market. Beginning in the 1950s, Blue Nun was advertised as a wine that could be drunk throughout an entire meal, thereby eliminating the often intimidating problem of wine and food pairing. Blue Nun can be said to have been the first wine to have been produced and effectively marketed with an international mass market in mind.

After World War II, the brand became widely popular in the United Kingdom and the United States, selling for the same price as a second growth red Bordeaux wine. At its peak of popularity in 1984–1985, annual sales in the U.S. were 1.25 million cases, with another 750,000 cases sold in other markets.

During the 1970s in the U.S., a series of radio adverts promoting the wine were produced, featuring comedy duo Stiller and Meara. Their ads were so effective, they reportedly boosted sales by 500%.

From the late 1980s, easy-drinking, semi-sweet German wines began to decline in popularity. Consequently, the brand's popularity declined, and the wine began to be perceived as tacky and dated. This change was reflected in Blue Nun being the drink of choice of Alan Partridge, a fictional, over-the-hill British television and radio presenter. However, sales increased after Blue Nun was purchased by the Mosel-based German family firm Langguth, which bought the previous owners Sichel in 1996. They repositioned the brand, reclassifying it from a Liebfraumilch to a regular Qualitätswein bestimmter Anbaugebiete (QbA), changing the grapes from Müller-Thurgau to 30% Riesling, and making it less sweet. It remains relatively low in alcohol at 9.5%.

== Brand extension ==
From 2001 on, Langguth also embarked on a brand extension, and has introduced several other wines under the Blue Nun name, including a German Riesling ice wine, a Languedoc Merlot and a Spanish rosé. Sales in 2004 rose by 11% in the UK, but from a low base.

In 2009, Blue Nun launched Blue Nun Gold, a sparkling wine that contained flakes of 22-carat gold. It was hoped the drink would appeal to young women drinkers and would help position the brand differently.

== In popular culture ==
- The Beastie Boys' track "Blue Nun" from their 1992 album Check Your Head takes its name from the wine and samples Peter Sichel's "On Wine: How to Select & Serve".
- British comedian Steve Coogan's character Alan Partridge is known for his preference for Blue Nun wine.
