= Song in the Silence =

1997 novel by Elizabeth Kerner

- Author: Elizabeth Kerner
- Cover artist: Peter Bollinger
- Language: English
- Series: Lanen Kaelar
- Genre: Fantasy novel
- Publisher: Tor Fantasy
- Publication date: 1997
- Publication place: America
- ISBN: 0-8125-6875-3
- OCLC: 48397097
- Preceded by: -
- Followed by: The Lesser Kindred

Song in the Silence is the debut novel of Elizabeth Kerner, and the first book in the Kolmar series. It was published in February 1997 by Tor Books.

== Plot summary ==
Lanen Kaelar is a young woman who has been raised in Hadronsstead, believing that Hadron (the horse-breeder) was her father. She leads an unhappy life as she secretly longs to meet the Dragons of legend, for which she has had a powerful fascination, but she is forced to remain at Hadron's farm.

When Hadron eventually dies, she feels freed. After an abrupt proposal from her cousin (who gets a bruise from her fist in response), she leaves to seek out the True Dragons of legend. On the journey she learns that her true father Marik has promised her as a demon sacrifice since before her birth, in payment for the making of an artifact that allows the user to see distant people and places.

She finds a ship to the Dragon Isle for the Lansip harvest that used to occur every ten years, but no ship has returned from the trip in over 100 years due to the violent storms that lie between Kolmar and the Dragon Isle. After travelling on the ship with her father Marik lurking dangerously on board, she makes it safely to the Dragon Isle and meets Akhor, the mighty silver-scaled king of the Kantri (known to humans as "dragons"). She seeks him out with the two words that she utters on instinct, that he respects her instantly for; 'My brother?' Akhor, weary of the 'ferrinshadik' (a longing to know the mind of another species, similar to what Lanen herself feels), reveals himself, and discovers that Lanen alone of the humans (Gedri) he has ever known, is capable of hearing and replying in Truespeech, the Kantri form of telepathy. It is a trait all the Kantri share.

Lanen meets Akhor, and for the first time since the Kantri departed the mainland, Kantri and Gedri are once again communicating with one another. Their meetings must be secret and both must break the rules of their people in order to meet with each other.

In a madly short time they fall in love, knowing even as it happens that it is folly. When Lanen is horribly burned while helping Mirazhe, another of the Kantri, to give birth to the first dragon child born for many years, Akhor is terrified that she will die of her injuries and reluctantly delivers her into the hands of the only healer on the island - an ally of Marik's.

Lanen is swiftly healed by the skilled ministrations of Marik's Healer, Maikel (Healers are humans who can wield a magical power to heal others), but is then spirited away by Marik, who intends to sacrifice Lanen to a demon in order to pay off a dark debt he has long owed. Lanen is kept ensorcelled and unable to call for aid, but Akhor learns of her plight from Rella, a human who came to the island ostensibly to gather Lansip leaves (which are worth their weight in silver due to their special healing properties), but she is actually a member of an order of spies, and she was hired to protect Lanen.

Akhor saves Lanen in the nick of time, slaying the demon lord Lanen was to be sacrificed to, but Marik and his demon-caller ally Caderan avoid Akhor's notice.

The assembled Council of the Kantri soon learn of Lanen and Akhor's love, and their transgressions, and are prepared to sentence them to exile or death when Lanen manages to sway them incline them to mercy with an impassioned speech in defense of their actions.

However, during Lanen's speech, Marik, consumed by greed, comes and steals the Soulgems of the Lost, a precious and irreplaceable treasure of the Kantri, while they are distracted. Akhor and two other of the Kantri pursue Marik back to his camp and a battle ensues, for Marik and his demon-calling servant Caderan had prepared for the possibility of a fight and so had demonic powers and items ready to oppose the Kantri with. Caderan is slain and Marik is driven insane, but Akhor suffers terrible wounds at Marik's hands and Rishkaan, one of the other kantri present at the fight, is killed.

Akhor as an entity dies of his wounds, but he is mysteriously transformed into human form. Together they travel back to Kolmar and are eventually married.
