= Kern, Alaska =

Ghost town in Alaska, United States

Coordinates: 60°54′25″N 149°04′41″W

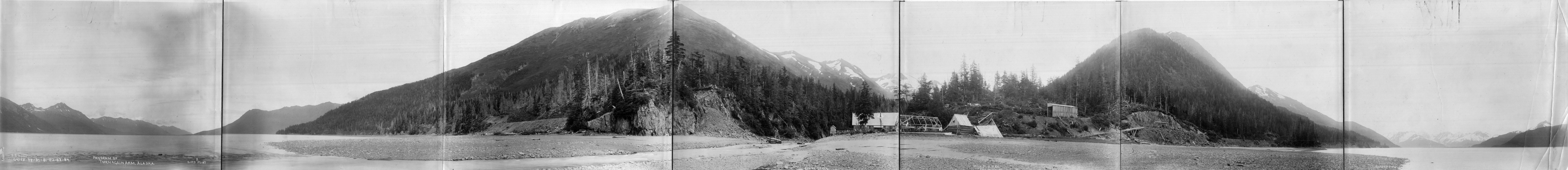
1914 Panorama photograph showing, at center-right, buildings at Kern Creek empting in to the Turnagain Arm

Kern is a former settlement on the Turnagain Arm in Alaska and a flagstop for the Alaska Railroad, about 71 miles (114 km) north of Seward, and 13 miles (21 km) east of Sunrise, Alaska. Kern was located near Kern Creek. In 1914 it was the end of the track of the Alaska Northern Railroad, after which it was purchased by the United States government.

In the summer of 1911 United States Secretary of the Interior, Walter L. Fisher, visited Kern as part of an inspection tour. The April 1915 contract to build a line of railroad from Seward to Kern was entered into the Congressional Record of the 64th United States Congress. The cost of shipping beer to Kern and other intermediate stations along the Alaska Railroad was entered in the Congressional Record of the 76th United States Congress in regard to the omnibus spending bill for that session and 1938 Senate hearings.
