= Kerner =

Kerner may refer to:

- Kerner (grape), a variety of white grape
- Kerner (surname), name origin and list of people with the surname Kerner
- Kerner Commission, established in 1967 by President Lyndon B. Johnson to investigate the causes of race riots in the United States
- Kerner Optical, a motion picture visual effects company

== See also ==
- Durand–Kerner method, root-finding algorithm for solving polynomial equations in numerical analysis
- Kerning, adjusting the spaces between typeset letters
