= Marc Kern (ice hockey) =

Swiss ice hockey player

- Born: April 28, 1989 (age 35); Switzerland
- Height: 6 ft 1 in (185 cm)
- Weight: 181 lb (82 kg; 12 st 13 lb)
- Position: Goaltender
- Catches: Left
- NLB team Former teams: SC Langenthal; NLA; SC Bern; SCL Tigers
- NHL draft: Undrafted
- Playing career: 2008–present

Marc Kern (born April 28, 1989) is a Swiss ice hockey goaltender. He is currently playing with the SC Langenthal of the National League B.
