= Lisa Kern =

German politician (born 1983)

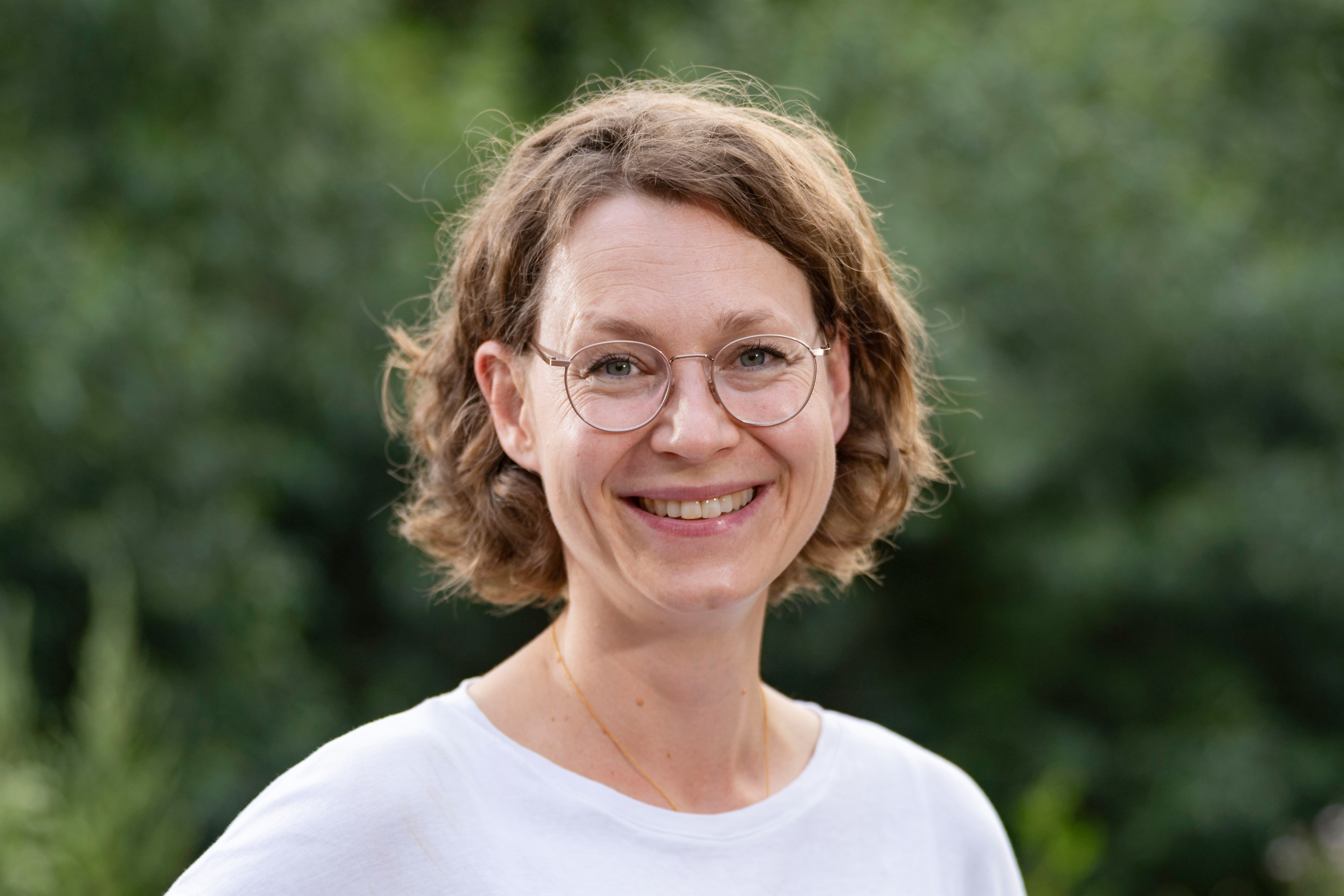
- Kern in 2023

Member of the Hamburg Parliament
- Incumbent
- Assumed office 18 March 2020
- Constituency: Lokstedt – Niendorf – Schnelsen

Personal details
- Born: 7 March 1983 (age 43)
- Party: Alliance 90/The Greens

Lisa Kern (born 7 March 1983) is a German politician serving as a member of the Hamburg Parliament since 2020. She has served as chairwoman of the Digitization and Data Protection Committee since 2025.
