= Ernst Wilhelm von Schlabrendorf =

Prussian politician (1719–1769)

Ernst Wilhelm von Schlabrendorf (4 February 1719 at Schloss Gröben bei Ludwigsfelde, Landkreis Teltow, Brandenburg–14 December 1769 in Breslau, Silesia) was a Prussian state minister for Silesia and president of the Silesian chamber. He was the son of the estate owner Johann Christian von Schlabrendorf († 1720), of Gröben, Groß- und Klein-Beuthen and Waßmannsdorf in Teltow, and his wife Anna Augusta Elisabeth von Pfuel (died 12 December 1744). The major general Gustav Albrecht von Schlaberndorf was his brother. On 5 December 1767 Frederick the Great awarded him with the Black Eagle Order. He is included among the relief figures on the Equestrian statue of Frederick the Great, erected in Berlin in 1851.
