= Elizabeth Kerner =

American novelist

- Born: 1958 (age 67–68)
- Education: University of St Andrews (MA)
- Occupation: Writer
- Spouse: Steven Beard (m. 2002)
- Writing career
- Genre: Fantasy

Elizabeth Kerner (born 1958) is an American fantasy writer. She is the author of Song in the Silence, The Lesser Kindred, and Redeeming the Lost, the initial trilogy of a series based upon humans re-establishing contact with dragons, who fled mortal lands thousands of years ago.

An American by birth, she moved to Scotland in 1976 to attend the University of St. Andrews. She obtained an MA (Hons) in English Language and Literature in 1981. She has since lived in New Orleans, East Sussex, Edinburgh, Hilo, Hawaii, Forest Grove, Oregon and Edinburgh again. Her day jobs have included being apprenticed to a variety of folk (mostly in Hilo) — a gold-smith, a book binder, and a short career as an assistant furniture and artwork restorer. In 1995 she moved back to her beloved Edinburgh, since which time she has spent 6 years, on and off, as a copy-editor on Monthly Notices of the Royal Astronomical Society, a cutting-edge astronomy journal. In 2002 she married Dr Steven Beard, continuing the astronomy connection. They presently live with two cats in a small town on the Firth of Forth.

She is currently working on the next three books in the Kolmar series.

== Publications ==
- Song in the Silence: the Tale of Lanen Kaelar (1997) ISBN 0-312-85780-2
- The Lesser Kindred (2001) ISBN 0-312-89066-4
- Redeeming the Lost (2004) ISBN 0-312-89065-6
