= Kirn (surname) =

Kirn is a surname. Notable people with the surname include:

- Hans Kirn (1920–2007), German Luftwaffe pilot
- Louis Joseph Kirn, United States Navy admiral
- Otto Kirn (1857–1911), German theologian
- Roman Kirn, Permanent Representative of Slovenia to the United Nations
- Walter Kirn, American novelist and critic
