= Churches European Rural Network =

The Churches European Rural Network (CERN) is a network of individuals and representatives of churches in Europe advocating the concerns of rural and agricultural communities within the Church and beyond. CERN has a particular interest in promoting Christian pastoral care in rural communities. The impact of the reforms to the European Union's Common Agriculture Policy is of interest, especially in the effects that this would have on the lives of many farmers.

The network is mainly concentrated in Germany and the UK, but with other individuals also playing an active role. CERN also has close connections with the Conference of European Churches. The Secretary of CERN is the Reverend Rudi Job, a retired pastor living near Kaiserslautern, Germany. The name of the network in German is Europäischer Arbeitskreis für Landfragen.
