= Lingfield Cernes =

Coordinates: 51.1084°N 0.032°W

- Site of Special Scientific Interest
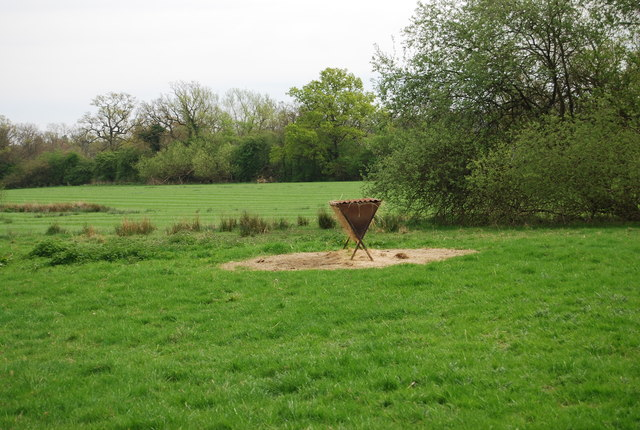
- Location of Lingfield Cernes.
- Area of search: Surrey
- Grid reference: TQ 421 447
- Interest: Biological
- Area: 10.3 hectares (25 acres)
- Notification date: 1985
- Location map: Magic Map

Lingfield Cernes is a 10.3-hectare (25-acre) biological Site of Special Scientific Interest east of Lingfield in Surrey.

== Site details ==
This site has unimproved meadows which are poorly drained and there are a number of uncommon plants, including two which are nationally scarce, true fox-sedge and narrow-leaved water dropwort. The site also has species-rich mature hedgerows and aquatic plants in ditches which run into the Eden Brook, which runs along the northern boundary.

The site is private land but it is crossed by public footpaths.
