= Johann Georg Kerner =

German physician and political journalist

Georg Kerner
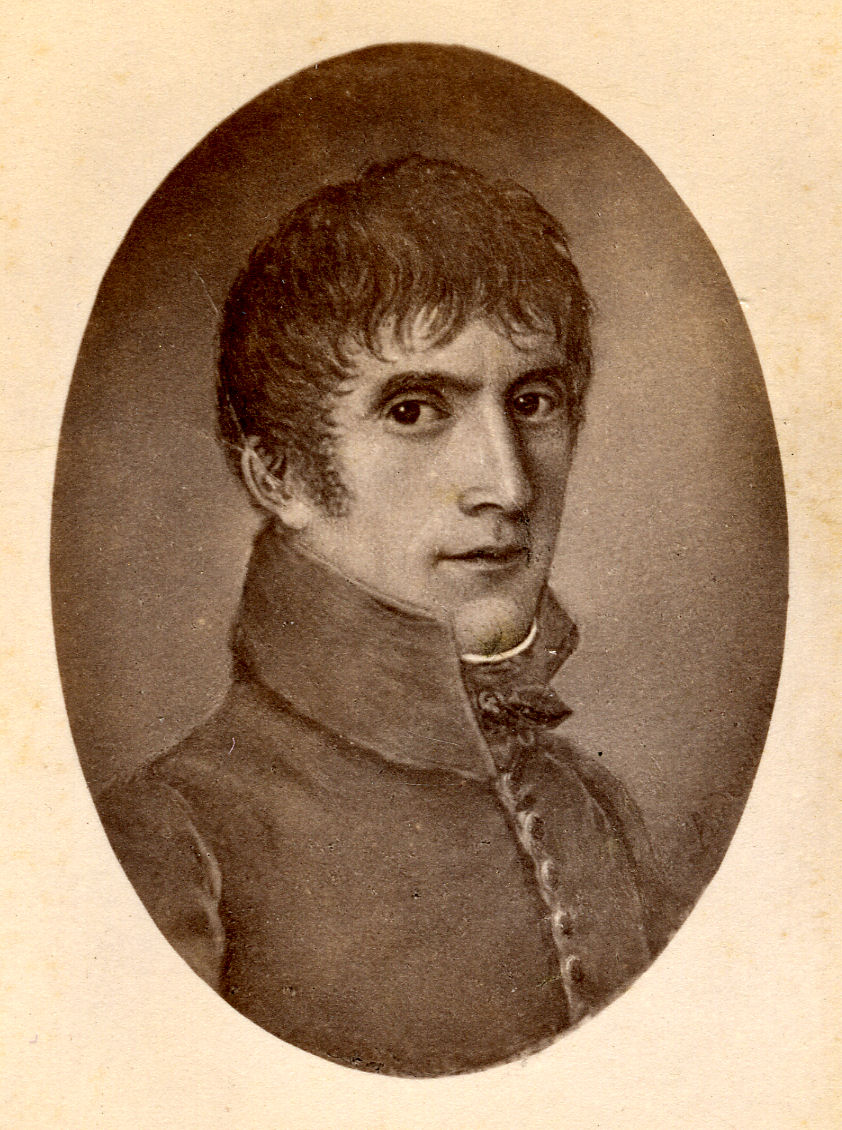
- Georg Kerner
- Born: Johann Georg Kerner; 9 April 1770; Ludwigsburg, Württemberg, Holy Roman Empire
- Died: April 7, 1812 (aged 41); Hamburg, Germany
- Occupations: Physician; Political journalist and essayist
- Spouse: Johanna Friederike Duncker
- Children: Bonafine; Klara Theone; Sacontala; Georg Reinhold
- Parent(s): Christoph Ludwig Kerner (1744-1799); Friederike Luise Stockmaier (1750-1817)

Johann Georg Kerner (9 April 1770 – 7 April 1812) was a physician and a political journalist who became a critical chronicler of the French Revolution.

== Life ==
=== Provenance and kinships ===
(Johann) Georg Kerner was the elder brother of the poet-writer Justinus Kerner. The brothers were born in Ludwigsburg, a short distance to the north of Stuttgart. Their father, Christoph Ludwig Kerner (1744–1799) was an Oberamtmann (senior government administrator) in Württemberg (like his father before him), a loyal servant of Duke Karl Eugen and a stern father to his sons.

Through their maternal grandmother, born Wilhelmine Luise Herpfer (1730–1788) Johann Georg and Justinius Kerner shared an illustrious pedigree. Ancestors included the physicians Johann Bacmeister (1624–1686) and Matthäus Bacmeister (1580–1626) along with the Lutheran theologian and church organist Lucas Bacmeister (1530–1608).

Georg was the eldest of his parents' twelve recorded children. (Justinus was the youngest.) However, only two of the daughters and four of the sons survived to adulthood. One of the daughters later became the mother of the industrialising politician Ferdinand von Steinbeis (1807–1893). One of the other sons, Karl von Kerner served in the Württemberg army, ennobled in 1806 and later becoming Interior Minister, in which capacity he made an important contribution to modernising the steel industry.

=== Early years ===
As a schoolboy attending the Latin school (classical/grammaer school) in his home town Kerner, who was physically small and weak, suffered both from his father's severity and from bullying by schoolmates. His contrarian spirit remained unbroken, however, even after his father secured his admission in 1779 to the élite Karlsschule (military and general academy) in Stuttgart, described by one source as "the duke's prestigious institute intended to supply loyal government officials, half boarding school, half university". Other pupils included Friedrich Schiller. Despite the military academy, Kerner never conformed intellectually to what was expected of him. In a speech on the Name day of the academy's founder, Württemberg's aging ruler, Duke Karl Eugen, Kerner called for the establishment of a system of state run welfare for the poor. Schiller quit the academy in favour of a career in theatre in 1782, but Kerner was still a student in 1789. He established a political club within the academy devoted to support for the French Revolution. Other members included Christian Heinrich Pfaff, Ernst Franz Ludwig Marschall von Bieberstein and Joseph Anton Koch. On 14 July 1790 they held a secret celebration to mark the first anniversary of the Storming of the Bastille. These and similar actions on the part of Kerner and his friends provoked an adverse reaction in conservative Württemberg among the citizens and the aristocratic French emigrants whom they took to their hearts. With help from friends Kerner produced a dissertation that concluded his studies and earned him his qualification, in Easter 1791, as a physician. Now, accompanied by the first serious love of his life, he moved to Strasbourg under the pretext of wishing to improve his medical knowledge at the university.

=== The young revolutionary ===
Despite being still a predominantly German speaking city, Strasbourg had been incorporated into France since shortly after 1681. By moving there Kerner lost his education bursary and the right to return home without punishment. He also lost Auguste Breyer, the Stuttgart girl to whom he had become engaged: she stayed behind in Stuttgart. In Strasbourg he could become active as a revolutionary in the land of the revolution. He became a member of the "Society of Friends of the Constitution" and was elected its German-language secretary on 12 July 1791. He also learned to deliver speeches in French and began to provide political article for news journals. His furious father wrote ordering him to go from Strasbourg to Vienna to complete his studies. Instead, at the end of 1791, penniless, he traveled on foot to Paris, still the fulcrum of a rapidly evolving sequence of defining events. In Paris he was able to provide for himself by working as a doctor in a city hospital and writing reports for a Hamburg newspaper. Between the end of 1791 and 1794 he was an eye-witness - and in many cases also a participant - in the French Revolution. Just as he had before, in Paris he gathered around himself a group of young Germans who shared his commitment to the revolutionary precepts of "liberty, equality and fraternity". Some of these were Adam Lux, Gustav von Schlabrendorf, Konrad Engelbert Oelsner, Georg Forster and Charles-Frédéric Reinhard. However, like his political friends, Kerner was mistrustful of the radicalisation of the revolution and the accompanying loss of freedom, as a result of which he sometimes found himself aligned with counter-revolutionary currents with which he was not necessarily in sympathy. This was behind the seeming closeness to the Girondins of many of the more thoughtful German supporters of the revolution. But Kerner did not himself retreat from the revolutionary ideals which he still found more worthy of humanity than life "under the grinding anarchy" ("unter den Greueln der Anarchie") of the enduring feudalism which he identified in Austria, Prussia and Russia.

By 1794 the revolution was being exported to neighboring states by France's "revolutionary armies", while in Paris the Terror was, at least till it devoured its best remembered author at the end of July, increasingly uncontrolled and unpredictable. Kerner's name appeared on a list of those to be arrested. With Konrad Engelbert Oelsner and other members of the German community he fled in April to Switzerland. The French diplomatic mission in Switzerland now persuaded Kerner to return to Württemberg on behalf of France to try and negotiate a separate peace, or at least some form of neutrality, with the Duke of Württemberg. The mission failed and at the start of 1795 Kerner returned to Paris.

He wrote a series of articles for Paul Usteri's journal "Klio", under the heading "Letters from Paris" in which he described the events in which he was involved. His measured attitude repeatedly placed him in danger, as when he tried to mediate with the crowd in the sans-culottes' insurrection of Germinal and Prairial (late spring/early summer). He nevertheless retained links to his like-minded political allies, now extending beyond the German expatriate community: these included Emmanuel Joseph Sieyès and Jens Baggesen.

=== Government service ===
Charles-Frédéric Reinhard, like Kerner originally from Württemberg, was appointed by the French Directory (revolutionary government) to a position as Minister Plenipotentiary to the Hanseatic League which involved a posting to Hamburg between 1795 and 1798. Kerner accompanied Reinhard to Hamburg as his private secretary, which gave rise to new political challenges. He still backed the expansionist policies of revolutionary France, commending these in liberal and democratic circles in Hamburg, notably the poet Friedrich Gottlieb Klopstock. At this stage there was still much support in Hamburg for the ideals emanating from revolutionary France. Frequently he was sent on special missions, often on horseback, between Germany, the Netherlands and France. His diplomatic efforts generally went unrewarded, not least on account of the rather direct manner in which he communicated his support for the revolutionary cause. As a spy at the Hildesheim Congress he was seen as a revolutionist, a reaction which he also encountered at Berlin and on a mission to St. Petersburg.

Around 1796 he was pursuing a correspondence with influential contemporaries such as Adolph Freiherr Knigge, Talleyrand, the Abbé Sieyès and the philosopher Schelling. He founded a political club, masquerading as a philanthropic association, in Altona, adjacent to Hamburg but at the time part of Denmark, but it was denounced as a Jacobin Club by some alarmed Hamburgers and it had already been banned by 1797. Kerner was back in Paris on a brief visit which coincided with the anti-royalist Coup of 18 Fructidor (5 September 1797) and was, as he wrote, impressed by the role played by the increasingly political General Napoleon Buonaparte in securing the republic.

In May 1798 Kerner accompanied Reinhard, who by now had been appointed French envoy in Florence, to the Grand Duchy of Tuscany. On the way he diverted to Württemberg where he made his peace with his father who died the next year. True to himself, Kerner involved himself in the political ferment in Italy and acted in support of the French revolutionary cause. He armed an ad hoc citizen militia and launched an attack on the insurrectionist inhabitants of Arezzo, during the course of which he was wounded by a shot in his armpit. However, Kerner's injury did not prevent him from now rushing to Netherlands at Reinhard's prompting, after the two of them had been forced, by the rising intensity of what was becoming a civil was there, to flee from Tuscany to France. In the Netherlands he took part in a battle against coalition forces as a pioneer officer. His time in the Netherlands was relatively brief, however.

=== No longer a fan of French political developments ===
After Napoleon's coup in November 1799 Reinhard was transferred from Tuscany to the recently formed Helvetic Republic (Switzerland). Kerner accompanied him as French legation secretary. By this time, seeing Napoleon's policy in respect of the conquered territories, Kerner was growing critical of Napoleon and of the French approach to them. He admired Napoleon the general, but rejected Napoleon the imperialist politician. He travelled to his home in Württemberg, where his attempts to organise a "peaceful insurrection" failed. While he was in Switzerland he became acquainted with Johann Heinrich Pestalozzi and became an admirer of Pesalozzi's pioneering educational reform work. He concluded that an education which balanced mental, physical and practical abilities in equal measure offered a way out of the political dilemmas of the age. Attempts to build a career in the Helvetic Republic as a political journalist-polemicist came to nothing however. He returned to Hamburg where he began a new career as a merchant. However, "liberalism" was now in retreat: the political mood in the city had turned against the French cause, which by now seemed to many - including Kerner himself - to have more to do with empire building than with liberty, fraternity or equality: his political past made him suspect with the conservative Hanseatic merchant community. He then established a newspaper, the "North Star" ("Der Nordstern"). He wrote all the articles himself and also attended to distribution. The newspaper was produced only between March and July 1802, after which it was closed down, following the return of Reinhard, now as French ambassador, thanks to its numerous insufficiently veiled criticisms of Napoleon, whom the city senate of Hamburg was by this time keen not to provoke. The friendship with Reinhard was over.

=== The physician ===
His career now underwent a determined change of direction: "I had wanted to dedicate my life to the struggle against the spiritual troubles of mankind, but I was not able to do that. Now I turned back to my youthful determination to struggle against the physical infirmities of humanity". He refreshed his medical training at the University of Copenhagen and in 1803 settled to a career as a physician in Hamburg. He introduced in the city the smallpox vaccination which he had encountered on a trip to Sweden, and in 1804 was given a public appointment by the city senate a "Physician for the Barracks" (which refers to a quarter of the city corresponding to the St. Pauli quarter. In addition to introducing the vaccination he worked tirelessly to build up the city's childbirth provision and to promote social and welfare provision more generally.

None of this put an end to Kerner's journalistic activity. He wrote regular articles for the Hamburg weekly paper "Nordische Miszellen" ("Northern Miscellany") in which he gave vent to his political dissatisfaction. That increased after 1806 when the French armies occupied the city. They also occupied Bremen and Lübeck. Because of Kerner's long standing contacts with the French Empire, these appointed him to represent them with the occupying authorities who were based in Hamburg.

In 1806 the senate appointed him to the additional office of "Armenarzt" ("Physician to the poor"). Early in 1812 he became infected with "Nerves Fever" - probably a variation of Typhus. After twelve hours of unconsciousness he died, two days short of his forty-second birthday. He was buried in the graveyard at St. Peter's Church in central Hamburg. An obituary appeared in the Hamburgischer Correspondent, which at that time was the most widely distributed German language newspaper in the world, praising Kerner for his "... disinterested selflessness, rare geniality and uncompromising openness which his friends treasured. He seemed, in a short but full life, to have completed the goals of a longer one". The tribute was generous, but sadly misleading. Georg Kerner's greatest purpose, the goal of his life, was a free united socially coherent Germany. In 1812 that remained a dream.

== Output (selection) ==
- Über den wichtigen Einfluß gut eingerichteter Kranken-Anstalten und Armen-Häuser auf das Wohl eines Staates. Rede zum Namenstag des Herzogs Karl Eugen. Stuttgart 1790
- Einige Bemerkungen über Tochtergeschwülste. Doktorarbeit Stuttgart 1791
- Briefe aus Paris. In: Klio. vol 1, sections 2–4, 1705, pp. 245–261, 310–379 and 424–506 plus vol 2, section 5, 1795, pp. 90–126
- Der Nordstern. Ein politisches Wochenblatt. 1.–19. Stück, 1802
- Reise über den Sund. Cotta, Tübingen 1803
- Das blaue Fieber (Gedicht gegen Napoleon), not earlier than 1806
- Über das Hamburgische Entbindungshaus und das Entbindungswesen der Armenanstalt. Hamburg 1810
