= Foreign Reports =

American consulting firm

Foreign Reports Inc. is a Washington, D.C.–based consulting firm for the oil industry, founded in 1956. Foreign Reports advises energy companies, governments, and financial institutions on world energy issues, with a specialization on the Middle East. The president of the firm is Nathaniel Kern.

== Overview ==
Foreign Reports has been in this business for more than 50 years and counts among its subscribers many of the world's largest oil companies—both international and national—as well as many other financial institutions. It reports on political developments that are highly relevant to oil markets, crude oil price formation, and related macroeconomic variables.

== Methods ==
In providing political intelligence and analysis of world oil markets, Foreign Reports uses three tools:

- Focus: Its Reports focus on political questions that impact oil markets. They are brief (rarely more than two pages), single-topic reports and are transmitted three to five times a week to its clients. They filter out the mass of extraneous intelligence which accumulates every day in today's world.
- Facts: The Reports do more than focus on what is truly relevant; they are also the product of intensive efforts to go to difficult-to-access sources to find out what political decisions are being made and why they are being made. Sources are more comfortable and more open in talking with Foreign Reports because they know that their identities will be protected and that the information they provide will receive highly limited circulation.
- Analysis: Frequently the focus and the facts are not enough to predict uncertain outcomes. Foreign Reports uses its expertise and experience in world oil markets to create a focused product that is relevant to these markets.

== History ==
Foreign Reports was founded in 1956 by Harry Kern, who had previously been foreign editor of Newsweek, in which capacity he traveled extensively throughout the world, but especially in the Far and Middle East.

Newsweek and Time during that period were practically the sole elements of the U.S. news media reporting on world activities in a timely fashion. As foreign editor, Harry Kern also was editor-in-chief of the magazine's International Edition and thus had the privilege of picking who or what would adorn the cover of those editions. Since various foreign leaders, or aspiring ones, angled to get their pictures on the front of Newsweek, Kern was a popular visitor in many foreign capitals. In the process, he managed to befriend both current and future leaders and to gain insights into how their policies were developed.

Foreign Reports grew out of these unique circumstances, as Kern saw a need among growing multinational companies with sizable stakes around the world for a level of international political reporting that surpassed what was then being carried in the daily newspapers of the period. From Newsweek, he brought with him to Foreign Reports two bureau chiefs, one in Beirut and one in Tokyo. From these "bureaus" of Foreign Reports came a steady stream of insightful reporting on the regions they covered. Among its initial major subscribers were the world's major oil companies, but also other industrial and banking concerns.

== Oil crises ==
In the year of its founding, Foreign Reports benefited from one of the first oil crises that have afflicted the Middle East over the years—the 1956 Suez Crisis, with its concomitant closure of the Suez Canal, which was a great boon to notable tanker owners of the time, who were avid clients of Foreign Reports.

Since that time, Foreign Reports has closely covered for its subscribers all the major and minor crises that have bedeviled world oil markets ever since, as well as the broad geopolitical trends that have affected markets and business conditions. The methods it uses to anticipate the unanticipated are relatively straightforward and avoid being unduly alarmist. They are methods that have been refined over time.

Most every crisis begins with a series of rumbles, and the rumbles have to be distinguished from mere bluster and bombast. Knowing who the players are, how they think, what they confide in others, their history of risk-taking and their own domestic political requirements is essential. As any potential crisis builds, often over a period of months, Foreign Reports writes up a contemporaneous narrative, covering the story as it develops, often focusing on key details, which, only later, historians pick up on and piece together.

== Foreign Reports and the Middle East ==
The Middle East, with its vast reserves of petroleum, was an obvious early focus of Foreign Reports, especially as the firm's subscribers had substantial equity interests in oil concessions in that volatile part of the world, where Kern remained a frequent visitor to many of the key players—the Shah of Iran, Gamal Abdul Nasser of revolutionary Egypt, Crown Prince Faisal of Saudi Arabia, etc. Kern also maintained close relationships with the leading foreign policy actors in the Eisenhower administration, notably Secretary of State John Foster Dulles and his brother, CIA Director Allen Dulles, forging a long relationship with U.S. intelligence, both in Washington and in the agency's foreign "stations".

Nathaniel Kern (also Nat Kern) joined his father at Foreign Reports in 1972 after graduating from Princeton University and attending the University of Riyadh in 1970 and 1971 as the first non-Arab student. By the time he graduated and joined the firm, rumblings of the first full-scale "energy crisis" had begun and the role of Saudi Arabia on the world scene began to be transformed.

Within two years of Nat's joining the firm, the world of oil and the Middle East had changed dramatically, with prices skyrocketing and the volumes of crude oil being produced in Saudi Arabia growing steadily. The firm's business branched out from providing political reporting on oil in the Middle East into also providing business development assistance to firms wishing to break into new markets in the Middle East, primarily, though not exclusively, in Saudi Arabia. The main areas the firm concentrated in were competitive bidding opportunities in the power and desalination markets. This required an understanding of the technologies, engineering and procurement issues inherent in complex projects, and Foreign Reports brought on board the necessary skilled individuals in these areas.

Nat Kern was a frequent visitor to Iraq during the 1980–1988 Iran-Iraq war, at a time when U.S.-Iraqi relations were improving, and was tasked by the U.S. government with maintaining ties with certain key Iraqi officials from 1991 onwards, at a time when the U.S. government maintained a policy of shunning any official contact with the Iraqi government.

== Changing realities of the oil market ==
By the early 1980s, the nature of the world oil business began to change in a number of different ways, all of which affected how Foreign Reports would be able to continue to provide services to its client base. The major international oil companies were gradually losing their equity ownership of Middle East oil production and many needed to forge different kinds of relationships with producing governments. In addition, a new class of players in the oil market was gradually emerging as interest and liquidity grew in the futures market. World oil prices had been practically a secret in the early days of Foreign Reports and had been remarkably stable in general during the firm's first 16 years, but it would be another ten years before price volatility would become a major reason for the firm to develop another service for its clients.

OPEC did not institute its first quotas until 1982, just as crude oil prices were beginning to come under downward pressure in the market. When prices did eventually start to crash in late November 1985, no other reporting service in the industry had so closely chronicled how that crash would materialize as Foreign Reports had done. The firm had watched intensely how then Saudi Petroleum Minister Ahmed Zaki Yamani had wrestled over new ways to price Saudi Arabia's oil as he cruised the Mediterranean on his yacht during August 1985. Foreign Reports was the first to report that Yamani, just before that Labor Day, had got off his yacht and signed "net-back pricing deals" with his main international customers. These deals that would cut all previous supports for crude oil prices and lead prices from the high $20s to the single digits within nine months. Incredibly, in those early days of the NYMEX, futures prices did not start to decline until the day after Thanksgiving.

As the pace and sophistication of NYMEX trading has accelerated greatly since those days, and as access to the incredible amounts of information over the internet has exploded, the services that Foreign Reports has offered have also changed, while still staying with time-tested methods: follow the narrative; know the actors; know their characters; understand the rules; understand cultures and histories; pay ever increasing attention to separating the wheat from the chaff in an information-laden age; and communicate concisely and clearly.

== Current work ==
Foreign Reports continues to report on political developments that are highly relevant to oil markets, crude oil price formation, and related macroeconomic variables. It closely monitors and reports on the political and economic situations in places such as: Iraq, Iran, Saudi Arabia, Nigeria, and Venezuela. The firm also reports on OPEC politics and examines what oil production decisions might be looming in the near future. Executive and legislative activities in the U.S. which affect world oil markets are also often reported on.

- Iraq: Many of the world's major oil companies currently rely on Foreign Reports for their understanding of Iraq's political events, the status of its oil industry, and the broad trends which appear to be shaping the future of the country. With the security situation in Iraq not yet suitable for international oil companies to have much of a physical presence there, and because Western news agencies have a limited number of journalists stationed throughout the country, many energy companies, governments, and financial institutions rely extensively on the political reporting and analysis done by Foreign Reports.
- Iran: The political and economic events in Iran are often discussed, yet rarely understood. Foreign Reports has shown an ability to look beyond the bluster and bombast coming out of Iran, in an attempt to understand what is really making things work in its domestic and international affairs. Recent reports have analyzed President Ahmadinejad's unique economic policies; Iranian involvement in Iraq; the effects of sanctions and the trajectory of the nuclear file; the Iranian risk premium; Iran's winter gas crisis; and Iran's inability to sell the heavy sour crude from its Nowruz and Soroush fields.
- Saudi Arabia: With extensive experience and contacts in Saudi Arabia, Foreign Reports is able to report with confidence on the country with the largest oil reserves, highest level of oil production, and the highest spare production capacity. Political and economic decisions made by the Kingdom are critical to world oil markets, and Foreign Reports closely follows these developments. Recent reports have analyzed Saudi oil policies; the Saudi viewpoint on oil prices; the development of the 500,000 barrels per day project soon to be brought online from the Kingdom's Khursaniyah field; and the 1.2 million barrels per day project at the Khurais field expected to be brought online in June 2009.

== Sources ==
- Foreign Reports Inc. Homepage
- Saudi-American Relations
