= Robert Henry Kern =

American engineer and entrepreneur

- Born: Robert Henry Kern; February 8, 1930; New York, New York
- Died: June 4, 2015 (aged 85); Danvers, Massachusetts

Robert Henry Kern (died June 4, 2015 in Danvers, Massachusetts) was an American engineer and entrepreneur who is known as the key developer responsible for designing and building the first operational space-borne cesium clock. He was also an internationally-recognized designer of cesium beam tubes and an innovator in the field of time and frequency.

Kern's work also contributed directly to the development of the Global Positioning System. Frequency and Time Systems supplied two modified cesium beam oscillators for the U.S. Navy's Navigation Technology Satellite 2 (NTS-2), and Kern was identified as the developer of the atomic clock used in the program. His space-borne cesium clock was subsequently verified on the fifth GPS vehicle.

Kern was born and educated in New York City. He earned a bachelor's degree of science in electrical engineering and a master's degree from the Cornell University College of Engineering. Kern served two years on active duty with the U.S. Air Force.

From 1962 until 1969, Kern was associated with the Quantum Electronics Division of Varian Associates which was acquired and reorganized by Hewlett Packard as the Frequency and Time East Division of Hewlett Packard. He was responsible for the design and engineering of cesium tubes which were utilized around the world.

In 1971, Kern founded the company Frequency and Time Systems and served as its president and general manager. In 1978, he sold his interest in this company and in the following year founded Kernco in Danvers, Massachusetts, where he lived since 1960. Kernco instrumentation flew on every space shuttle flight from 1995 until the end of the space shuttle program. Kern held eight patents relating to atomic clocks and technology that made GPS feasible.
