= Adam Lux =

18th-century German revolutionary

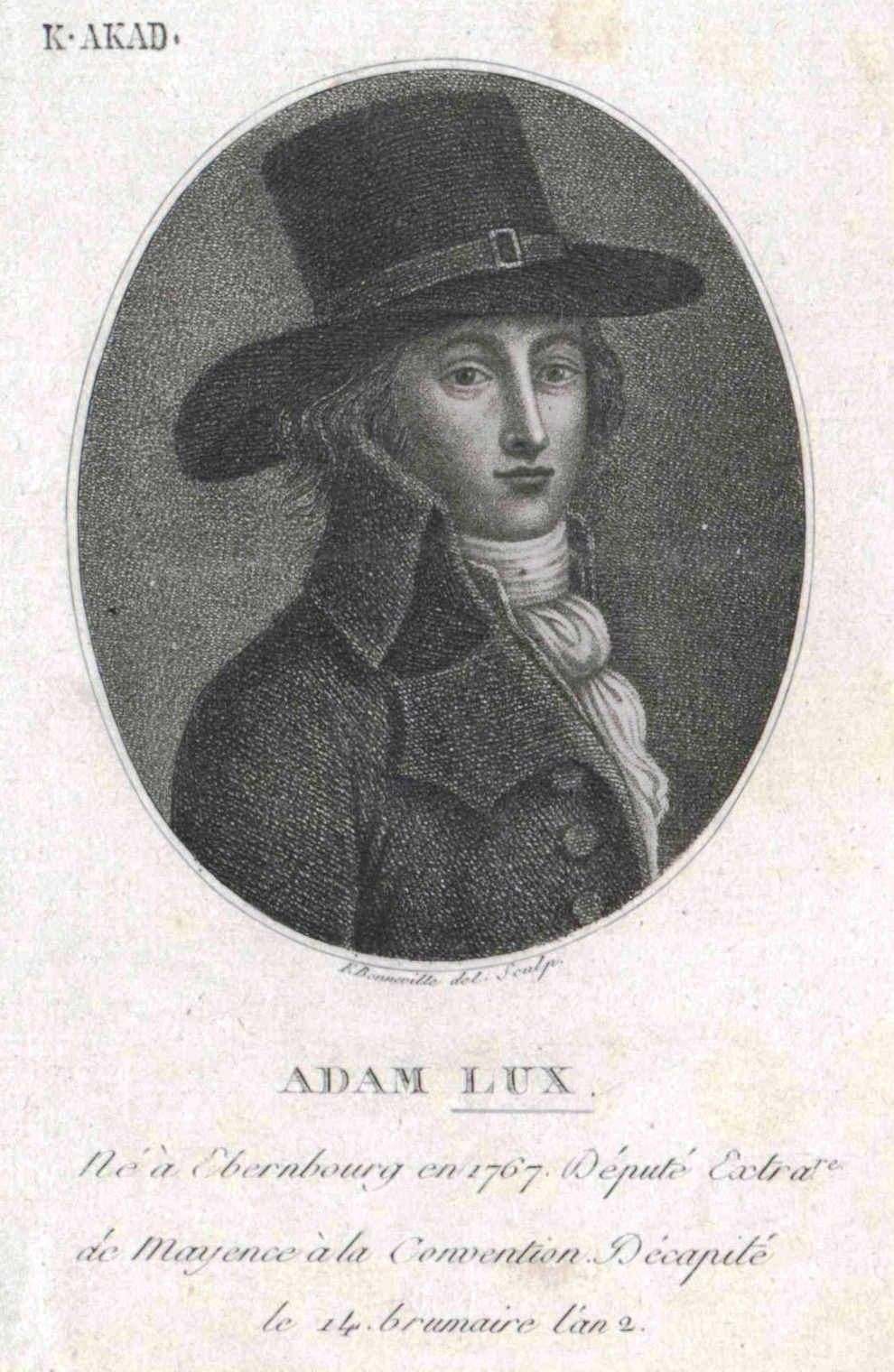
Adam Lux, drawing by François Bonneville

Adam Lux (27 December 1765 – 4 November 1793) was a German revolutionary and sympathiser of the French Revolution.

== Life ==
=== Early life ===
Lux was born in Obernburg am Main, a village belonging to the Electorate of Mainz, as a farmer's son. However, his parents managed to finance his studies at the University of Mainz (in the Archbishopric of Mainz of the Holy Roman Empire, nowadays in Rhineland-Palatinate), where he became a Dr. phil. with his Latin dissertation on the notion of enthusiasm.

As a destitute academic, he first worked as a tutor for a merchant family in Mainz, into which he married. His wife's dowry made it possible for him to buy an estate in Kostheim, where he followed the call of the French philosopher Jean-Jacques Rousseau by getting back to nature, and became a farmer.

=== Republic of Mainz ===
His advocacy of the French Revolution was expressed through an odd political action: after a three-day-long informative meeting, Lux held a referendum, about whether his homeland should enter the French First Republic, on 2 November 1792 in Kostheim. Of the 223 men entitled to vote, 213 supported an accession to France; only 2 rejected the idea, the remaining 8 couldn't take part in the referendum. The result of poll was celebrated with a feast, whose climax was the planting of a liberty pole.

Lux then moved to Mainz with his family, where the Rhenish-German National Convention, the parliament of the Republic of Mainz, founded according to the French example and chaired by Andreas Joseph Hofmann elected him to be a representative.

=== In France ===
On 21 March 1793, the convention sent the naturalist and writer Georg Forster, the merchant André Potocki, and him to Paris, to complete the planned accession to France. In Paris he met several German friends of freedom, such as Konrad Engelbert Oelsner and Johann Georg Kerner, who shared his disappointment with the development of the Revolution. They were disgusted by the eruption of the Terror and the radicalization of the Sans-culottes and the Jacobin Club.

On 17 July 1793 Lux witnessed the execution of the Girondist Charlotte Corday, who had assassinated the radical agitator Jean-Paul Marat. With the publication of provoking pamphlets, in which he justified the killing as an act of liberation, he was apparently risking his life deliberately, although not all motives of his behavior at this time are comprehensible nowadays, especially those concerning his relation to Corday and her actions. The poet Justinus Kerner, whose older brother Johann Georg Kerner witnessed the events in Paris, reported on these activities in his book Bilderbuch aus meiner Knabenzeit, which was based on his brother's records.

=== Death and legacy ===
After giving up the intention of publicly killing himself in front of the National Convention, in order to protest against the violence of revolutionary goals, he set out to be executed by his former political friends. According to eyewitnesses, Lux ascended the guillotine's scaffold, as if it were a rostrum.

Because of his mysterious fate, Lux drew the attention of his contemporaries. Jean Paul wrote: "[Let] no German forget him!". According to the American Germanist Thomas Saine, Johann Wolfgang von Goethe even based the first husband of Dorothea in his epic Hermann and Dorothea (1798) on Lux. In contrast, the interest in Lux declined in later periods.
