= Kern AG =

German language service provider

KERN AG
- Company type: AG
- Industry: Global Language Services
- Founded: Frankfurt, Germany (1969)
- Headquarters: Frankfurt am Main, Germany
- Key people: Manfred Kern, Ruthild Birte Kern, Michael Kern, Dr. Thomas Kern

KERN Global Language Services is an internationally active language service provider of German origin.

== History ==
The company started out as KERN Internationale Handels- und Vertriebsgesellschaft mbH (KERN International Trade and Distribution Company) (Logo) which was founded in 1969 by Manfred and Ruthild Birte Kern in Frankfurt am Main, Germany. Initially, the company focused on data processing and printed products.

Linguistic and translation services came into play for the first time within the context of a printing commission. The Barbados Tourist Board intended to print a brochure in Germany and came up with the idea of creating an English edition to promote the beauty of the Caribbean island throughout Europe. Due to the success of this major pilot project, KERN changed course by placing greater emphasis on translation projects.

KERN soon gained clients across Germany and Europe to such an extent that demand could no longer be met at one location. The first branch opened in Duesseldorf in 1979. With subsequent branch openings, the company was renamed KERN GmbH, Language Services. The first overseas branch was opened in 1983 in Paris. The foundation of KERN Corporation in New York City followed in 1985. In the 1990s, the company expanded and extended its network of branches in Germany, United States; Switzerland, England, China and Netherlands.

In 1997, the company was again renamed KERN AG, Global Language Services. Headquarters relocated to a listed building in Frankfurt in May 2005. It is at these headquarters that KERN currently combines its entire range of language services under one roof. Today, KERN Global Language Services operates in 8 countries, with over 40 company owned subsidiaries and branches.

The original printing and data processing field of the company continues its important role of the KERN group, and now operates under the name of KERN & Partner Finanzwerbeagentur GmbH. (KERN & Partners Financial Advertising Agency). The range of language services offered “under one roof” at its headquarters enables the KERN group not only to simply translate texts, but also to work on documents in their entirety – from translation, design of advertising campaigns, desktop publishing to printing and delivery of the final product.

At the beginning of 2000, the KERN group absorbed the Institut für Kreatives Lernen (IKL) (Institute for Creative Learning) which offers language training for specialists and executive staff. The resulting company, KERN AG IKL Business Language Training & Co. KG, offers modern language training across Germany and Europe. KERN AG IKL is also a recognised test centre for the Educational Testing Service (ETS) and offers the opportunity to take the Test of English as a Foreign Language (TOEFL) online, an Admissions prerequisite of many English speaking universities, especially the United States. Test of English for International Communication (TOEIC), Test de français international (TFI), London Chamber of Commerce and Industry (LCCI) are additional tests that can be taken at KERN AG IKL.

== Areas of business ==
KERN Global Language Services core services comprise translation into all world languages, as well as terminology management, layout editing, DTP (Desktop Publishing), the localization of software and websites, in addition to language training.

== Company locations ==
The company has branches in the following areas of Germany:

Headquarters: Frankfurt am Main (Kurfürstenstraße). Branches (in 2018): Aachen, Augsburg, Berlin, Bielefeld, Bochum, Bonn, Braunschweig, Bremen, Cologne, Darmstadt, Dortmund, Dresden, Duisburg, Düsseldorf, Essen, Frankfurt am Main (Schillerstraße), Freiburg, Friedrichshafen, Hamburg, Hannover, Heilbronn, Ingolstadt, Kaiserslautern, Karlsruhe, Kassel, Kiel, Leipzig, Mainz, Mannheim, Mönchengladbach, Munich, Münster, Nuremberg, Offenbach, Regensburg, Saarbrücken, Schweinfurt, Stuttgart, Ulm, Weil am Rhein, Wiesbaden, Wuppertal, Würzburg.

The company has overseas branches in

- Austria: Graz, Innsbruck, Linz, Salzburg, Vienna
- The Netherlands: Amsterdam, Eindhoven, Rotterdam, Utrecht
- Poland: Warsaw
- France: Lyon, Marseille, Paris
- United Kingdom: London
- United States: New York City, San Francisco

=== Subsidiaries ===
- KERN Austria GmBH (Graz, Innsbruck, Linz, Salzburg and Vienna, Austria)
- KERN Sarl (Paris and Lyon, France)
- KERN (UK) Ltd. (London, England)
- KERN B.V. Vertaal- en tolkservice (Amsterdam, Eindhoven, Rotterdam and Utrecht, the Netherlands)
- KERN Polska Sp. z o.o. (Warsaw, Poland)
- KERN Corporation (New York, USA)
- KERN Corporation (San Francisco, USA)
- KERN Ltd. (Hong Kong, China)
