= Nathaniel Kern =

Nathaniel Kern, also known as Nat Kern, is President of Foreign Reports Inc., a consulting firm founded in 1956 to provide political reporting and analysis for the oil industry. He has been with the firm since 1972, becoming Vice President in 1975 and President in 1990. His company advises energy companies, governments, and financial institutions on world energy issues, with a specialization on the Middle East.

== Education ==
Kern received his Bachelor of Arts in Near Eastern Studies from Princeton University in 1972. During his undergraduate studies, he also attended the University of Riyadh from 1970 to 1971 as the first non-Arab student.

== Career ==
Nat Kern is an acknowledged expert on Middle Eastern oil affairs, with a particular emphasis on the Persian Gulf. Besides directing and writing the firm's analyses and reports, he also has managerial responsibility for the firm's other senior professionals. He has had a variety of hands-on experience in the region and has traveled widely throughout it.

Kern has been a featured speaker on Middle East energy matters at numerous industry conferences in Washington, D.C., London, Riyadh, New York City, Calgary, Dallas, Houston, and Tokyo. He was also co-editor of "Petroleum Politics" in the early 1990s, a quarterly publication which provided an in-depth analysis of world oil markets. He has been featured on many U.S. and Arab news broadcasting channels, interviewed by both international and national newspapers, and has written for a variety of political and oil industry publications.

== Work on Iraq ==
Kern was a frequent visitor to Iraq during the 1980–1988 Iran–Iraq War, at a time when U.S.–Iraq relations were improving, and was tasked by the U.S. government with maintaining ties with certain key Iraqi officials from 1991 onwards, at a time when the U.S. government maintained a policy of shunning any official contact with the Iraqi government.

He has written extensively for a variety of publications on the future of Iraqi oil production following the invasion of Kuwait, correctly anticipating that Saddam would remain in power and that sanctions would continue for more than a decade thereafter. Prior to the 2003 invasion of Iraq he provided detailed analysis of the difficulties the U.S. would face in the post-invasion phase and of the dire state of the Iraqi oil industry, while his firm pinpointed the consequences of major decisions made by the Coalition Provisional Authority, which are now, but were not at the time, credited with contributing to the failure to achieve post-war stability.

Kern continues to write on Iraqi political developments as well as on the status of Iraq's oil industry.

== Work on Saudi Arabia ==
Kern has organized a series of senior-level U.S. delegations to Saudi Arabia since 2000.

Beginning in 1997, he worked closely with the Government of Saudi Arabia in laying the groundwork for the Saudi Gas Initiative aimed at opening Saudi Arabia’s hydrocarbon resources to foreign investment. He also worked with the U.S. companies participating in the subsequent proposals on developing major gas projects. Kern's role in the Initiative is documented in David Ottaway's new book, The King's Messenger.

In the late 1970s and 1980s, Kern worked with major contractors from around the world in responding to tenders for the supply of power generation and water desalination equipment to the Saline Water Conversion Corporation (SWCC) of Saudi Arabia. He accompanied the then-Governor of SWCC on a visit to Japan in 1975 to encourage Japanese shipyards, then suffering from a lack of tanker-building business in the wake of constrained oil demand, to enter into the business of manufacturing large-scale, multi-stage flash desalination plants. In 1977, he assisted Hitachi Zosen in negotiating a technical assistance and patent license agreement with Westinghouse Electric for MSF desalination technology, and subsequently in winning major contracts. In the early 1990s, he assisted U.S. companies in settling contractual disputes with the Saudi Government, including Westinghouse’s claims on Gas Turbine power plants in Ha'il and Qassim.
