= Kerns (surname) =

Kerns is a German surname of several possible origins. Notable people with the surname include:

- Brian D. Kerns (born 1957), former US representative from Indiana
- George M. Kerns (1871–1941), architect
- Joanna Kerns, (born 1953), American actress and director
- John Kerns, (1923–1988), Canadian football player
- Krayton Kerns (born 1957), Montana state legislator
- Lloyd Kerns (1921–1986) Ohio state legislator
- Sandra Kerns (born 1949), American actress
- Todd Kerns (born 1969), Canadian musician

== See also ==
- Kern (surname)
