= Černé Voděrady =

- Municipality
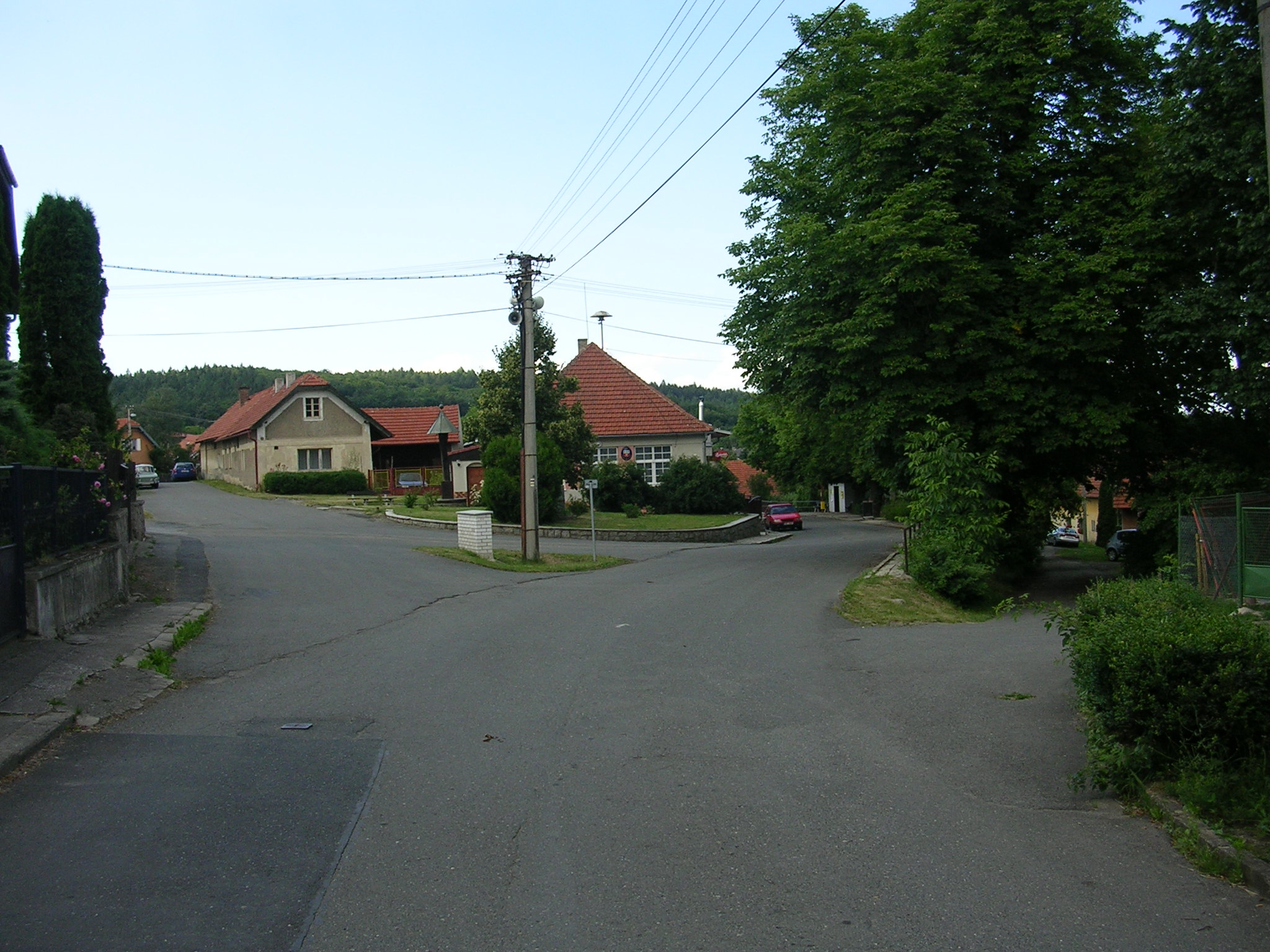
- Centre of Černé Voděrady

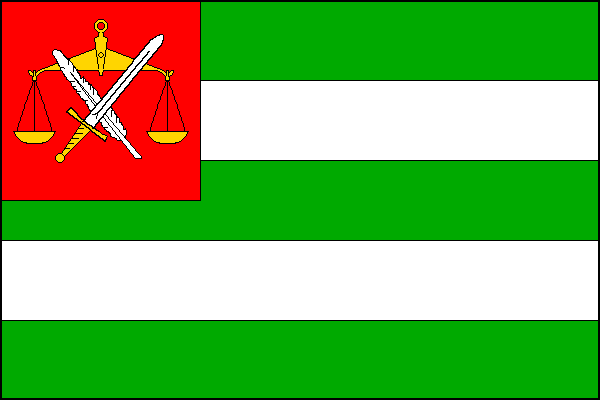
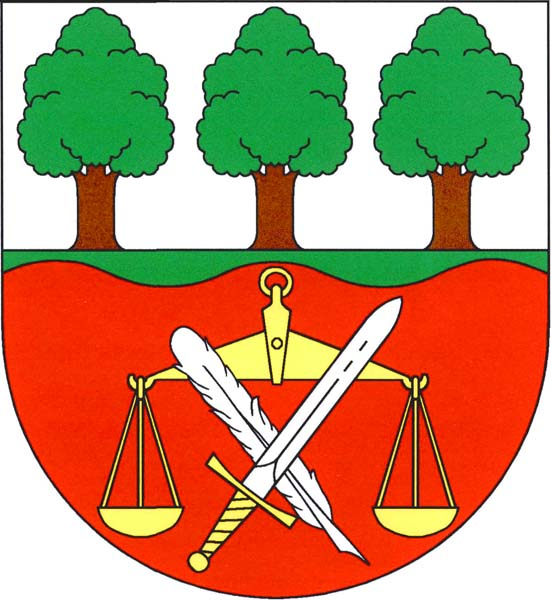
- Flag Coat of arms

- Location in the Czech Republic
- Coordinates: 49°56′30″N 14°48′25″E
- Country: Czech Republic
- Region: Central Bohemian
- District: Prague-East
- First mentioned: 1291

Area
  - Total: 13.14 km^{2} (5.07 sq mi)
- Elevation: 425 m (1,394 ft)

Population (2026-01-01)
  - Total: 385
  - Density: 29.3/km^{2} (75.9/sq mi)
- Time zone: UTC+1 (CET)
  - Summer (DST): UTC+2 (CEST)
- Postal code: 281 63
- Website: www.cernevoderady.cz

Černé Voděrady is a municipality and village in Prague-East District in the Central Bohemian Region of the Czech Republic. It has about 400 inhabitants.

== History ==
The first written mention of Černé Voděrady is from 1291.

== Demographics ==
Historical population
Year	Pop.	±%
1869	526	—
1880	576	+9.5%
1890	563	−2.3%
1900	548	−2.7%
1910	567	+3.5%
1921	517	−8.8%
1930	442	−14.5%
1950	370	−16.3%
1961	319	−13.8%
1970	314	−1.6%
1980	304	−3.2%
1991	272	−10.5%
2001	281	+3.3%
2011	362	+28.8%
2021	380	+5.0%
Source: Censuses
