= The CERN Foundation =

Collaborative Ependymoma Research Network
- Abbreviation: CERN
- Formation: 2006
- Type: Nonprofit
- Purpose: Develop new treatments for Ependymoma
- Headquarters: Dayton, Ohio, USA
- Founder: Mark Gilbert, M.D.
- Website: www.cern-foundation.org

The Collaborative Ependymoma Research Network (CERN) Foundation is a nonprofit organization composed of scientists and adult and pediatric cancer researchers who work together to develop new treatments for ependymoma, a type of primary brain or spinal cord tumor that occurs in both children and adults, and improve the outcomes and care of patients. The organization is headquartered in Dayton, Ohio, USA.

The CERN Foundation’s research is based on a model that includes preclinical evaluation of new and FDA-approved drugs in laboratory models of ependymoma. The drugs are tested in clinical trials involving both pediatric and adult cancer centers from within the CERN network. The CERN Foundation’s research has been used to design better treatment plans for patients with ependymoma.

== History ==
In November 2006, the concept of creating an international group to develop new treatments for ependymoma was proposed to Mark Gilbert, Deputy Chairman of Neuro-Oncology at MD Anderson Cancer Center, during a meeting with an ependymoma survivor.

Shortly thereafter, Gilbert was joined by Richard Gilbertson and Amar Gajjar of St. Jude Children’s Research Hospital, and Ken Aldape and Terri Armstrong of the University of Texas MD Anderson Cancer Center. After the organization created its initial vision and established its leadership, additional partners joined the CERN team. Today, investigators representing many internationally recognized cancer centers are partnered with the CERN Foundation.

On April 19, 2012, the CERN Foundation commemorated the first Ependymoma Awareness Day in Houston with a mass butterfly release.

== Research ==
=== Research Projects ===
CERN leads five research projects to discover new treatments for ependymoma.

1. Clinical Trials – CERN Foundation clinical trials test the efficacy of novel treatment approaches for ependymoma. This project serves as a testing ground for new diagnostic and drug discoveries made in Projects Two and Three.
2. Tumor Profiling and Pathology – An integrated histology and molecular biology grading system is used to improve the accuracy of ependymoma diagnosis and prognostication. This project seeks to improve the accuracy in the diagnosis of ependymoma and develop the necessary tools to create new assays to study patients undergoing treatment in clinical trials.
3. Developmental Therapeutics – CERN Foundation screens thousands of novel compounds and known drugs as possible new treatments for pediatric and adult ependymoma. These agents are then evaluated in Project Four as whether to be tested in clinical trials.
4. Tumor Stem Cell Laboratory Models – CERN Foundation laboratory scientists seek to understand how normal neural development goes wrong to result in ependymoma. This project provides insights into the origins of ependymoma and leads to new laboratory models for understanding disease biology and treatment.
5. Patient Outcomes – CERN Foundation investigators explore ependymoma epidemiology and the impact on patient function and quality of life with the goal to develop and disseminate information about ependymoma to patients and medical professionals across the world. The project also provides insights into the design of CERN’s future clinical trials, and all CERN trials include evaluation of the impact of the treatment on the patient.

=== Published Research ===
- Predictors of Survival among Pediatric and Adult Ependymoma Cases: A Study Using Surveillance, Epidemiology, and End Results Data from 1973 to 2007. Amirian, ES; Armstrong, TS; Aldape, KD; Gilbert, MR; Scheurer, ME. Neuroepidemiology, July 2012.
- Current Treatment Options for Pediatric and Adult Patients With Ependymoma. Wright, KD; Gaijjar, A. Current Treatment Options in Oncology, July 2012.
- Prognostic gene expression signature in infratentorial ependymoma. Collaborative Ependymoma Research Network. Acta Neuropathologica, May 2012
- An Integrated In Vitro and In Vivo High-Throughput Screen Identifies Treatment Leads for Ependymoma. Atkinson, JM; Shelat, AA; Carcaboso, AM; Kranenburg, TA.; Arnold, LA; Boulos, N; Wright, K; Johnson, RA; Poppleton, H; Mohankumar, KM; Feau, C; Phoenix, T; Gibson, P; Zhu, L; Tong, Y; Eden, C; Ellison, DW; Priebe, W; Koul, D; Yung, WKA; Gajjar, A; Stewart, CF; Guy, K; Gilbertson, RJ. Cancer Cell, September 2011.
- Establishment and characterization of clinically relevant models of ependymoma: a true challenge for targeted therapy. Guan, S; Shen, R; Lafortune, T; Tiao, N; Houghton, P; Yung, WK: Koul, D. Neuro-Oncology, July 2011
- Clinical course of adult patients with ependymoma: results of the Adult Ependymoma Outcomes Project. Armstrong, TS; Vera-Bolanos, E; Gilbert, MR. Cancer, November 2011.
- Symptom Profiles in Adult patients with Ependymoma: Report from the Ependymoma Outcomes Project. Acquaye, A; Vera-Bolamos, E; Armstrong, TS; Nebiyou Bekele, B; Gilbert, MR.
- Cross-species genomics matches driver mutations and cell compartments to model ependymoma. Johnson, RA; Wright, K; Poppleton, H; Mohankumar, KM; Finkelstein, D; Pounds, SB; Rand, V; Leary, SES; White, E; Eden, C; Hogg, T; Northcott, P; Mack, S; Neale, G; Wang, Y; Coyle, B; Atkinson, J; DeWire, M; Kranenburg, TA; Gillespie, Y; Allen, JC; Merchant, T; Boop, FA; Sanford, RA; Gajjar, A. Nature, July 2010
- Adult ependymal tumors: prognosis and the M.D. Anderson Cancer Center experience. Armstrong, TS; Vera-Bolanos, E; Nebiyou Bekele, B; Aldape, K; Gilbert, MR. Neuro-Oncology, August 2010
- Ependymomas of the adult: molecular biology and treatment. Ruda, R; Gilbert, M; Soffietti, R. Current Opinions in Neurology, December 2008

== CERN Network ==
The CERN Foundation is led by investigators at two cancer centers in the United States: MD Anderson Cancer Center in Houston, Texas, and St. Jude Children’s Research Hospital in Memphis, Tennessee. These institutions are supported by the collaborative efforts of other national and international cancer centers where clinical trials can be accessed.

=== CERN Centers for Children ===
- Children’s Hospital of Chicago, Chicago, Illinois
- Children's Hospital of Colorado, Aurora, Colorado
- Children's Hospital Los Angeles, Los Angeles, California
- Children’s National Medical Center, Washington, D.C.
- Cincinnati Children’s Hospital Medical Center, Cincinnati, Ohio
- Memorial Sloan-Kettering Cancer Center, New York, New York
- St. Jude Children's Research Hospital, Memphis, Tennessee
- Stanford Hospital and Clinic, Palo Alto, California
- The Hospital for Sick Children (Sick Kids), Toronto, Ontario
- The University of Texas M.D. Anderson Cancer Center, Houston, Texas

=== CERN Centers for Adults ===
- Assistance Publique - Hospitaux de Marseille, Marseille, France
- Dana-Farber and Harvard Cancer Center, Boston, Massachusetts
- DKFZ German Cancer Research Center, Heidelberg, Germany
- Henry Ford Hospital, Detroit, Michigan
- Mayo Clinic, Rochester, Minnesota
- Memorial Sloan-Kettering Cancer Cente, New York, New York
- The University of Texas M.D. Anderson Cancer Center, Houston, Texas
- University of California San Francisco, San Francisco, California
- University of Pittsburgh Medical Center, Pittsburgh, Pennsylvania
- University of Torino, Torino, Italy
- University of Utah Huntsman Cancer Institute, Salt Lake City, Utah
- University of Wisconsin Paul P. Carbone Comprehensive Cancer Center, Madison, Wisconsin

== Fundraising ==
The CERN Foundation is a private foundation. The majority of funding comes from donations by individuals and organizations.

=== Events ===
==== Ependymoma Awareness Day ====
The CERN Foundation established the first Ependymoma Awareness Day on April 19, 2012, with a butterfly release. The CERN Foundation supporters purchased butterflies for the release and proceeds went to help fund the organization. The Foundation will be hosted the second annual Ependymoma Awareness Day on April 18, 2013.
