= Diocese of Salisbury =

Diocese of the Church of England

Coordinates: 51.065°N 1.798°W

Diocese of Salisbury Dioecesis Sarisberiensis
- Coat of arms

- Flag

Location
- Country: England; Jersey; Guernsey
- Ecclesiastical province: Canterbury
- Archdeaconries: Dorset, Sarum, Sherborne, Wilts
- Headquarters: Salisbury

Statistics
- Parishes: 459
- Churches: 582

Information
- Denomination: Church of England
- Cathedral: Salisbury Cathedral
- Language: English

Current leadership
- Bishop: Stephen Lake, Bishop of Salisbury
- Suffragans: Karen Gorham, Bishop of Sherborne; Bishop of Ramsbury (vacant)
- Archdeacons: Penny Sayer, Archdeacon of Sherborne; Louise Ellis, Archdeacon of Wilts; Archdeacon of Dorset (vacant); Archdeacon of Sarum (vacant)

Website
- www.salisbury.anglican.org

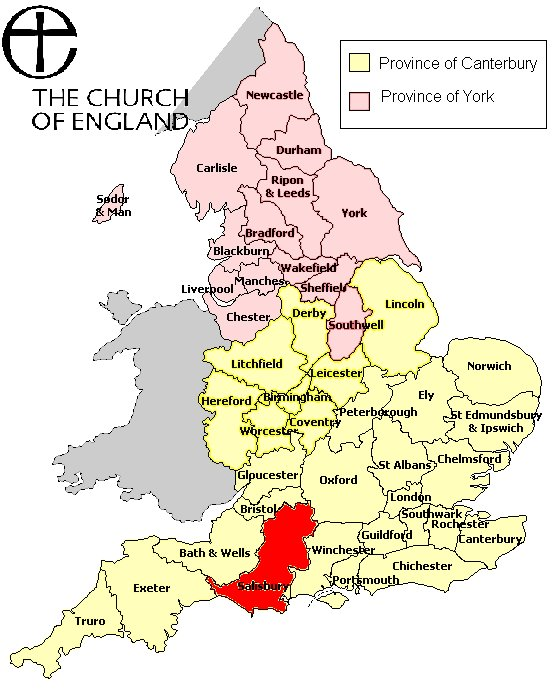
Map of the dioceses of the Church of England showing Salisbury diocese in red

The Diocese of Salisbury is a Church of England diocese in the south of England, within the ecclesiastical Province of Canterbury. The diocese covers the historic county of Dorset (which excludes the deaneries of Bournemouth and Christchurch, which fall within the Diocese of Winchester as they were historically in Hampshire), most of Wiltshire (excepting an area in the north and Swindon), and the Channel Islands of Jersey and Guernsey. The diocese is led by Stephen Lake, Bishop of Salisbury, and by the diocesan synod. The bishop's seat is at Salisbury Cathedral.

== History ==
=== Catholic ===
The Diocese of Sherborne (founded c. AD 705) was the origin of the present diocese; St Aldhelm was its first Bishop of Sherborne. The Diocese of Ramsbury was created from the northwestern territory of the Bishop of Winchester in 909.

Herman of Wilton was appointed bishop of Ramsbury, covering Wiltshire and Berkshire, by Edward the Confessor in 1045. In or after 1059 he was also appointed Sherborne, covering Dorset, uniting the two dioceses. In 1075 he obtained approval to move the see to Old Sarum. Disputes between the bishops Herbert and Richard Poore and the sheriffs of Wiltshire led to the removal of the see in the 1220s to a new site. This was chartered as the city of New Sarum by King Henry III in 1227, but it was not until the 14th century that the office was described (by Robert Wyvil) as the Bishop of Sarum (episcopus Sarum). The diocese, like the city, is now known as Salisbury. The archdeaconry around Salisbury, however, retains the name of Sarum.

=== Anglican ===
Reforms within the Church of England led to the annexation of Dorset from the abolished diocese of Bristol in 1836; Berkshire, however, was removed the same year and given to Oxford.

In 1925 and 1974, new suffragan bishops were appointed to assist the Bishop of Salisbury; the new offices were titled the bishops of Sherborne and Ramsbury, respectively. Until 2009 the bishops operated under an episcopal area scheme established in 1981, with each suffragan bishop having a formal geographical area of responsibility, and being known as "area bishops". The Bishop of Ramsbury had oversight of the diocese's parishes in Wiltshire, while the Bishop of Sherborne had oversight of the diocese's parishes in Dorset. This scheme was replaced to reflect the increased working across the whole diocese by all three bishops; the two suffragans may now legally function anywhere in the diocese, and the Bishop of Salisbury may delegate any of his functions to them.

The diocese is also divided into four archdeaconries, two for each county. These are further subdivided into deaneries and parishes. Changes were made to the allocation of parishes to deaneries in 1951.

In 2022, the deaneries of Guernsey and Jersey were transferred to the diocese from Winchester, in accordance with the Channel Islands Measure 2020.

== Bishops ==
The diocesan Bishop of Salisbury is assisted across the diocese by two suffragans – the Bishop of Sherborne and the Bishop of Ramsbury. The provincial episcopal visitor (since February 2023), for traditional Anglo-Catholic parishes in this diocese who have petitioned for alternative episcopal oversight is Paul Thomas, Bishop suffragan of Oswestry.

There are several former bishops licensed as honorary assistant bishops in the diocese:

- 2011–present: David Hallatt, retired area Bishop of Shrewsbury, lives in Salisbury.
- Additionally, Peter Price, Bishop of Bath and Wells retired to Gillingham, Dorset in 2013; and Bill Ind, retired Bishop of Truro and Bishop suffragan of Grantham, lives in Melksham; there has been no announcement that either has been made an honorary assistant bishop.

== Sarum Use ==
The Sarum Rite (more properly called Sarum Use) was a variant of the Roman Rite widely used for the ordering of Christian public worship, including the Mass and the Divine Office. It was established by Saint Osmund, Bishop of Salisbury in the 11th century and was originally the local form used in the Cathedral and Diocese of Salisbury; it later became prevalent throughout southern England and came to be used throughout most of England, Wales, Ireland and later Scotland until the reign of Queen Mary. Although abandoned after the 16th century, it was also a notable influence on the pattern of Anglican liturgy represented in the Book of Common Prayer. Occasional interest in and attempts at restoration of the liturgy by Anglicans and Catholics have not produced a general revival, however.

== Archdeaconries and deaneries ==
There are twenty-one deaneries within the diocese.

- Archdeaconry of Wilts
  - Deanery of Bradford
  - Deanery of Calne
  - Deanery of Devizes
  - Deanery of Marlborough
  - Deanery of Pewsey
- Archdeaconry of Sarum
  - Deanery of Alderbury
  - Deanery of Chalke
  - Deanery of Heytesbury
  - Deanery of Salisbury
  - Deanery of Stonehenge
- Archdeaconry of Dorset
  - Deanery of Milton and Blandford
  - Deanery of Poole
  - Deanery of Purbeck
  - Deanery of Wimborne
- Archdeaconry of Sherborne
  - Deanery of Blackmore Vale
  - Deanery of Dorchester
  - Deanery of Lyme Bay
  - Deanery of Sherborne
  - Deanery of Weymouth and Portland
- Deanery of Guernsey
- Deanery of Jersey

== Churches ==
=== Not in a deanery ===
- Cathedral Church of the Blessed Virgin Mary, Salisbury

=== Deanery of Alderbury ===
- Clarendon Churches
  - Alderbury: St Mary the Virgin
  - East Grimstead: Holy Trinity
  - Farley: All Saints
  - Pitton: St Peter
  - West Dean: St Mary the Virgin
  - West Grimstead: St John
  - Whiteparish: All Saints
  - Winterslow: All Saints
  - Winterslow: St John the Baptist
- Bourne Valley Churches
  - Boscombe: St Andrew
  - Cholderton: St Nicholas
  - Newton Tony: St Andrew
  - Porton: St Nicholas
  - Winterbourne Earls: St Michael & All Angels
  - Winterbourne Gunner: St Mary
- Forest and Avon Team
  - Bramshaw: St Peter
  - Downton: St Laurence
  - Landford: St Andrew
  - Morgan's Vale: St Birinus
  - Plaitford: St Peter
  - Redlynch: St Mary

=== Deanery of Blackmore Vale ===
- Hazelbury Bryan and the Hillside Parishes
  - Belchalwell: St Aldhelm
  - Fifehead Neville: All Saints
  - Hazelbury Bryan: St Mary & St James
  - Ibberton: St Eustace
  - Mappowder: St Peter & St Paul
  - Woolland Parish Church
- Stour Vale Churches
  - Buckhorn Weston: St John the Baptist
  - East Stour: Christ Church
  - Fifehead Magdalen: St Mary Magdalene
  - Kington Magna: All Saints
  - Stour Provost: St Michael & All Angels
  - Todber: St Andrew
  - West Stour: St Mary
- Okeford Benefice
  - Childe Okeford: St Nicholas
  - Hammoon: St Paul
  - Manston: St Nicholas
  - Okeford Fitzpaine: St Andrew
  - Shillingstone: Holy Rood
- Shaftesbury Team
  - Compton Abbas: St Mary the Virgin
  - Enmore Green: St John the Evangelist
  - Margaret Marsh: St Margaret
  - Melbury Abbas: St Thomas
  - Motcombe: St Mary
  - Shaftesbury: St James
  - Shaftesbury: St Peter
  - West Orchard: St Luke
- Gillingham etc
  - Gillingham: St Mary the Virgin
  - Langham: St George
  - Milton-on-Stour: St Simon & St Jude
  - Silton: St Nicholas
- Sturminster Newton etc
  - Hinton St Mary: St Peter
  - Lydlinch: St Thomas a Beckett
  - Sturminster Newton: St Mary
- Marnhull
  - Marnhull: St Gregory
- Spire Hill
  - Purse Caundle: St Peter
  - Stalbridge: St Mary
  - Stock Gaylard: St Barnabas
  - Stourton Caundle: St Peter
  - King's Stag Memorial Chapel

=== Deanery of Bradford ===
- Atworth with Shaw and Whitley
  - Atworth: St Michael & All Angels
  - Shaw: Christ Church
- North Bradford on Avon and Villages
  - Bradford-on-Avon: Christ Church
  - Monkton Farleigh: St Peter
  - South Wraxall: St James
  - Winsley: St Nicholas
- Bradford Trinity, Westwood and Wingfield
  - Bradford-on-Avon: Holy Trinity
  - Westwood: St Mary the Virgin
  - Wingfield: St Mary
- Faith in Our Village
  - Broughton Gifford: St Mary the Virgin
  - Great Chalfield: All Saints
  - Holt: St Katharine
- Canalside Parishes
  - Hilperton Marsh: St Mary Magdalene
  - Hilperton: St Michael & All Angels
  - Semington: St George
  - Whaddon: St Mary the Virgin
- Melksham Team
  - Melksham: St Andrew
  - Melksham: St Barnabas
  - Melksham: St Michael & All Angels
- Three in One Benefice
  - North Bradley: St Nicholas
  - Southwick: St Thomas
  - Steeple Ashton: St Mary the Virgin
- Studley
  - Studley: St John the Evangelist
- Trowbridge St James
  - Trowbridge: St James
  - Keevil: St Leonard
- Trowbridge St Thomas
  - Trowbridge: St Thomas the Apostle
  - Trowbridge: Holy Trinity
  - West Ashton: St John the Evangelist
  - Kingfisher Church, Castle Mead (meets in school)

=== Deanery of Calne ===
- Marden Vale Team
  - Blackland: St Peter
  - Bremhill: St Martin
  - Calne: Holy Trinity
  - Calne: St Mary the Virgin
  - Derry Hill: Christ Church
  - Foxham: St John the Baptist
- Lyneham and Woodhill
  - Bradenstoke: St Mary
  - Broad Town: Christ Church
  - Clyffe Pypard: St Peter
  - Hilmarton: St Lawrence
  - Lyneham: St Michael
  - Tockenham: St Giles
- Oldbury Benefice
  - Calstone Wellington: St Mary the Virgin
  - Cherhill: St James the Great
  - Compton Bassett: St Swithin
  - Heddington: St Andrew
  - Yatesbury: All Saints
- Royal Wootton Bassett
  - Wootton Bassett: St Bartholomew & All Saints

=== Deanery of Chalke ===
- Chalke Valley Churches
  - Alvediston: St Mary
  - Berwick St John: St John the Baptist
  - Bishopstone: St John the Baptist
  - Bowerchalke: Holy Trinity
  - Britford: St Peter
  - Broad Chalke: All Saints
  - Charlton All Saints: All Saints
  - Coombe Bisset: St Michael & All Angels
  - Ebbesbourne Wake: St John the Baptist
  - Fifield Bavant: St Martin
  - Homington: St Mary the Virgin
  - Nunton: St Andrew
  - Odstock: St Mary
- Nadder Valley Churches
  - Ansty: St James
  - Barford St Martin: St Martin
  - Baverstock: St Editha
  - Chicklade: All Saints
  - Chilmark: St Margaret of Antioch
  - Compton Chamberlayne: St Michael
  - Dinton: St Mary
  - Fonthill Bishop: All Saints
  - Fonthill Gifford: Holy Trinity
  - Fovant: St George
  - Hindon: St John the Baptist
  - Sutton Mandeville: All Saints
  - Swallowcliffe: St Peter
  - Teffont Evias: St Michael
  - Teffont Magna: St Edward the Martyr
  - Tisbury: St John the Baptist
- West Downland Churches
  - Damerham: St George
  - Martin: All Saints
  - Rockbourne: St Andrew
  - Whitsbury: St Leonard
- St Bartholomew Benefice
  - Charlton: St John the Baptist
  - Donhead St Andrew: St Andrew
  - Donhead St Mary: St Mary the Virgin
  - East Knoyle: St Mary
  - Sedgehill: St Catherine
  - Semley: St Leonard
- Wilton Parish
  - Fugglestone: St Peter
  - Netherhampton: St Catherine
  - Wilton: St Mary & St Nicholas

=== Deanery of Devizes ===
- All Cannings: All Saints
- Bishop's Cannings: St Mary the Virgin
- Bishop's (West) Lavington: All Saints
- Bratton: St James the Great
- Bromham: St Nicholas
- Bulkington: Christ Church
- Chirton: St John the Baptist
- Coulston: St Thomas of Canterbury
- Devizes: St John the Baptist
- Devizes: St Mary
- Devizes: St Peter
- Easterton: St Barnabas
- Edington: St Mary, St Katharine & All Saints
- Erlestoke: Holy Saviour
- Etchilhampton: St Andrew
- Great Cheverell: St Peter
- Little Cheverell: St Peter
- Marden: All Saints
- Market Lavington: St Mary of the Assumption
- Potterne: St Mary the Virgin
- Poulshot: St Peter
- Rowde: St Matthew
- Sandy Lane: St Mary & St Nicholas
- Seend: Holy Cross
- Southbroom: St James
- Stert: St James
- Urchfont: St Michael & All Angels
- Wilsford: St Nicholas
- Worton: Christ Church

=== Deanery of Dorchester ===
- Alton Pancras: St Pancras
- Bradford Peverell: St Mary
- Broadmayne: St Martin
- Buckland Newton: The Holy Rood
- Cerne Abbas: St Mary
- Charminster: St Mary the Virgin
- Cheselborne: St Martin
- Compton Valence: St Thomas a Beckett
- Crossways: St Aldhelm
- Dewlish: All Saints
- Dorchester: St George
- Dorchester: St Mary the Virgin
- Dorchester: St Peter
- Frampton: St Mary
- Godmanstone: Holy Trinity
- Hilton: All Saints
- Holworth: St Catherine-by-the-Sea
- Melcombe Horsey: St Andrew
- Milborne: St Andrew
- Minterne Magna: St Andrew
- Moreton: St Nicholas
- Owermoigne: St Michael
- Piddlehinton: St Mary the Virgin
- Piddletrenthide: All Saints
- Puddletown: St Mary the Virgin
- Stinsford: St Michael
- Stratton: St Mary the Virgin
- Sydling: St Nicholas
- Tincleton: St John the Evangelist
- Tolpuddle: St John the Evangelist
- Warmwell: Holy Trinity
- West Knighton: St Peter
- West Stafford: St Andrew
- Winterborne Monkton: St Simon & St Jude
- Winterbourne Abbas: St Mary
- Winterbourne Steepleton: St Michael
- Winterbourne: St Martin
- Woodsford: St John the Baptist

=== Deanery of Guernsey ===
- Alderney: St Anne
- Guernsey: Chapel of St Apollonia
- Guernsey: Holy Trinity
- Guernsey: Sainte Marie du Castel
- Guernsey: St André de la Pommeraye
- Guernsey: Ste Marguerite de la Foret
- Guernsey: St John the Evangelist
- Guernsey: St Martin
- Guernsey: St Matthew
- Guernsey: St Michel du Valle
- Guernsey: St Peter Port
- Guernsey: St Philippe de Torteval
- Guernsey: St Pierre du Bois
- Guernsey: St Sampson
- Guernsey: St Saviour
- Guernsey: St Stephen
- St Sampson: l'Islet, St Mary

=== Deanery of Heytesbury ===
- Bishopstrow: St Aldhelm
- Boreham: St John the Evangelist
- Bourton: St George
- Boyton: St Mary the Virgin
- Brixton Deverill: St Michael
- Brokers Wood: All Saints
- Chapmanslade: St Philip & St James
- Codford: St Mary
- Codford: St Peter
- Corsley: St Margaret of Antioch
- Dilton Leigh: Holy Saviour
- Dilton Marsh: Holy Trinity
- Heytesbury: St Peter & St Paul
- Horningsham: St John the Baptist
- Kilmington: St Mary the Virgin
- Kingston Deverill: St Mary
- Knook: St Margaret
- Longbridge Deverill: St Peter & St Paul
- Maiden Bradley: All Saints
- Mere: St Michael the Archangel
- Norton Bavant: All Saints
- Sherrington: St Cosmas & St Damian
- Stourton: St Peter
- Sutton Veny: St John the Evangelist
- Tytherington: St James
- Upton Lovell: St Augustine of Canterbury
- Upton Scudamore: St Mary the Virgin
- Warminster: Christ Church
- Warminster: St Denys
- Westbury: All Saints
- West Knoyle: St Mary the Virgin
- Zeals: St Martin

=== Deanery of Jersey ===
- Grouville: St Peter la Roque
- Jersey: All Saints
- Jersey: Holy Trinity
- Jersey: St Andrew
- Jersey: St Aubin (Albinus)
- Jersey: St Brelade (Branwalator)
- Jersey: St Clement
- Jersey: St George
- Jersey: St Helier
- Jersey: St John the Baptist
- Jersey: St Lawrence
- Jersey: St Luke
- Jersey: St Mark
- Jersey: St Martin
- Jersey: St Martin de Grouville
- Jersey: St Martin, Gouray
- Jersey: St Mary
- Jersey: St Matthew
- Jersey: St Nicholas Greve D'Azette
- Jersey: St Ouen (Audoin)
- Jersey: St Paul Chapelry
- Jersey: St Peter
- Jersey: St Saviour
- Jersey: St Simon
- Sark: St Peter
- St Brelade: Communicare Chapel

=== Deanery of Lyme Bay ===
- Allington: St Swithun
- Askerswell: St Michael
- Beaminster & Pilsdon: St. Mary of the Annunciation
- Bettiscombe: St Stephen
- Blackdown: Holy Trinity
- Bothenhampton: Holy Trinity
- Bradpole: Holy Trinity
- Bridport: St Mary
- Broadoak: St Paul
- Broadwindsor: St John the Baptist
- Burstock: St Andrew
- Burton Bradstock: St Mary
- Catherston Leweston: St Mary
- Charmouth: St Andrew
- Chideock: St Giles
- Chilcombe (Dedication unknown)
- Dottery: St Saviour
- Drimpton: St Mary
- Eype: St Peter
- Fishpond: St John the Baptist
- Hawkchurch: St John the Baptist
- Hooke: St Giles
- Little Bredy: St Michael & All Angels
- Litton Cheney: St Mary
- Loders: St Mary Magdalene
- Long Bredy: St Peter
- Lyme Regis: St Michael the Archangel
- Marshwood: St Mary
- Melplash: Christ Church
- Monkton Wyld: St Andrew
- Mosterton: St Mary
- Netherbury: St Mary
- North Poorton: St Mary Magdalene
- Powerstock: St Mary the Virgin
- Puncknowle: St Mary the Blessed Virgin
- Salway Ash: Holy Trinity
- Seaborough: St John
- Shipton Gorge: St Martin
- South Perrott & Chedington: St Mary
- Stanton (Morecombelake): St Gabriel
- Stoke Abbott: St Mary
- Swyre: Holy Trinity
- Symondsbury: St John the Baptist
- Toller Porcorum: St Peter and St Andrew
- Walditch: St Mary
- West Bay: St John the Evangelist
- Whitchurch Canonicorum: St Candida & Holy Cross
- Wootton Fitzpaine (No dedication)

=== Deanery of Marlborough ===
- Aldbourne: St Michael
- Avebury: St James
- Axford: St Michael
- Baydon: St Nicholas
- Broad Hinton: St Peter ad Vincula
- Chilton Foliat: St Mary
- Chisledon with Draycot Folliat: Holy Cross
- East Kennet: Christ Church
- Froxfield: All Saints
- Fyfield: St Nicholas
- Marlborough: St Mary the Virgin
- Mildenhall: St John the Baptist
- Ogbourne: St Andrew
- Ogbourne: St George
- Overton: St Michael & All Angels
- Preshute: St George
- Ramsbury: Holy Cross
- Winterbourne Monkton: St Mary Magdalene
- Winterbourne Bassett: St Katherine

=== Deanery of Milton and Blandford ===
- Almer: St Mary
- Ashmore: St Nicholas
- Blandford Forum: St Peter & St Paul
- Blandford St Mary: St Mary
- Bloxworth: St Andrew
- Charlton Marshall: St Mary the Virgin
- Chettle: St Mary
- Durweston: St Nicholas
- Farnham: St Laurence
- Fontmell Magna: St Andrew
- Gussage: St Andrew
- Iwerne Courtney (or Shroton) : St Mary
- Iwerne Minster: St Mary
- Langton Long: All Saints
- Milton Abbas: St Catherine’s Chapel
- Milton Abbas: St James
- Morden: St Mary
- Pentridge: St Rumbold
- Pimperne: St Peter
- Sixpenny Handley: St Mary
- Spetisbury: St John the Baptist
- Stourpaine: Holy Trinity
- Sturminster Marshall: St Mary
- Sutton Waldron: St Bartholomew
- Tarrant Gunville: St Mary
- Tarrant Hinton: St Mary
- Tarrant Keynston: All Saints
- Tarrant Monkton: All Saints
- Tarrant Rushton: St Mary
- Tollard Royal: St Peter ad Vincula
- Turnworth: St Mary
- Winterborne Clenston: St Nicholas
- Winterborne Houghton: St Andrew
- Winterborne Kingston: St Nicholas
- Winterborne Stickland: St Mary
- Winterborne Whitechurch: St Mary
- Winterbourne Zelstone: St Mary

=== Deanery of Pewsey ===
- Alton Barnes: St Mary the Virgin
- Beechingstoke: St Stephen
- Burbage: All Saints
- Buttermere: St James the Great
- Charlton: St Peter
- Chute: St Nicholas
- Collingbourne Ducis: St Andrew
- Collingbourne Kingston: St Mary
- East Grafton: St Nicholas
- Easton Royal: Holy Trinity
- Great Bedwyn: St Mary
- Ham: All Saints
- Huish: St Nicholas
- Little Bedwyn: St Michael
- Manningford Bruce: St Peter
- Milton Lilbourne: St Peter
- North Newnton: St James
- Oare: Holy Trinity
- Pewsey: St John the Baptist
- Rushall: St Matthew
- Savernake Forest: St Katharine
- Shalbourne: St Michael & All Angels
- Stanton St Bernard: All Saints
- Tidcombe: St Michael
- Upavon: St Mary the Virgin
- Wilcot: Holy Cross
- Woodborough: St Mary Magdalene
- Wootton Rivers: St Andrew

=== Deanery of Poole and North Bournemouth ===
- Brownsea Island: St Mary
- Branksome Park: All Saints
- Branksome: St Aldhelm
- Branksome: St Clement
- Broadstone: St John the Baptist
- Canford Cliffs: The Transfiguration
- Canford Heath: St Paul
- Creekmoor: Christ Church
- Ensbury Park: St Thomas
- Hamworthy: St Gabriel
- Hamworthy: St Michael
- Heatherlands: St John the Evangelist
- Kinson: St Andrew
- Kinson: St Philip
- Lilliput: The Holy Angels
- Longfleet: St Mary
- Lytchett Matravers: St Mary the Virgin
- Lytchett Minster
- Oakdale: St George
- Parkstone: St Luke
- Parkstone: St Peter
- Parkstone: The Good Shepherd
- Poole Missional Communities - Reconnect
- Poole: St James with St Paul
- Sandbanks: St Nicholas
- St Mark's and St Saviour's
  - Talbot Village: St Mark
  - Wallisdown: St Saviour
- Upton: St Dunstan

=== Deanery of Purbeck ===
- Affpuddle: St Laurence
- Arne St Nicholas: St Nicholas
- Bere Regis: St John the Baptist
- Chaldon Herring: St Nicholas
- Church Knowle: St Peter
- Corfe Castle: St Edward the Martyr
- East Holme: St John the Evangelist
- East Lulworth: St Andrew
- Herston: St Mark
- Kimmeridge: St Nicholas of Myra
- Kingston: St James
- Langton Matravers: St George
- Sandford: St Martin
- Steeple: St Michael & All Angels
- Studland: St Nicholas
- Swanage: All Saints
- Swanage: St Mary the Virgin
- Wareham: Lady St Mary
- Wareham: St Martin
- West Lulworth: Holy Trinity
- Winfrith Newburgh: St Christopher
- Wool: Holy Rood
- Worth Matravers: St Aldhelm
- Worth Matravers: St Nicholas

=== Deanery of Salisbury ===
- Bemerton: St Andrew
- Bemerton: St John the Evangelist
- Bemerton: St Michael & All Angels
- Fisherton Anger: St Paul
- Harnham: All Saints
- Harnham: St George
- Laverstock: St Andrew
- Salisbury: St Francis
- Salisbury: St Mark
- Salisbury: St Martin
- Salisbury: St Thomas a Beckett
- Stratford sub Castle: St Lawrence

=== Deanery of Sherborne ===
- Batcombe: St Mary Magdalene
- Beer Hackett: St Michael
- Bishop's Caundle: (Dedication unknown)
- Bradford Abbas: St Mary the Virgin
- Castleton: St Mary Magdalene
- Cattistock: St Peter & St Paul
- Caundle Marsh: St Peter & St Paul
- Chetnole: St Peter
- Chilfrome: Holy Trinity
- Corscombe: St Mary
- East Chelborough: St James
- Evershot: St Osmund
- Folke: St Lawrence
- Frome St Quinton: St Mary
- Frome Vauchurch: St Francis
- Glanvilles Wootton: St Mary the Virgin
- Halstock: St Juthware and St Mary
- Hermitage: St Mary the Virgin
- Hilfield: St Nicholas
- Holnest: Assumption of the Blessed Virgin Mary
- Holwell: St Laurence
- Leigh: St Andrew
- Lillington: St Martin
- Longburton: St James
- Maiden Newton: St Mary
- Melbury Bubb: St Mary the Virgin
- Melbury Osmund: St Osmund
- Nether Compton: St Nicholas
- Oborne: St Cuthbert
- Over Compton: St Michael
- Poyntington: All Saints
- Pulham: St Thomas a Beckett
- Rampisham: St Michael & All Angels
- Ryme Intrinseca: St Hippolytus
- Sandford Orcas: St Nicholas
- Sherborne: Abbey Church of St Mary
- Sherborne: St Paul
- Thornford: St Mary Magdalene
- Trent: St Andrew
- West Chelborough: St Andrew
- Wraxall: St Mary
- Yetminster: St Andrew

=== Deanery of Stonehenge ===
- Amesbury: St Mary & St Melor
- Berwick: St James
- Bulford: St Leonard
- Chitterne: All Saints & St Mary
- Chitterne: St Mary
- Durnford: St Andrew
- Durrington: All Saints
- Enford: All Saints
- Figheldean: St Michael & All Angels
- Fittleton: All Saints
- Great Wishford: St Giles
- Little Langford: St Nicholas of Myra
- Ludgershall: St James
- Milston: St Mary
- Netheravon: All Saints
- Orcheston: St Mary
- Shrewton: St Mary
- South Newton: St Andrew
- Stapleford: St Mary
- Steeple Langford: All Saints
- Stockton: St John the Baptist
- Tidworth: Holy Trinity
- Tilshead: St Thomas a Becket
- Wilsford: St Michael
- Winterborne Stoke: St Peter
- Woodford: All Saints
- Wylye: St Mary the Virgin

=== Deanery of Weymouth and Portland ===
- Abbotsbury: St Nicholas
- Bincombe: Holy Trinity
- Broadwey: St Nicholas
- Buckland Ripers: St Nicholas
- Chickerell: St Mary
- Corton: St Bartholomew
- Fleet: Holy Trinity
- Fleet Old Church
- Langton Herring: St Peter
- Littlemoor: St Francis of Assisi
- Osmington: St Osmond
- Portesham: St Peter
- Portland: All Saints
- Portland: St John the Baptist
- Preston: St Andrew
- Radipole: Emmanuel
- Radipole: St Aldhelm
- Radipole: St Ann
- Southwell: St Andrew
- Upwey: St Laurence
- Weymouth: Holy Trinity
- Weymouth: St John the Evangelist
- Weymouth: St Mary
- Weymouth: St Paul
- Parish of Wyke Regis
  - Wyke Regis: All Saints
  - Weymouth: St Edmund of Canterbury

=== Deanery of Wimborne ===
- Alderholt: St James
- Canford Magna: St Barnabas
- Canford Magna Parish Church
- Canford Magna: The Lantern
- Chalbury: All Saints
- Colehill: St Michael & All Angels
- Corfe Mullen: St Hubert
- Corfe Mullen: St Nicholas of Jerusalem
- Cranborne: St Mary & St Bartholomew
- Edmondsham: St Nicholas
- Ferndown: St Mary
- Gussage: All Saints
- Gussage: St Michael
- Hampreston: All Saints
- Hinton Martel: St John the Evangelist
- Horton: St Wolfrida
- Kingston Lacy: St Stephen
- Shapwick: St Bartholomew
- The Point: Wimborne Deanery
- Three Legged Cross: All Saints
- Verwood: St Michael & All Angels
- West Moors: St Mary the Virgin
- West Parley: All Saints
- West Parley: St Mark
- Wimborne Minster: St Cuthberga
- Wimborne St Giles: St Giles
- Wimborne: St John the Evangelist
- Witchampton: St Mary & Cuthberga & All Saints
- Woodlands: The Ascension

=== Deanery of Jersey ===
Benefice	Churches	Link	Clergy	Ref
Jersey (All Saints)	All Saints, St Helier		Vicar: David Grantham	
Jersey (St Simon)	St Simon, St Helier		Vicar: David Grantham	
Jersey (Holy Trinity)	Holy Trinity, Trinity		Rector: Geoff Houghton	
Jersey (St Andrew)	St Andrew, St Helier		Vicar: Mark Barrett	
Jersey (St Brelade) (Communicare Chapel) (St Aubin)	St Brelade, St Brelade; Fishermen's Chapel; St Aubin on the Hill, St Aubin		Rector: Mark Bond	
Jersey (St Clement)	St Clement, St Clement; St Nicholas, Greve d'Azette		Rector: David Shaw; NSM: Martin Dryden; NSM: Tracy Bromley	
Jersey (St Helier)	St Helier, St Helier		Rector: Michael Keirle (also Dean of Jersey); Curate: James Taylor; NSM: Tony Williams	
Jersey (St John)	St John, St John		Rector: Beverley Sproats	
Jersey (St Lawrence)	St Lawrence, St Lawrence		Rector/Vicar: Phil Warren	
Jersey Millbrook (St Matthew)	St Matthew, Millbrook		Rector/Vicar: Phil Warren	
Jersey (St Luke) St James	St Luke, St Helier		Vicar: Nicholas Barry	
Jersey (St Mark)	St Mark, St Helier		Vicar: Martyn Shea; Curate: Giles Bartleman	
Jersey (St Martin)	St Martin, St Martin		Rector: Geraldine Baudains	
Jersey (St Mary)	St Mary, St Mary		Rector: Vacant	
Jersey (St Ouen) (St George)	St Ouen, St Ouen; St George, St Ouen		Rector: Ian Pallent; NSM: Helen Gunton	
Jersey (St Paul) Proprietary Chapel	St Paul, St Helier		Minister: Paul Brooks	
Jersey (St Peter)	St Peter, St Peter		Rector: Michael Phillips	
Jersey (St Saviour)	St Saviour, St Saviour		Rector: Peter Dyson	
Jersey De Grouville (St Martin) (St Peter La Roque)	St Martin of Tours, Grouville; St Peter la Rocque, La Rocque		Rector: Michael Lange-Smith	
Jersey Gouray (St Martin)	St Martin, Gouray		Vicar: Jeffrey Wattley	

=== Deanery of Guernsey ===
Benefice	Churches	Link	Clergy	Ref
Alderney (St Anne)	St Anne, Alderney		Vicar: Janice Fowler	
Guernsey (Holy Trinity)	Holy Trinity, St Peter Port		Vicar: Jon Honour	
Guernsey (St André De La Pommeraye)	St André De La Pommeraye, St Andrew		Rector/P-in-C: Tim Barker (also Dean of Guernsey); NSM (St André): Juliette Robilliard	
Sark (St Peter)	St Peter, Sark		Rector/P-in-C: Tim Barker (also Dean of Guernsey); NSM (St André): Juliette Robilliard	
Guernsey (St Peter Port)	St Peter, St Peter Port		Vicar: Matthew Barrett; Mission Priest: Peter Graysmith	
Guernsey (St John the Evangelist)	St John the Evangelist, St Peter Port		Vicar: Matthew Barrett; Mission Priest: Peter Graysmith	
Guernsey (St Marguerite De La Foret)	St Marguerite de la Foret, Forest		Rector: Claire Claxton	
Guernsey (St Martin)	St Martin, St Martin		Rector: Daniel Foot	
Guernsey (Ste Marie Du Castel)	St Marie du Castel, Castel		Rector/Vicar: Scott Lamb	
Guernsey (St Matthew) Cobo	St Matthew, Cobo		Rector/Vicar: Scott Lamb	
Guernsey (St Michel Du Valle)	St Michael, Vale		Rector: Stuart Tanswell	
Guernsey (St Philippe De Torteval)	St Philip, Torteval		Rector: Mark Charmley; NSM: Tracy-Belinda Charmley	
Guernsey (St Saviour) (Chapel of St Apolline)	St Saviour, St Saviour; St Apolline's Chapel, St Saviour		Rector: Mark Charmley; NSM: Tracy-Belinda Charmley	
Guernsey (St Pierre Du Bois)	St Pierre du Bois, St Pierre du Bois		Rector: Adrian Datta	
Guernsey (St Sampson)	St Sampson, St Sampson; St Mary, L'Islet (?)		Rector: Vacant	
Guernsey (St Stephen)	St Stephen, St Peter Port		Vicar: John Moore	

== Closed and former churches ==
- St John the Baptist's Church, Allington (closed 2010)
- All Saints Church, Alton Priors (redundant 1972)
- St John's, Athelhampton (redundant 1975)
- Holy Trinity Church, Beaminster (closed 1978)
- St Nicholas's Church, Berwick Bassett (redundant 1972)
- St Leonard's Church, Berwick St Leonard (redundant 1973)
- Borbach Chantry (redundant 1971)
- Holy Trinity Old Church, Bothenhampton (closed 1971)
- St Aldhelm's Church, Boveridge (closed 1980)
- St Laurence's Church, Bradford-on-Avon
- St Andrew's Church, Bridport (closed 1978)
- St John the Baptist, Burcombe (closed 2005)
- Burleston church, now ruined
- St Mary's, Chittoe (converted to house 1986)
- St Mary's Church, Chute Forest (redundant 1972)
- Holy Rood Church, Coombe Keynes (closed 1974)
- All Saints Church, Dorchester (closed 1970)
- Christ Church, Dorchester (closed 1929)
- Holy Trinity Church, Dorchester (closed 1975)
- St Thomas's Church, East Orchard (closed 2018)
- St Peter's Church, Everleigh (redundant 1974)
- St Nicholas's Church, Fisherton Delamere (redundant 1982)
- Holy Trinity, Heywood (closed 1981)
- St Peter's, Highway (redundant 1971)
- All Saints Church, Idmiston (redundant 1977)
- St Giles' Church, Imber (requisitioned 1943)
- St Mary's Church, Long Crichel (closed 2010)
- St Mary's Church, Maddington (redundant 1975)
- All Saints' Church, Manningford Bohune (redundant 1973)
- All Saints' Church, Mapperton (sold to Mapperton House 1977)
- St Peter's, Marlborough (redundant 1974)
- All Saints Church, Nether Cerne (closed 1971)
- Old St Cuthbert's Church, Oborne (redundant 1973)
- St Mary's Church, Old Dilton (redundant 1973)
- Old Sarum Cathedral (dismantled 13th century)
- St George's Church, Orcheston (redundant 1982)
- St Osmund's, Parkstone (closed 2001 and now an Orthodox church)
- St Peter's, Pertwood (redundant 1972)
- St Paul's, Poole (demolished 1963)
- St Andrew's Church, Portland (abandoned c. 1735 and now ruined)
- St George's Church, Portland (closed 1970)
- St Peter's Church, Portland (closed 1973)
- St John the Evangelist, Poxwell (demolished 1969)
- St Andrew's Church, Rollestone (closed 1993)
- St Edmund's, Salisbury (redundant 1974)
- St Mary's Church, South Tidworth (redundant 1972)
- St Paul's, Staverton (closed 2011)
- St Edwold's Church, Stockwood (redundant 1959)
- All Saints, Stoke Wake
- All Saints' Church, Stour Row (closed 2015)
- St Mary & St Lawrence's Church, Stratford Tony (closed 1984)
- St Leonard's Church, Sutton Veny (redundant 1970)
- St Aldhelm's, Swanage (closed 1973)
- St Mary the Virgin, Tarrant Crawford (closed 1988)
- St Mary's, Tarrant Rawston (redundant early 1970s)
- St Mary's Church, Temple, Corsley (closed c. 2010)
- St Mary's Church, Tyneham (requisitioned 1943)
- Christ Church, Weymouth (closed 1939)
- St Martin's Church, Weymouth (closed 1949)
- St Nicholas, Weymouth (closed 2018)
- Whitcombe Church (closed 1971)
- St Mary's Church, Wilton (redundant 1972)
- St Peter's Church, Winterborne Came (redundant 1989)
- St Edward, Winterbourne Dauntsey (demolished 1867)
- St Andrew's Church, Winterborne Tomson (redundant 1972)

== Dedications ==
St Mary (the Virgin) 105 – All Saints 49 – St Andrew 38 – St Peter 38 – St Michael (& All Angels) 36 – St Nicholas 35 – St John the Baptist 25 – Holy Trinity 25 – St James 20 – St Martin 16 – St John the Evangelist 15 – St George 12 – Christ Church 11 – St Lawrence 9 – St Mary Magdalene 9 – St Catherine 7 – Holy Cross/Rood 7 – St Paul 7 – St Aldhelm 6 – SS Peter & Paul 6 – Holy/St Saviour 6 – St Thomas Becket 6 – St Giles 5 – St Margaret 5 – St Barnabas 4 – St Leonard 4 – St Mark 4 – St Matthew 4 – St Stephen 4 – St Thomas 4 – St Bartholomew 3 – St Francis 3 – St Luke 3 – St Osmund 3 – St Anne 2 – St Clement 2 – St Edward the Martyr 2 – St Gabriel 2 – St John (unspecified) 2 – SS Mary & Nicholas 2 – St Peter ad Vincula 2 – St Philip 2 – SS Simon & Jude 2 – St Swithin 2 – All Saints & St Mary 1 – Holy Angels 1 – St Apollonia 1 – Ascension 1 – Assumption of Mary 1 – St Albinus of Angers 1 – St Audoin 1 – St Augustine of Canterbury 1 – St Bartholomew & All Saints 1 – St Birinus 1 – St Branwalator 1 – St Candida & Holy Cross 1 – St Christopher 1 – SS Cosmas & Damian 1 – St Cuthberga 1 – St Cuthbert 1 – St Denys 1 – St Dunstan 1 – St Editha of Wilton 1 – St Edmund of Canterbury 1 – Emmanuel 1 – St Eustace 1 – Good Shepherd 1 – St Gregory 1 – St Helier 1 – St Hippolytus 1 – St Hubert 1 – SS Juthware & Mary 1 – SS Mary & Bartholomew 1 – SS Mary, Cuthberga & All Saints 1 – SS Mary & James 1 – SS Mary, Katherine & All Saints 1 – SS Mary & Melor 1 – St Mary of the Annunciation 1 – St Mary of the Assumption 1 – St Nicholas of Jerusalem 1 – St Pancras 1 – SS Peter & Andrew 1 – SS Philip & James 1 – St Rumbold 1 – St Sampson 1 – St Simon 1 – Transfiguration 1 – St Wolfrida 1 – No dedication 11
