= List of churches in North Dorset =

The following is a list of churches in the former local government area of North Dorset, England.

== List ==
- St Aldhelm's Church, Belchalwell
- St Thomas's Church, East Orchard
- St John's Church, Enmore Green
- St Mary the Virgin, Gillingham, Dorset
- Gillingham Methodist Church
- Church of St Eustace, Ibberton
- St Michael's Church, Over Compton
- St Andrew's Church, Okeford Fitzpaine
- St James' Church, Shaftesbury
- Sherborne Abbey
- St Kenelm's Church, Stanbridge
