= Mary Frances Billington =

English journalist and writer

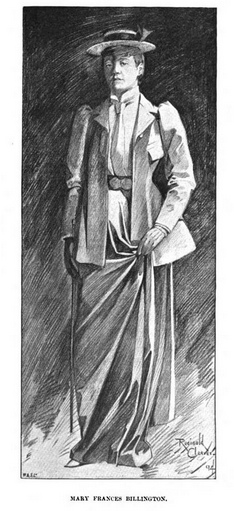
Mary Frances Billington, as portrayed in the frontispiece to Woman in India (1895).

Mary Frances Billington (6 September 1862 – 27 August 1925) was an English journalist and writer, whose collected articles on women were published as Woman in India (1895), The Red Cross in War (1914) and The Roll-Call of Serving Women (1915).

== Early life ==
Mary Frances Billington was born at Chalbury Rectory, in Chalbury, Dorset. Her father, George Henry Billington, was a clergyman, the rector at Chalbury; her mother Frances Anne Barber Billington was a clergyman's daughter before she was a clergyman's wife.

== Career ==
Mary Frances Billington helped establish the Southern Echo newspaper in 1888, and was recruited from there to the London office of the Echo by John Passmore Edwards. Billington joined the staff of the Daily Graphic at its founding in 1890. Some of her journalism during this job included diving underwater in full gear at the Royal Navy Exhibition, and covering the funeral of Alfred, Lord Tennyson at Westminster Abbey. In 1897, she moved to the Daily Telegraph. She was in charge of the women's department at the Telegraph, and wrote a weekly column that focused on women's working lives. Her 28 reports filed with the Graphic from India were compiled as her first book, Woman in India (1895).

During World War I, Billington reported from France, and published two more books of her columns, this time focusing on women's wartime work: The Red Cross in War: Women's Part in the Relief of Suffering (1914) and The Roll Call of Serving Women: A Record of Woman's Work for Combatants and Sufferers in the Great War (1915). In a 1914 article about the war for The Girl's Own Paper, she warned against inexperienced knitters making socks for soldiers, noting, "it is very important that a soldier should not get sore feet."

Billington was one of the founders and president of the Society for Women Journalists from 1913 to 1920, and served on the executive council of the Cowdray Club. She served as the only woman delegate to the 1920 Imperial Press Congress when it was held in Ottawa, Ontario, Canada.

== Personal life ==
Mary Frances Billington died at home in London in 1925, a week short of her 63rd birthday. Her remains were buried at the churchyard in Chalbury, with those of her parents and her brothers.
