= St Peter's Church, Devizes =

Church in Wiltshire, England

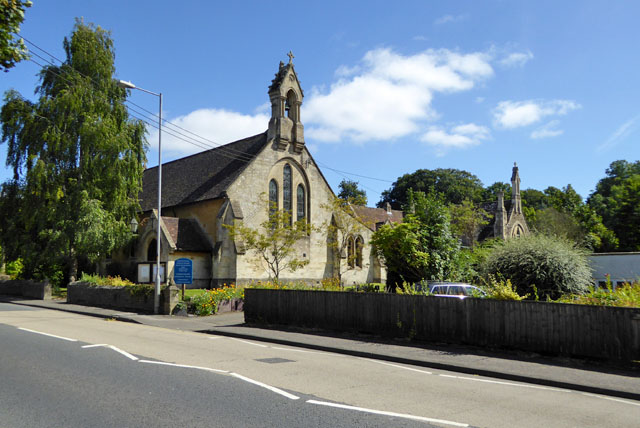
- St Peter's, Devizes, as seen from the Bath Road
- St Peter's Church, Devizes
- 51.354°N 2.006°W
- OS grid reference: ST 99679 61648
- Country: England
- Denomination: Church of England
- Churchmanship: Traditional Anglo-Catholic
- Website: A Church Near You

History
- Status: Active
- Dedication: St. Peter
- Consecrated: 24 July 1866

Architecture
- Functional status: Parish church
- Heritage designation: Grade II listed
- Architect(s): William Slater and Richard Carpenter
- Groundbreaking: 30 June 1865
- Completed: 1866

Administration
- Province: Province of Canterbury
- Diocese: Diocese of Salisbury
- Archdeaconry: Wiltshire
- Parish: Devizes

Clergy
- Bishop: The Rt Revd Paul Thomas SSC (AEO)
- Vicar: Vacant

St Peter's Church is an Anglican parish church in Devizes, Wiltshire. It is a Victorian building and is on the Bath Road, on the western outskirts of the town. One of four Anglican churches in the town, it is in the Anglican Diocese of Salisbury but under the episcopal care of the Bishop of Oswestry. The congregation is a member of Devizes Churches Together.

== History ==
St Peter's Church was built when Rev Benjamin Dowding, Vicar of St James's Church, Devizes, decided that the town needed another church that was nearer to the Kennet and Avon Canal and the industries surrounding it.

The foundation stone was laid on 30 June 1865 by Rev Dowding. The construction took from 1865 to 1866 and was by Slater & Carpenter. The church was consecrated on 24 July 1866 by Walter Kerr Hamilton, Bishop of Salisbury. The consecration service was attended by the Royal Wiltshire Militia who marched to the church with the clergy in procession.

The south aisle and organ chamber were added between 1884 and 1885 by Weaver & Adye.

The first vicar of St Peter's was Rev Harold Grindle. Successive incumbents added to the development of the building and the culture of the parish, notably Canon Frederick Phipps who served for 34 years and introduced the Anglo-Catholic style of worship that continues to this day.

Another former vicar is Rev Douglas Bryant. He was priest of St Peter's for seven years and did much to increase the church's devotional atmosphere. He eventually became a Canon of Guildford Cathedral. His son, Mark Bryant, was Bishop of Jarrow.

In more recent years, St Peter's has become an active member of both Forward in Faith and The Society (Church of England), and the PCC have passed Resolutions A, B and C in opposition to the ordination of women as priests.

== Stations and icons ==
St Peter's has a hand-carved, wooden collection of Stations of the Cross that decorate the walls of the church. It also has a collection of icons, including one of St Paul and one of St Peter, which was given to the church by a former parishioner, Estelle Holloway.

== List of incumbents ==
Priest's Name	From	To
Harold Grindle	1866	1885
Arthur Devas	1885	1901
Frederick Phipps	1901	1935
George F. George	1935	1939
Cyril Reeves Palmer	1939	1941
Sidney Wyman	1941	1944
George Hamilton Douglas	1944	1950
Douglas Bryant	1950	1957
Vernon Thomas	1957	1966
Henry Maude	1966	1974
John Croft	1974	1985
Brian Tigwell	1985	1999
Leslie Attwood	2000	2002
Peter Moss	2005	2013
Vincent Perricone	2014	2020

== Organ ==
The church has a two-manual pipe organ by Griffin and Stroud dating from 1898. A specification of the organ can be found on the National Pipe Organ Register.
