= St Luke's Church, West Orchard =

Church in Dorset, England

St Luke's Church
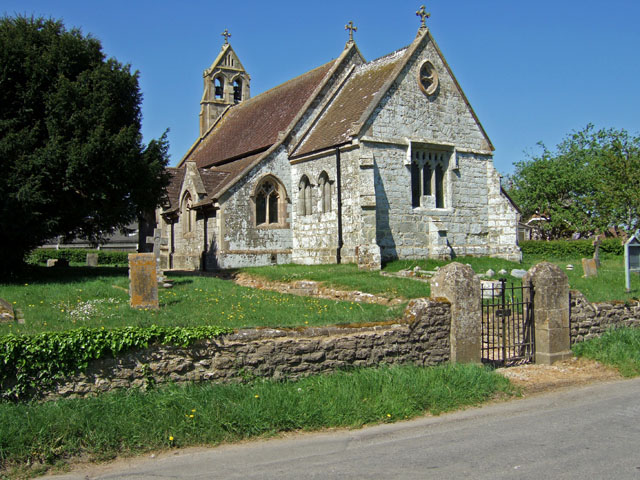

Religion
- Affiliation: Church of England
- Ecclesiastical or organizational status: Active

Location
- Location: West Orchard, Dorset, England
- Interactive map of St Luke's Church
- Coordinates: 50.9470°N 2.2523°W

Architecture
- Architect: Thomas Henry Wyatt
- Type: Church
- Style: Early English

St Luke's Church is a Church of England church in West Orchard, Dorset, England. Most of the church dates to a rebuild of 1876–77 to the designs of Thomas Henry Wyatt, but the chancel is 15th-century. The church is a Grade II listed building.

== History ==
The earlier church at West Orchard was described in the 1859 Post Office Directory of Dorsetshire as a "small Gothic structure". In 1650, it was recorded as being a chapel-of-ease to St Andrew's Church at Fontmell Magna.

In 1876–77, the church was rebuilt at the expense of Lady Westminster and Lord Wolverton. Lady Westminster also donated an adjoining plot of land for an extension of the churchyard. The approximate cost of rebuilding the church was £1,500. Plans were drawn up by Thomas Henry Wyatt of London and Mr. T. B. Miles of Shaftesbury was hired as the builder. The east end of the earlier church was retained to form the chancel. The church reopened with a public dedication on 17 July 1877. An early Holy Communion was held and both Rev. R Lowndes, the Canon of Salisbury Cathedral and rector of Sturminster Newton, and the Archbishop of York, William Thomson, preached during the morning service.

In 1952, West Orchard was transferred to the parish of East Orchard. Repair work was carried out to the church in c. 1958.

== Architecture ==
St Luke's is built of green stone from Semley Hill, with Bath stone dressings. The roofs are covered with Donhead tiles and embellished with stone copings and finials. The church is made up of a nave, north and south aisles, chancel, south porch and north-east vestry. The west end of the church has a double bell-cot of Bath stone. The chancel has been dated to the late 15th century. The east wall of the vestry contains a reinserted 15th-century window of the same design as those in the chancel.

The church's windows are filled with Cathedral glass. The chancel is paved with encaustic tiles from Maw & Co of London and contains a reredos of mosaic work. Many of the fittings are contemporary with the 1876–77 rebuild, including the stone pulpit, the font of Caen stone and the brass lectern. The seats in the nave are of stained and varnished deal, and the choir and chancel seats of carved pitched pine. The altar railing is of oak, on polished brass and iron standards. The churchyard has two fonts by its gate piers; one of round shape, dating to the 12th century, and the other of octagonal shape, dated to the 15th century.
