= Margaret Marsh =

Hamlet in Dorset, England

Coordinates: 50.9674°N 2.2521°W

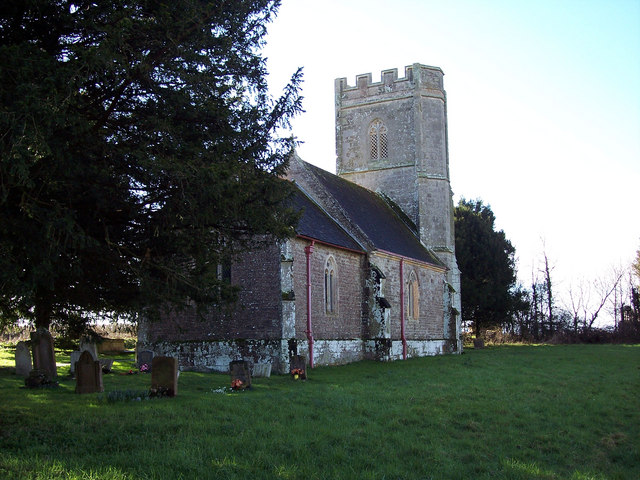
- St Margaret's Church, Margaret Marsh

- Location within Dorset
- Population: 40 (2013 est.)
- OS grid reference: ST823185
- Civil parish: Margaret Marsh
- Unitary authority: Dorset
- Ceremonial county: Dorset
- Region: South West
- Country: England
- Sovereign state: United Kingdom
- Post town: SHAFTESBURY
- Postcode district: SP7
- Dialling code: 01747
- Police: Dorset
- Fire: Dorset and Wiltshire
- Ambulance: South Western
- UK Parliament: North Dorset

Margaret Marsh is a hamlet and civil parish in north Dorset, England. It is situated in the Blackmore Vale, halfway between the towns of Shaftesbury and Sturminster Newton. It is sited on Kimmeridge Clay close to a small tributary stream of the River Stour. In the 2001 census the parish had a population of 60. In 2013 the estimated population of the parish was 40. The parish church has a 15th-century tower and 13th-century font, but the rest of the building was rebuilt in 1873. For local government purposes the parish is grouped with the parishes of East Orchard and West Orchard, to form a Group Parish Council.
