= Chalbury =

Village in Dorset, England

Coordinates: 50.861°N 1.975°W

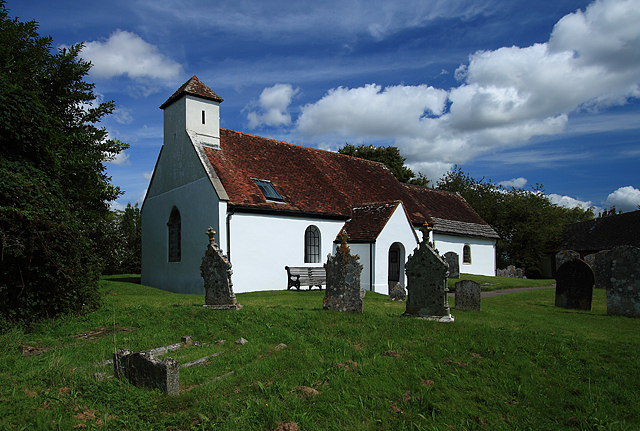
- All Saints Church, Chalbury

- Location within Dorset
- Population: 140
- OS grid reference: SU018068
- Civil parish: Chalbury
- Unitary authority: Dorset
- Ceremonial county: Dorset
- Region: South West
- Country: England
- Sovereign state: United Kingdom
- Post town: WIMBORNE
- Postcode district: BH21
- Dialling code: 01258
- Police: Dorset
- Fire: Dorset and Wiltshire
- Ambulance: South Western
- UK Parliament: North Dorset

Chalbury is a village in the English county of Dorset. It lies on the southern edge of Cranborne Chase within the Dorset unitary authority area of the county, four miles north of Wimborne Minster and four miles west of Verwood. The village is sited on Chalbury Hill, the view from which has been described as "one of the most fascinating in the county". The Dorset broadcaster Ralph Wightman wrote of the hill and its view:

"Here there is a hill which is only three hundred feet high but which manages to give a wonderful view over woodland, heath, fertile chalk and the distant Isle of Wight. This feeling of immense space seen from relatively small hills is a blessed peculiarity of Dorset."

The village has a population of 140 (2001). Journalist Mary Frances Billington was born at Chalbury in 1862, while her father was the rector at All Saints' Church.

== Governance ==
In the UK national parliament, Chalbury is within the North Dorset parliamentary constituency.

After 2019 structural changes to local government in England, Chalbury is part of the Stour and Allen Vale ward which elects 1 member to Dorset Council.
