= Mosterton =

Village in Dorset, England

Coordinates: 50.8463°N 2.7713°W

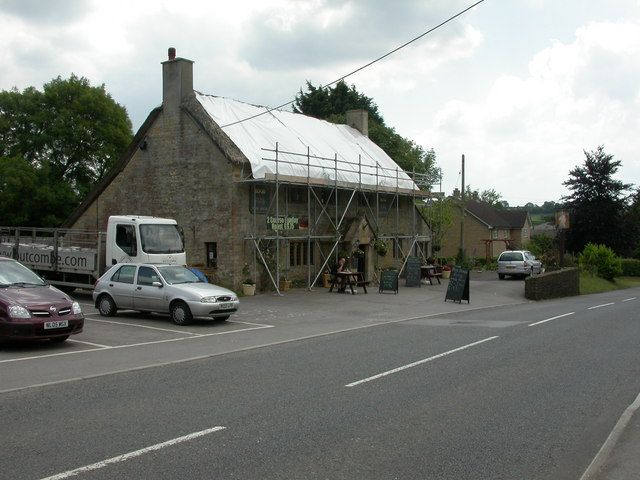
- Admiral Hood pub being rethatched

- Location within Dorset
- Population: 604
- OS grid reference: ST596065
- Unitary authority: Dorset
- Ceremonial county: Dorset
- Region: South West
- Country: England
- Sovereign state: United Kingdom
- Post town: Beaminster
- Postcode district: DT8
- Police: Dorset
- Fire: Dorset and Wiltshire
- Ambulance: South Western
- UK Parliament: West Dorset

Mosterton is a village and civil parish in Dorset, England, situated approximately 3 miles (4.8 km) north of Beaminster. In the 2011 census the parish had a population of 604.

The village's name derives from Old English and means the thorn tree belonging to a man named Mort. In 1086 it was recorded in the Domesday Book as Mortestorne.

Mosterton is a linear settlement, grown along the A3066 road. It lies 2 miles (3.2 km) from Crewkerne railway station across the nearby county boundary in Somerset and is served by a regular bus service from Yeovil to Bridport. It is home of the Admiral Hood pub, Eeles Pottery, the Parrett and Axe Church of England Primary School and St. Mary's Church (Church of England). The village is divided by the River Axe, from which the primary school takes its name (along with the River Parrett that flows through the nearby village of South Perrott).

St Mary's Church was rebuilt on a new site in 1833. The interior of the church is quite understated but does however retain its original fittings. The focus of the church is the stained glass window behind the altar. It was installed in 1975 and includes a combine harvester and a tractor, depicting the farming background of many of the local community.

The Admiral Hood pub is named after Admiral Samuel Hood, 1st Viscount Hood (1724-1816). The pub was rebuilt in its original style after a gutting fire in 1955. Before the reconstruction it was called the New Inn, but on completion it was decided to honour the Hood family who had occupied a Georgian house that was originally on the site of the New Inn, who had a long naval history and whose name has been used on many battleships.

The village also has a village hall which was established as a charity in 1965 when the site was donated by two well-known residents. The hall is run entirely by volunteers. It was donated with the intention of providing space for leisure time occupation, educational and recreational classes and the general well-being of the people of Mosterton.
