= Caundle Marsh =

Village in Dorset, England

Coordinates: 50.919°N 2.461°W

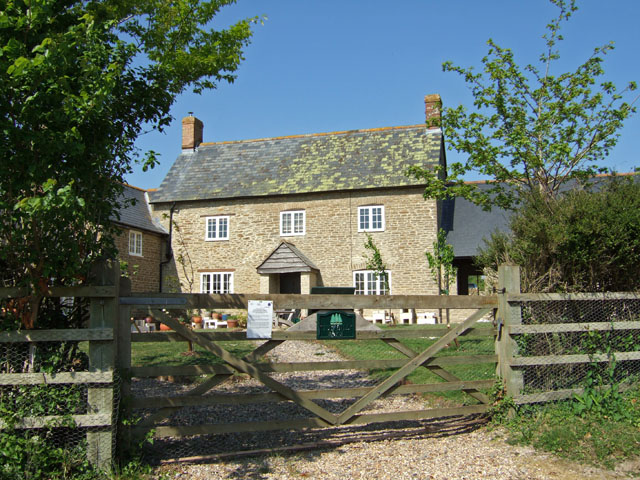
- Tut Hill Farm, Caundle Marsh

- Location within Dorset
- Population: 70
- OS grid reference: ST678133
- Unitary authority: Dorset
- Ceremonial county: Dorset
- Region: South West
- Country: England
- Sovereign state: United Kingdom
- Post town: Sherborne
- Postcode district: DT9
- Police: Dorset
- Fire: Dorset and Wiltshire
- Ambulance: South Western
- UK Parliament: West Dorset

Caundle Marsh is a village and civil parish in northwest Dorset, England, situated in the Blackmore Vale, 4 miles (6.4 km) southeast of Sherborne. The parish includes the hamlet of Tut Hill and the Dorset County Council estimate that in 2013 the population of the parish was 70.

== History ==
The parish was within the hundred of Sherborne until the disuse of the hundred in stages in the late 19th and early 20th centuries. The parish church of Saints Peter and Paul was completed in 1857.
