= Church of St Mary Magdalene, Winterbourne Monkton =

Church in Wiltshire, England

Coordinates: 51.4466°N 1.8608°W

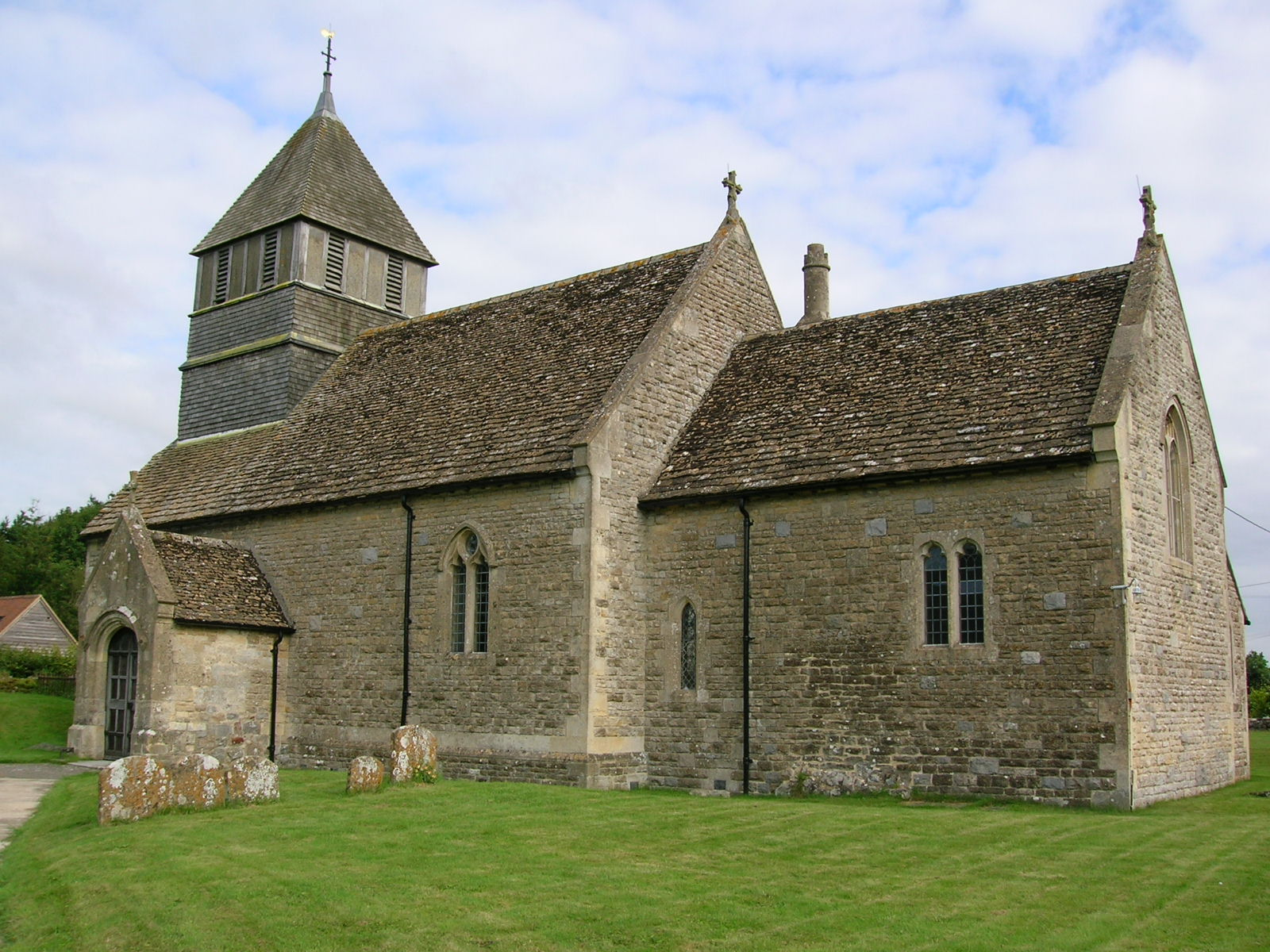
The Church of St Mary Magdalene

The Church of St Mary Magdalene is the Anglican church in the village of Winterbourne Monkton, north of Avebury in Wiltshire, England. It is a 19th-century rebuilding of a structure dating from the 14th century.

== Description ==
The building was begun in the 12th century, with the vicarage being consecrated before 1229. It was attached to Cirencester Abbey and then Avebury. The endowment of the church was considered too small many times during the Middle Ages.

An unusual feature inside the church is two huge tree trunks near the west end which originally supported the bells in the free-standing bell tower. That tower was joined to the chancel by the addition of the nave in the 14th century. There are four bells, three of them cast in the 17th century. The church was restored in 1877–8 by William Butterfield; the work included remodelling the wooden belfry and raising the roofs of the nave and chancel. Julian Orbach, updating Nikolaus Pevsner's description, calls the building "characterful" and writes that "Butterfield's attentions make a serious and coherent interior, still remarkably intact". The building was designated as Grade II listed in 1958.

The circular font is from the 12th century, while the pulpit is from the 17th. The font is decorated in a zigzag style with foliage supported by trumpet scallops. On the northern side is a figure with splayed legs. There is some evidence that the font was originally painted. It has been speculated that the figure, which has three horns or a crown, could be an example of a Sheela na gig although several of its features contradict this suggestion.

== Parish ==
The vicarage was united with Avebury until 1865, when it was instead united with Berwick Bassett; in 1929 the benefice was again united with Avebury, although the parishes remained separate. In 1970 Berwick Bassett was added to the union, and in 1975 a team ministry was established for the wider area. Today the parish of Winterbourne Monkton with Berwick Bassett is part of the Upper Kennet benefice within the Diocese of Salisbury, alongside seven other parishes around Avebury.
