= St Thomas's Church, East Orchard =

Church in East Orchard, Dorset, England

St Thomas's Church
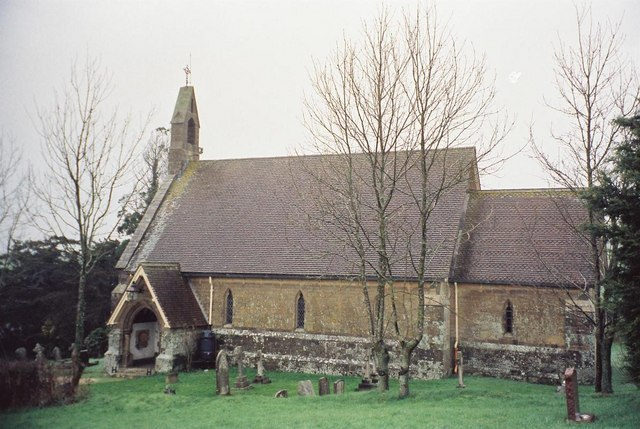
- The church pictured in 1997

Religion
- Affiliation: Anglicanism
- Ecclesiastical or organizational status: defunct

Location
- Location: East Orchard, Dorset, England
- Interactive map of St Thomas's Church
- Coordinates: 50.96050°N 2.23863°W

Architecture
- Type: Church
- Style: Victorian architecture
- Completed: 1859

St Thomas's Church is a Grade II listed building in East Orchard, Dorset. The church dates from 1859. The Diocese of Salisbury discontinued services in 2018, and in 2023 planning permission as granted to turn the church into a residential property.

== See also ==
- List of churches in North Dorset
