= Swyre =

Village and civil parish in Dorset, England

Coordinates: 50.6919°N 2.6699°W

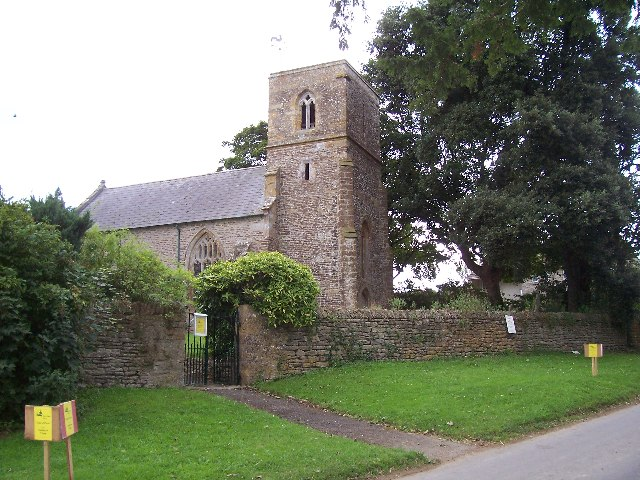
- Parish Church of the Holy Trinity

- Location within Dorset
- Population: 102
- OS grid reference: SY527882
- Unitary authority: Dorset
- Ceremonial county: Dorset
- Region: South West
- Country: England
- Sovereign state: United Kingdom
- Police: Dorset
- Fire: Dorset and Wiltshire
- Ambulance: South Western
- UK Parliament: West Dorset

Swyre ( /swaɪər/) is a small village and civil parish in southwest Dorset, England, situated in a valley beside Chesil Beach 6 miles (9.7 km) southeast of Bridport. In the 2011 census the parish had a population of 102.

The village church is dedicated to the Holy Trinity and was largely rebuilt in 1843, though the west tower and chancel arch date from about 1400. The church contains a memorial to members of the local gentry, namely the families of Napier, Squibb, Gollop and Russell. The Napiers, originally from Scotland, included Sir Robert Napier, Chief Baron of the Irish Exchequer (died 1615) whose descendants became the Napier Baronets of Middlemarsh.

In the 1881 Census, the rector of the church was Orlando Spencer Smith. He lived with his wife, Theodosia, and their two children, along with 4 servants.
