= West Orchard =

Village and civil parish in Dorset, England

Coordinates: 50.9478°N 2.2532°W

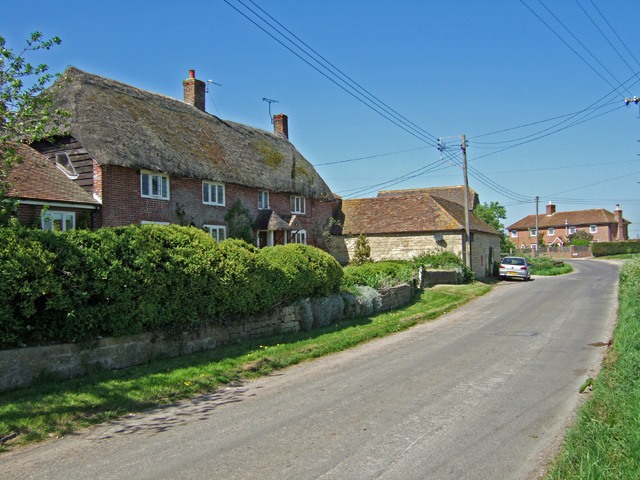
- West Orchard

- Location within Dorset
- Population: 50
- OS grid reference: ST823164
- Civil parish: West Orchard
- Unitary authority: Dorset
- Ceremonial county: Dorset
- Region: South West
- Country: England
- Sovereign state: United Kingdom
- Post town: SHAFTESBURY
- Postcode district: SP7
- Dialling code: 01747
- Police: Dorset
- Fire: Dorset and Wiltshire
- Ambulance: South Western
- UK Parliament: North Dorset

West Orchard is a small village and civil parish in the county of Dorset in southern England. It is situated in the Blackmore Vale in the Dorset administrative district, approximately halfway between the towns of Shaftesbury and Sturminster Newton. It is separated from the adjacent settlement of East Orchard by a stream. In 2013 the civil parish had an estimated population of 50. For local government purposes the parish is grouped with the parishes of East Orchard and Margaret Marsh, to form a Group Parish Council.

St Luke's Church was rebuilt in 1876–77 to the designs of Thomas Henry Wyatt, but the chancel is 15th-century.

== Etymology ==
The name of West Orchard is first attested in a charter of 939 (surviving in a fifteenth-century copy), in the form Archet. The name derives from the Common Brittonic words that survive in modern Welsh as ar ("on") and coed ("wood"), and thus the name once meant "at the wood". Its modern form shows assimilation to the English noun orchard through folk-etymology. The element West was added to the name later when the settlement became distinct from East Orchard.
