= Orcheston =

Village in Wiltshire, England

Coordinates: 51.207°N 1.917°W

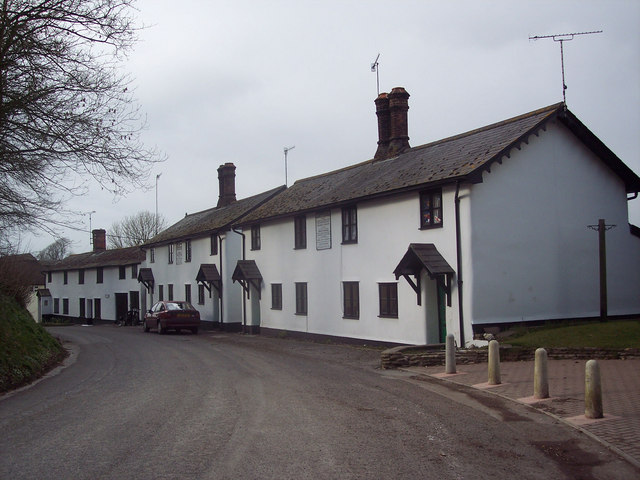
- Flood Cottages, Orcheston

- Location within Wiltshire
- Population: 327 (in 2021)
- OS grid reference: SU059453
- Civil parish: Orcheston
- Unitary authority: Wiltshire
- Ceremonial county: Wiltshire
- Region: South West
- Country: England
- Sovereign state: United Kingdom
- Post town: Salisbury
- Postcode district: SP3
- Dialling code: 01980
- Police: Wiltshire
- Fire: Dorset and Wiltshire
- Ambulance: South Western
- UK Parliament: East Wiltshire
- Website: Parish Council

Orcheston (OR-Chest-ton) is a village and civil parish in Wiltshire, England, lying on Salisbury Plain less than a mile north-west of neighbouring Shrewton. The present-day parish combines the two former parishes of Orcheston St Mary and Orcheston St George and includes the hamlet of Elston. In 2011 the parish had a population of 327.

== History and description ==
The manor is recorded in the 1086 Domesday Book with the spelling Orcestone in three entries and Orchestone in a fourth.

The two civil parishes of Orcheston, based on the two Church of England parish churches of St Mary and St George, were united into a single civil parish in 1934 and into a single ecclesiastical parish in 1971.

The parish gives its name to the 'Orcheston long grass' (Agrostis stolonifera), also called 'Creeping Bent', the most commonly used species of Agrostis. The Rough-Stalked Meadow Grass (Poa trivialis), is also called Orcheston Grass, and in the early 19th century there was something of a controversy among botanists as to which was the true Orcheston Grass.

The source of the River Till is near the village; the entire river is a biological Site of Special Scientific Interest (SSSI).

As of 2009, Orcheston contains about sixty-five houses, of which twenty-six are listed buildings, and has a single parish council. Almost all local government services are provided by the Wiltshire Council unitary authority.

== Churches ==
St Mary's Church dates from the 13th century and is Grade II* listed. In 1971 the benefice was united with those of Chitterne and Tilshead; today the church is part of the Salisbury Plain benefice, which also includes the churches at Shrewton.

St George's Church is also from the 13th century and also Grade II* listed. Having been declared redundant in 1982, it is in the care of the Churches Conservation Trust.

== Notable people ==
Maurice Roy Ridley (1890–1969), writer and poet, Fellow and Chaplain of Balliol College, Oxford, was born in Orcheston. Dorothy L. Sayers is reputed to have based the appearance of her fictional detective Lord Peter Wimsey on him.

Mick Channon, footballer and racehorse trainer, was born in the village.

== Bibliography ==
- 'Orcheston St George' in A History of the County of Wiltshire, Volume XIX (work in progress)
- Peter Daniels, Around Amesbury in old photographs (1990)
