= Ibberton =

Village in Dorset, England

Coordinates: 50.8692°N 2.3034°W

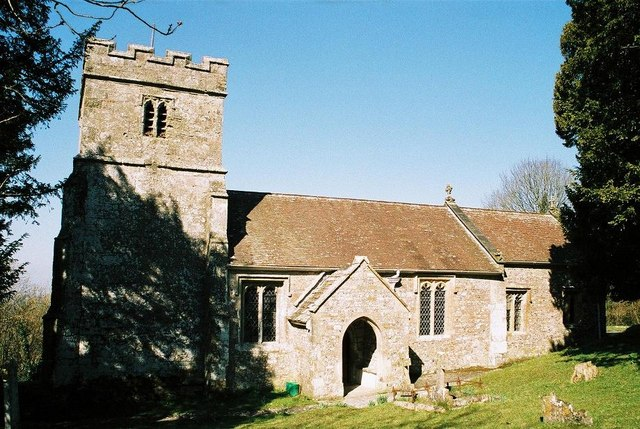
- Parish church of St Eustace

- Location within Dorset
- Population: 101
- OS grid reference: ST788077
- Civil parish: Ibberton
- Unitary authority: Dorset
- Ceremonial county: Dorset
- Region: South West
- Country: England
- Sovereign state: United Kingdom
- Post town: Blandford Forum
- Postcode district: DT11
- Police: Dorset
- Fire: Dorset and Wiltshire
- Ambulance: South Western
- UK Parliament: North Dorset

Ibberton is a village and civil parish in the county of Dorset in southern England. It is situated in the Blackmore Vale under the scarp face of the Dorset Downs, five miles (eight kilometres) south of Sturminster Newton and 7 miles (11 kilometres) west of Blandford Forum. The parish covers 1,382 acres (559 hectares) extending over the chalk downs that lie to the south and includes the hamlets of Leigh, and Kitford. In the 2011 census the parish had a population of 101, a reduction from 134 in 2001.

The name Ibberton derives from the Old English Ēadbeorht (a personal name), ing and tūn, and means 'estate associated with the man Ēadbeorht'. In 1086 in the Domesday Book it was recorded as Abristetone. Later variants of the name include Ebrictinton and Edbrichton.

The parish church of St Eustace occupies a site that gives far-reaching views northwards over the Blackmore Vale, and Ibberton Hill to the south provides an even loftier vantage point.

Community facilities within the village include a village hall, which is also used by the neighbouring villages of Belchalwell and Woolland, and a cricket ground.
