= Blackdown, Dorset =

Village in England

Coordinates: 50.82217°N 2.85646°W

Blackdown: Blackdown
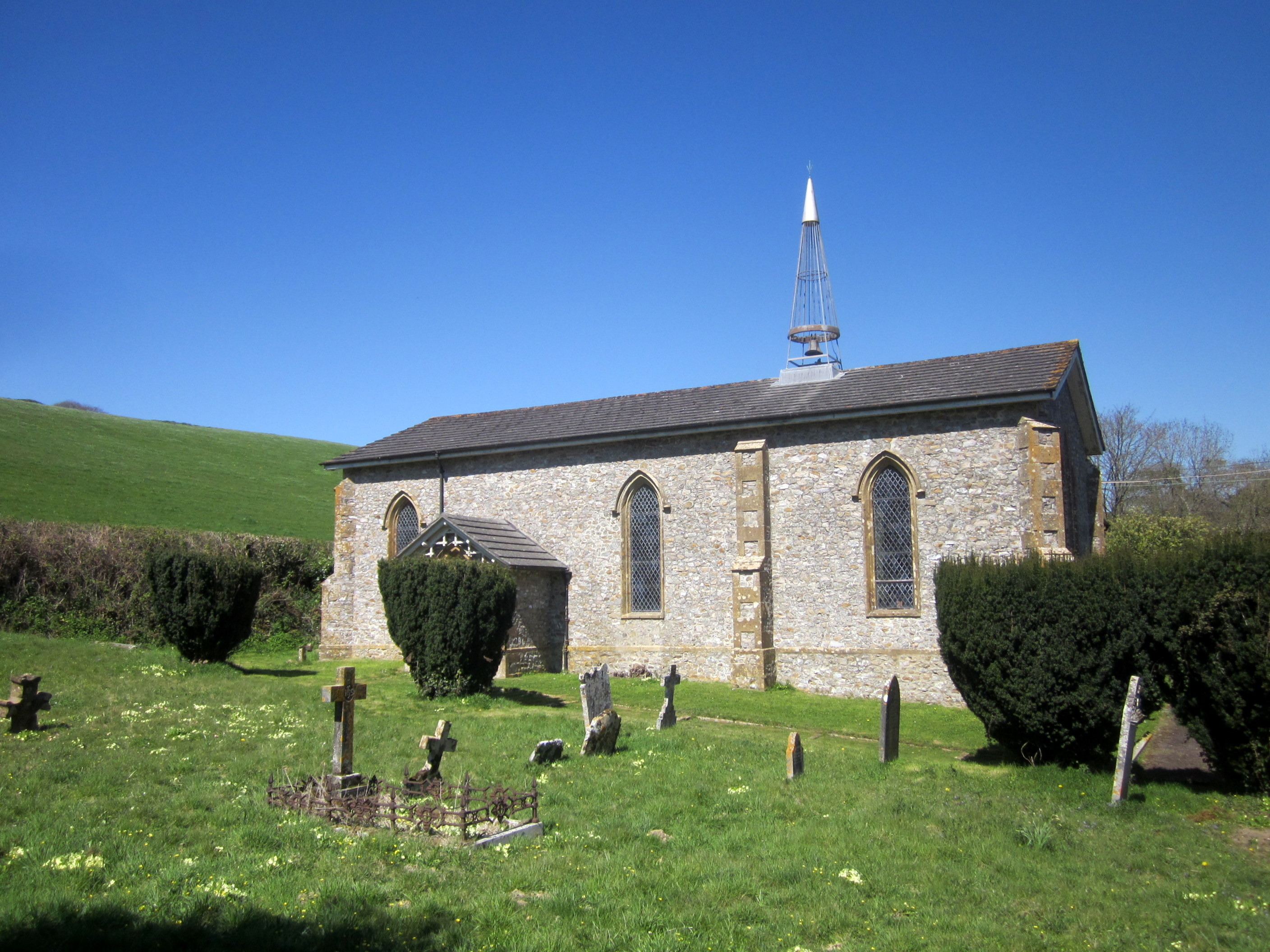
- Holy Trinity Church

- Location within Dorset
- Population: 128
- OS grid reference: ST397028
  - London: 144 miles (232 km)
- Civil parish: Broadwindsor
- Unitary authority: Dorset
- Ceremonial county: Dorset
- Region: South West
- Country: England
- Sovereign state: United Kingdom
- Post town: BEAMINSTER
- Postcode district: DT8
- Dialling code: 01308; 01460/01297
- Police: Dorset
- Fire: Dorset and Wiltshire
- Ambulance: South Western
- UK Parliament: West Dorset

Blackdown is a village in Broadwindsor parish in the west of Dorset, England, situated on the B3165 road 7 miles (11 km) west of Beaminster. It had a population of 128 at the 2001 Census.

The village lies at the foot of Blackdown Hill, which at 215 metres (705 ft) is one of Dorset's high points from which there are extensive views of the local area.

== History ==
The Chapel of Ease dedicated to the Holy Trinity was built in 1840 on the site of a former chapel building which had become derelict. There are a few graves which are earlier than 1840. On the night of 16–17 December 1961 the chapel was destroyed by a fire due to a wood-burning stove which had been lit overnight for a service the next day. The church was rebuilt and rededicated in 1964.

Buried in the graveyard is John Anthony Brown, who was killed by his wife Elizabeth Martha Brown at nearby Birdsmoregate in 1856. Despite a plea for clemency, Elizabeth was publicly hanged at Dorchester Prison, a sight witnessed by many, including a 16-year-old Thomas Hardy, who years later asked Lady Hester Pinney who lived at Racedown House to investigate the story. It is believed that Hardy may have based Tess of the d'Urbervilles on his experience.

Blackdown also has a village hall, built on ground owned by the Pinney family of Racedown House. It was initially called Blackdown Hut and officially opened on 9 December 1920 by Lady Rhodes Moorhouse. It was a destroyed by a fire on the 8 September 1976 but was rebuilt and reopened exactly three years later.

== Education ==
Blackdown comes under the catchment area of Marshwood Primary Academy School, 3 miles (4.8 km) away, with secondary education being provided at Woodroffe School, 10 miles (16 km) away. Village children are entitled to free transport. The village school, situated next to the church and now a private house, closed because of dwindling numbers, although it reopened during World War Two to accommodate evacuees.

== Governance ==
Blackdown is part of the Marshwood Vale electoral ward, which elects one member to Dorset Council.

The village and surrounding area make up the Blackdown ward of the Broadwindsor parish council.
