= East Orchard =

Village and civil parish in Dorset, England

Coordinates: 50.9605°N 2.2392°W

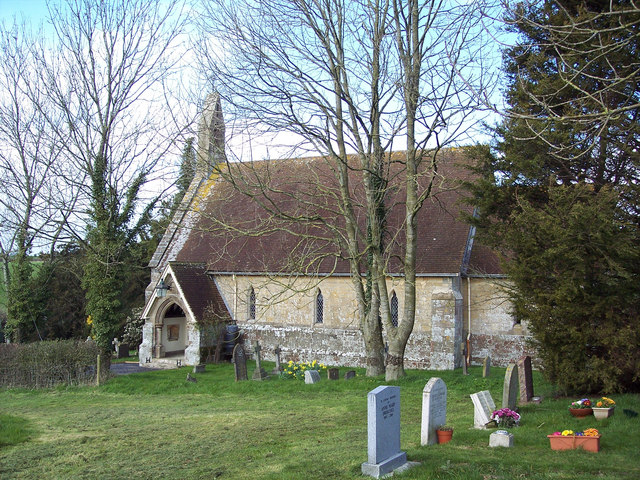
- Church of St Thomas, East Orchard

- Location within Dorset
- Population: 100
- OS grid reference: ST833179
- Civil parish: East Orchard
- Unitary authority: Dorset
- Ceremonial county: Dorset
- Region: South West
- Country: England
- Sovereign state: United Kingdom
- Post town: SHAFTESBURY
- Postcode district: SP7
- Dialling code: 01747
- Police: Dorset
- Fire: Dorset and Wiltshire
- Ambulance: South Western
- UK Parliament: North Dorset

East Orchard is a small village and parish in the county of Dorset in southern England. It lies in the Blackmore Vale within the Dorset administrative district. It is situated roughly midway between the hilltop town of Shaftesbury and the riverside town of Sturminster Newton. It is separated from the neighbouring village of West Orchard by a small stream. In 2013 the estimated population of the civil parish was 100. For local government purposes the parish is grouped with the parishes of West Orchard and Margaret Marsh, to form a Group Parish Council.

== Etymology ==
The name of East Orchard is first attested in a charter of 939 (surviving in a fifteenth-century copy), in the form Archet. It does not appear in the Domesday Book (the Horcerd found there is more likely to refer to Orchard near Church Knowle on Purbeck). The name derives from the Common Brittonic words that survive in modern Welsh as ar ("on") and coed ("wood"), and thus the name once meant "at the wood". Its modern form shows assimilation to the English noun orchard through folk-etymology. The element East was added to the name later when the settlement became distinct from West Orchard.
