= St Mary's Church, Mosterton =

Church in Dorset, England

St Mary's Church
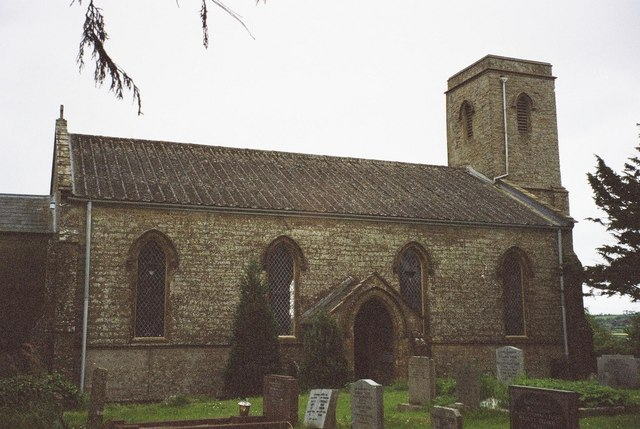

Religion
- Affiliation: Church of England
- Ecclesiastical or organizational status: Active
- Year consecrated: 1833

Location
- Location: Mosterton, Dorset, England
- Interactive map of St Mary's Church
- Coordinates: 50.8467°N 2.7718°W

Architecture
- Architect: Edmund Pearce
- Type: Church

St Mary's Church is a Church of England parish church in Mosterton, Dorset, England. The church was designed by Edmund Pearce and built in 1832–33 to replace an earlier building. The church is now part of the Beaminster Area Team Ministry and is a Grade II listed building.

== History ==
St Mary's was built to replace an earlier place of worship which dated to the 15th century and was made up of a nave, chancel and north porch. The site of the earlier chapel was opposite Chapel Court Farm, where a number of gravestones are still in existence. A chapel is known to have existed in the village as early as 1086 when the Domesday Book recorded one at "Mortestorne".

By the early 19th century, the 15th century chapel had fallen into disrepair and was considered inadequate. It was sited in an inconvenient location for many of the inhabitants and had become too small to serve the congregation as the parish's population increased. Plans were made to build a new church at a more central location, approximately half a mile from the old building.

An Order of Vestry, dated 1 February 1832, was issued to "procure a plan, elevation, estimate and specification for building an entirely new chapel". The requirement was for the chapel to accommodate 350 people and the cost of construction to be no more than £700. The new building was "to be built as much in the old Gothic style of Church Architecture as the limited funds will permit".

The plans for the church were drawn up by Mr. Edmund Pearce of Canford Magna and it was built by Mr. Elias Dawe of South Perrott. A grant was received from the Incorporated Society which allowed 259 of the 359 sittings to be free and unappropriated. The opening and consecration of the church was carried out on 27 September 1833 by the Bishop of Bath and Wells, the Right Rev. George Henry Law. The Bishop appeared on behalf of the Bishop of Bristol, who was unable to attend and perform the consecration due to illness.

== Architecture ==
The church is built of ashlar stone, corrugated asbestos and tiled roofs. It is made up of a four-bay nave, chancel, north porch and west three-stage tower. The west end of the nave has a gallery. Many of the church's windows are of wide lancet style. The church retains its original fittings, some of which were transferred from the old chapel, including the font, which has an octagonal bowl and a cylindrical pedestal. The tower contains a single bell of early 17th century date. In 1975, a stained glass window was installed in the east window, which depicts the farming background of many of the local community and includes a combine harvester and a tractor.
