= St Martin's Church, Weymouth =

Former church Weymouth, Dorset, England

St Martin's Church
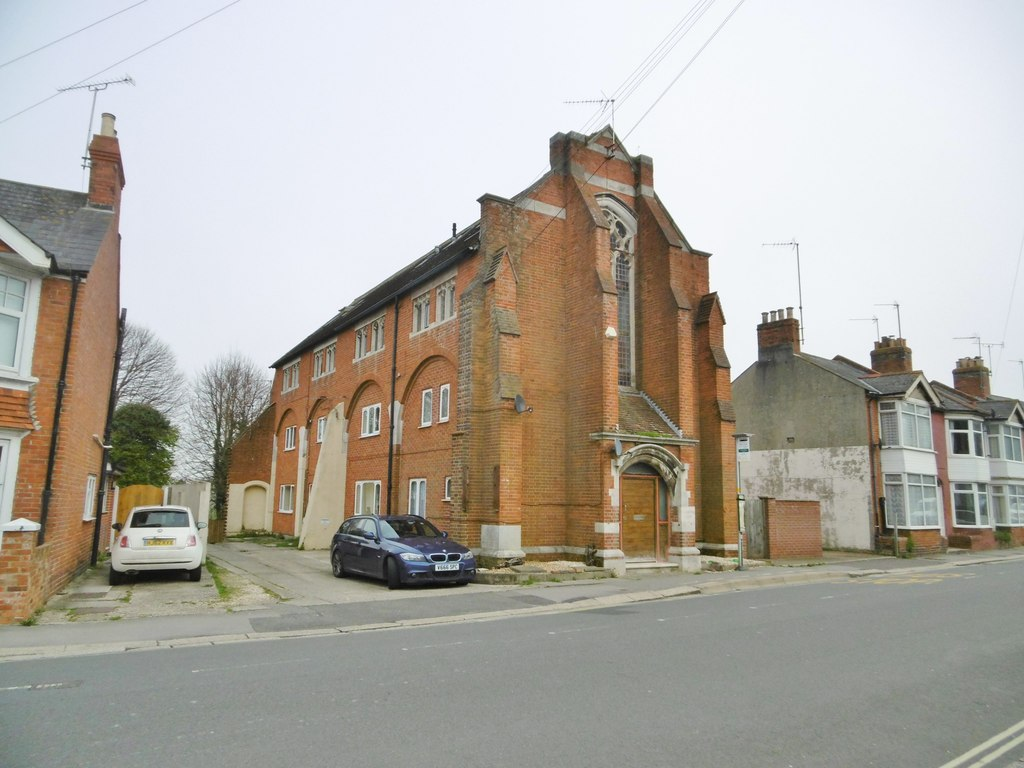

Religion
- Affiliation: Church of England
- Ecclesiastical or organizational status: Redundant

Location
- Location: Weymouth, Dorset, England
- Interactive map of St Martin's Church
- Coordinates: 50.6064°N 2.4646°W

Architecture
- Architect: Charles Edwin Ponting
- Type: Church
- Completed: 1908

St Martin's Church is a former Church of England church in Weymouth, Dorset, England. It was designed by Charles Edwin Ponting and built in 1907–08. The church was declared redundant in 1965 and now forms eight flats as St Martin's Court.

== History ==
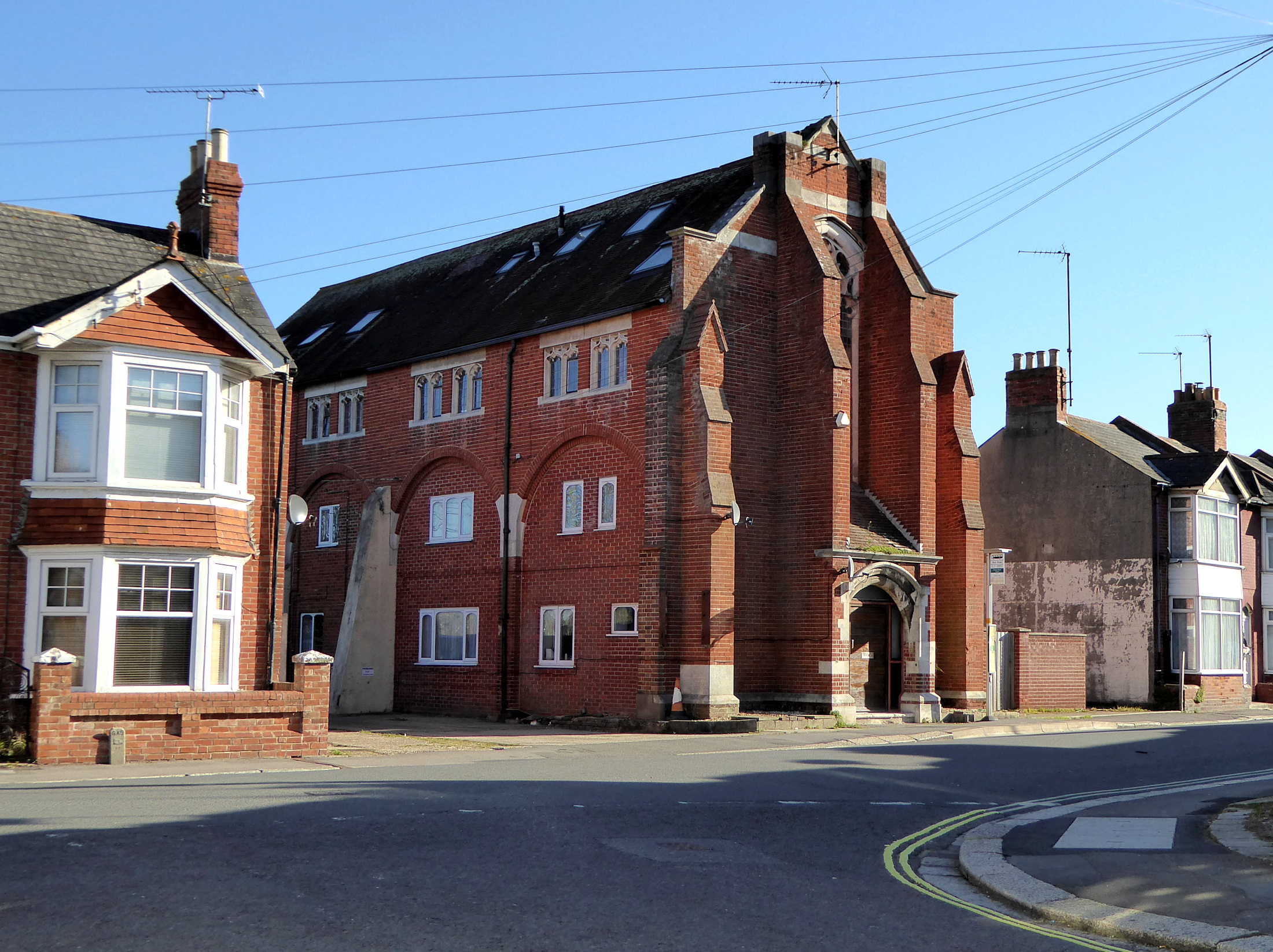
St Martin's Church

St Martin's was built on Chickerell Road, Rodwell, as a chapel of ease to Holy Trinity as a result of the growing population in the parish, particularly around Chickerell Road. An earlier, temporary mission room of St Martin had been established facing the nearby recreation ground, but was soon inadequate to serve the parish. As a large proportion of the parish was considered poor, the vicar of the time, Rev. L. B. Weldon, considered a new church necessary to draw the "poorer brethren of the parish toward the Church".

A meeting of the vestry held in 1905 determined a new church should be built and fundraising began. Donations were raised by public subscription, donations and grants, including £100 from the Diocesan Church Building Association. A plot of land was acquired at Chickerell Road for £400.

The plans for the church were drawn up by Charles Edwin Ponting of Marlborough and Messrs Jesty and Baker of Portland were hired as the builders, with Mr. D. Grant acting as clerk of the works. The foundation stone was laid by Miss Morrice on 30 October 1907.

Owing to the limited funds available, only the nave, porch and part of the crypt was built as part of the original construction work. It was intended to add a chancel and side aisles at a later date, but this did not come to fruition. The construction of the main body of the church provided accommodation for 198 persons, while the complete scheme for St Martin's intended to accommodate 523.

The church was dedicated by the Bishop of Salisbury, the Right Rev. John Wordsworth, on 30 October 1908. It had cost £2,560 at the time of its opening, of which £300 had yet to be raised.

St Martin's closed in 1949, although the building saw continued use by the Weymouth and District Deaf and Dumb Club and the executive committee of Toc H Weymouth. Services for the Deaf and Dumb Club were held until 1955. St Martin's later reopened as a place of worship in 1961 but closed again in 1965.

The church was later converted into the residential St Martin's Court. It was originally split into two dwellings in the 1980s, but is now made up of eight flats. Planning permission was obtained in 2007 to split one half of the church, No. 1, into four separate flats. In 2008, permission was also granted to convert No. 2's maisonette into three flats.

== Architecture ==
St Martin's is built of Fordingbridge red brick with Portland stone dressings in the Decorated style. The church had to be built on deep concrete foundations owing to the sloping ground and soft subsoil. The roof, which was tiled with dark red sand-faced tiles, had a bell turret added, which was surmounted by a wrought-iron cross. Part of the intended crypt was completed in the work of 1907–08, which was to form a larger parish room but was instead used as a vestry. The porch has a large three-light traceried window above and flanking buttresses rising up to the roof. The nave was built with clerestory windows and an open-timbered roof. In addition to the interior of the walls, the piles and arches were also faced with Fordingbridge brick. The floors were made of wood on concrete and the main doors of oak.

Chairs rather than pews formed the seating. The choir stalls were sourced from St George's at Bourton and the font from St Peter's at North Poorton. The church's pulpit was moved from Holy Trinity to the new church, while many of the fittings of the temporary St Martin's were also transferred there.
