= St George's Church, Orcheston =

St George's Church
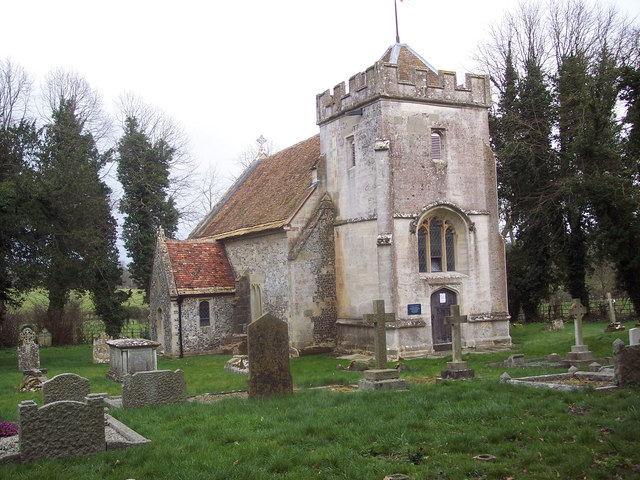

- Location within Wiltshire
- 51°12′11″N 1°54′56″W
- Location: Orcheston, Wiltshire, England

History
- Built: 13th century

Listed Building – Grade II*
- Official name: Church of St. George
- Designated: 4 July 1985
- Reference no.: 1024021

St George's Church in Orcheston, Wiltshire, England, was built in the 13th century. It is recorded in the National Heritage List for England as a Grade II* listed building, and is now a redundant church in the care of the Churches Conservation Trust. It was declared redundant on 1 March 1982, and was vested in the Trust on 30 October 1985.

The church is built of flint and has a Norman north door. The door has single columns which are headed by simple scallop-shaped carvings with fan-shaped leaves in the scallops. The short embattled west tower has a tiled pyramidal roof. It contains three bells which were cast by John Taylor & Co of Loughborough following fire damage to the bells which previously hung there; another source lists four, including a bell from the Salisbury foundry of c.1400.

The windows in the nave and Early English chancel and low tower also date from the 13th century. The tower is supported by diagonal buttresses. Inside are the Royal Arms of 1636. The font is of a style popular in the 15th century, although it was made in 1833. The funerary hatchment is also from the 1830s.

The church was restored in 1833 by Thomas Henry Wyatt, during which the roof of nave was raised. In 1933 the parish of St George was combined with St Mary's, the other church in the village, which continues in use.

In 1988 the church was used as a location for the filming of the BBC television series First Born with Charles Dance ringing the church's bells.

== See also ==
- List of churches preserved by the Churches Conservation Trust in Southwest England
