= Holy Trinity Church, Blackdown =

Church in Blackdown, Dorset, England

Holy Trinity Church
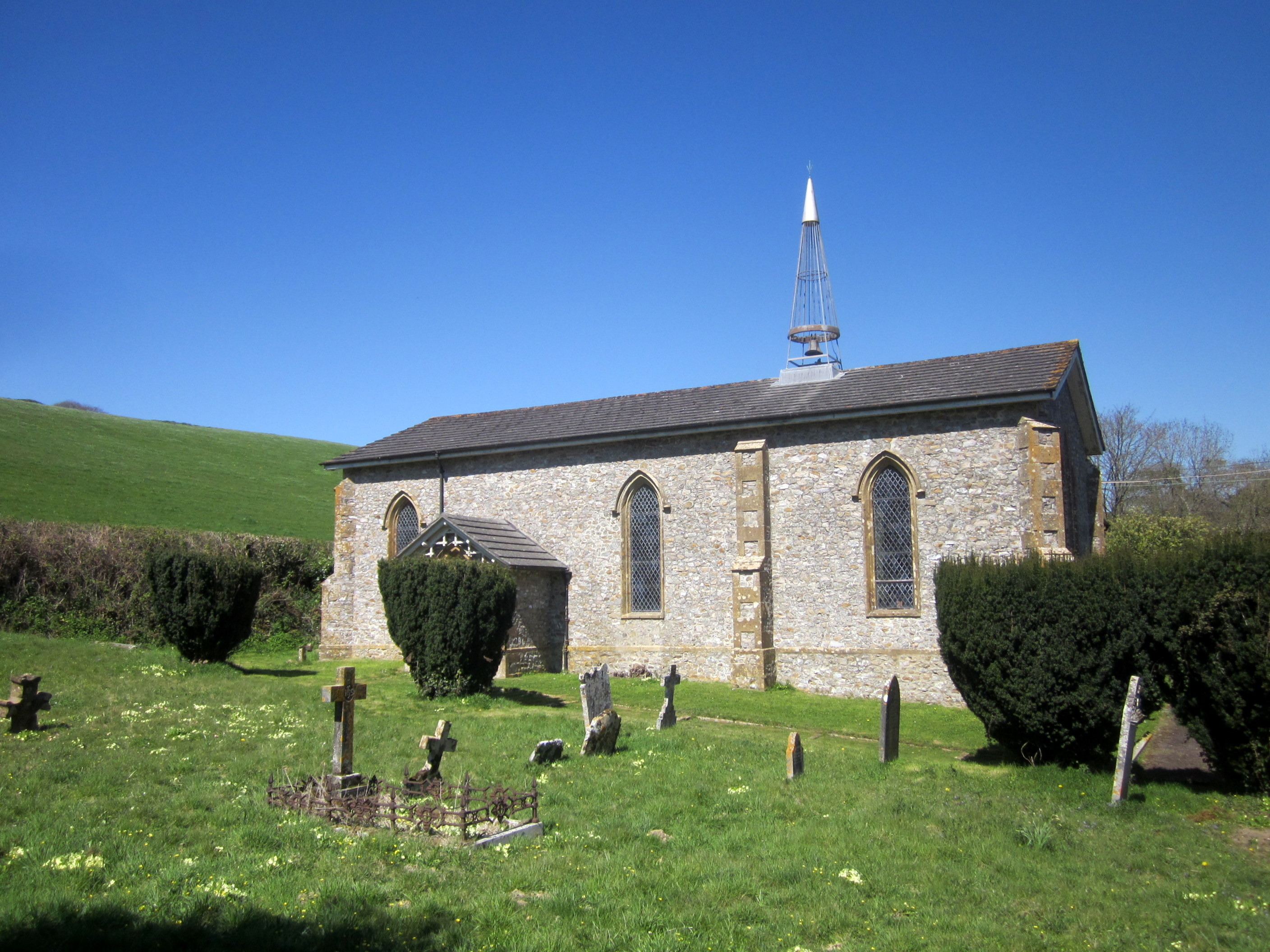

Religion
- Affiliation: Church of England
- Ecclesiastical or organizational status: Active
- Year consecrated: 1840

Location
- Location: Blackdown, Dorset, England
- Interactive map of Holy Trinity Church
- Coordinates: 50.8240°N 2.85845°W

Architecture
- Architect: Edward Ledger Bracebridge
- Type: Church

Holy Trinity Church is a Church of England church in Blackdown, Dorset, England. The church was designed by Edward Ledger Bracebridge and built in 1839–40. It now forms part of the Beaminster Area Team Ministry.

== History ==
Holy Trinity was built in 1839–40 as a chapel of ease to the parish church of St John the Baptist in Broadwindsor. Its construction was initiated through the efforts of the vicar of Broadwindsor, Rev. George Denison. At the time, the parish had a population of almost 1,600, some of whom were miles from the parish church. The church at Blackdown was built in a location central to approximately 400 inhabitants who were around three miles from St John.

The plans for the church were drawn up by Edward Ledger Bracebridge of London (the only example of his work in Dorset). It was designed to accommodate 290 people, with 162 of the sittings being free and unappropriated, 68 of which were in a gallery. Much of the church's cost was sourced by Rev. Denison from private loans, as well as the Queen Anne's Bounty. The Salisbury Diocesan Church Building Association also provided a grant of £150 in January 1839. The completed church and its burial ground was consecrated by the Bishop of Salisbury, the Right Rev. Edward Denison, on 22 April 1840.

In 1894, restoration work was carried out at the church and it received improved seating. The vicar of the time, Rev. H. R. W. Farrer, contributed £35 of the approximate £100 cost. The rest of the required funds were raised within the parish, including at a sale of work held in the grounds of Blackdown House on 6 June. The church was closed for three weeks during September and October 1894, while the restoration work was carried out by Mr. Cooper of Bridport. The church reopened with a harvest thanksgiving service on 5 October 1894. The debt from the restoration was cleared with a sale of work held at Blackdown National School in July 1895. In 1900, a painted and carved reredos was installed in the church, along with a painting of the Nativity, by Rev. G. C. Hutchings and his wife in memory of Rev. Denison.

=== 1961 fire and 1964 restoration ===
During the night of 16–17 December 1961, the church was gutted by fire, which started from the wood-burning stove that had been lit during the day in anticipation of the following Sunday morning service. At the time, Chard and the surrounding area had seen a number of arson attacks and police initially feared the church had also been targeted by the "Chard Fire Bug". The flames, which were reported as reaching 60 feet high and could be seen for miles around, were put out by four brigades. Some parishioners arrived the following morning for service, unaware of the fire.

The fire caused the collapse of the roof and destruction of the interior, leaving only the walls remaining. The following two years saw fundraising towards the restoration/rebuilding costs, and a faculty for the work was obtained in November 1963. The work was carried out in 1964 by R. G. Spiller of Chard to the designs of John Stark of the Dorchester architects Jackson and Stark. A new roof with a stainless steel bell spire was added, the existing walls were repaired and re-plastered internally, and new fittings were added. The church reopened with a re-dedication service carried out by the Archdeacon of Sherborne, the Right Rev. David Maddock, on 29 November 1964. The 50th anniversary of the church's reopening was celebrated with a thanksgiving service led by the Bishop of Sherborne, the Right Rev. Graham Kings.

== Architecture ==
Holy Trinity is built of rubble stone, with ashlar dressings and slate-covered roofs. The church is made up of a nave and chancel under one roof, a north vestry and south porch. The west end of the roof originally had a bell-cot, destroyed by the 1961 fire. The west gallery, also destroyed, was accessed externally. The stairway remains but the gallery entrance at the top has been blocked-up.

Most of the church's windows are one-light; the east window is made up of three lancets. Many of the church's fittings and furnishings have been gifted or received from redundant churches. The lectern, font and organ have all been received from other churches. A harmonium was gifted by Mrs. Burkinshaw of Uplyme in May 1965.
