= Holy Trinity Church, Swyre =

Church in Dorset, England

Holy Trinity Church
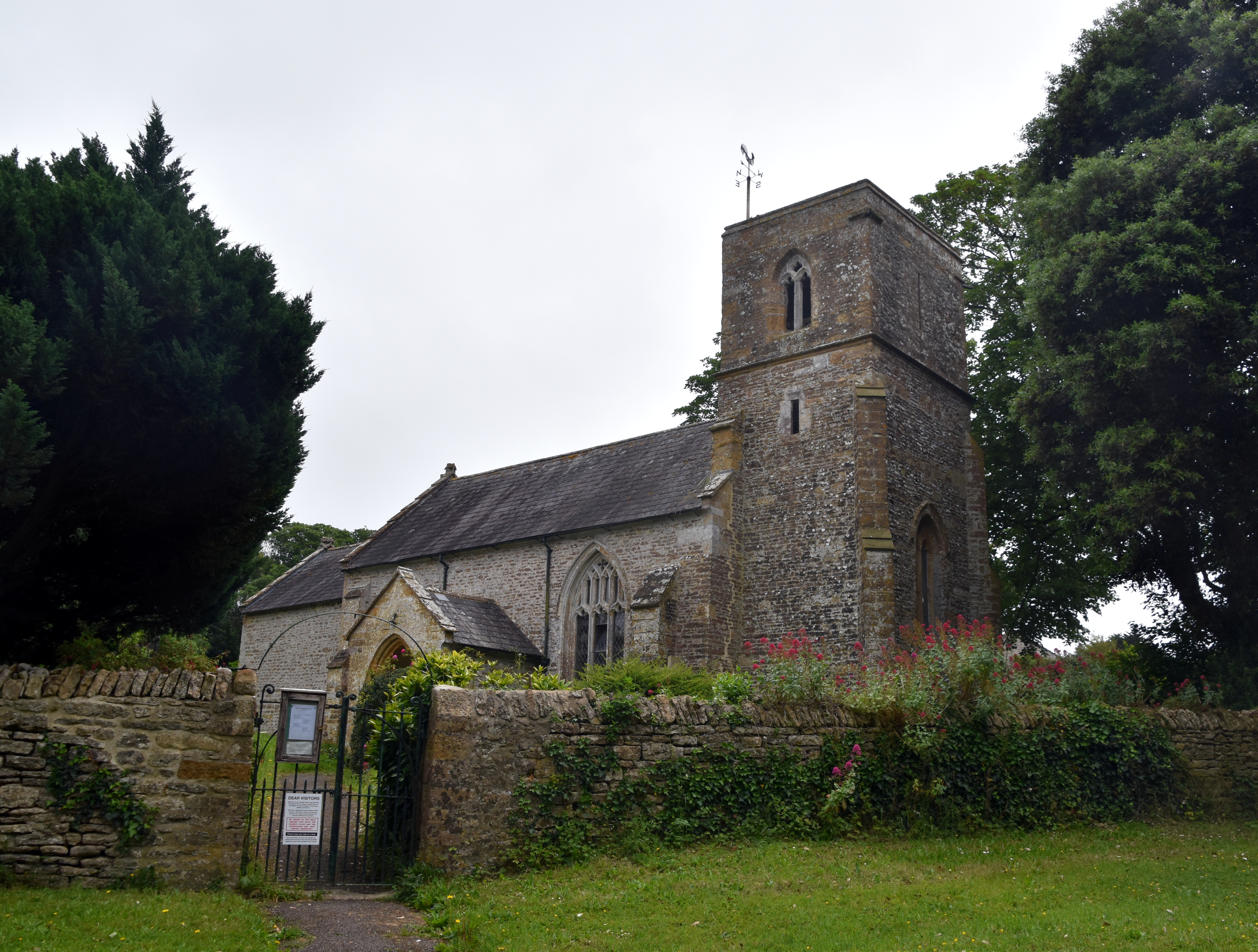

Religion
- Affiliation: Church of England
- Ecclesiastical or organizational status: Active

Location
- Location: Swyre, Dorset, England
- Interactive map of Holy Trinity Church
- Coordinates: 50.6918°N 2.6694°W

Architecture
- Type: Church
- Style: Early English

Holy Trinity Church is a Church of England church in Swyre, Dorset, England. The oldest part of the church has been dated to the early 15th century, with a partial rebuild and additions later made in the 19th century. The church is a Grade I listed building.

== History ==
A church serving Swyre is known to have existed since the 13th century, with the earliest record of a rector there dating to 1297. The oldest parts of the existing church date to c. 1400, which includes the chancel arch and west tower. The clergyman and county historian John Hutchins was rector at Swyre from 1729 to 1733, and he had the chancel repaired at his own expense during that time.

In 1843–44, the rebuilding of the nave was carried out at the sole expense of the Duke of Bedford and the chancel at the cost of the rector, Rev. John Wickens. The church reopened on 25 August 1844. A vestry and organ chamber was added to the church in 1885 at the sole expense of the rector, Rev. Orlando Spencer Smith.

== Architecture ==
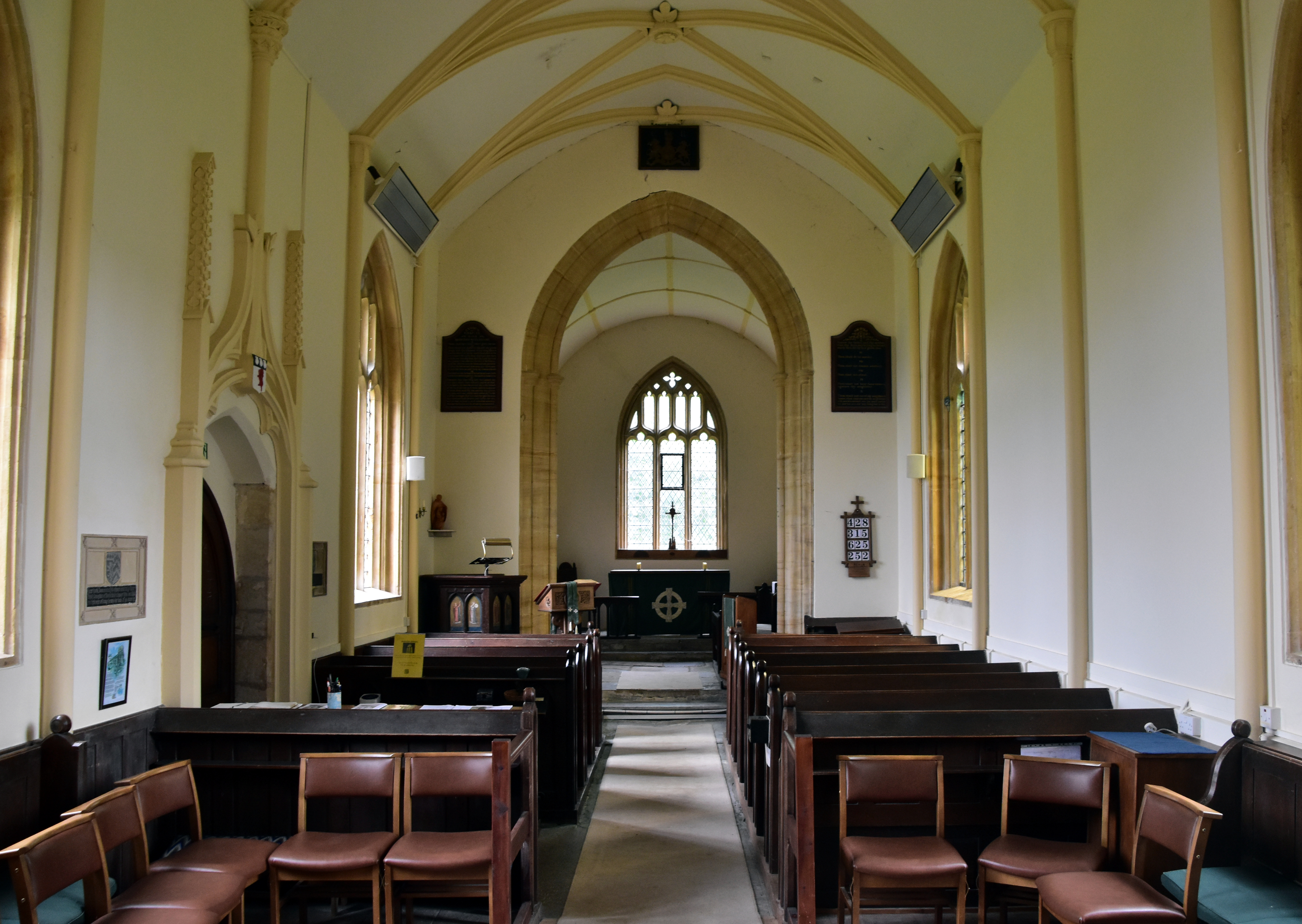
The interior of Holy Trinity Church.

Holy Trinity is built of local stone, with slate-covered roofs. It is made up of a nave, chancel, north porch, west tower and vestry/organ chamber. In the north wall of the nave is a reset doorway which partially dates to the late 14th century. The tower has a plain parapet and contains two bells believed to be of 15th century origin.

Internal features include the Royal Arms of Charles II above the chancel arch. The arch is flanked by two painted panels of late 18th century origin which list the Ten Commandments. On the north wall of the nave is a brass memorial, with shield-of-arms, to John Russell and his wife Elizabeth (Frocksmer), dated 1505, and another to James Russell and his wife Alys (Wise), dated 1509. The west wall has an undated memorial to George Gollope and seven of his children, two sons-in-law and a grandchild, spanning from 1745 to 1787. On the north wall of the chancel is a monument erected to James Napier and family by Sir Robert Napier, dated 1692.

The octagonal font is of 15th century date. The church's organ was installed in 1890. It was built by Alfred Kirkland of London and restored in 1976 by George Osmond & Co of Taunton.
