= Holy Trinity Church, Weymouth =

Church in Dorset, England

Holy Trinity Church
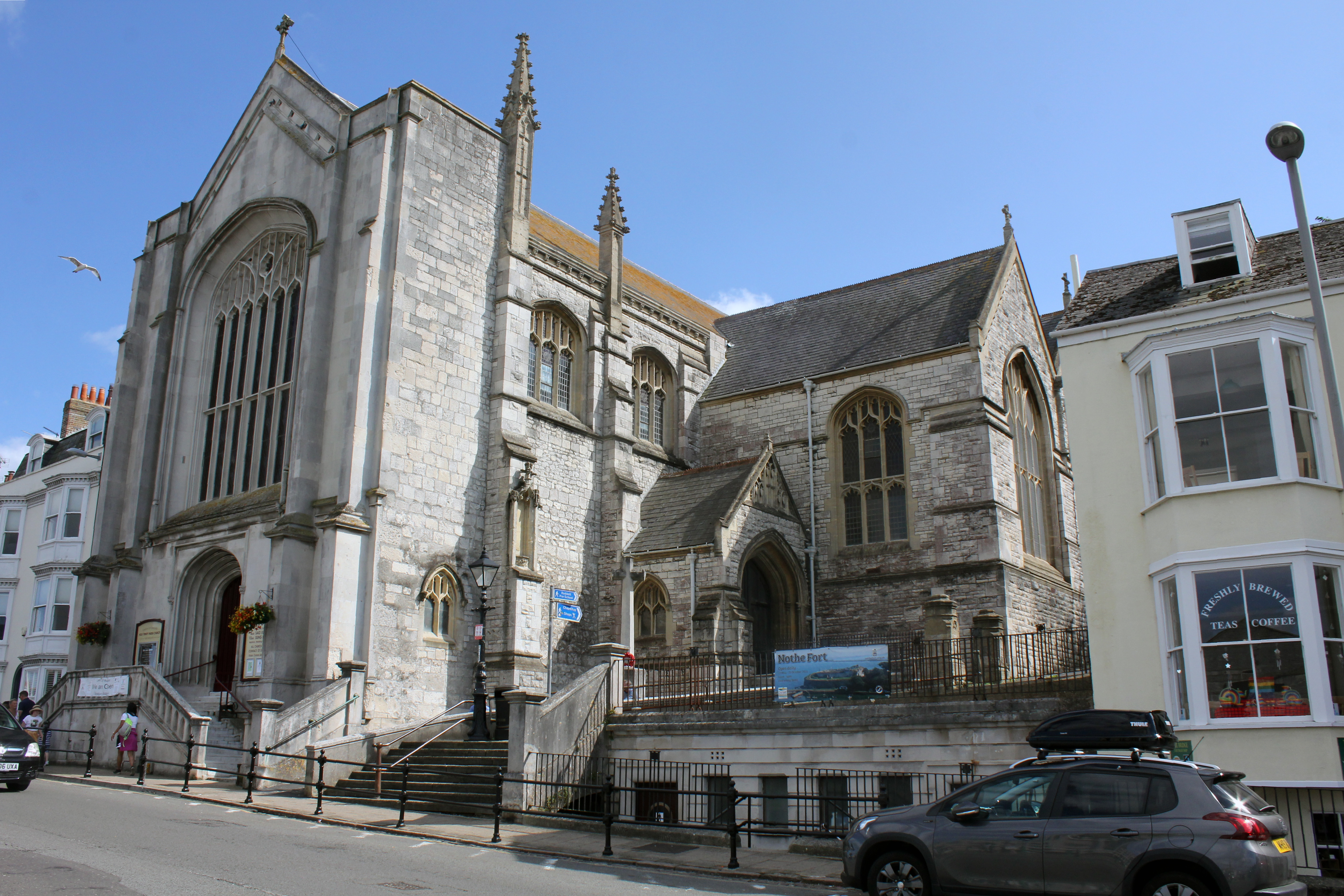

Religion
- Affiliation: Church of England
- Ecclesiastical or organizational status: Active
- Year consecrated: 1836

Location
- Location: Weymouth, Dorset, England
- Interactive map of Holy Trinity Church
- Coordinates: 50.6067°N 2.4555°W

Architecture
- Architect: Philip Wyatt
- Type: Church

Holy Trinity Church is a Church of England church in Weymouth, Dorset, England. Built of Portland stone in 1834–36, and extended and re-oriented in 1886–87, the church is a Grade II* listed building. Designed by Philip Wyatt, it has been described as being of "intrinsic architectural interest", having an "unusual scheme of development" and "occupying a significant position on the axis of Weymouth's Town Bridge".

== History ==
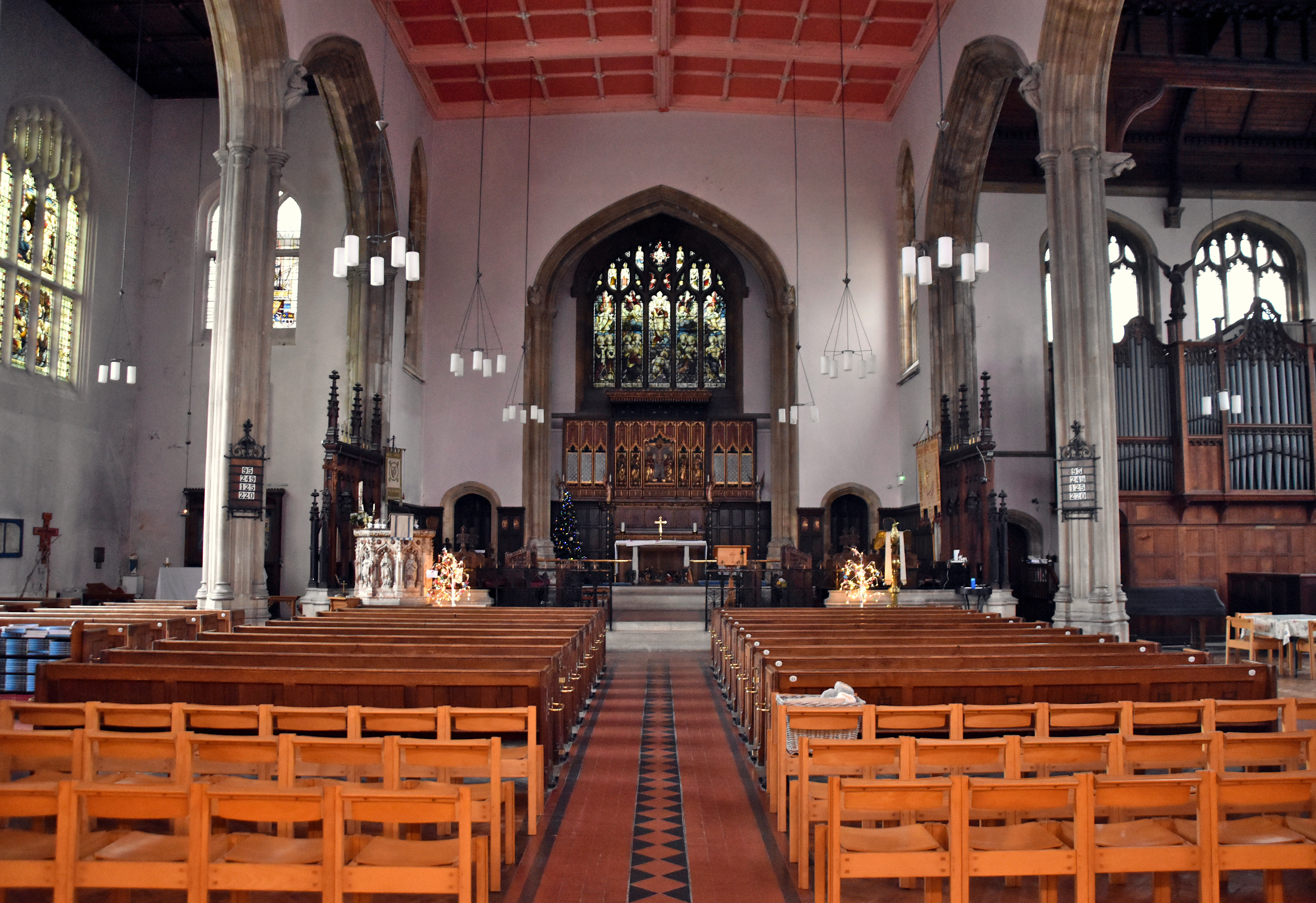
The interior of Holy Trinity Church.

Holy Trinity was built at a time when new church accommodation was required to meet the needs of the growing population of Weymouth. For centuries, the town was served by the parish church of All Saints in Wyke Regis. A chapel of ease dedicated to St. Nicholas was also built in Weymouth during the 12th century, but suffered severe damage in the English Civil War. The rector of Weymouth and Wyke Regis, Rev. George Chamberlaine had Holy Trinity constructed at his sole expense in 1834–36. The plans for the church were drawn up by Philip Wyatt.

The foundation stone of the new church was laid by Rev. Chamberlaine's wife on 1 September 1834. Mr. Fooks and Fawn of Weymouth were hired as contractors, with Wyatt acting as supervisor. After his death in 1835, his nephew, Matthew Wyatt, saw the project to completion. Holy Trinity was consecrated by the Bishop of Winchester, the Right Rev. Charles Sumner, on 6 August 1836, The church's completion saw Holy Trinity become its own parish, separated from Wyke Regis.

As the parish's population continued to grow over the course of the 19th century, Holy Trinity became too small and consideration was made whether to extend the church or build a new one. As a suitable site for a new church was unable to be found, it was decided to extend the existing church and plans were drawn up by Messrs. Crickmay and Son for its extension, alteration and restoration. Work began in 1886, with Mr. Arthur Clarke of Weymouth as the contractor, supervised by the architects. Holy Trinity reopened on 12 April 1887, although work continued into 1888.

The architects had the church's interior re-orientated as the original layout was considered to be "badly arranged", owing to the narrow pews and the chancel being at the side of the church. The altar was moved from the north to south end of the nave, and the south gallery removed. A double transept and porch was built on the south side, while a double transept and organ chamber was formed by converting and enlarging the original chancel on the north side. A new chancel and choir was constructed at the east end, and arcades added on either side of the nave. New clergy and choir vestries were also built, along with a baptistry near the west entrance. The renovation work included the relaying of all flooring, reseating the church with new benches and reglazing the windows.

The parish of Holy Trinity also had two chapels of ease. The iron church of St Nicholas was established at Buxton Road in 1894. It was replaced by a new church building dedicated in 1964 and closed in 2018. The former church of St Martin was built at Chickerell Road in 1907–08. It closed in 1965 and is now converted to residential use.
