= St Peter and St Paul's Church, Caundle Marsh =

Church in Dorset, England

St Peter and St Paul's Church
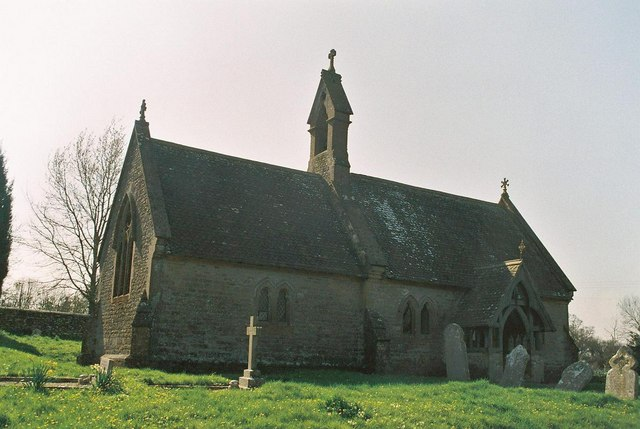

Religion
- Affiliation: Church of England
- Ecclesiastical or organizational status: Active
- Year consecrated: 1857

Location
- Location: Caundle Marsh, Dorset, England
- Interactive map of St Peter and St Paul's Church
- Coordinates: 50.9176°N 2.4596°W

Architecture
- Architect: Robert Howard Shout
- Type: Church
- Style: Early Decorated

St Peter and St Paul's Church is a Church of England parish church in Caundle Marsh, Dorset, England. It was designed by Robert Howard Shout and built in 1856–57. The church is a Grade II listed building.

== History ==
A church has existed at Caundle Marsh since at least the early 15th century, when it was mentioned in the registers of the dean of Salisbury Cathedral. By the mid-19th century, the church had become dilapidated and was subsequently demolished to make way for a new church on the same site. Plans for the new church were drawn up by Robert Howard Shout of Yeovil, with accommodation for 70 people.

On 28 March 1856, tenders were sought for the church's construction, with all tenders to be received on or before 21 April. Mr. Shewbrooks of Taunton was hired as the builder and work began that year under Shout's superintendence. The completed church was consecrated by the Bishop of Salisbury, the Right Rev. Walter Kerr Hamilton, on 18 July 1857.

=== 1920 restoration ===
In 1920, the church underwent restoration at the expense of Captain Lionel J. O. Lambert and his wife, the owners of the nearby country house Marsh Court. The restoration was carried out in memory of Mrs. Lambart's brother, Lieutenant Arthur Bertram Randolph of the 1st Battalion Welsh Guards, who was killed in the Battle of Loos on 25 September 1915. In addition to a restoration of the church's exterior and interior, the 1857 communion table, altar rails, pulpit and lectern were all replaced by new fittings of Hamstone. Captain Lambart and his wife also gifted an altar cross, candlesticks, communion linen and other ornaments.

During the work, two tablets were erected, one commemorating Lieutenant Randolph, and the other for two brothers of Caundle Marsh who fell in the war, Henry George Mitchell of the 5th Dorset Regiment and Arthur William Mitchell of the 1st Royal Warwicks. The new fittings were dedicated by the Vicar of Sherborne, Canon S. H. Wingfield Digby, R.D., during a memorial service held on 14 November 1920.

== Architecture ==
St Peter and St Paul's is built of squared and coursed local stone, with Hamstone dressings and roofs covered with scalloped and plain tiles. The gable ends of the roof have stone copings and cross finials. There is a bell-cot between nave and chancel. The church is made up of a nave, chancel and north porch. The open timbered porch and external doors are made of oak.

The interior contains work in stained red pine, including the roof-work and benches. The internal paving is of red and black tiles from Poole potteries. The oak reading desk is supported by wrought-iron brackets, and rests on a dwarf stone screen which divides the nave from the chancel. The original 1857 pulpit, now removed, was of oak on a stone base.

The church's eastern stained glass window as presented by Robert Willmott of Sherborne on 10 September 1856. It includes a representation of the Crucifixion at its centre and the symbol of the Holy Trinity at its head. Built into the north wall of the chancel is a recessed table-tomb under a four-centred arch, belonging to John Brit and dated 1587, which came from the old church. A Purbeck marble slab to William Gollop, dated 1691, is also located in the south-east region of the nave, and has an added inscription dating to 1802.
