= Church of St Eustace, Ibberton =

Church in Dorset, England

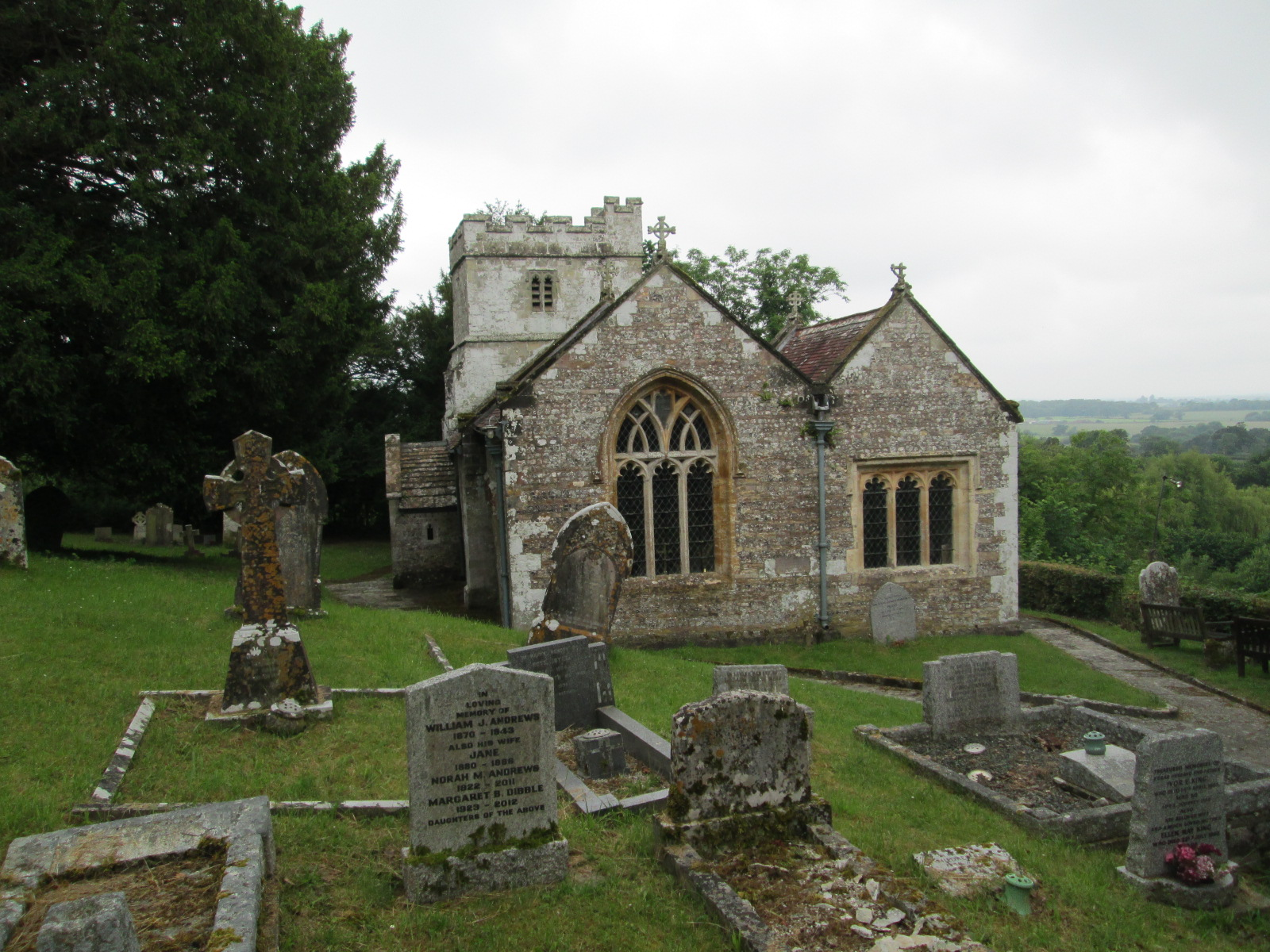
- View from the east
- Church of St Eustace, Ibberton
- 50°52′2″N 2°18′3″W
- OS grid reference: ST 789 076
- Location: Ibberton
- Country: England
- Denomination: Church of England

History
- Dedication: Saint Eustace

Architecture
- Heritage designation: Grade II*
- Designated: 4 Oct 1960

Administration
- Diocese: Diocese of Salisbury
- Deanery: Blackmore Vale Deanery

The Parish Church of St Eustace is a Grade II* listed Anglican church in the village of Ibberton, Dorset. It stands to the south of the village, on a steep hillside.

The parish is part of the Benefice of Hazelbury Bryan and the Hillside Parishes.

== Description ==
It is thought the oldest parts of the church date from between 1380 and 1400. It originally consisted of a chancel and nave; the north chapel and the tower were added in the 15th century, and the north aisle in the 16th century.

=== Exterior ===
The walls of the building are of banded rubble and flint. The tower, of squared rubble and ashlar, is in two stages with an embattled parapet.

=== Restoration ===
The building fell into disrepair in the late 19th century. In 1892 a temporary church was erected, of timber and corrugated iron: this was in use until 1909. It later became the village hall.

During the incumbency of Lionel Seymour Plowman, rector from 1899 to 1927, the church was restored by the architect Charles Ponting. Restoration, beginning in 1902, included rebuilding the north wall of the north chapel, the chancel arch and the porch. The church was re-opened on 17 July 1909, by John Wordsworth, Bishop of Salisbury.

=== Interior ===
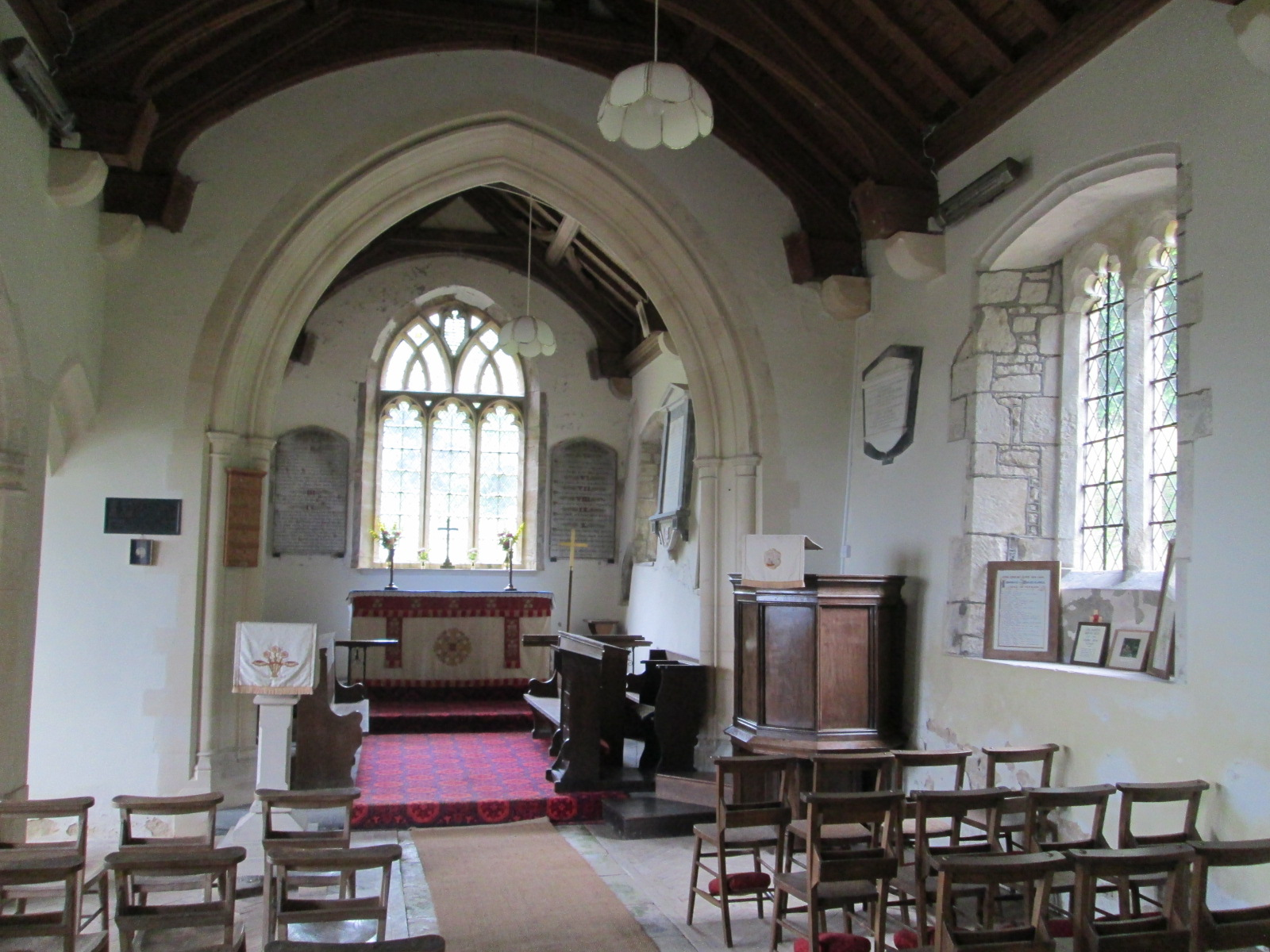
Interior, looking from the nave towards the chancel

On the east wall, on either side of the altar, are stone slabs of about 1800, engraved with the Ten Commandments. There are memorial tablets on the north and south walls of the chancel, to Richard D'Aubeny (rector from 1775 to 1802) and Joseph D'Aubeny, a squire of the parish.

The font is of the 15th century.

=== Bells ===
There are four bells in the tower: dated 1641, by William Purdue; 1656, by Thomas Purdue; 1799, by Thomas Mears; and 1813, by James Wells. Repairs to the bells and fittings were carried out by Whitechapel Bell Foundry in 1982.
