= St John's Church, Enmore Green =

Church in Dorset, England

St John's Church
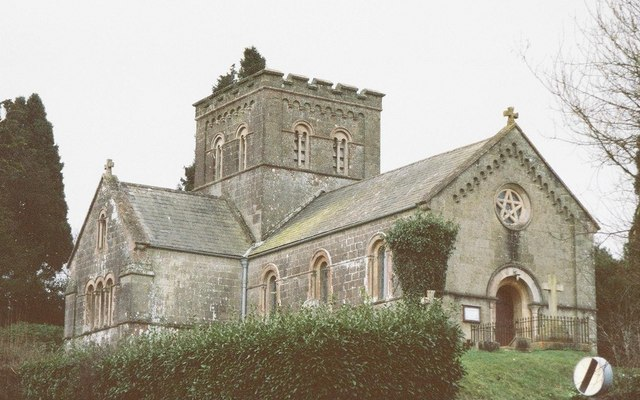

Religion
- Affiliation: Church of England
- Ecclesiastical or organizational status: Active
- Year consecrated: 1843

Location
- Location: Enmore Green, Dorset, England
- Interactive map of St John's Church
- Coordinates: 51.0074°N 2.2084°W

Architecture
- Architect: George Alexander
- Type: Church
- Style: Neo-Norman, Romanesque

St John's Church is a Church of England parish church in Enmore Green, Dorset, England. The church was designed by George Alexander and built in 1842–43. It is a Grade II listed building.

== History ==
St John's was built as a chapel of ease to the parish church of St Mary at Motcombe. The establishment of a church at Enmore Green was initiated through the efforts of the vicar of Gillingham, Rev. Henry Deane, who contributed £400 towards its construction. It was built on a centralised spot to serve the surrounding population of over 550 people.

Plans for the church were drawn up by George Alexander of London, with accommodation for 311 people and all seating free and unappropriated. Construction began in 1842, once enough funds had been raised to begin work. In April 1842, the Salisbury Diocesan Church Building Association granted £200 and the Incorporated Church Building Society granted £150 towards the church.

Built by Mr. Hale of Warminster, St John's and its churchyard was consecrated by the Bishop of Salisbury, the Right Rev. Edward Denison, on 10 August 1843. During the offertory, a further £75 was raised towards the building fund, which at the time of consecration still had over £400 to raise.

An extension of the churchyard was made in 1896 and consecrated by the Bishop of Salisbury, the Right Rev. John Wordsworth, on 9 November 1896. In 1944, the Enmore Green Parochial Church Council approached Shaftesbury Town Council to ascertain whether they would be prepared to sell some land for an extension of the churchyard. An agreement was reached the following year, with the Town Council selling approximately one acre of the adjacent land used as allotments.

The church has undergone reordering in the early 21st-century. A toilet and kitchen was added by the vestry in the south transept in 2004, and a side ramp was added leading up to the church entrance to provide disabled access. In 2011, due to woodworm infestation, the nave floor was replaced and the pews replaced with chairs, which has allowed the church to be used as an events space in addition to worship. The nearby church hall was used for worship and social events while the work was carried out.

== Architecture ==
St John's is built of local Greensand stone, with roofs covered in blue slate tiles. It has a cruciform plan, made up of a three-bay nave, north and south transepts, apsidal chancel and a one-stage crossing tower. Each face of the tower has two bell openings, and the top has an embattled parapet with corbel table below. Internally, the walls are white-painted and the roof is of stained deal. Both transepts and the west end of the nave contain galleries dating to 1843. Those belonging to the transepts were originally accessed by stair turrets on the outside of the church.

The nave has three single-light, round-arched windows on each side, all of the same design. The chancel has three single-light, round-arched windows, each widely spaced and with stained glass. Both transepts have three-light windows, with a single-light one above in the gable. The west gable, above the church's entrance, has a circular window with star-pattern tracery.

Fittings include the 15th-century stone font, which has a square bowl and pedestal. The font cover is of oak and has 15th-century origins too. The oak pulpit was installed in the church in 1948. The organ, undated, was built by Geo Osmond & Co Ltd of Taunton. The pews in the galleries are of stained pine; the benches of the nave were of the same material (removed in 2011).
