= All Saints' Church, Chalbury =

Church in Dorset, England

All Saints' Church
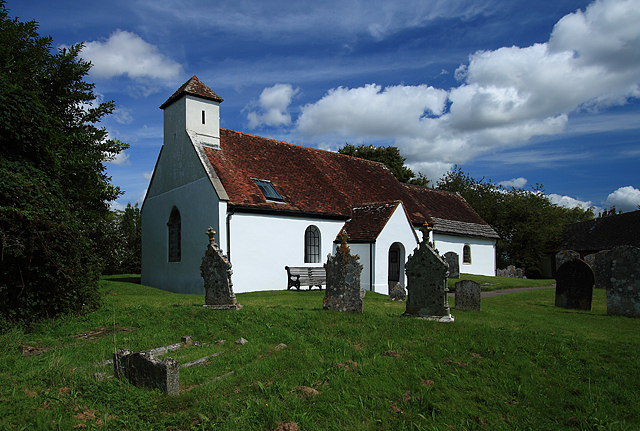

Religion
- Affiliation: Church of England
- Ecclesiastical or organizational status: Active

Location
- Location: Chalbury, Dorset, England
- Interactive map of All Saints' Church
- Coordinates: 50.8610°N 1.9749°W

Architecture
- Type: Church

All Saints' Church is a Church of England church in Chalbury, Dorset, England. It has 13th-century origins, with later alterations and additions, and many 18th-century furnishings. The church is a Grade I listed building. In the churchyard, an early 19th-century table tomb of the Long family is Grade II listed.

== History ==
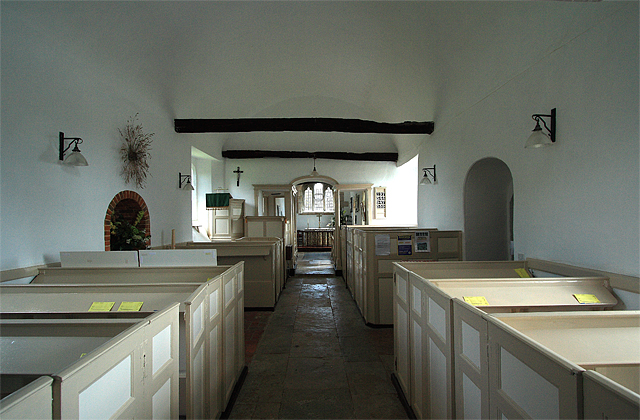
The interior of All Saints' Church.

All Saints' Church has been dated to the 13th-century, with the nave and chancel dating to this period. During the 16th-century, the nave's north wall was rebuilt and extensive repairs were made to the church in 1702. Further repairs and additions were made over the course of the 18th-century, including the construction of the north vestry and south porch. The church was also refitted during the 18th-century and retains much of its furnishing from that time.

A new organ was opened at the church on 5 July 1878. It was paid for by subscriptions from the patron, Lord Pembroke, the landowners, Lord Shaftesbury and Lord Alington, the Rector, Rev. George Henry Billington, and a number of other principal parishioners and supporters, including Lady Edith Ashley, Lady Charlotte Lyster, Lord Ashley, Mr. R. C. L. Bevan, Mr. A. Girdwood, Mr. Robert Cooke and Mr. W. F. Burnley. It was built by Messrs Bryceson Brothers and Ellis of London.

The churchyard was extended in c. 1892. In c. 1957, church repairs were carried out to the plans of William Henry Randoll Blacking of Salisbury. The Incorporated Church Building Society provided a grant towards the work. Today the church holds a Communion service every fifth Sunday of the month, in addition to other special services.

== Architecture ==
All Saints' is built of flint and rubble, with ashlar dressings. The roofs are largely covered in tiles, with some use of stone slate. Much of the church's exterior is now rendered and whitewashed, while parts have been refaced in brick. The church is made up of a nave, chancel, north vestry and south porch. The west gable has a roofed bell-cot containing a single bell, cast by R. Wells and dating to the 18th-century.

The nave's north wall contains two one-light windows dating to the 16th-century, the south wall has two round-headed windows of the 18th-century, and the west wall has one round-headed window of the same date. The nave has a plastered barrel-vaulted roof. The chancel's east window is 14th-century, the south wall has two 18th-century windows and the north wall contains a blocked lancet of 13th-century date. The chancel's roof has two moulded tie-beams dating to the 16th-century and an 18th-century barrel-vault ceiling. The chancel arch, shaped like a Palladian window, was remodelled in the 18th-century. It has an elliptical arch and Tuscan columns.

The church has two fonts: one with a 15th-century octagonal stone bowl and panelled stem, set on an 18th-century marble base, and the other a gadrooned font dating to the 18th-century. The polygonal pulpit, with panelled sides and moulded cornice, is made of pine and dates to the 18th-century. The 18th-century west gallery holds the 1878 organ. The nave's panelled box pews date to the 18th-century and are made of pine, with some reused oak panels of an older date. The chancel has an 18th-century raised bench pew with a balustraded front and a canopy supported by pilasters. The communion rails were presented to the church by the Dorset Historic Churches Trust in 1974 in dedication of their first chairman, Sir Owen Morshead.

In the chancel, there are floor slabs to Henry Dalicourt, dated 1708, and his daughter, Lucy Duke, dated 1774. In the nave is a floor slab to Alexander Arney, dated 1669.
