= Grade I listed buildings in Dorset =

There are over 9,000 Grade I listed buildings in England. This is a list of these buildings and structures in the county of Dorset, grouped first by the two unitary authority areas: first Bournemouth, Christchurch and Poole, then Dorset.

== Bournemouth, Christchurch and Poole ==
=== Bournemouth ===
Name	Location	Type	Completed (Note: The date given is the date used by Historic England as significant for the initial building or that of an important part in the structure's description.)	Date designated	Grid ref. (Note: The grid reference is based on the British national grid reference system, sometimes known as OSGB36, used by the Ordnance Survey.) Geo-coordinates	Entry number (Note: The "List Entry Number" is a unique number assigned to each listed building and scheduled monument by Historic England.)	Image
Church of St Clement	Boscombe, Bournemouth	Church	1871–73	5 May 1952	SZ1072892127; 50°43′43″N 1°50′58″W	1324751	Church of St Clement More images
Church of St Peter	Bournemouth	Church	1851	5 May 1952	SZ0888391216; 50°43′14″N 1°52′32″W	1153014	Church of St Peter More images
Church of St Stephen	Bournemouth	Church	1881–83	5 May 1952	SZ0852391507; 50°43′23″N 1°52′50″W	1324756	Church of St Stephen More images

=== Christchurch ===
Name	Location	Type	Completed	Date designated	Grid ref. Geo-coordinates	Entry number	Image
Christchurch Priory and Parish Church	Christchurch	Parish church	11th century	14 October 1953	SZ1603192531; 50°43′56″N 1°46′27″W	1110141	Christchurch Priory and Parish Church More images
Highcliffe Castle	Christchurch	Country house	1830–34	14 October 1953	SZ2028693208; 50°44′17″N 1°42′50″W	1110077	Highcliffe Castle More images
Christchurch Castle	Christchurch	Castle	1100–35	14 October 1953	SZ1596892661; 50°44′00″N 1°46′30″W	1153159	Christchurch Castle More images
The Constable's House	Christchurch	House	12th century	14 October 1953	SZ1605092706; 50°44′02″N 1°46′26″W	1325069	The Constable's House More images
Redford Bridge	Christchurch	Bridge	15th century	14 October 1953	SZ160927; 50°44′02″N 1°46′27″W	1304408	Redford Bridge More images
Town Bridge	Christchurch	Bridge	15th or 16th century	14 October 1953	SZ1606992753; 50°44′03″N 1°46′25″W	1460801	Town Bridge More images
Waterloo Bridge	Christchurch	Bridge	1816–17	14 October 1953	SZ1625692833; 50°44′06″N 1°46′16″W	1304449	Waterloo Bridge More images

=== Poole ===
Name	Location	Type	Completed	Date designated	Grid ref. Geo-coordinates	Entry number	Image
Canford School	Canford Magna, Poole	Country house	1825–36	14 June 1954	SZ0335098917; 50°47′23″N 1°57′14″W	1217460	Canford School More images
John of Gaunt's Kitchen, Canford School	Canford Magna	Kitchen block	15th century	14 June 1954	SZ0339598937; 50°47′24″N 1°57′12″W	1217462	John of Gaunt's Kitchen, Canford School
Nineveh Court, attached carriage arch and screen wall, Canford School	Canford Magna	Sculpture gallery	1851	14 June 1954	SZ0341498941; 50°47′24″N 1°57′11″W	1217464	Nineveh Court, attached carriage arch and screen wall, Canford School
Merley House	Poole	Country house	1752–60	14 June 1954	SZ0086498321; 50°47′04″N 1°59′21″W	1275387	Merley House More images
Scaplen's Court	Poole	House	Late 15th to early 16th century	14 June 1954	SZ0087990359; 50°42′46″N 1°59′20″W	1275378	Scaplen's Court More images
Parish Church of Canford Magna	Canford Magna	Parish church	c.1200	14 June 1954	SZ0319498812; 50°47′20″N 1°57′22″W	1217465	Parish Church of Canford Magna More images
Sir Peter Thompson House	Poole	House	1746–49	14 June 1954	SZ0104890692; 50°42′57″N 1°59′11″W	1224145	Sir Peter Thompson House More images
The Waterfront Museum, Local History Centre	Poole	Warehouse	First half of the 15th century	14 June 1954	SZ0086190313; 50°42′45″N 1°59′21″W	1217514	The Waterfront Museum, Local History Centre More images

== Dorset (unitary authority) ==
=== Eastern Dorset ===
Name	Location	Type	Completed	Date designated	Grid ref. Geo-coordinates	Entry number	Image
Church of All Saints	Chalbury	Parish church	13th-century origin	18 March 1955	SU0185606840; 50°51′40″N 1°58′30″W	1120141	Church of All Saints More images
Church of St Mary and St Bartholomew	Cranborne	Parish church	12th century	18 March 1955	SU0545313247; 50°55′07″N 1°55′26″W	1120181	Church of St Mary and St Bartholomew More images
Cranborne Manor House	Cranborne	Hunting lodge	c.1207–08	18 March 1955	SU0531313228; 50°55′07″N 1°55′33″W	1120172	Cranborne Manor House More images
Church of All Saints	Gussage All Saints	Parish church	14th century	18 March 1955	ST9984510827; 50°53′49″N 2°00′13″W	1304213	Church of All Saints More images
Church of St Michael	Gussage St Michael	Parish church	12th-century tower	18 March 1955	ST9858511332; 50°54′05″N 2°01′17″W	1120146	Church of St Michael More images
Church of St Wolfrida	Horton	Parish church	Possible 12th or 13th-century origin	18 March 1955	SU0301507447; 50°51′59″N 1°57′31″W	1154780	Church of St Wolfrida More images
Crichel House	Moor Crichel	Country house	1743	18 March 1955	ST9942908324; 50°52′28″N 2°00′34″W	1120155	Crichel House More images
Julian's Bridge	Pamphill	Bridge	Probably late 15th century	14 June 1952	SZ0035899846; 50°47′53″N 1°59′47″W	1323805	Julian's Bridge More images
Kingston Lacy House	Pamphill	House	1663–65	18 March 1955	ST9785301268; 50°48′39″N 2°01′55″W	1119511	Kingston Lacy House More images
Parish Church of Saint Bartholomew	Shapwick	Parish church	12th-century origin	18 March 1955	ST9365601675; 50°48′53″N 2°05′29″W	1323469	Parish Church of Saint Bartholomew More images
White Mill Bridge	Sturminster Marshall	Bridge	16th century	18 March 1955	ST9576700552; 50°48′16″N 2°03′41″W	1120035	White Mill Bridge More images
Church of St Andrew	Gussage St Andrew, Sixpenny Handley	Chapel of ease	12th century	18 March 1955	ST9760714254; 50°55′40″N 2°02′08″W	1153744	Church of St Andrew More images
Church of St Mary	Almer, Sturminster Marshall	Parish church	12th century	18 March 1955	SY9131798933; 50°47′24″N 2°07′28″W	1154550	Church of St Mary More images
Dean's Court	Wimborne Minster	Country house	1725	14 June 1952	SZ0098999700; 50°47′49″N 1°59′14″W	1119561	Dean's Court More images
The Minster Church of St Cuthburga	Wimborne Minster	Collegiate church	12th century	14 June 1952	SZ0094599932; 50°47′56″N 1°59′17″W	1119581	The Minster Church of St Cuthburga More images
Church of St Giles	Wimborne St Giles	Parish church	1732	18 March 1955	SU0319111960; 50°54′26″N 1°57′22″W	1120134	Church of St Giles More images
St Giles House	Wimborne St Giles	Country house	17th century	18 March 1955	SU0323611591; 50°54′14″N 1°57′19″W	1120129	St Giles House More images

=== Northern Dorset ===
Name	Location	Type	Completed	Date designated	Grid ref. Geo-coordinates	Entry number	Image
Anderson Manor	Anderson	Manor house	1622	14 July 1955	SY8802197604; 50°46′40″N 2°10′17″W	1118633	Anderson Manor More images
Church of Saint Andrew	Winterborne Tomson, Anderson	Parish church	12th century	14 July 1955	SY8847597424; 50°46′35″N 2°09′53″W	1118600	Church of Saint Andrew More images
Church of St Peter and St Paul	Blandford Forum	Parish church	1732–39	27 October 1950	ST8856406311; 50°51′22″N 2°09′50″W	1251913	Church of St Peter and St Paul More images
Coupar House	Blandford Forum	House	Mid-18th century	27 October 1950	ST8854906388; 50°51′25″N 2°09′51″W	1152976	Coupar House More images
Greyhound House	Blandford Forum	Inn	1753	27 October 1950	ST8845106270; 50°51′21″N 2°09′56″W	1152922	Greyhound House More images
Pump House	Blandford Forum	Portico	1760	27 October 1950	ST8853406296; 50°51′22″N 2°09′51″W	1324829	Pump House More images
The Old House	Blandford Forum	House	Mid-17th century	27 October 1950	ST8868006416; 50°51′26″N 2°09′44″W	1108699	The Old House More images
Town Hall and Corn Exchange	Blandford Forum	Town hall	1734	27 October 1950	ST8849406328; 50°51′23″N 2°09′53″W	1324806	Town Hall and Corn Exchange More images
18 and 20, Market Place	Blandford Forum	Inn	18th century	27 October 1950	ST8851606273; 50°51′21″N 2°09′52″W	1108646	18 and 20, Market Place More images
26, Market Place (Bastard House)	Blandford Forum	House	18th century	7 September 1973	ST8854606276; 50°51′21″N 2°09′51″W	1108648	26, Market Place (Bastard House) More images
Bryanston School	Bryanston	Country house	1889–94	11 June 1985	ST8703907370; 50°51′56″N 2°11′08″W	1305449	Bryanston School More images
The Portman Chapel	Bryanston Old Buildings, Bryanston	Parish church	1745	14 July 1955	ST8746607054; 50°51′46″N 2°10′46″W	1110183	The Portman Chapel More images
Church of St Mary	Charlton Marshall	Parish church	15th-century tower	14 July 1955	ST9003804074; 50°50′10″N 2°08′34″W	1171867	Church of St Mary More images
Chettle House	Chettle	Country house	c.1710	14 July 1955	ST9514013184; 50°55′05″N 2°04′14″W	1118513	Chettle House More images
Tower of the former Church of St Mary	East Compton, Compton Abbas	Tower	Late 15th century	16 August 1960	ST8755918800; 50°58′07″N 2°10′43″W	1172395	Tower of the former Church of St Mary More images
Church of St Mary	Gillingham	Parish church	14th century	16 August 1960	ST8064326582; 51°02′18″N 2°16′39″W	1172499	Church of St Mary More images
Church of St Paul	Hammoon	Parish church	Late 12th or early 13th century	24 June 1985	ST8178414576; 50°55′49″N 2°15′38″W	1324608	Church of St Paul More images
Church of St Mary and St James	Droop, Hazelbury Bryan	Parish church	15th century	4 October 1960	ST7532508287; 50°52′25″N 2°21′07″W	1110493	Church of St Mary and St James More images
Parish Church of All Saints	Hilton	Parish church	15th-century tower	14 July 1955	ST7816202975; 50°49′33″N 2°18′41″W	1118613	Parish Church of All Saints More images
Church of St Mary	Iwerne Courtney	Parish church	14th century	14 July 1955	ST8598912415; 50°54′40″N 2°12′02″W	1305327	Church of St Mary More images
Ranston	Ranston, Iwerne Courtney	Country house	1753	14 July 1955	ST8628212356; 50°54′38″N 2°11′47″W	1305285	Upload Photo
Church of St Mary	Iwerne Minster	Parish church	12th century	16 August 1960	ST8683414465; 50°55′46″N 2°11′19″W	1110192	Church of St Mary More images
West Lodge (that part in the parish of Iwerne Minster)	Iwerne Minster	Country house	18th century	24 June 1985	ST8941515742; 50°56′28″N 2°09′07″W	1172300	Upload Photo
Stepleton House	Iwerne Stepleton	Country house	Early to mid-17th century	14 July 1955	ST8633311294; 50°54′03″N 2°11′45″W	1110203	Stepleton House More images
Church of St Nicholas	Manston	Parish church	Early 13th century	4 October 1960	ST8164615049; 50°56′05″N 2°15′45″W	1110434	Church of St Nicholas More images
Church of St Peter and St Paul	Mappowder	Parish church	Late 15th century	4 October 1960	ST7353805987; 50°51′10″N 2°22′38″W	1287754	Church of St Peter and St Paul More images
Church of St Gregory	Marnhull	Parish church	12th century	4 October 1960	ST7815118717; 50°58′03″N 2°18′45″W	1172545	Church of St Gregory More images
Abbey Church of St Mary, St Sansom and St Branwalader	Milton Abbey, Milton Abbas	Abbey church	14th century	14 July 1955	ST7983202296; 50°49′11″N 2°17′16″W	1304822	Abbey Church of St Mary, St Sansom and St Branwalader More images
Chapel of Saint Catherine	Milton Abbey, Milton Abbas	Abbey chapel	Late 12th century	14 July 1955	ST8011902343; 50°49′13″N 2°17′01″W	1304728	Chapel of Saint Catherine More images
Milton Abbey School	Milton Abbey, Milton Abbas	Country house	1771–76	26 June 1953	ST7985402377; 50°49′14″N 2°17′15″W	1118566	Milton Abbey School More images
The Abbot's Hall and Kitchen, Milton Abbey	Milton Abbey, Milton Abbas	Great hall	c.1498	26 June 1953	ST7985302339; 50°49′13″N 2°17′15″W	1152407	The Abbot's Hall and Kitchen, Milton Abbey More images
Park Wall	Gold Hill, Shaftesbury	Boundary wall	c.1365	20 June 1952	ST8626222881; 51°00′19″N 2°11′50″W	1108773	Park Wall More images
The remains of Shaftesbury Abbey	Shaftesbury	Abbey	888	20 June 1952	ST8616322886; 51°00′19″N 2°11′55″W	1108779	The remains of Shaftesbury Abbey More images
Church of the Holy Rood	Shillingstone	Parish church	Early 12th century	4 October 1960	ST8247411470; 50°54′09″N 2°15′02″W	1324658	Church of the Holy Rood More images
Church of St Nicholas	Silton	Parish church	Late 12th century	16 August 1960	ST7826429344; 51°03′47″N 2°18′42″W	1304821	Church of St Nicholas More images
Church of St John	Spetisbury	Parish church	Late 12th or early 13th century	14 July 1955	ST9094102924; 50°49′33″N 2°07′48″W	1305220	Church of St John More images
Crawford Bridge	Spetisbury	Road bridge	Medieval	14 July 1955	ST9189901978; 50°49′02″N 2°06′59″W	1305264	Crawford Bridge More images
Church of St Michael	Stour Provost	Parish church	Possibly 13th century origin	16 August 1960	ST7940221572; 50°59′35″N 2°17′42″W	1110379	Church of St Michael More images
Parish Church of St Peter	Stourton Caundle	Parish church	13th century	4 October 1960	ST7145215198; 50°56′08″N 2°24′28″W	1228147	Parish Church of St Peter More images
Church of St Mary	Sturminster Newton	Parish church	c.1400	4 October 1960	ST7880413950; 50°55′29″N 2°18′11″W	1324486	Church of St Mary More images
Fiddleford Mill House	Sturminster Newton	Manor house	Late 14th century	4 October 1960	ST8008213580; 50°55′17″N 2°17′05″W	1324484	Fiddleford Mill House More images
Town Bridge	Sturminster Newton	Road bridge	Late 15th or early 16th century	4 October 1960	ST7844913573; 50°55′16″N 2°18′29″W	1110531	Town Bridge More images
Church of St Mary	Tarrant Crawford	Parish church	12th century	26 June 1953	ST9229603467; 50°49′50″N 2°06′39″W	1110840	Church of St Mary More images
Eastbury House including attached west courtyard and gateway	Eastbury, Tarrant Gunville	Service wing	1717–38	14 July 1955	ST9323012707; 50°54′50″N 2°05′52″W	1324303	Eastbury House including attached west courtyard and gateway More images
Church of St Mary	Tarrant Hinton	Parish church	14th century	14 July 1955	ST9362511150; 50°53′59″N 2°05′31″W	1118497	Church of St Mary More images
Manor House	Winterborne Clenston	Manor house	Early 16th century	14 July 1955	ST8387203130; 50°49′39″N 2°13′49″W	1172313	Manor House More images
Manor Farm Barn	Winterborne Clenston	Barn	Late 16th century	14 July 1955	ST8384903036; 50°49′36″N 2°13′50″W	1110166	Manor Farm Barn More images
Church of St Mary	Winterborne Stickland	Parish church	13th century	14 July 1955	ST8346004626; 50°50′27″N 2°14′11″W	1305111	Church of St Mary More images
Church of St Mary	Winterborne Whitechurch	Parish church	Early 13th century	14 July 1955	ST8360600121; 50°48′01″N 2°14′02″W	1118538	Church of St Mary More images

=== Southern Dorset ===
Name	Location	Type	Completed	Date designated	Grid ref. Geo-coordinates	Entry number	Image
Parish Church of St Laurence	Affpuddle	Parish church	15th century	20 November 1959	SY8053493710; 50°44′34″N 2°16′38″W	1323317	Parish Church of St Laurence More images
Parish Church of St Nicholas	Arne	Parish church	13th century	20 November 1959	SY9723888127; 50°41′34″N 2°02′26″W	1323421	Parish Church of St Nicholas More images
Parish Church of St John the Baptist	Southbrook, Bere Regis	Parish church	16th century	20 November 1959	SY8474294756; 50°45′08″N 2°13′04″W	1170978	Parish Church of St John the Baptist More images
Bloxworth House, including the attached wall and gate piers on east	Bloxworth	Country house	1608	20 November 1959	SY8793494961; 50°45′15″N 2°10′21″W	1171112	Bloxworth House, including the attached wall and gate piers on east
Parish Church of St Andrew	Bloxworth	Parish church	14th century	20 November 1959	SY8805694715; 50°45′07″N 2°10′14″W	1171073	Parish Church of St Andrew More images
Barnston Manor, including attached farm building on south-east	Barnston, Church Knowle	Manor house	16th century	20 November 1959	SY9307681537; 50°38′01″N 2°05′57″W	1120351	Barnston Manor, including attached farm building on south-east More images
Corfe Castle	The Square, Corfe Castle	Castle	14th century	20 November 1959	SY9591282286; 50°38′25″N 2°03′33″W	1121000	Corfe Castle More images
Parish Church of Saint James	Kingston	Parish church	c.1880	20 November 1959	SY9555679539; 50°36′56″N 2°03′51″W	1120984	Parish Church of Saint James More images
Lulworth Castle	Lulworth Park, East Lulworth	Hunting lodge	c.1608	20 November 1959	SY8531482172; 50°38′21″N 2°12′33″W	1323323	Lulworth Castle More images
Roman Catholic Chapel of St Mary	Lulworth Park, East Lulworth	Private chapel	1786–87	20 November 1959	SY8524882273; 50°38′24″N 2°12′36″W	1323322	Roman Catholic Chapel of St Mary More images
Parish Church of St Mary the Virgin	Lytchett Matravers	Parish church	c.1500	20 November 1959	SY9359196169; 50°45′54″N 2°05′32″W	1171322	Parish Church of St Mary the Virgin More images
Charborough Park	Morden	Country house	Mid-17th century	20 November 1959	SY9257397886; 50°46′50″N 2°06′24″W	1323286	Charborough Park More images
Moreton House	Moreton	House	1742–45	20 November 1959	SY8063289152; 50°42′06″N 2°16′32″W	1305008	Moreton House More images
Creech Grange	Steeple	Manor house	16th-century origin	20 November 1959	SY9112482247; 50°38′23″N 2°07′37″W	1304916	Creech Grange More images
Parish Church of St Michael	Steeple	Parish church	17th century	20 November 1959	SY9113680905; 50°37′40″N 2°07′36″W	1152213	Parish Church of St Michael More images
Parish Church of Saint Nicholas	Studland	Parish church	12th century	20 November 1959	SZ0364382511; 50°38′32″N 1°56′59″W	1120271	Parish Church of Saint Nicholas More images
Godlingston Manor	Swanage	Cross passage house	c.1300	26 June 1952	SZ0148580221; 50°37′18″N 1°58′49″W	1323633	Upload Photo
Church of St Martin	Wareham	Parish church	c.1030	7 May 1952	SY9221987697; 50°41′20″N 2°06′41″W	1153149	Church of St Martin More images
Holy Trinity Gallery (former Church of Holy Trinity)	Wareham	Church	14th century	7 May 1952	SY9234087212; 50°41′04″N 2°06′35″W	1153598	Holy Trinity Gallery (former Church of Holy Trinity) More images
No 9, South St (the Manor House) including garden wall	Wareham	House	1712	7 May 1952	SY9236987326; 50°41′08″N 2°06′34″W	1323598	No 9, South St (the Manor House) including garden wall More images
Parish Church of Lady St Mary	Wareham	Parish church	Probably early 16th century	7 May 1952	SY9249087193; 50°41′04″N 2°06′28″W	1120029	Parish Church of Lady St Mary More images
Remains of Bindon Abbey	Wool	Abbey	Late 12th to mid-13th century	20 November 1959	SY8540086814; 50°40′51″N 2°12′29″W	1120360	Upload Photo
Parish Church of Saint Nicholas	Worth Matravers	Parish church	14th century	20 November 1959	SY9728277443; 50°35′48″N 2°02′23″W	1120262	Parish Church of Saint Nicholas More images
St Aldhelm's Chapel	Worth Matravers	Chapel of ease	12th century	20 November 1959	SY9607175559; 50°34′47″N 2°03′25″W	1120256	St Aldhelm's Chapel More images

=== Western Dorset ===
Name	Location	Type	Completed	Date designated	Grid ref. Geo-coordinates	Entry number	Image
Abbotsbury Abbey remains of north wall	Abbotsbury	Wall	15th century	26 January 1956	SY5775085194; 50°39′54″N 2°35′57″W	1118743	Abbotsbury Abbey remains of north wall More images
Abbotsbury Abbey Dairy House	Abbotsbury	Gatehouse	Late 14th century	26 January 1956	SY5771285116; 50°39′51″N 2°35′59″W	1118706	Abbotsbury Abbey Dairy House More images
Abbotsbury Abbey Malt House	Abbotsbury	Abbey building	c.1400	26 January 1956	SY5783585158; 50°39′52″N 2°35′53″W	1118747	Upload Photo
Abbotsbury Abbey Tithe Barn	Abbotsbury	Tithe barn	c.1400	26 January 1956	SY5779385023; 50°39′48″N 2°35′55″W	1305209	Abbotsbury Abbey Tithe Barn More images
Chapel of St Catherine	Abbotsbury	Chapel	c.1400	26 January 1956	SY5725484836; 50°39′42″N 2°36′22″W	1172576	Chapel of St Catherine More images
Church of St Nicholas	Abbotsbury	Parish church	14th century	26 January 1956	SY5776685209; 50°39′54″N 2°35′56″W	1305224	Church of St Nicholas More images
Athelhampton Hall	Athelhampton	Manor house	16th century	26 January 1956	SY7706194274; 50°44′51″N 2°19′35″W	1323995	Athelhampton Hall More images
Parish Church of St Mary	Batcombe	Parish church	15th century	31 July 1961	ST6185803867; 50°49′59″N 2°32′35″W	1118654	Parish Church of St Mary More images
Church of St Mary	Beaminster	Parish church	13th century	11 November 1966	ST4789601244; 50°48′30″N 2°44′27″W	1219595	Church of St Mary More images
Parnham House	Parnham, Beaminster	Country house	Mid-16th century	12 June 1953	ST4751300284; 50°47′59″N 2°44′46″W	1221178	Parnham House More images
Parish Church of Holy Trinity	Bincombe	Parish church	Late 12th century	26 January 1956	SY6864484558; 50°39′35″N 2°26′42″W	1119256	Parish Church of Holy Trinity More images
Church of St Peter and St Paul	Bishop's Caundle	Parish church	14th century	31 July 1961	ST6961813157; 50°55′01″N 2°26′01″W	1118887	Church of St Peter and St Paul More images
Old Holy Trinity Church	Bothenhampton	Parish church	15th century	5 September 1960	SY4752991753; 50°43′23″N 2°44′41″W	1324171	Old Holy Trinity Church More images
Churchyard cross 7 metres north-west of tower of Church of St Mary	Bradford Abbas	Cross	Late 15th century	31 July 1961	ST5872214290; 50°55′36″N 2°35′19″W	1323880	Upload Photo
Parish Church of St Mary	Bradford Abbas	Parish church	c.12th century	31 July 1961	ST5874014278; 50°55′35″N 2°35′18″W	1323858	Parish Church of St Mary More images
Parish Church of St Mary	Bridport	Parish church	13th century	28 November 1950	SY4657792595; 50°43′50″N 2°45′30″W	1228336	Parish Church of St Mary More images
Town Hall	Bridport	Town hall	1786	28 November 1950	SY4659192922; 50°44′00″N 2°45′29″W	1227851	Town Hall More images
Church of the Holy Rood	Buckland Newton	Parish church	15th century	26 January 1956	ST6877105268; 50°50′46″N 2°26′42″W	1118892	Church of the Holy Rood More images
Parish Church of St Mary	Burton Bradstock	Parish church	14th century	5 September 1960	SY4886489492; 50°42′10″N 2°43′32″W	1213878	Parish Church of St Mary More images
Sherborne Castle	Castleton, Sherborne	Country house	Late 16th century	11 July 1951	ST6491416404; 50°56′46″N 2°30′03″W	1153912	Sherborne Castle More images
Sherborne Old Castle	Castleton, Sherborne	Bishop's palace	1107–35	11 July 1951	ST6480616780; 50°56′58″N 2°30′09″W	1119378	Sherborne Old Castle More images
Chantmarle (Police Training College)	Cattistock	Manor house	15th century	19 November 1985	ST5892102203; 50°49′04″N 2°35′04″W	1119452	Chantmarle (Police Training College) More images
Parish Church of Saint Peter and Saint Paul	Cattistock	Parish church	15th century, rebuilt 1857	26 January 1956	SY5914699525; 50°47′38″N 2°34′52″W	1118659	Parish Church of Saint Peter and Saint Paul More images
Cerne Abbey	Cerne Abbas	House	15th-century fragments	26 January 1956	ST6653001355; 50°48′39″N 2°28′35″W	1323849	Cerne Abbey More images
Churchyard Cross	Cerne Abbas	Cross	15th century	26 January 1956	ST6657201365; 50°48′39″N 2°28′33″W	1119471	Churchyard Cross More images
Guest House of Cerne Abbey	Cerne Abbas	Cruck house	Late 15th century	26 January 1956	ST6655301376; 50°48′39″N 2°28′34″W	1119470	Guest House of Cerne Abbey More images
Parish Church of St Mary	Cerne Abbas	Parish church	14th century	26 January 1956	ST6659501215; 50°48′34″N 2°28′32″W	1323846	Parish Church of St Mary More images
The Abbot's Porch, Cerne Abbey	Cerne Abbas	Porch	1497–1509	26 January 1956	ST6653801409; 50°48′41″N 2°28′35″W	1152342	The Abbot's Porch, Cerne Abbey More images
The Tithe Barn	Cerne Abbas	Tithe barn	Late 14th century	26 January 1956	ST6629401007; 50°48′27″N 2°28′47″W	1119439	The Tithe Barn More images
3 & 5 Abbey St, Abbey Cottage and The Pitchmarket	Cerne Abbas	Abbey tenements	Early 16th century	26 January 1956	ST6656701204; 50°48′34″N 2°28′33″W	1119467	3 & 5 Abbey St, Abbey Cottage and The Pitchmarket More images
7 Abbey Street	Cerne Abbas	Abbey tenements	Early 16th century	26 January 1956	ST6656401219; 50°48′34″N 2°28′33″W	1304868	7 Abbey Street More images
9 Abbey Street	Cerne Abbas	Abbey tenements	Early 16th century	26 January 1956	ST6656101235; 50°48′35″N 2°28′33″W	1323848	9 Abbey Street More images
Parish Church of St Mary	Charminster	Parish church	12th century	26 January 1956	SY6792392698; 50°43′59″N 2°27′21″W	1324019	Parish Church of St Mary More images
Wolfeton House	Wolfeton, Charminster	Manor house	16th century	20 September 1954	SY6782892127; 50°43′40″N 2°27′26″W	1324021	Wolfeton House More images
Parish Church of St Martin	Cheselbourne	Parish church	Late 13th century	26 January 1956	SY7621699586; 50°47′43″N 2°20′20″W	1324023	Parish Church of St Martin More images
Chideock Parish Church (St Giles)	Chideock	Parish church	14th century	5 September 1960	SY4215092868; 50°43′57″N 2°49′16″W	1288169	Chideock Parish Church (St Giles) More images
Parish Church (dedication unknown)	Chilcombe	Parish church	12th century	5 September 1960	SY5287791086; 50°43′03″N 2°40′08″W	1288566	Parish Church (dedication unknown) More images
Clifton House	Clifton Maybank	Manor house	Mid-16th century	11 July 1951	ST5762813910; 50°55′23″N 2°36′15″W	1119383	Clifton House More images
Church of St Mary	Corscombe	Parish church	15th century	11 November 1966	ST5222904865; 50°50′29″N 2°40′47″W	1290242	Church of St Mary More images
Dewlish House	Dewlish	Country house	1702	26 January 1956	SY7709697431; 50°46′34″N 2°19′34″W	1154339	Dewlish House More images
Church of St George	Fordington, Dorchester	Parish church	12th century	8 May 1950	SY6985390559; 50°42′50″N 2°25′42″W	1292171	Church of St George More images
Church of St Peter. Railings on east and south sides of churchyard	Dorchester	Parish church	1420–21	8 May 1950	SY6924890737; 50°42′56″N 2°26′13″W	1119031	Church of St Peter. Railings on east and south sides of churchyard More images
Max Gate	Dorchester	House	1885	8 May 1970	SY7044189918; 50°42′29″N 2°25′12″W	1110618	Max Gate More images
Roman House	Dorchester	Roman house	4th century	8 May 1950	SY6895690964; 50°43′03″N 2°26′28″W	1210098	Roman House More images
Shire Hall	Dorchester	County hall	1797	8 May 1950	SY6910190736; 50°42′56″N 2°26′21″W	1119069	Shire Hall More images
Parish Church of St James	Lewcombe, East Chelborough	Parish church	12th century	11 November 1966	ST5589607557; 50°51′57″N 2°37′41″W	1119286	Parish Church of St James More images
Parish Church of the Holy Trinity	East Fleet	Parish church	1827–29	26 January 1956	SY6338380521; 50°37′24″N 2°31′08″W	1152080	Parish Church of the Holy Trinity More images
Parish Church of St Lawrence	Folke	Parish church	1628	31 July 1961	ST6597013270; 50°55′04″N 2°29′08″W	1172612	Parish Church of St Lawrence More images
Church of St Mary	Frampton	Parish church	15th century	26 January 1956	SY6269594969; 50°45′11″N 2°31′49″W	1288540	Church of St Mary More images
Parish Church of St Mary	Frome St Quintin	Parish church	13th century	26 January 1956	ST5989002668; 50°49′20″N 2°34′15″W	1323860	Parish Church of St Mary More images
Church of Holy Trinity	Godmanstone	Parish church	12th century	26 January 1956	SY6658997373; 50°46′30″N 2°28′31″W	1215038	Church of Holy Trinity More images
Church of the Assumption of the Blessed Virgin Mary	Holnest	Parish church	Late 14th or early 15th century	31 July 1961	ST6561309818; 50°53′13″N 2°29′25″W	1118875	Church of the Assumption of the Blessed Virgin Mary More images
Church of St Lawrence	The Borough, Holwell	Parish church	Late 15th century	21 May 1984	ST6994011966; 50°54′23″N 2°25′44″W	1152109	Church of St Lawrence More images
Parish Church of St Giles	Hooke	Parish church	15th century	11 November 1966	ST5354700167; 50°47′57″N 2°39′38″W	1119416	Parish Church of St Giles More images
Kingston Russell House	Lower Kingston Russell	Country house	Late 17th century	26 January 1956	SY5719089549; 50°42′14″N 2°36′27″W	1118704	Kingston Russell House More images
Chapel of the Holy Trinity	Leweston	Chapel	1616	11 July 1951	ST6367712358; 50°54′34″N 2°31′05″W	1153840	Chapel of the Holy Trinity More images
Church of St Martin, including churchyard boundary wall	Lower Lillington	Parish church	15th century	31 July 1961	ST6294912712; 50°54′46″N 2°31′42″W	1304066	Church of St Martin, including churchyard boundary wall More images
Parish Church of St Mary	Litton Cheney	Parish church	15th century	5 September 1960	SY5516790723; 50°42′52″N 2°38′11″W	1214851	Parish Church of St Mary More images
Parish Church of St Mary Magdelene	Loders	Parish church	14th century	5 September 1960	SY4911994273; 50°44′45″N 2°43′21″W	1288302	Parish Church of St Mary Magdelene More images
Parish Church of St Peter	Long Bredy	Parish church	13th century	26 January 1956	SY5706590585; 50°42′48″N 2°36′34″W	1118676	Parish Church of St Peter More images
Parish Church of St James	Longburton	Parish church	13th century	31 July 1961	ST6488712755; 50°54′47″N 2°30′03″W	1154083	Parish Church of St James More images
West Hall	Longburton	House	17th century	11 July 1951	ST6530912895; 50°54′52″N 2°29′41″W	1118868	West Hall More images
Parish Church of St Mary	Lower Wraxall	Parish church	12th century	11 November 1966	ST5757000828; 50°48′20″N 2°36′13″W	1156747	Parish Church of St Mary More images
Bridge 15 yards north-east of Buddle Bridge	Lyme Regis	Bridge	Late 12th or early 13th century	23 April 1952	SY3426692110; 50°43′30″N 2°55′57″W	1324343	Upload Photo
Buddle Bridge	Lyme Regis	Bridge	Probably 14th century	23 April 1952	SY3425192100; 50°43′29″N 2°55′58″W	1110811	Buddle Bridge More images
Congregational Church and forecourt wall	Lyme Regis	Congregational church	1750–55	31 January 1974	SY3417492276; 50°43′35″N 2°56′02″W	1278935	Congregational Church and forecourt wall More images
Parish Church of St Michael	Lyme Regis	Parish church	12th to 15th century	23 April 1952	SY3433592205; 50°43′33″N 2°55′54″W	1229389	Parish Church of St Michael More images
The Cobb piers and walls including north wall	Lyme Regis	Seawall	Shown in 16th-century sketch	23 April 1952	SY3384391509; 50°43′10″N 2°56′19″W	1229437	The Cobb piers and walls including north wall More images
Church of St Mary	Maiden Newton	Parish church	12th century	26 January 1956	SY5962997886; 50°46′45″N 2°34′26″W	1215134	Church of St Mary More images
Church of All Saints attached to Mapperton House	Mapperton	Parish church	c.12th century	11 November 1966	SY5034299659; 50°47′40″N 2°42′21″W	1215496	Church of All Saints attached to Mapperton House More images
Mapperton Manor House	Mapperton	Manor house	Mid-16th century	4 December 1951	SY5035399673; 50°47′40″N 2°42′21″W	1215471	Mapperton Manor House More images
North Stables	Mapperton	Stable	c.1670	4 December 1951	SY5030699688; 50°47′41″N 2°42′23″W	1215497	Upload Photo
South Stables (barn and cart shed)	Mapperton	Barn	1670	4 December 1951	SY5030199654; 50°47′40″N 2°42′23″W	1215498	South Stables (barn and cart shed) More images
Parish Church of St Mary	Melbury Bubb	Parish church	15th century	31 July 1961	ST5959506549; 50°51′25″N 2°34′31″W	1119274	Parish Church of St Mary More images
Parish Church of St Osmond	Melbury Osmond	Parish church	15th century	11 November 1966	ST5740007832; 50°52′06″N 2°36′24″W	1119242	Parish Church of St Osmond More images
Melbury House	Melbury Sampford	Country house	c.1530	4 December 1951	ST5764705989; 50°51′07″N 2°36′11″W	1119248	Melbury House More images
Parish Church of St Mary	Melbury House, Melbury Sampford	Parish church	15th century	11 November 1966	ST5773605971; 50°51′06″N 2°36′06″W	1323935	Parish Church of St Mary More images
Stable yard immediately north of Melbury House	Melbury Sampford	Stableyard	Late 17th century	2 June 1986	ST5758406023; 50°51′08″N 2°36′14″W	1323936	Upload Photo
Bingham's Melcombe House	Bingham's Melcombe, Melcombe Horsey	House	16th century	26 January 1956	ST7716902150; 50°49′06″N 2°19′32″W	1324138	Bingham's Melcombe House More images
Church of St Andrew	Bingham's Melcombe, Melcombe Horsey	Parish church	Mid-14th century	26 January 1956	ST7727502082; 50°49′04″N 2°19′26″W	1118852	Church of St Andrew More images
Higher Melcombe House with attached chapel	Higher Melcombe, Melcombe Horsey	Country house	Possibly 15th century	26 January 1956	ST7494402412; 50°49′15″N 2°21′25″W	1152413	Higher Melcombe House with attached chapel More images
Church of All Saints	Nether Cerne	Parish church	Late 13th century	26 January 1956	SY6699098206; 50°46′57″N 2°28′11″W	1216512	Church of All Saints More images
Parish Church of St Nicholas	Nether Compton	Parish church	13th century	31 July 1961	ST5983417244; 50°57′12″N 2°34′24″W	1323910	Parish Church of St Nicholas More images
Church of St Mary	Netherbury	Parish church	14th century	11 November 1966	SY4703299460; 50°47′32″N 2°45′10″W	1216095	Church of St Mary More images
Parish Church of St Michael	Over Compton	Parish church	15th century	31 July 1961	ST5946316894; 50°57′00″N 2°34′42″W	1119361	Parish Church of St Michael More images
Moignes Court	Owermoigne	Moated house	Late 13th century	26 January 1956	SY7704385714; 50°40′14″N 2°19′34″W	1119236	Upload Photo
Church of St Mary	Piddlehinton	Parish church	15th century	26 January 1956	SY7157097158; 50°46′24″N 2°24′16″W	1304468	Church of St Mary More images
Church of All Saints	Piddletrenthide	Parish church	c.1500	26 January 1956	ST7021100730; 50°48′19″N 2°25′27″W	1324151	Church of All Saints More images
Church of St Mary	Pilsdon	Parish church	Late 14th century, restored 19th century	11 November 1966	SY4146999551; 50°47′33″N 2°49′54″W	1216401	Church of St Mary More images
Parish Church of St Peter	Portesham	Parish church	13th century	26 January 1956	SY6025385840; 50°40′15″N 2°33′50″W	1152497	Parish Church of St Peter More images
Waddon Manor with courtyard walls, steps and gate-piers	Waddon, Portesham	Manor house	Late 17th century	26 January 1956	SY6201385790; 50°40′14″N 2°32′20″W	1324241	Waddon Manor with courtyard walls, steps and gate-piers More images
Mappercombe Manor House	Mappercombe, Powerstock	Manor house	17th century	4 December 1951	SY5120695122; 50°45′13″N 2°41′35″W	1216408	Mappercombe Manor House More images
Parish Church of St Mary	Powerstock	Parish church	14th century	11 November 1966	SY5170096192; 50°45′48″N 2°41′10″W	1216639	Parish Church of St Mary More images
Poxwell House	Poxwell	Manor house	Early 17th century	26 January 1956	SY7412284017; 50°39′19″N 2°22′03″W	1304095	Poxwell House More images
Parish Church of All Saints	Poyntington	Parish church	14th century	31 July 1961	ST6501919972; 50°58′41″N 2°29′59″W	1119366	Parish Church of All Saints More images
Church of Saint Mary	Puddletown	Parish church	16th century	26 January 1956	SY7587294352; 50°44′54″N 2°20′36″W	1154532	Church of Saint Mary More images
Waterston Manor	Lower Waterston, Puddletown	Country house	Early 17th century, rebuilt 1863	26 January 1956	SY7352995207; 50°45′21″N 2°22′36″W	1119080	Waterston Manor More images
Parish Church of St Mary	Puncknowle	Parish church	12th century	5 September 1960	SY5350188646; 50°41′44″N 2°39′35″W	1288107	Parish Church of St Mary More images
Parish Church of St Peter	Purse Caundle	Parish church	15th century	31 July 1961	ST6960017590; 50°57′25″N 2°26′03″W	1119331	Parish Church of St Peter More images
The Manor House and attached walls north and south	Purse Caundle	Manor house	15th century	11 July 1951	ST6951817649; 50°57′27″N 2°26′07″W	1119330	The Manor House and attached walls north and south More images
Parish Church of St Michael and All Angels	Rampisham	Parish church	15th century	11 November 1960	ST5616802206; 50°49′04″N 2°37′25″W	1323863	Parish Church of St Michael and All Angels More images
Pugin Hall	Rampisham	Rectory	1846–47	19 November 1985	ST5587902626; 50°49′17″N 2°37′40″W	1323865	Pugin Hall More images
Parish Church of St Nicholas	Sandford Orcas	Parish church	14th century	31 July 1961	ST6223821049; 50°59′15″N 2°32′22″W	1119333	Parish Church of St Nicholas More images
The Manor House	Sandford Orcas	Manor house	c.1550	11 July 1951	ST6228021025; 50°59′15″N 2°32′20″W	1154226	The Manor House More images
Abbey Church of St Mary	Sherborne	Abbey	Early 12th century	28 November 1950	ST6379216489; 50°56′48″N 2°31′00″W	1110824	Abbey Church of St Mary More images
Abbey Grange	Sherborne	Barn	15th century	28 November 1950	ST6373216695; 50°56′55″N 2°31′04″W	1304799	Upload Photo
Chapel at Sherborne School	Sherborne	Chapel	15th century	28 November 1950	ST6374816519; 50°56′49″N 2°31′03″W	1324313	Chapel at Sherborne School
Hospital of Saints John the Baptist and John the Evangelist	Sherborne	Hospital	1448	28 November 1950	ST6376916404; 50°56′45″N 2°31′02″W	1110827	Hospital of Saints John the Baptist and John the Evangelist More images
Library at Sherborne School	Sherborne	Abbey guest hall	Probably 13th century	28 November 1950	ST6376216508; 50°56′49″N 2°31′02″W	1110832	Library at Sherborne School More images
Sherborne House (Lord Digby's School for Girls)	Sherborne	House	c.1720	28 November 1950	ST6390916922; 50°57′02″N 2°30′55″W	1110694	Sherborne House (Lord Digby's School for Girls) More images
Part of Sherborne School on exterior of north transept of Abbey Church	Sherborne	Abbey building	13th century	28 November 1950	ST6376516497; 50°56′48″N 2°31′02″W	1172618	Part of Sherborne School on exterior of north transept of Abbey Church
School House Dining Hall at Sherborne School	Sherborne	School	1606 or 1608	28 November 1950	ST6384516513; 50°56′49″N 2°30′58″W	1324335	Upload Photo
School House Studies at Sherborne School	Sherborne	Abbey building	15th century	28 November 1950	ST6376916531; 50°56′49″N 2°31′02″W	1110788	Upload Photo
Sherborne Shell House in walled garden of Harper House	Sherborne	Shell house	c.1750	17 June 2008	ST6393616660; 50°56′54″N 2°30′53″W	1392618	Upload Photo
The Cemetery Gate	Sherborne	Abbey gatehouse	15th century	28 November 1950	ST6387016503; 50°56′49″N 2°30′56″W	1324354	The Cemetery Gate More images
The Conduit (The Parade)	Sherborne	Abbey conduit house	Early 16th century	28 November 1950	ST6388616514; 50°56′49″N 2°30′56″W	1110747	The Conduit (The Parade) More images
Church of St Mary	South Perrott	Parish church	13th century	22 December 1983	ST4720506664; 50°51′25″N 2°45′05″W	1211922	Church of St Mary More images
Church of Saint Michael	Stinsford	Parish church	13th-century origin	10 March 1987	SY7113390993; 50°43′04″N 2°24′37″W	1119091	Church of Saint Michael More images
Kingston Maurward House (Dorset College of Agriculture)	Kingston Maurward, Stinsford	Country house	c.1717	26 January 1956	SY7154491039; 50°43′06″N 2°24′16″W	1154732	Kingston Maurward House (Dorset College of Agriculture) More images
The Old Manor House	Kingston Maurward, Stinsford	Manor house	Late 16th century	26 January 1956	SY7184590984; 50°43′04″N 2°24′01″W	1119861	The Old Manor House More images
Parish Church of St Edwold	Stockwood	Parish church	15th century	31 July 1961	ST5901706922; 50°51′37″N 2°35′01″W	1155008	Parish Church of St Edwold More images
Parish Church of St Mary	Stoke Abbott	Parish church	13th century	11 November 1966	ST4536400593; 50°48′08″N 2°46′36″W	1287199	Parish Church of St Mary More images
Church of St Mary	Stratton	Parish church	12th century	26 January 1956	SY6511193776; 50°44′33″N 2°29′45″W	1216517	Church of St Mary More images
Parish Church of Holy Trinity	Swyre	Parish church	15th century	5 September 1960	SY5280888238; 50°41′31″N 2°40′10″W	1279224	Parish Church of Holy Trinity More images
Parish Church of St Nicholas	Sydling St Nicholas	Parish church	c.1500	26 January 1956	SY6301299280; 50°47′31″N 2°31′34″W	1156621	Parish Church of St Nicholas More images
Symondsbury Parish Church (St John the Baptist)	Symondsbury	Parish church	14th century	5 September 1960	SY4450093629; 50°44′23″N 2°47′16″W	1216336	Symondsbury Parish Church (St John the Baptist) More images
Forde Abbey	Thorncombe	Abbey	12th century	4 December 1951	ST3592405177; 50°50′33″N 2°54′41″W	1153362	Forde Abbey More images
Holditch Court, tower 50 metres south of Holditch Court Farmhouse	Thorncombe	Tower of fortified manor house	15th century	4 December 1951	ST3448902152; 50°48′55″N 2°55′53″W	1118927	Holditch Court, tower 50 metres south of Holditch Court Farmhouse More images
Church of Saint John	Tolpuddle	Parish church	14th century	26 January 1956	SY7907394500; 50°44′59″N 2°17′53″W	1119870	Church of Saint John More images
Martyrs' Cottage	Tolpuddle	Detached house	Probably 18th century	26 January 1956	SY7949394415; 50°44′56″N 2°17′31″W	1119869	Martyrs' Cottage More images
Church Farmhouse	Trent	Hall-house	15th century	11 July 1951	ST5890118505; 50°57′52″N 2°35′12″W	1119345	Upload Photo
Parish Church of St Andrew	Trent	Parish church	Early 14th century	31 July 1961	ST5895018536; 50°57′53″N 2°35′09″W	1323927	Parish Church of St Andrew More images
The Chantry and attached walls	Trent	Chantry-house	Mid-15th century	11 July 1951	ST5899418538; 50°57′53″N 2°35′07″W	1303876	The Chantry and attached walls More images
Dairy Cottage	Up Cerne	House	Probably early 19th century	26 January 1956	ST6579102852; 50°49′27″N 2°29′13″W	1153511	Dairy Cottage More images
Warmwell House	Warmwell	Manor house	Early 17th century, probably after 1618	26 January 1956	SY7537585921; 50°40′21″N 2°20′59″W	1119205	Warmwell House More images
Parish Church of St Andrew	West Chelborough	Parish church	15th century	11 November 1966	ST5416605447; 50°50′48″N 2°39′09″W	1303553	Parish Church of St Andrew More images
Parish Church of St Peter	West Knighton	Parish church	12th century	27 October 1986	SY7324287623; 50°41′15″N 2°22′49″W	1323955	Parish Church of St Peter More images
Church of Saint Andrew	West Stafford	Parish church	16th century	26 January 1956	SY7255189626; 50°42′20″N 2°23′24″W	1119840	Church of Saint Andrew More images
Manor House	West Stafford	Manor house	Early 18th century	26 January 1956	SY7284189688; 50°42′22″N 2°23′10″W	1119843	Upload Photo
Stafford House, including attached garden walls on north and east	West Stafford	Country house	1633	26 January 1956	SY7243790017; 50°42′33″N 2°23′30″W	1303432	Stafford House, including attached garden walls on north and east More images
Whitchurch Canonicorum Church (St Candida and Holy Cross)	Whitchurch Canonicorum	Minster	12th century	5 September 1960	SY3967895432; 50°45′19″N 2°51′23″W	1227942	Whitchurch Canonicorum Church (St Candida and Holy Cross) More images
Parish Church (dedication unknown)	Whitcombe	Parish church	12th century	26 January 1956	SY7165488308; 50°41′37″N 2°24′10″W	1119215	Parish Church (dedication unknown) More images
Came House	Winterborne Came	Country house	1754–62	26 January 1956	SY7045988246; 50°41′35″N 2°25′11″W	1119219	Came House More images
Parish Church of St Peter	Winterborne Came	Parish church	14th century	26 January 1956	SY7047388399; 50°41′40″N 2°25′10″W	1323962	Parish Church of St Peter More images
Parish Church of St Martin	Winterborne St Martin	Parish church	15th century	26 January 1956	SY6475489008; 50°41′59″N 2°30′02″W	1119183	Parish Church of St Martin More images
Church of St Mary	Winterbourne Abbas	Parish church	13th century	26 January 1956	SY6187390482; 50°42′46″N 2°32′29″W	1229078	Church of St Mary More images
Church of St Michael	Winterbourne Steepleton	Parish church	12th century	26 January 1956	SY6291289804; 50°42′24″N 2°31′36″W	1229137	Church of St Michael More images
Woodsford Castle	Woodsford	Fortified manor house	14th century	26 January 1956	SY7581690383; 50°42′45″N 2°20′38″W	1155314	Woodsford Castle More images
Parish Church of St Andrew	Yetminster	Parish church	15th century	31 July 1961	ST5944110645; 50°53′38″N 2°34′41″W	1154308	Parish Church of St Andrew More images

=== Southern coastal area of Weymouth and Portland ===
Name	Location	Type	Completed	Date designated	Grid ref. Geo-coordinates	Entry number	Image
Church of St George, Reforne	Easton, Portland	Parish church	1766	16 January 1951	SY6865372012; 50°32′49″N 2°26′38″W	1203132	Church of St George, Reforne More images
Portland Castle	Castletown, Portland	Device Fort	c.1540	17 May 1993	SY6845974370; 50°34′06″N 2°26′48″W	1205262	Portland Castle More images
Rufus Castle with bridge	Easton, Portland	Castle	Probably late 15th century	16 January 1951	SY6975771175; 50°32′22″N 2°25′41″W	1280727	Rufus Castle with bridge More images
Church of All Saints	Wyke Regis, Weymouth	Parish church	1455	12 December 1953	SY6621277786; 50°35′56″N 2°28′44″W	1096743	Church of All Saints More images
Church of St Mary	Weymouth	Parish church	1817, restored 1922	12 December 1953	SY6796478823; 50°36′30″N 2°27′15″W	1147947	Church of St Mary More images
King's Statue	Weymouth	Statue	1809–10	12 December 1953	SY6801979302; 50°36′45″N 2°27′12″W	1365879	King's Statue More images

== See also ==
- Grade II listed buildings in Dorset
- Grade II* listed buildings in Dorset
