= List of cottages in Dorset =

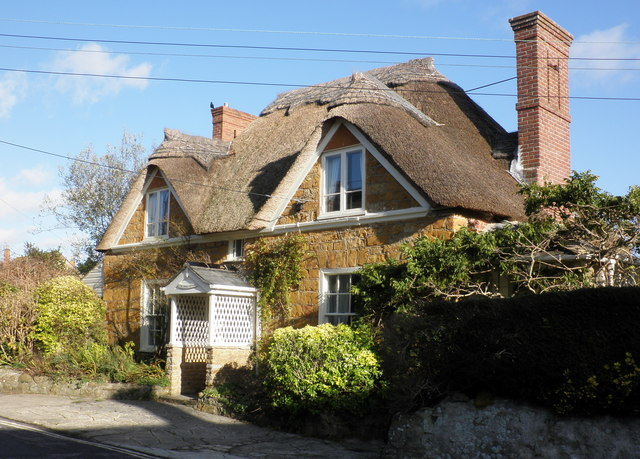
Swiss Cottage in Duck Lane in Chideock

This is a select list of cottages in Dorset.

- Anvil Cottage and Cob Cottage, Chideock
- Butts Cottage, Piddletrenthide
- Clouds Hill
- Dale Cottage, Milton Abbas
- Dorset Cottage and Mere wood Cottage, Tarrant Rushton
- Cross Cottage, Glynn Cottage and Wistaria Cottage, Bradford Abbas
- Iles Cottages, Leigh
- Leeson Cottage, Swanage
- Martyrs' Cottages
- May Cottage, Okeford Fitzpaine
- Nicky House Cottage, Witchampton and another
- Old Came Rectory
- Pope's Cottage, Corscombe
- River Cottage
- Rolls Cottage, Iwerne Minster
- Thomas Hardy's Cottage
- Turnpike Cottage, Wimborne Minster
- Wessex Cottage, Osmington
- Woolgarston Cottage, Corfe Castle
