= Blandford Forum Town Hall =

Municipal building in Blandford Forum, Dorset, England

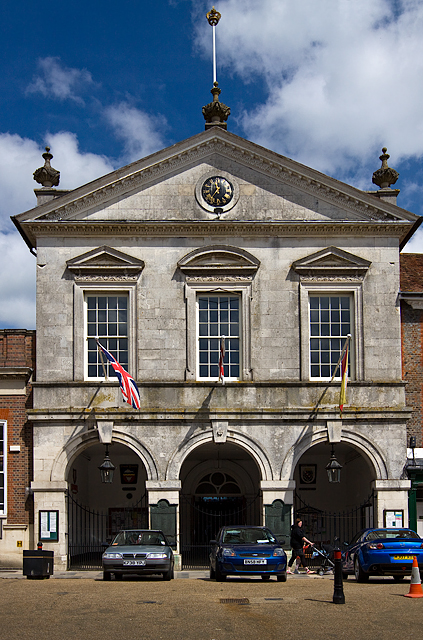
- Blandford Forum Town Hall

- Shown in Dorset
- 50.8562°N 2.1648°W
- Location: Market Place, Blandford Forum

History
- Built: 1734

Site notes
- Architect: John and William Bastard
- Architectural style: Neoclassical style

Listed Building – Grade I
- Official name: Town Hall and Corn Exchange
- Designated: 27 October 1950
- Reference no.: 1324806

Blandford Forum Town Hall is a municipal building in the Market Place in Blandford Forum, Dorset, England. The 18th-century structure, which was the meeting place of Blandford Forum Borough Council, is a Grade I listed building.

== History ==
The first town hall in Blandford Forum was a medieval structure in the middle of the Market Place; after it became very dilapidated, it was demolished and replaced by a second town hall which was erected under the direction of a local merchant, John Pitt, at a cost of £197 in 1593. It was a modest rectangular building which incorporated a lock-up for petty criminals.

A major fire destroyed the greater part of Blandford, including the old town hall, on 4 June 1731. The local architects and civic leaders, John and William Bastard, decided to take the opportunity to remodel the Market Place, to replace the town hall and the grammar school and to rebuild the Church of St Peter and St Paul. The site they chose for the new town hall was slightly to the north of the old building. The new building was designed in the neoclassical style, built in Portland stone and was completed in 1734. The design involved a symmetrical main frontage with three bays facing onto the Market Place; the building was arcaded on the ground floor, so that markets could be held, with an assembly room on the first floor. There was a loggia formed by three large archways with archivolts and wrought iron gates on the ground floor, and there were three sash windows with pediments, the central of which was segmental, on the first floor. At roof level there was a modillioned pediment with a clock in the tympanum. Internally, the principal rooms, which were on the first floor, were the courtroom at the front of the building, and the council chamber, situated behind the courtroom on the left hand side.

The town became a municipal borough in 1835 and the building was extended to the rear, to create a long and narrow corn exchange which featured unusual elliptical roof trusses, to a design by James B. Green of Blandford Forum, in 1858. Although, by the mid-20th century, the council officers and their departments were based at offices in The Plocks, the town hall continued to serve as the main civic venue for the borough council for much of the 20th century. However, it ceased to be the local seat of government after the enlarged North Dorset District Council was formed in 1974. Instead, it became the meeting place of Blandford Forum Town Council and additional offices for the town council were erected at the back of the corn exchange in 1990. Although a more comprehensive restoration of the complex was abandoned amidst local opposition, some limited restoration works were carried out on the façade and the roof in summer 2017.

Works of art in the town hall include portraits of John and William Bastard.

== See also ==
- Grade I listed buildings in Dorset
