= Church of St Mary, Almer, Dorset =

Coordinates: 50.7899°N 2.1246°W

St Mary's Church, Almer
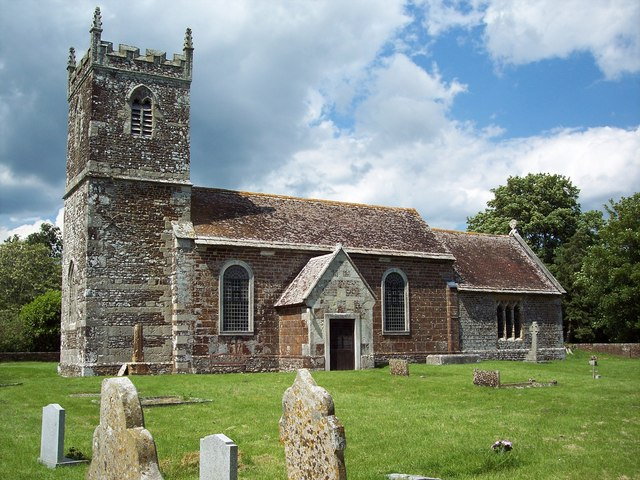
- St Mary's Church, Almer
- Country: England
- Denomination: Church of England

History
- Dedication: St Mary

Architecture
- Heritage designation: Grade I listed
- Designated: 18 March 1955

Administration
- Diocese: Salisbury

Church of Mary is a Grade I listed church in Almer, Dorset, England. It became a listed building on 18 March 1955. According to The King's England: Dorset by Arthur Mee (ISBN 0-340-00079-1), "the embattled tower is 15th Century, and has a fine arch. In a chancel window is much old glass with fragments of drapery, architecture, and fleur-de-lys; the centre panel has bright-hued glass pictures by Continental artists of the days when men and woman wore stiff ruffs about their necks. One window has what appears to be a group of saints, the other has the Last Judgment, with Our Lord enthroned among angels blowing trumpets. A good soul is being rescued by an angel with lilac wings and a blue dress, while a crimson demon with golden horns is seizing a wicked one."

== See also ==
- Grade I listed buildings in Dorset
