= Leweston School =

Location
- Leweston; Sherborne, Dorset, DT9 6EN; England; 50.910015°N 2.520247°W

Information
- Type: Private day and boarding school
- Motto: Gaudere et Bene Facere ('Rejoice and Do Well')
- Religious affiliation: Roman Catholic
- Established: 1891
- Founder: Sisters of Christian Instruction
- Closed: 2026
- Department for Education URN: 113920 Tables
- Head: John Paget-Tomlinson
- Staff: 155
- Gender: Co-educational throughout the whole school
- Age: 3 months to 18
- Houses: Campion; Fisher; Mayne; More
- Colours: Blue and white
- Alumni: Old Antonians
- Website: www.leweston.co.uk

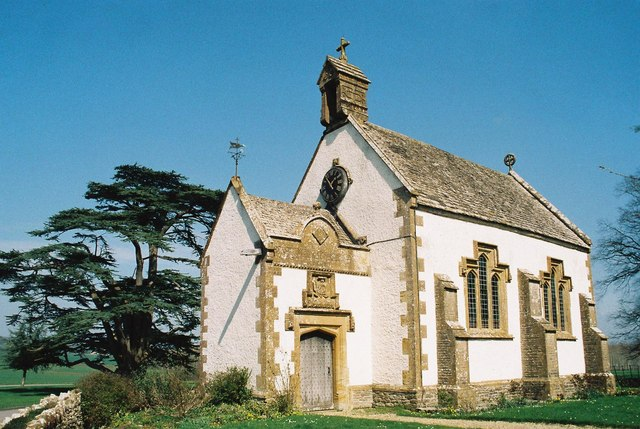
Trinity Chapel

Leweston School was a co-educational independent day and boarding school near Sherborne in Dorset. The School consisted of a Nursery (3 months–4 years), Prep School (4–11 years), Senior School (11–16 years) and Sixth Form (16–18 years). Leweston's values were based upon a supportive Catholic ethos.

Leweston School was operated by a charitable foundation and company, 'Leweston School Trust', which is registered charity no. 295175. The Trust, registered company no. 02041443, was incorporated on 28 July 1986 to provide pre-primary education, primary education and general secondary education. Prior to 27 December 2007, the Trust's legal name was St Antony's Leweston School Trust. The Trust's primary aim is to provide an independent Roman Catholic education. As of 2023, it listed 12 trustees and 180 employees. Ian Lucas was listed as Chairman of the Governors.

Leweston announced its closure with immediate effect on 27 October 2026.

== History ==
Leweston School was founded in Sherborne as St Antony's school in 1891 by the Sisters of Christian Instruction, Sacred Heart nuns from Belgium with Jesuit principles. They operated a school for girl boarders. The senior school moved to the Leweston Manor estate in 1948 and became known as St Antony's-Leweston School; in 1993 the preparatory school followed.

The manor building was Grade II listed in 1951 as "Saint Antony's Convent (formerly listed as Leweston Manor)". At the time, a convent was still there, but the primary use of the building was as the school. The listing states that the interior was "largely remodelled c.1930" and that the additions completed in the mid 20th century were "not of special interest".

The main school building was a Palladian manor house built in the late eighteenth century. The first owner during the 20th century, in 1906, was George Hamilton Fletcher of the White Star shipping line who sold the property to Eric Hamilton Rose in the 1920s. Rose dubbed it Leweston Manor; he and his wife Rosamond arranged for major renovations to be completed. It was sold in 1948 to the nuns of St Antony's School, who sold the freehold in 1990; it has remained a Roman Catholic school, renamed Leweston School in 2007. The current owner has maintained the historic integrity of the manor and chapel.

The school grounds occupied 46 acres (190,000 m^{2}), and include the Chapel of the Holy Trinity, a Grade I listed building, constructed in 1616 by Sir John Fitzjames. The Trinity Chapel is the oldest building on the school site and was used regularly for smaller services.

Most of this chapel's interior is from the 17th century, including the two-decker pulpit, but the original altar is missing; the current altar was added in the 1930s. There is another chapel in the main school. It is modern, completed in 1970, with a triangular plan.

Leweston was bought by a subsidiary of Concept Education in December 2025. On 27 October 2026, Leweston School posted on its website that the school would not reopen after the half-term. A later statement from the CEO described financial difficulties and "issues in the school's operations ... that were far beyond anything we could have anticipated". The school entered a formal insolvency process.

== Notable alumni ==
- Dido Harding, Baroness Harding of Winscombe – businesswoman and Conservative life peer
- Erin Pizzey – Equality activist and founder of world's first domestic violence shelter
- Kristin Scott Thomas – actress
- Serena Scott Thomas – actress
