= St Nicholas' Church, Studland =

Coordinates: 50.642274°N 1.949792°W

Church of St Nicholas, Studland
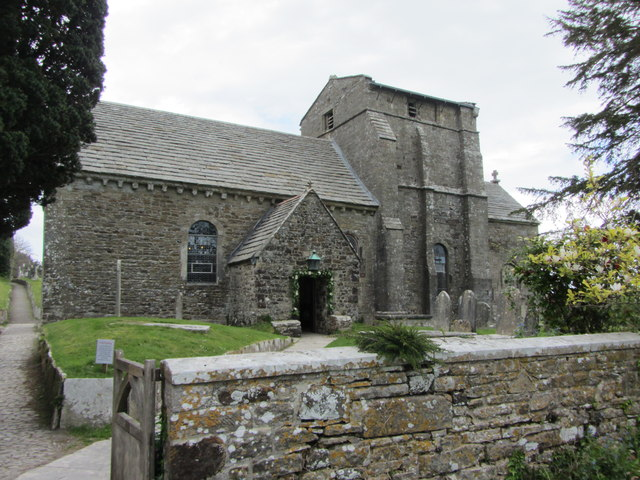
- Church of St Nicholas from the south

- Location in Dorset
- Location: Studland, Dorset, England
- Denomination: Church of England
- Website: https://www.achurchnearyou.com/church/9423/

History
- Dedication: Saint Nicholas

Architecture
- Heritage designation: Grade I
- Designated: 20 November 1959
- Style: Norman architecture
- Years built: 1732–1910

Administration
- Province: Canterbury
- Diocese: Salisbury
- Archdeaconry: Dorset
- Deanery: Purbeck
- Benefice: Swanage and Studland Team Ministry

The Church of Saint Nicholas is a Church of England parish church in Studland, Dorset, England. It was built in the early 12th century on the foundations of an earlier Anglo-Saxon church. It is recorded in the National Heritage List for England as a Grade I listed building, and is a good example of a small, largely unaltered, Norman church.

== History ==
The church is dedicated to Saint Nicholas of Myra, the patron saint of mariners. Little is known of the church's early history, but a study for the Dorset Natural History and Archaeological Society in 1999 concluded that most of the present structure had been built after 1125 and completed by 1140. Although there is no mention of a church at Studland in the Domesday Book of 1086, this is not unusual. The manor at the time of the survey was held by Robert, Count of Mortain (c. 1031–c. 1095), half-brother of William the Conqueror, who held more land than any other Norman baron. The landholding of Studland at the time when the church was probably built is uncertain, but a number of similarities have been identified between Studland church and Romsey Abbey, suggesting that the same master mason was employed at both.

Some rebuilding work was undertaken in the 18th century. By 1880, large cracks had appeared in the walls and the church seemed to be in danger of collapsing; the walls were shored up with large timber baulks while the walls were being underpinned with concrete. The roof of the nave was reconstructed in 1930–31 and the tower roof in 1933.

Architectural historian Nikolaus Pevsner described the church as "one of the most complete Norman village churches in England".

== Description ==
The Church of St Nicholas has a three cell plan, consisting of a nave, chancel and sanctuary with a squat central tower. A south porch was added in the 17th-century. The chancel and sanctuary have quadripartite vaulted rooves. Most of the windows are simple lancet arches dating from the 12th-century. A plain stone font is also from the 12th-century. The wooden pulpit, pews and west gallery are 19th-century.

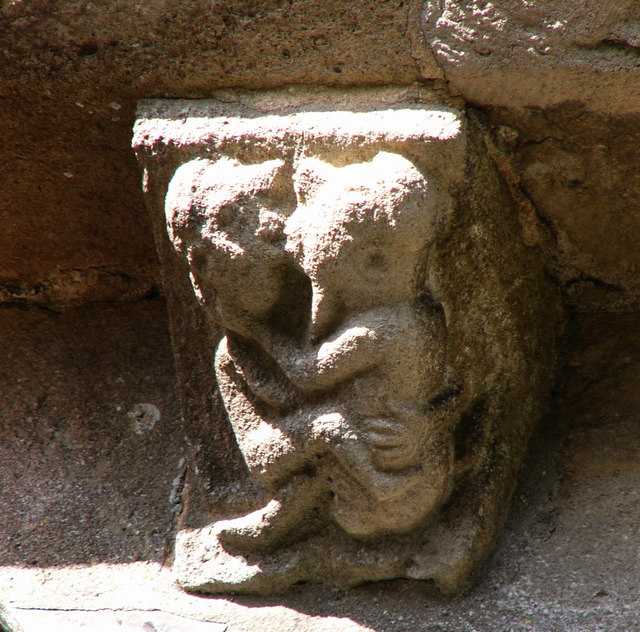
A carved corbel on the south wall depicting an embracing couple.

=== Corbels ===
On the exterior north and south walls of the nave, the roof rests on tables of carved 12th-century corbels of various designs including floral and grotesque animal heads. Other carvings depict sexual imagery; a copulating couple, a phallic man and a sheela na gig, some of which have been defaced by iconoclasts; they are believed to have been intended as a warning against immoral behaviour.
