= St Mary's Church, Charminster =

Church in Dorset, England

Church of St Mary, Charminster
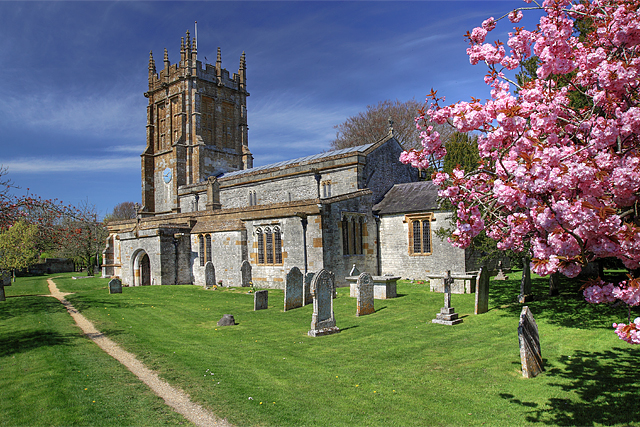
- Viewed from the south-east
- Church of St Mary, Charminster
- 50°43′58.8″N 2°27′21.2″W
- OS grid reference: SY 679 927
- Location: Charminster
- Country: England
- Denomination: Church of England
- Website: www.stmarys-charminster.org.uk

History
- Dedication: Mary the Virgin

Architecture
- Heritage designation: Grade I
- Designated: 26 january 1956

Administration
- Diocese: Diocese of Salisbury

St Mary's Church is an Anglican church in the village of Charminster, Dorset, in the Diocese of Salisbury. It is a Grade I listed building. The oldest parts date from the 11th and 12th centuries, and the tower was built in the 16th century.

== Description ==
=== Early history ===
There was a minster church, perhaps a wooden building, here in the 8th century. There is some evidence that the site of the present church was at that time the river bed, and that the Saxon church was situated nearer North Street to the west.

The oldest parts of the present building, parts of the east wall of the nave, date from the 11th century. The north and south arcades and part of the south aisle, and the chancel arch, are of the late 12th century.

=== Trenchard family ===
The south aisle was extended in the 15th century, by the Trenchard family of Wolfeton House, to form the south chapel, and further extended in the early 16th century. There are table tombs of members of the Trenchard family in the south chapel.

The tower was built in the 16th century by Thomas Trenchard. It has three stages and an embattled parapet with seven gargoyles. The north and south vestries, adjacent to the tower, are also of this period. Thomas Trenchard's spiral monogram is carved on the tower in many places, and on the vestries. The south porch is 16th-century, its arch being reconstructed in the 17th century.

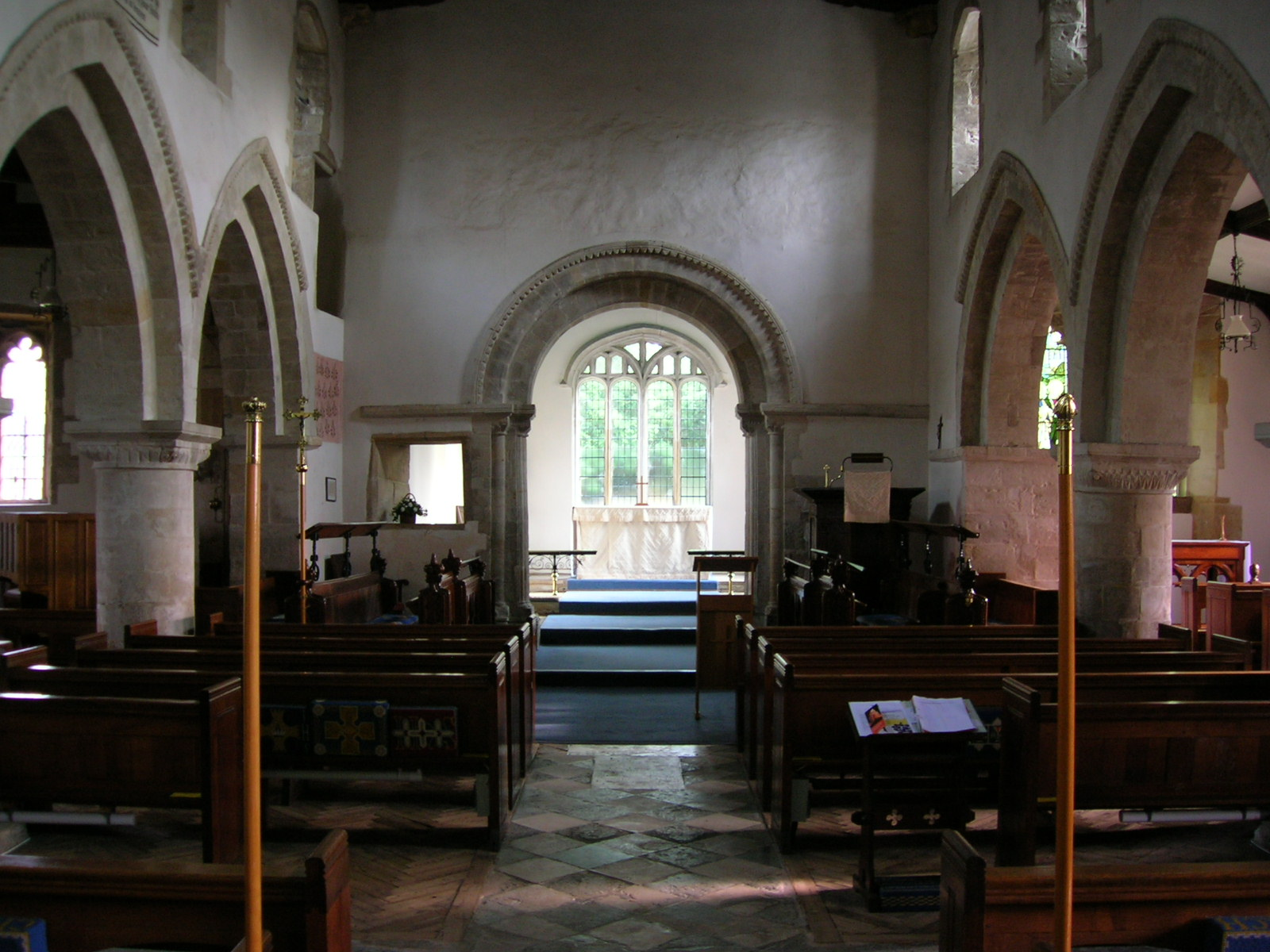
Looking east towards the 12th-century chancel arch

On the north wall of the nave there are areas of stencilled decoration, from the early 16th century, showing strawberries and strawberry leaves.

The font, probably 12th-century, was recut and reshaped in the 15th century.

=== Later modifications ===
The chancel, demolished in the 17th century, was rebuilt about 1838, and the north aisle was rebuilt in the late 19th century. The roofs were replaced in 1895. A new organ was installed about 1953.
