= St Peter's Church, Portesham =

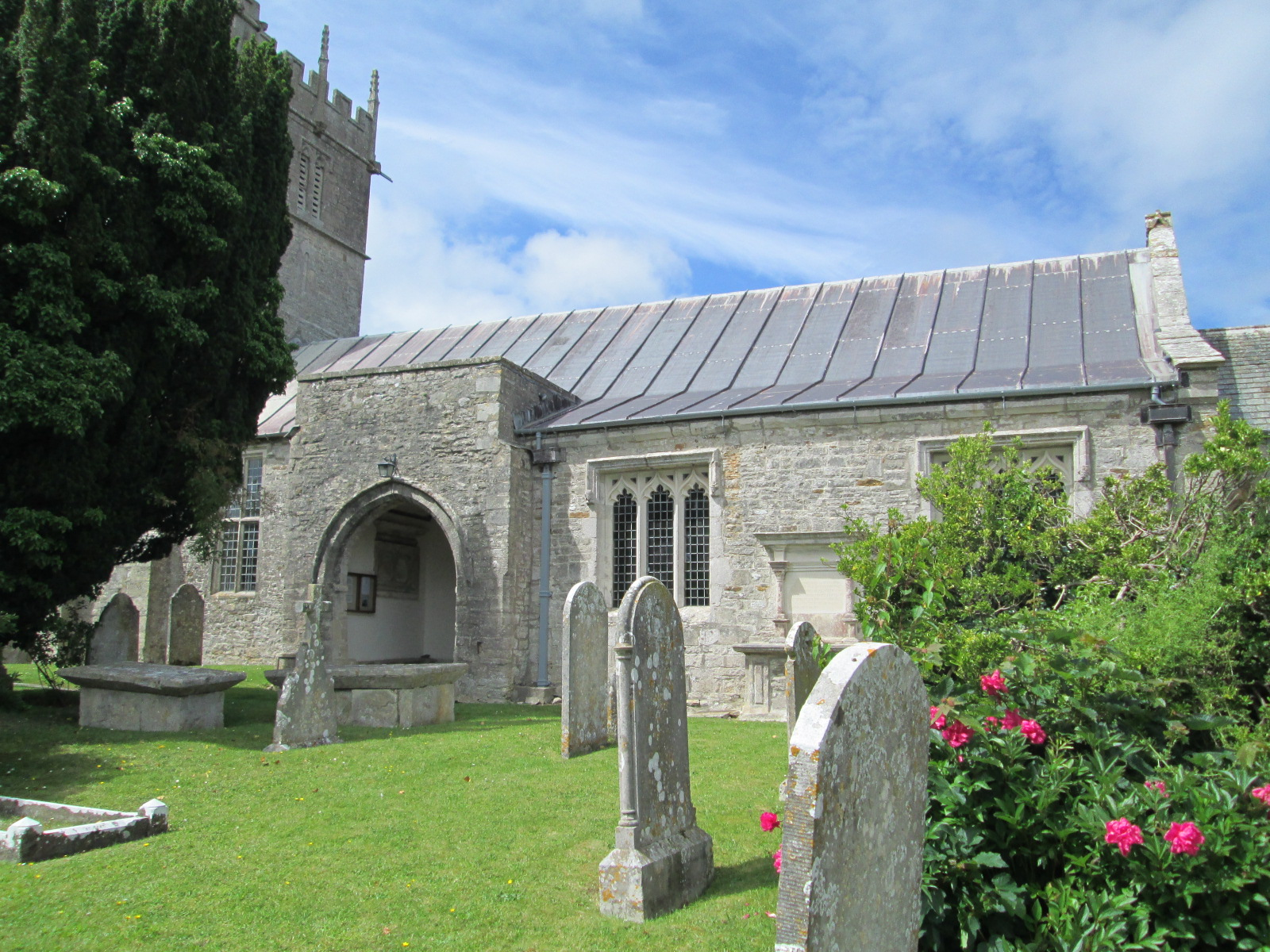
- Viewed from the south
- St Peter's Church, Portesham
- 50°40′15″N 2°33′49″W
- OS grid reference: SY 602 858
- Location: Portesham
- Country: England
- Denomination: Church of England

Architecture
- Heritage designation: Grade I
- Designated: 26 January 1956

Administration
- Diocese: Diocese of Salisbury

St Peter's Church is an Anglican church, the parish church in the village of Portesham, Dorset. It is a Grade I listed building. The earliest parts date from the 12th century, and it has suffered comparatively little from restoration.

== Description ==
=== History ===
The church is thought to be built with stone from a local quarry. The earliest parts date from the 12th century; the church of that time probably had a shorter nave, with north and south aisles, and a shorter chancel. Part of the original north arcade (once leading into a north aisle) survives in the north wall. The present chancel dates from the 13th century, when the nave was lengthened and the tower was built.

About 1500 the chancel arch was rebuilt, and the present narrow north and south aisles were built, with two-bay arcades in the eastern part of the nave leading to the aisles. The top stage was added to the tower at this time. The south porch was built later that century.

The font, near the door, dates probably from the 13th century. There are two bells in the tower, made in 1607 and 1623.

=== Chancel ===
The nave is not quite in line with the chancel, which veers slightly to the south, but the outer walls of the aisles are aligned with the chancel.

The rood screen dates from the early 16th century. The chancel arch has squints on each side. The side windows of the chancel date from the early 14th century; the stonework of the east window is of the same date as the chancel arch, about 1500.

=== Interior details ===
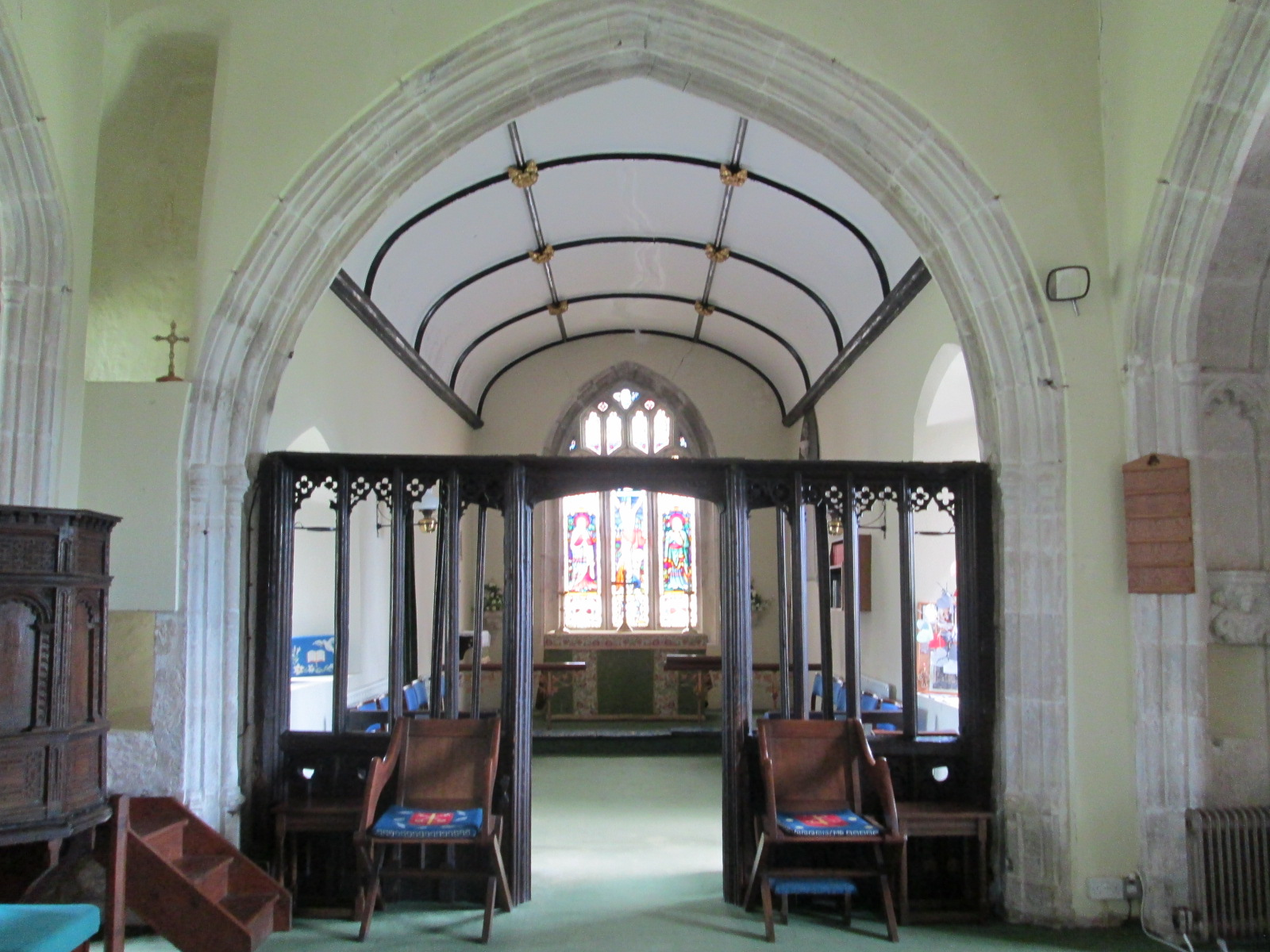
The chancel arch and rood screen, looking towards the chancel

The north aisle was formerly known as the Waddon Aisle, as the people of Waddon, a hamlet east of Portesham, used to worship here.

There was formerly a gallery at the west end of the nave, where musicians played; a corbel supporting it can be seen. The gallery was removed in 1872, and a reed organ was installed. This was replaced by an organ in 1895. The present organ, by Hill, Norman & Beard, was installed in the south aisle in 1968.

== Living Churchyards project ==
St Peter's is part of the Living Churchyards project of the Dorset Wildlife Trust, in which volunteers from the Trust visit churches in Dorset to advise on managing churchyards with regards to wildlife. The grass remains uncut at times, to allow wild flowers to flourish: more than 70 species have been identified. In 2011 the church won Best New Entry in the Living Churchyards competition, and was runner-up in this category in 2012. In 2013 it won the Bishop's Prize.
