= Holy Trinity Church, Godmanstone =

Church in Dorset, England

Holy Trinity Church
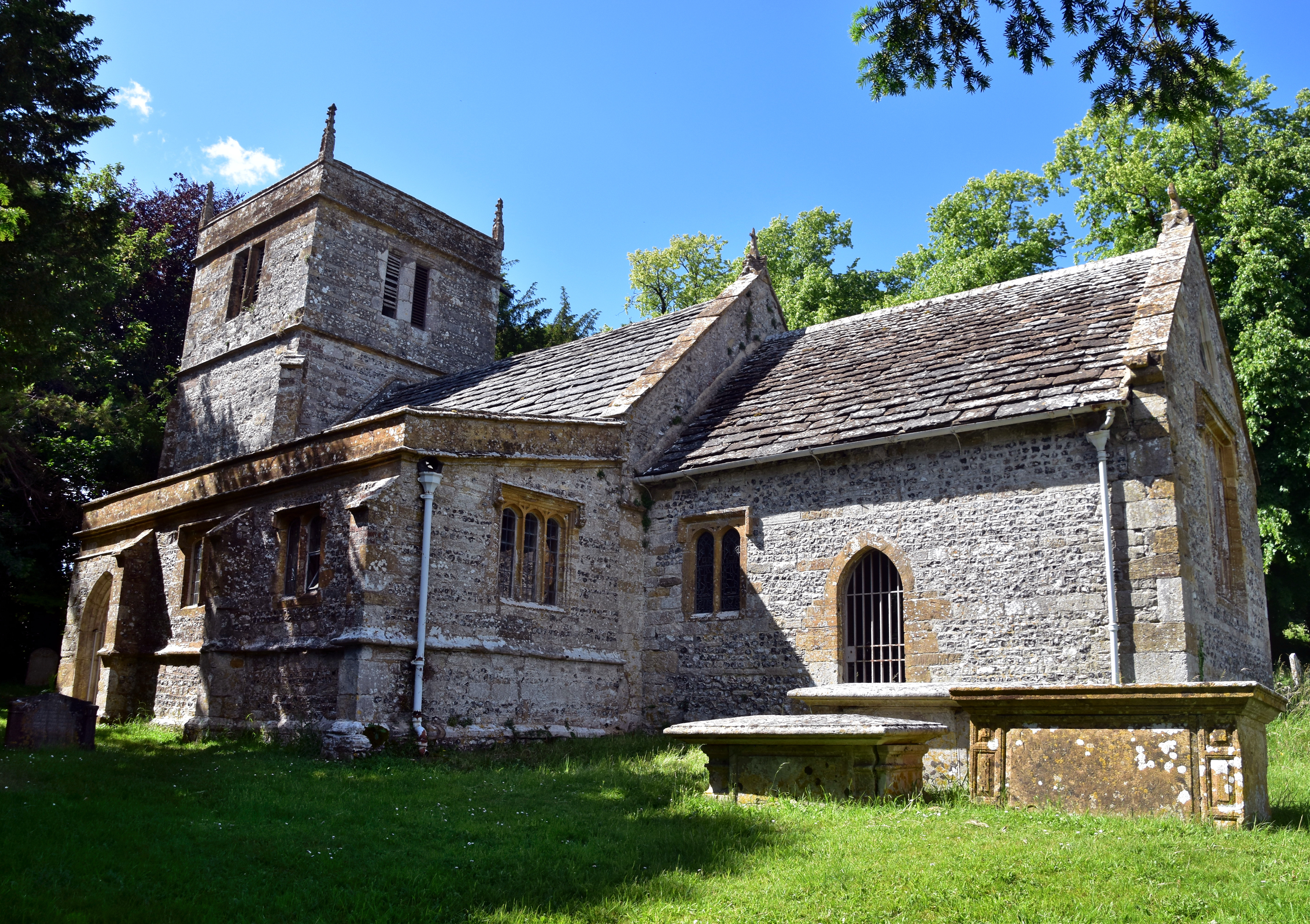

Religion
- Affiliation: Church of England
- Ecclesiastical or organizational status: Active
- Religious features: Four bells

Location
- Location: Godmanstone, Dorset, England
- Country: United Kingdom
- Interactive map of Holy Trinity Church
- Coordinates: 50.7749°N 2.4751°W

Architecture
- Type: Church
- Completed: 12th century
- Materials: Local flint and rubble stone, with freestone dressings and roofs of stone slates and slates

Listed Building – Grade I
- Official name: Church of Holy Trinity, Godmanstone
- Designated: 26 January 1956
- Reference no.: 1215038

Holy Trinity Church is a Church of England parish church at Godmanstone, Dorset, England. The church has 12th century origins and is a Grade I listed building.

== History ==
The existing church has 12th century origins, but there is evidence that an earlier church, possibly a wooden construction, was on the same site beforehand. The earliest parts of the church are the chancel arch and south doorway, which date to the 12th century but have since been restored and altered. The nave was rebuilt and the west tower added in the 15th century. The north and south chapels, along with the south porch, date to the 16th century and the chancel was also rebuilt during this century. The top stage of the tower was rebuilt in the 17th century. A restoration was carried out in 1848, when the chancel was largely rebuilt; the north chapel was also rebuilt during the 19th century. Another restoration was carried out in 1864, which involved reflooring and reseating the church.

In 1932, central heating was installed in the church. In 1948, electric lighting was installed, along with a plaque in memory of the two men of the parish who died in World War II. The chancel and sanctuary were rearranged in 1963 and a gas heating system was installed in 1964.

== Architecture ==
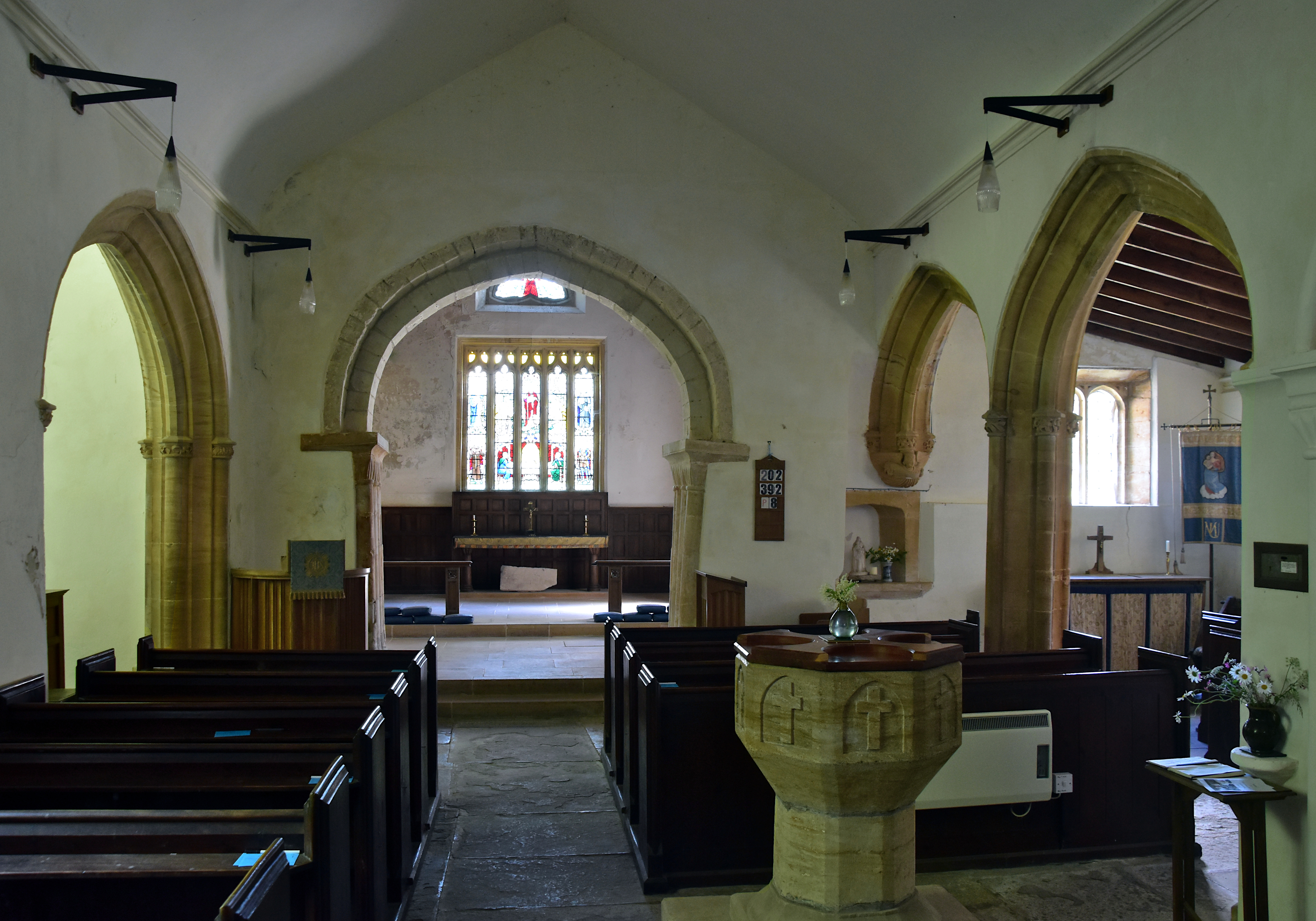
The interior of Holy Trinity Church.

Holy Trinity Church is built of local flint and rubble stone, with freestone dressings and roofs of stone slates and slates. It is made up of a nave, north and south chapels, a three-stage west tower, chancel, south porch and vestry. The tower contains four bells: an early 16th century one from Salisbury foundry and inscribed "Sit nomen Domini Benedictum", two by William Warre (dated 1607 and 1610) and one by George Purdue, dated 1617. In 2007, the four bells were removed for restoration and were rededicated by the Bishop of Sherborne, Tim Thornton, on 14 October 2007. Prior to restoration, the bells had not been rung as a set for around 100 years and all were cracked, though one bell could still be rung. The medieval oak frame holding them had also fallen into a "dangerous" condition. The bells have been described as being of "exceptional antiquarian interest" and "possibly the most important early installation to remain in Dorset".

Fittings within the church include an octagonal font of 15th century date with 19th century panelling. The organ of 1933 was built by John Holt of Birmingham and was restored in 2021. A new pulpit was installed in 1966. A new altar, made by "two Franciscan Brothers", was installed in 1942. A prayer desk, vestry screen and credence table were installed in 1967. They were designed by the Weymouth architect Ernest Walmsley Lewis and were paid for using £350 bequeathed to the church by Mrs. Mitchell of Godmanstone.

A memorial stained glass window to Hubert Phillipps Pope, son of a former rector at Godmanstone, was installed in the church's east window in 1931. It represents the Good Shepherd and was dedicated by the Archdeacon of Sherborne, Albert Joscelyne, on 28 October 1931. In 1932, two stained glass windows were installed in the chancel.

== Listed monuments ==
In the churchyard of Holy Trinity are the following Grade II listed monuments:

- Thomas Pitman, wife Rebekah and five young children and their son Edward, table tomb, dated 1717 (Grade II* listed)
- M. Stephen, table tomb, dated 1725
- Inscription illegible, table tomb, dated 1742
- Inscription illegible, table tomb, mid-18th century
