= St Mary the Virgin, Lytchett Matravers =

Church in Dorset, England

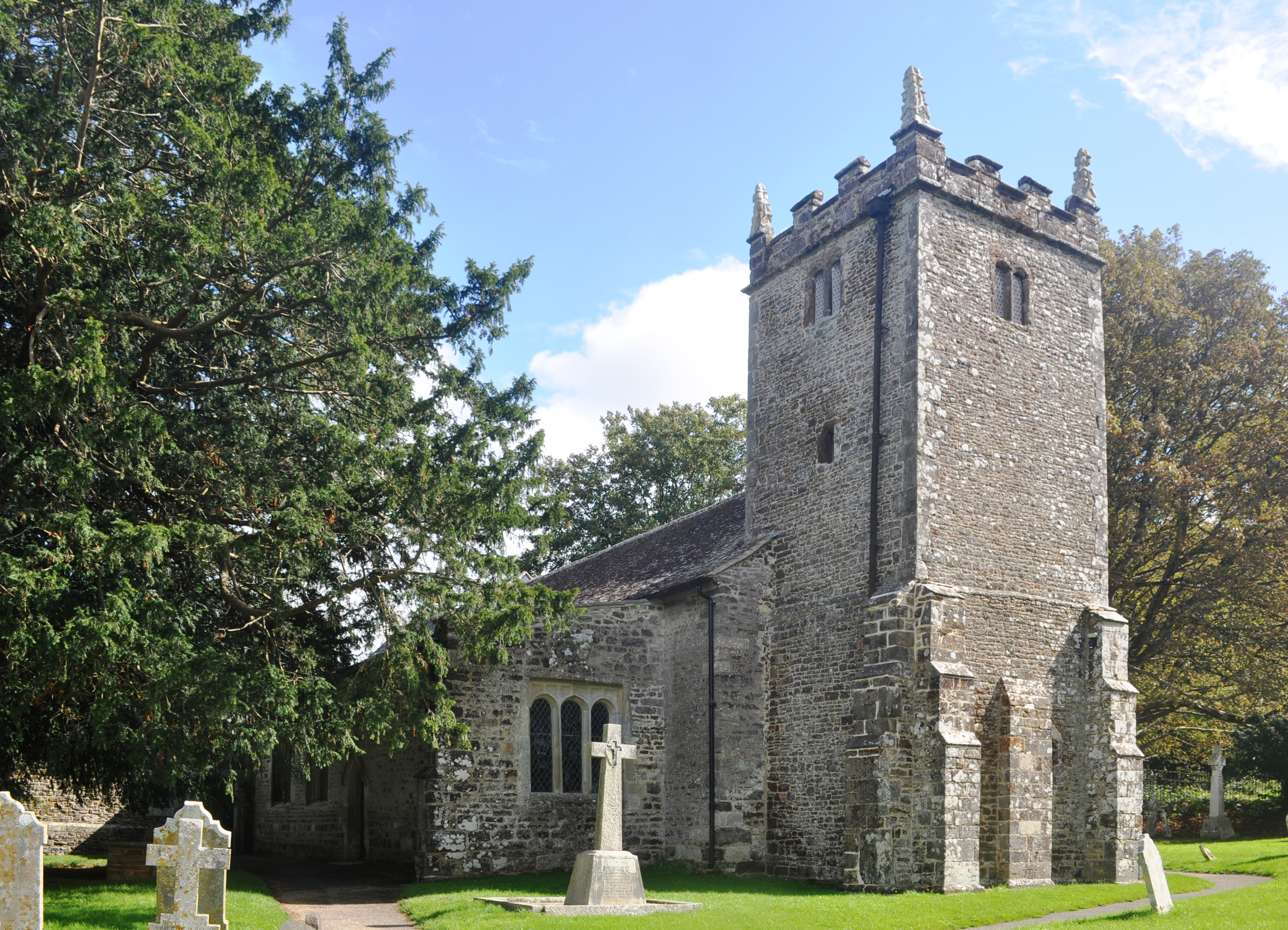
- The church in September 2025
- St Mary the Virgin, Lytchett Matravers
- 50.76507°N 2.09224°W
- OS grid reference: SY 93591 96169
- Location: Lytchett Matravers
- Country: England
- Denomination: Church of England
- Previous denomination: Roman Catholic

History
- Founded: 12th century
- Dedication: St Mary the Virgin

Architecture
- Heritage designation: Grade I listed
- Designated: 20 November 1959
- Years built: 13th–15th centuries

Administration
- Province: Canterbury
- Diocese: Salisbury
- Archdeaconry: Dorset
- Deanery: Poole
- Parish: Lytchett Matravers

St Mary the Virgin is the Church of England parish church of Lytchett Matravers in Dorset. Its parish is part of the Diocese of Salisbury. The building is Grade I listed.

== History ==
=== Foundation ===
There is no known record of the date of the foundation of the church at Lytchett Matravers. The Domesday Book records that by 1086 Sir John Maltravers held the manor of Lytchett Matravers. The John Matravers who was buried in the church was Edward II's gaoler and possibly his murderer.

In the churchyard, just outside the north door, is a yew tree that in the 1980s was dated to be at least 1,700 years old. Its location here next to the church suggests the spot has been a holy place since before the current church was built.

A Sir Walter Maltravers went on a Crusade to the Holy Land and it is possible that he ordered the church to be built beside the manor house in his absence about the year 1200. The west tower, the nave and the chancel were built then, followed by the north aisle in the 14th century. Sir John Maltravers’ heir, his granddaughter Eleanor, carried the manor and title to her husband John FitzAlan, 1st Baron Arundel. Their descendants have been Earls of Arundel since 1415 and later Dukes of Norfolk, but are still Barons Maltravers.

The tower is the oldest part of the building. The arch dates from 1200 but the pinnacles, which are carved within the Maltravers fret, are from about 1500.

The arcade on the north side of the nave was built about 1350, when the north aisle was added. There is also an unusually large hagioscope or squint giving a view from the north aisle to the chancel and altar.

=== Plague ===
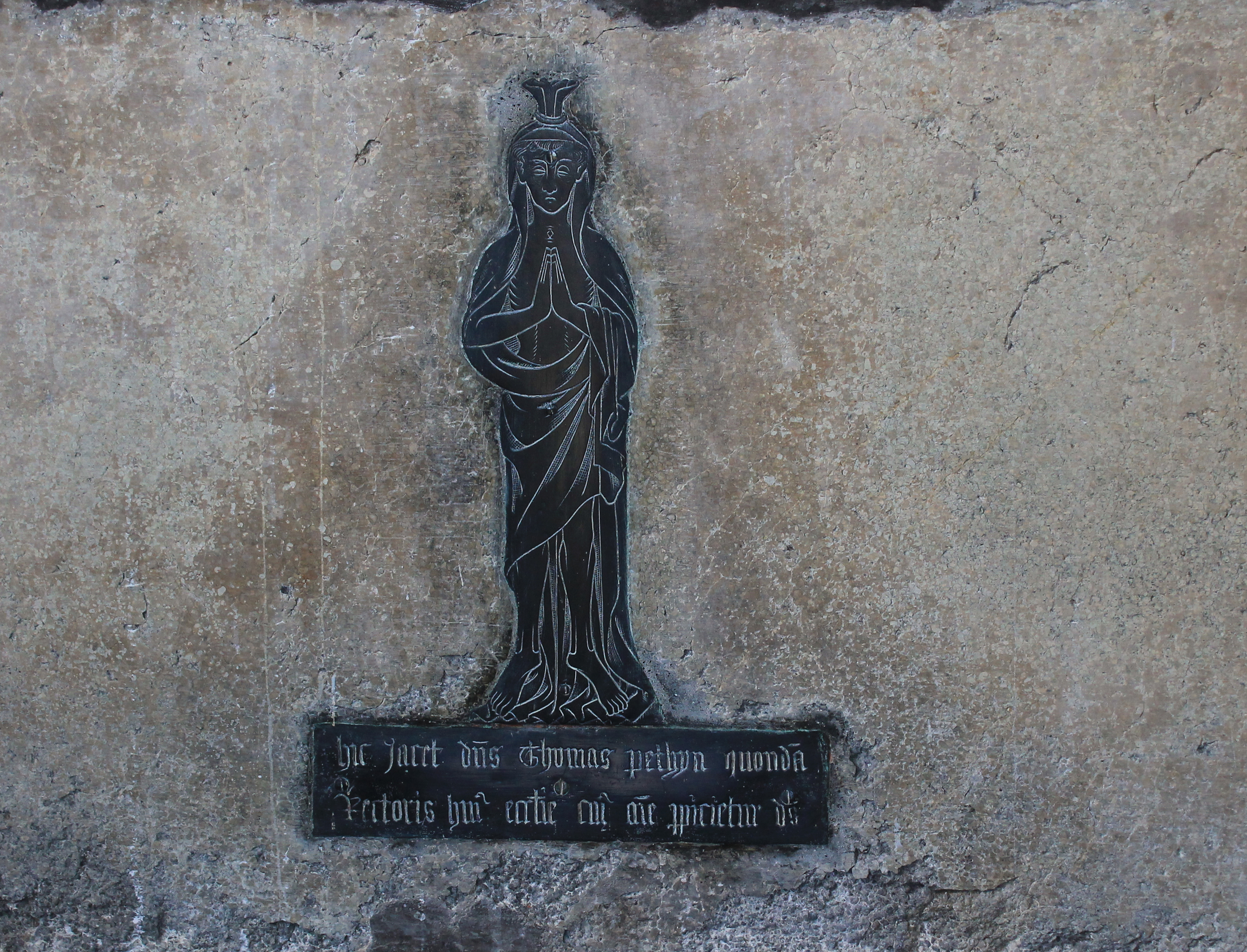
Brass monument installed about 1475 in memory of Rev. Thomas Pethyn or Talpathyn

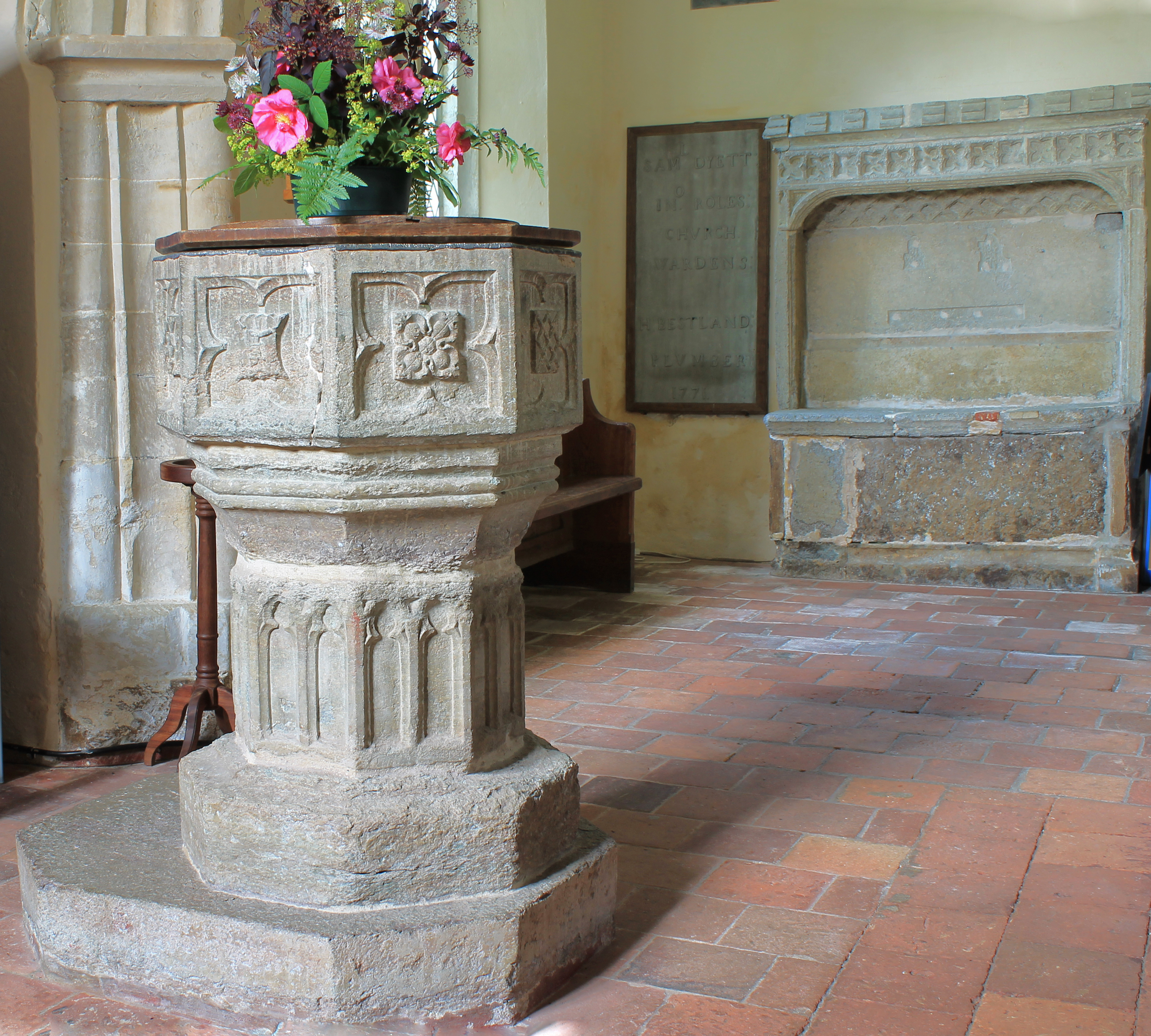
Perpendicular Gothic font, made about 1500

Local tradition has it that the village moved away from the site of the church during the Black Death. The church slowly fell into disuse and was used solely by the Rector for morning prayer and vespers, with regular worship moving to a chapel in the village.

The church has a late-15th-century monumental brass in memory of Thomas Pethyn or Talpathyn, who was rector 1430–70. It is a cadaver monument, showing his corpse in its burial shroud, which is a style unusual for monumental brasses in England. Elsewhere there is an example from the early 16th century, also in memory of a parish priest, in the parish church at Oddington, Oxfordshire.

A great deal of restoration was carried out at the beginning of the 16th century at the behest of Dame Margarita Clements.

In the 17th century the Arundel family, heirs by marriage to the Maltravers estate, funded the restoration of St Mary's and rebuilding of the north aisle. The chapel in the village was closed and parish worship returned to St Mary's.

=== Civil war ===
In the English Civil War, Parliamentarian infantry defaced a tomb in the north aisle, removing and destroying its inscribed plaque. The tomb is believed to be that of a member of the Arundel or Maltravers family.

=== 19th century ===
Pews were added to St Mary's in the 19th century.

In 1891 the barrel organ was replaced by a pipe organ with two manuals and pedals. Over the next century it was rebuilt several times and improved. About this time a vestry extension was built behind the new organ, creating a room accessible from the chancel and hidden from the rest of the church by the organ pipes. This instrument was replaced in 1992 by a Wyvern electronic organ.

=== 20th century ===
The present pulpit was installed in the 1950s.

In the 1960 and 70s an offer to build a secondary church building in the centre of the village during the planning and development of the village hall was declined by the parish leadership of the time.

A new Wyvern electronic organ was installed in 1992 and the vestry area opened up to form an administrative area and vestry. More modern pews were added to the north aisle about this time, originally from Sherborne Abbey. These pews are clearly distinguishable from the Edwardian pews.

The north transept was extended in 1993 to give added facilities including a new vestry and small upper room which was used for Sunday school and some meetings.

In 1962 the footballer Fred Pentland was buried in the churchyard.

=== 21st century ===
By the early 2000s the building had a number of cosmetic problems that needed addressing and some suspected structural problems. In 2011, late-20th-century render on the southern walls was found to have been incorrectly applied and the non-porous wash used was causing problems with the integrity of the nave walls and floor. The joists that support the floor under the chancel step were found to be rotten due to moisture created by the problem with the walls. Emergency repairs were made on the joists and a temporary floor installed to allow use of the building to continue. The pulpit was removed as the floor could no longer support it. In 2012 a group of volunteers redecorated the church in less than two weeks. The non-porous render was removed and an approved lime wash applied to the walls. There was then a wait for the walls to dry completely and the rebuilding of the chancel step to be approved. Other structural and maintenance problems were addressed in the years 2012–13, including re-digging of soak-aways to help the drainage and drying of the church and a significant number of minor and medium-priority issues that were highlighted in the 2010 quinquennial report.

== Bells ==
The tower has a ring of six bells. The third bell is medieval, cast by the Salisbury foundry about AD 1400. John Wallis of Salisbury cast the fifth bell in 1616 and John I Tosier, also of Salisbury, cast the tenor bell in 1684. Mears and Stainblank of the Whitechapel Bell Foundry cast the treble, second and third bells in 1931. Also in 1931 the other bells were cleaned and refurbished and the ring was rededicated.

== Deanery and parish ==
The parish was in Poole Deanery until the mid-1990s, when it was made part of Milton and Blandford Deanery. On 1 January 2010 the parish reverted to Poole Deanery. In October the parish together with the Lytchett Minster and Upton Team Ministry formed the Benefice of the Lytchetts and Upton. This is largely a resource-sharing benefice. St Mary's retains its own vicar but as part of a wider team of clergy.

== Clergy ==
=== Rectors of the Parish 1313–1977 ===
Rectors of St Mary's 1313–1977, as transcribed by local historian Shirley Percivel in 1982:

1313	Jordon Sarol	Will Mautravers
1316	William de Cabrithaley	Thomas de Bocklande
1324	James le Brut	
1326	William de Astyngton	
1332	Hugh Filiol	
1340	Richard de Pourstock	
1342	John de Stoke	
1348	Peter Fitzwaryn	
1361	Henry Tingwyke	Walter Rickener
1362	John de Sonnyings	
1390	Thomas Claydon	Robert Fynor
1392	John White	
1398	Stephen Pope	
1430	Thomas Talpathyn	
1470	John Wheler & John Campion	
1485	Robert Grenelode	
1504	John Hoper	
1518	John Vesey LLD	
1583	James Turbervile & William Lyllington	
1587	William Burges	
1615	Swithin Cleves	
1658	Thomas Rowe	
1662	Samuel Conant DD	
1719	William Leigh DD	
1752	John Trenchard Bromfield LLD	
1753	John Leach BA	
1792	George Trenchard LLD	
1808	John Wickens	
1810	Henry Luke Dillon BA	
1832	Christopher Fleet MA	
1841	Howell James MA	
1850	William Mortimer Heath MA	
1917	James Alexander Renton Swaby	
1939	Arthur Phillips FRCO	
1943	George Heaslett BA	
1950	James Nicholas Mahon MA	

=== Clergy since 1977 ===
Year licensed	Name	Title held
1977	John Hamblen	Priest-in-charge
1984	Nigel Lloyd	Rector
1994	Patrick Hastings	Priest-in-Charge
2010	Parish became part of The Lytchetts & Upton Benefice	
2010	Ali Mepham	Team Vicar
2016	Stephen Partridge	Team Vicar
