= St John's Church, Tolpuddle =

Coordinates: 50.7497°N 2.2980°W

Church of Saint John, Tolpuddle
- Church of Saint John the Evangelist
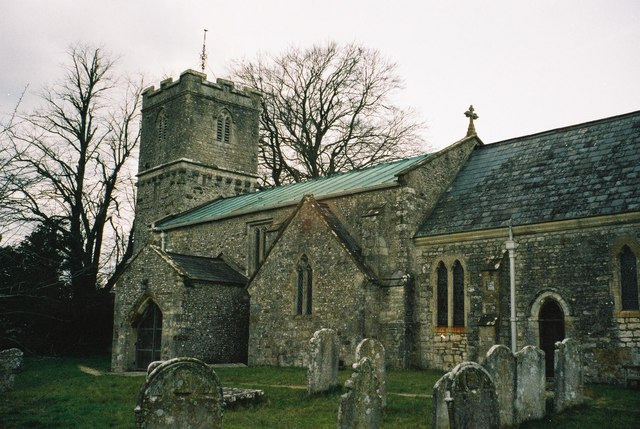
- Church of Saint John, Tolpuddle
- Location: Dorchester Road, Tolpuddle, Dorset, DT2 7EW
- Country: England
- Denomination: Church of England

History
- Status: Active
- Dedication: Saint John the Evangelist

Architecture
- Functional status: Parish church
- Heritage designation: Grade I listed

Administration
- Diocese: Diocese of Salisbury
- Archdeaconry: Archdeaconry of Sherborne
- Parish: Tolpuddle

Clergy
- Rector: The Revd Sarah Hillman

The Church of Saint John the Evangelist is a Church of England parish church in Tolpuddle, Dorset. The church is a Grade I listed building.

== History ==
The earliest parts of the church date to the 12th century, and it was enlarged in the 13th and 14th centuries. It was restored in 1855 by the architect T. H. Wyatt.

On 26 January 1956, the church was designated a Grade I listed building.

== Gallery ==
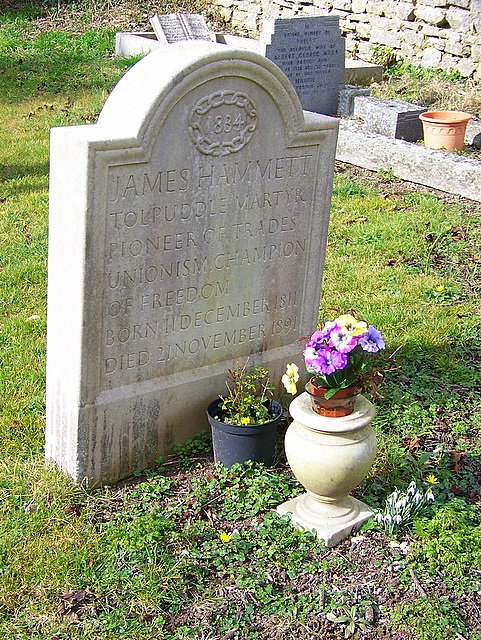
The grave of James Hammett, one of the Tolpuddle Martyrs

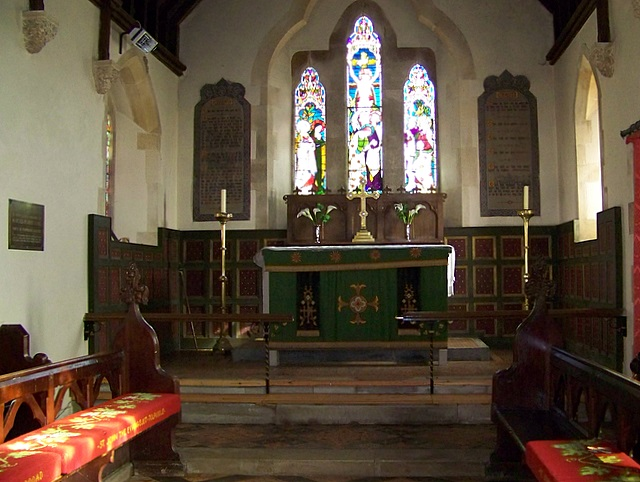
The chancel with high altar

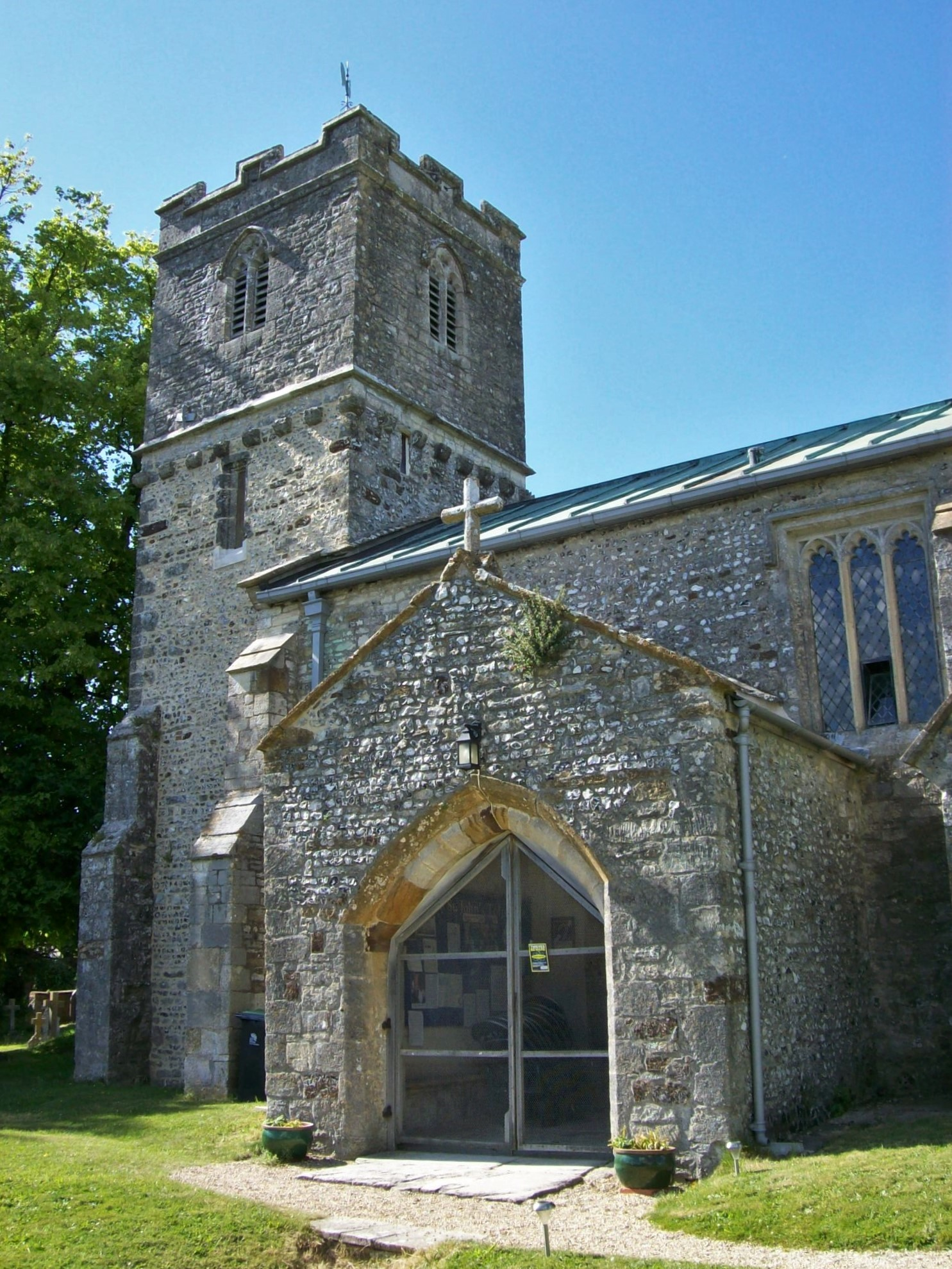
Tower and door

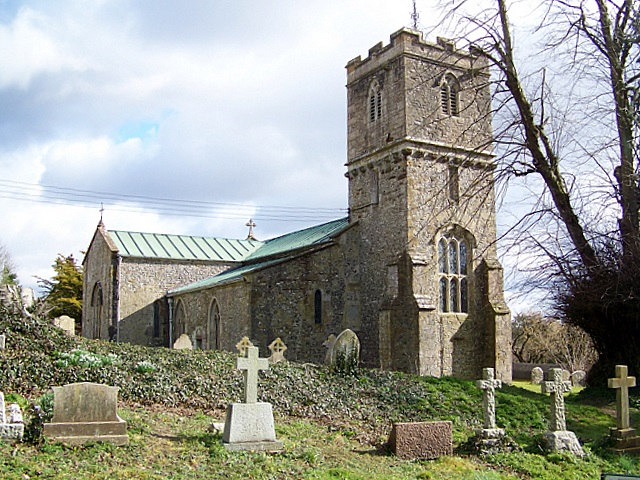
