= Godmanstone =

Village and civil parish in Dorset, England

Coordinates: 50.7736°N 2.4742°W

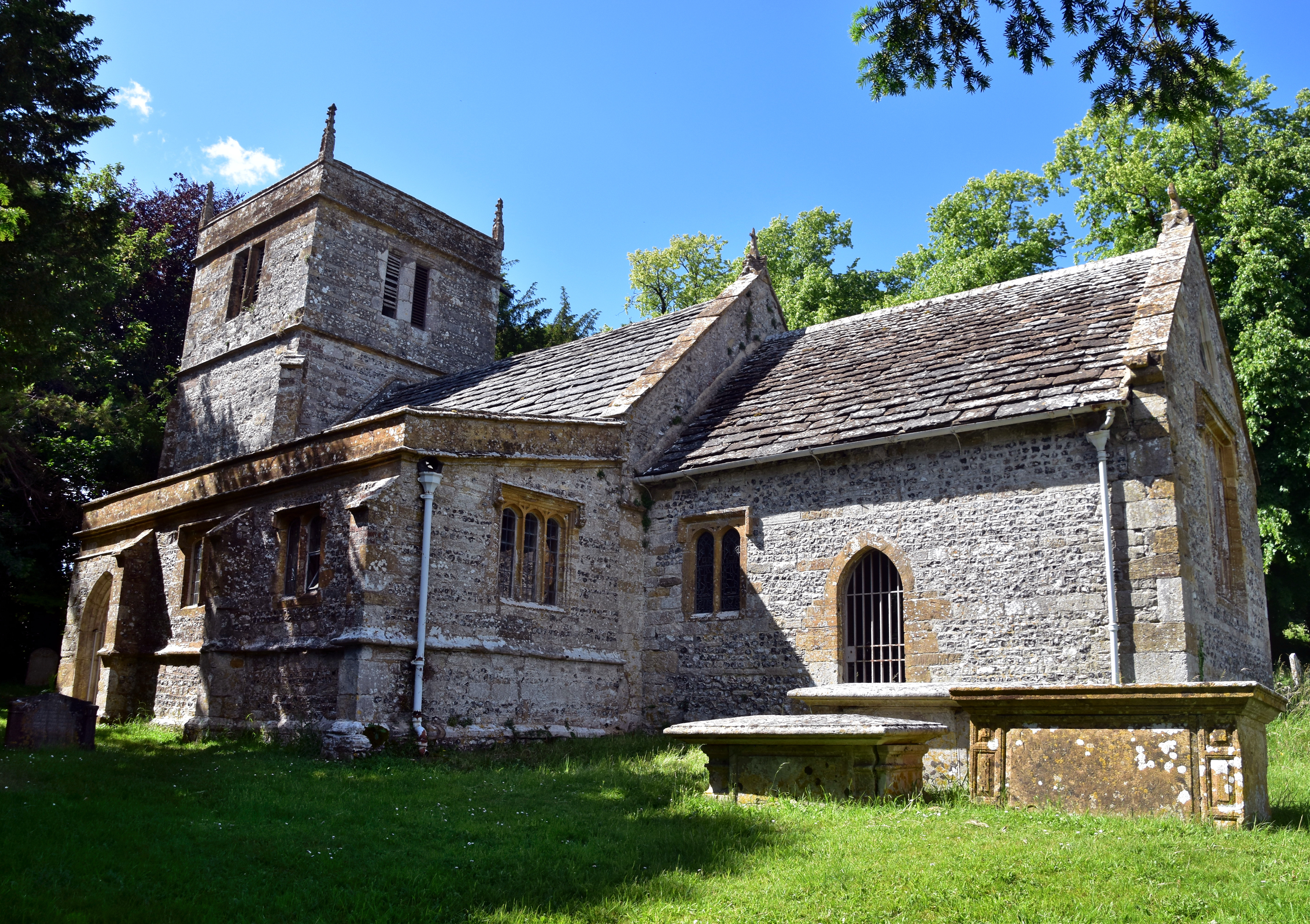
- Parish church of the Holy Trinity, Godmanstone

- Location within Dorset
- Interactive map of Godmanstone
- Population: 166 (2021 census)
- OS grid reference: SY667972
- Unitary authority: Dorset
- Ceremonial county: Dorset
- Region: South West
- Country: England
- Sovereign state: United Kingdom
- Post town: Dorchester
- Postcode district: DT2
- Police: Dorset
- Fire: Dorset and Wiltshire
- Ambulance: South Western
- UK Parliament: West Dorset

Godmanstone (or Godmanston) is a village and civil parish in Dorset in southern England, situated approximately 4 miles (6.4 km) north of the county town Dorchester. Its name means "Godman's Farm" and it is sited by the River Cerne amongst chalk hills of the Dorset Downs.

== The Smiths Arms ==
Godmanstone used to have a pub — The Smiths Arms — which claimed to be the smallest in Britain, with the interior measuring 3.6 metres (12 ft) by 4.6 metres (15 ft). The story attached to the claim was that the original licence was granted by Charles II when he requested that the village blacksmith serve him a glass of porter. The smith refused because he had no licence, so Charles granted him one on the spot and was served his drink. The licence only applied to the smithy; adjacent living quarters, subsequently used by drinkers, were larger. The business closed at the start of 2011.

== Holy Trinity Church ==
The parish church is partly Norman, chiefly perpendicular, with a tower; and was recently repaired. A tune 'Godmanstone' by Cyril Vincent Taylor 1907-1991, vicar of nearby Cerne Abbas 1958-1969, was set in Hymns Ancient and Modern New Standard (#399i), part of which he edited, to the hymn 'Lord, we are blind'.

== Demographics ==
Census population of Godmanstone parish
Census	Population	Female	Male	Households	Source
1921	111				
1931	95				
1951	120				
1961	121				
1971	140				
1981	120				
1991	120				
2001 (Note: In 2001, data reported for Godmanstone was combined with data for Nether Cerne parish.)	171	85	86	67	
2011	156	82	74	63	
2021	166	85	81	67	

== Notable inhabitants ==
Francis Cottington, 1st Baron Cottington (ca.1579–1652) came from Godmanstone. He was the English lord treasurer and ambassador and leader of the pro-Spanish, pro-Roman Catholic faction in the court of Charles I.
