= Barnston Manor =

Listed building in Dorset

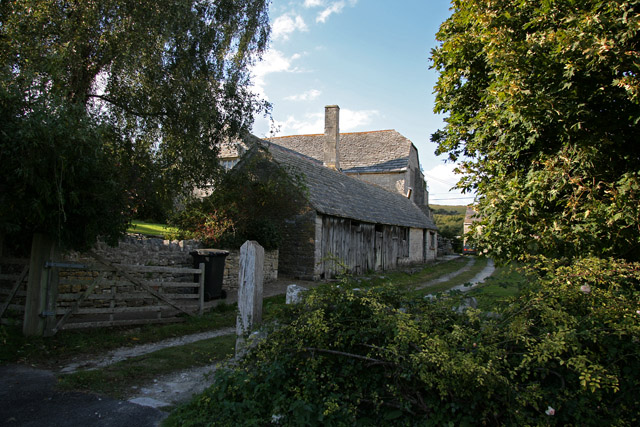
- Barnston Manor in 2004
- Interactive map of the Barnston Manor area

General information
- Status: Completed
- Type: Manor house
- Classification: Grade I
- Location: Church Knowle, Dorset, England, United Kingdom
- Coordinates: 50°38′0″N 2°5′57″W
- Construction started: 13th century

Technical details
- Material: Stone

Barnston Manor is a 13th-century manor house and farm near Church Knowle in Dorset, England. The house is a Grade I listed building, and some farm buildings at the property are also Grade II listed.

== History ==
Barnston Manor was built in the 13th century, around 0.75 miles (1.2 km) from Church Knowle in Dorset, England. It is on the site of a former Saxon house, which may also have been preceded by a Roman house on the site. Barnston Manor is believed to be one of the oldest houses in Dorset. It has been owned by the same family for 700 years; in the 16th century it was owned by local MP John Clavell, and in the 17th century it was lived in by his descendants, until they built Smedmore House.

One chimney in the house is believed to have been added in the 15th century. In the 16th century, Barnston Manor was expanded with the addition of a west wing, as well as stone fireplaces. Since the 16th century, there have been no major upgrades to the building. The former hall in the east wing has been converted into a kitchen and a dairy. The north wing was formerly a chantry chapel, and contains a memorial to the Clavell family. It is believed that the house had a garderobe wing, but this no longer exists. It is also believed to have had a gatehouse and enclosed courtyard until the 19th century. Barnston Manor contains around 3.5 acres (1.4 ha) of land.

Barnston Manor was later used as a farm; a farm building and two barns on the estate are Grade II listed buildings. In 1959, Barnston Manor became a Grade I listed building. In 2018, the building was put up for sale for £1.5 million.

== Architecture ==
Barnston Manor is built in a T-shape. It is built from rubble stone, with ashlar for the outside front walls, and a slate roof. It is architecturally similar to Old Soar Manor in Kent. The house contains a number of 13th century windows, and the south wing is designed as to maximise light. The east wing has a 16th-century stone fireplace, a stone spiral staircase, and 16th-century timbers in the roof. The height of the hall was reduced in the 16th century. The timbers in the west wing roof have been replaced, and the west wing walls are now covered in plaster.
