= Charminster =

Village and civil parish in Dorset, England

Coordinates: 50.7327°N 2.4546°W

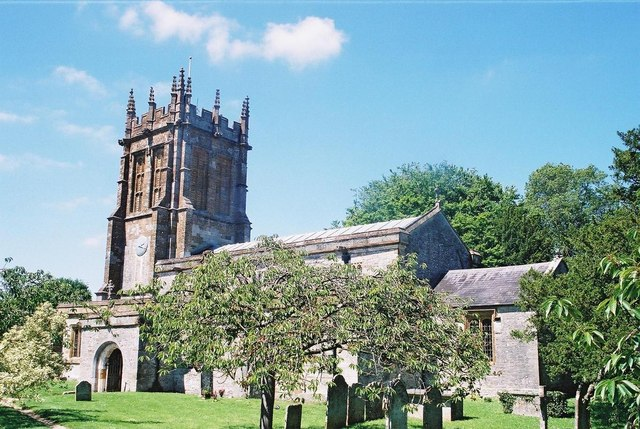
- Parish church of St Mary's

- Location within Dorset
- Population: 2,940
- OS grid reference: SY680927
- Unitary authority: Dorset
- Ceremonial county: Dorset
- Region: South West
- Country: England
- Sovereign state: United Kingdom
- Post town: Dorchester
- Postcode district: DT2
- Dialling code: 01305
- Police: Dorset
- Fire: Dorset and Wiltshire
- Ambulance: South Western
- UK Parliament: West Dorset

Charminster is a village and civil parish in west Dorset, England, situated on the River Cerne and A352 road 1 mile (1.6 km) north of the county town Dorchester. In the 2011 census the parish had a population of 2,940 and also contains the hamlet of Charlton Down.

The village name derives from the River Cerne and the small 'minster' church of St Mary, resulting in "Cerneminster" (recorded in 1223), which eventually evolved into Charminster. The village, which includes Wolfeton House, was the place of origin of Richard Norman and family, one of the Planters of the Massachusetts Bay Colony in America, who arrived there in ca. 1626. Scientist Margaret Bastock died in the village in 1982, aged 62.

Charminster was in the Charminster and Cerne Valley electoral ward, which stretches from the northern outskirts of Dorchester through Cerne Abbas to Minterne Magna. The total population of this ward at the 2011 census was 4,768.

After 2019 structural changes to local government in England, Charminster is part of the Charminster St Mary's ward for elections to Dorset Council.

== Facilities ==
As a relatively large village Charminster has an abundance of amenities, with three pubs, a village hall and a community center with the former having seating capacity in the main hall of 100 seated 120 standing and a further 10 or so in other rooms, as well as a village green at Charminster house used for fetes and community celebrations, beyond this the village has a park and a numerous variety of shops and business with a previously mentioned church and a First school
