= All Saints' Church, Mapperton =

Church in Dorset, England

All Saints' Church
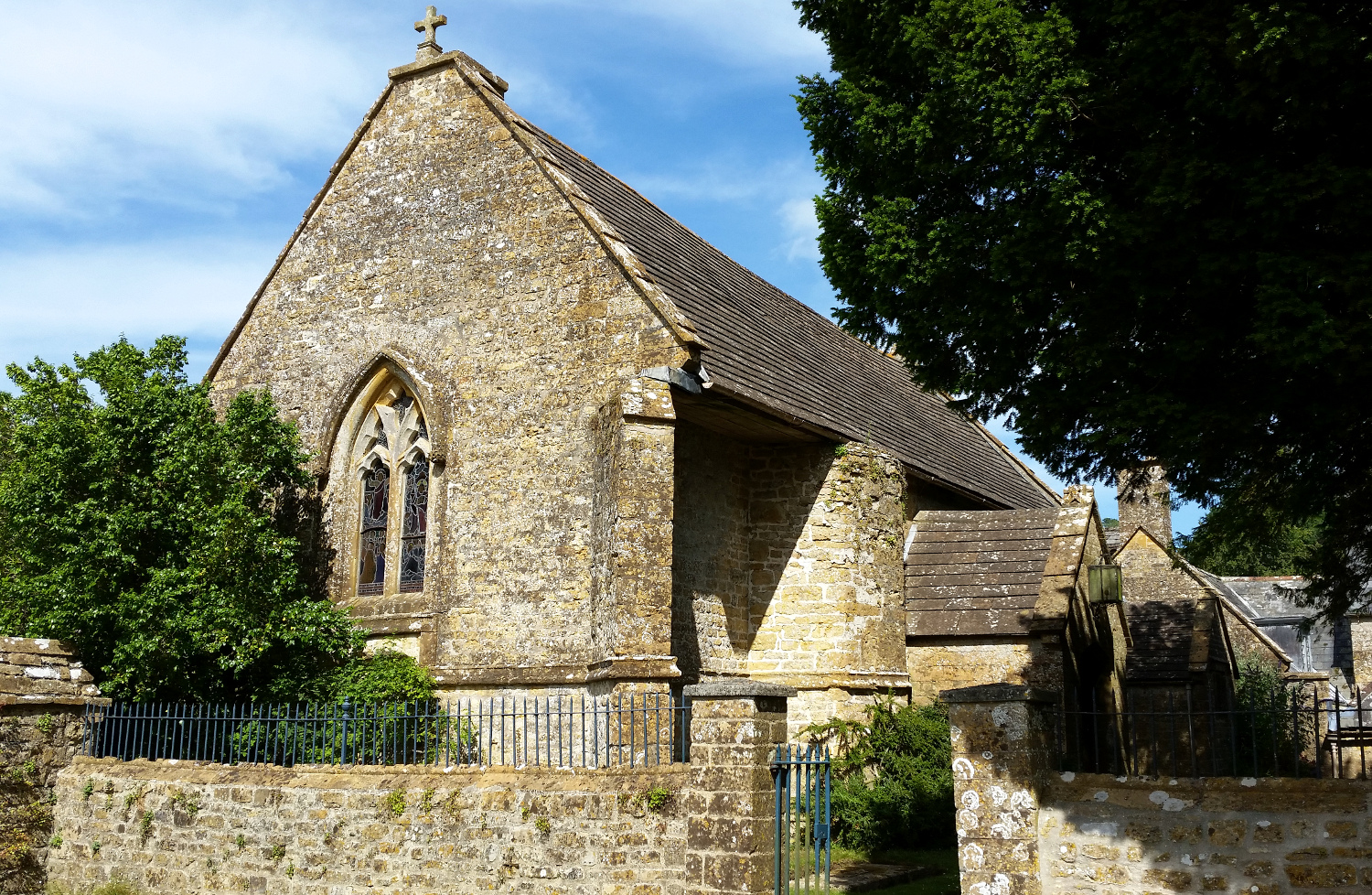

Religion
- Affiliation: Church of England
- Ecclesiastical or organizational status: Private

Location
- Location: Mapperton, Dorset, England
- Interactive map of All Saints' Church
- Coordinates: 50.7943°N 2.7059°W

Architecture
- Type: Church

All Saints' Church is a private church, formerly belonging to the Church of England, in Mapperton, Dorset, England. The church is believed to have 12th century origins, with later additions and rebuilds. It became part of the estate of Mapperton House in 1977 and is a Grade I listed building.

== History ==
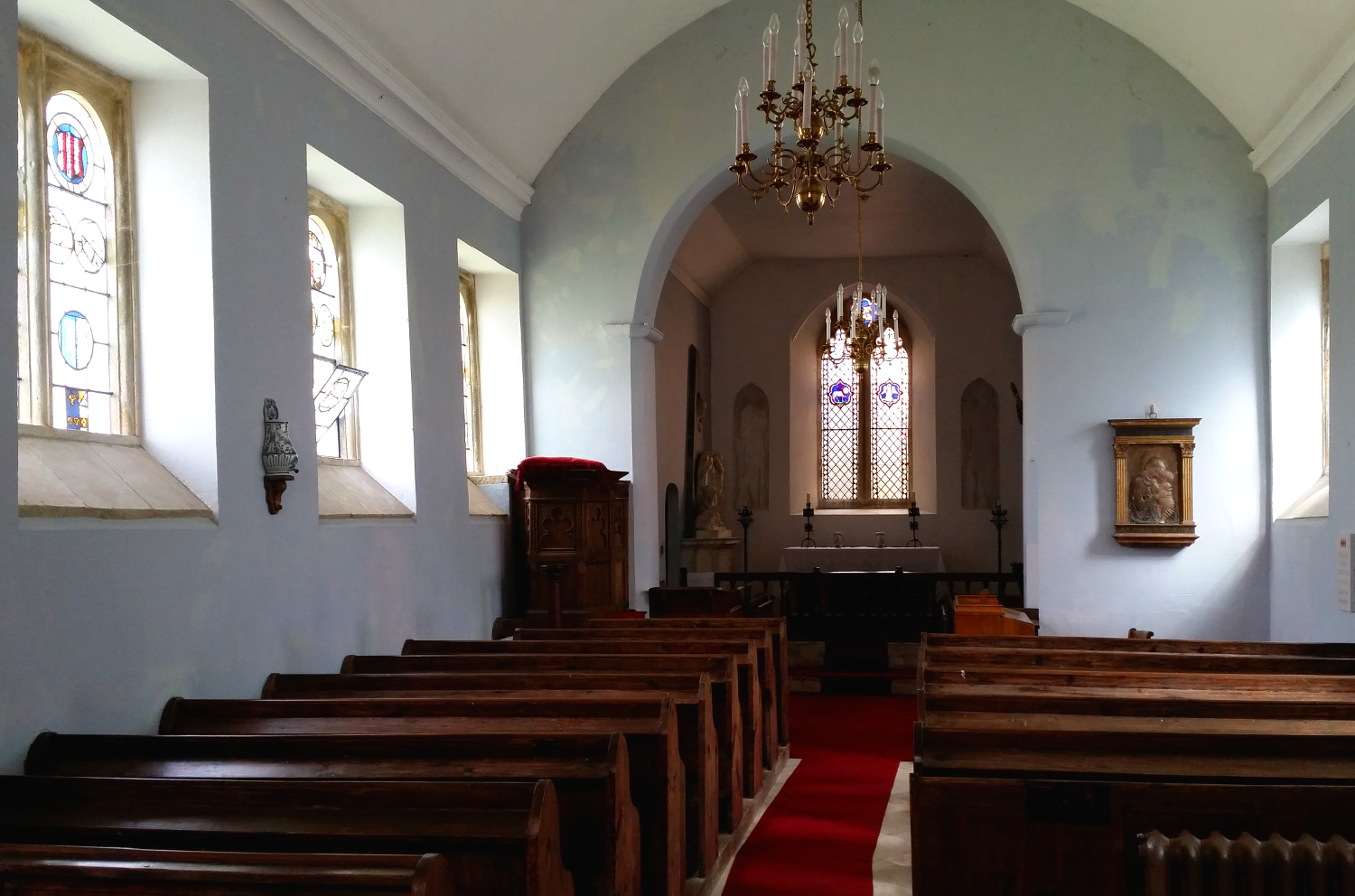
The interior of All Saints' Church.

All Saints is believed to have 12th century origins, with parts of the chancel dating to this period. An early reference to the church, dated 1291, describes it as a chapel to Netherbury. The west tower dates to the 15th century, with repair and alteration work carried out around 1770, which included adding pinnacles and a parapet. Richard Brodrepp had the nave rebuilt in 1704. The church was restored in 1846 and a south porch was added at the same time. The south vestry was added in 1908.

The parish of Mapperton was merged with Melplash in 1971 and this was followed in 1977 with the selling of All Saints as a private chapel to the Mapperton House estate. The church is open to the public during opening hours of the adjacent gardens of Mapperton House. The church is also used for services during the summer season and other events, and can be hired for wedding ceremonies.

== Architecture ==
All Saints is built of rubble and ashlar Ham stone. It is made up of a nave, chancel, south vestry, west tower and south porch. The pinnacles and parapet of the west tower have since been removed and the tower shortened to its bottom stage, allowing it to be incorporated under an extension of the nave's roof. The west end of the roof was then provided with a bell-cot and single bell.

The nave contains three two-light windows each on the north and south sides. Much of the stained glass in the church dates to the 16th and 17th centuries. The two-centred and chamfered chancel arch dates to 1704, and the 13th century reset south doorway contains a panel of the same year, which is inscribed: "Sumptibus Ri. Brodrepp Armig. Anno Dom. 1704". Internal fittings include a font of 12th century date and communion rails of circa 1704. The tower's west window has memorial glass to William Munro Aitchison, dated 1850, and a monument in the chancel to Richard Brodrepp and his children, George and Etheldred, dated 1737. This monument was sculpted by Peter Scheemakers.
