= Martyrs' Cottages =

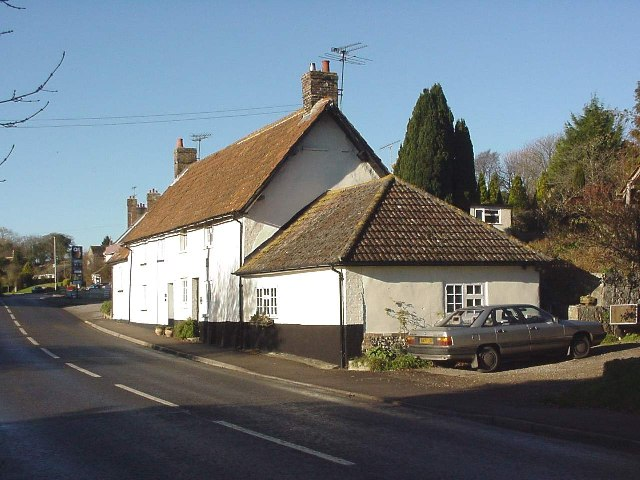
The building which includes the cottage of Thomas Standfield where the martyrs met.

There are several cottages associated with the Tolpuddle Martyrs. Most are in Tolpuddle in Dorset while one is in Essex.

The martyrs usually met in the cottage of Thomas Standfield in Tolpuddle on the Dorchester Road. This cottage and the adjoining, semi-detached cottage were listed for preservation as Grade I in 1956 as the Martyrs' Cottages (50°44′56″N 2°17′32″W). They have since been merged to form a single residence. The two storey building was constructed around the 18th century using a mix of plastered cob and brick.

== History ==
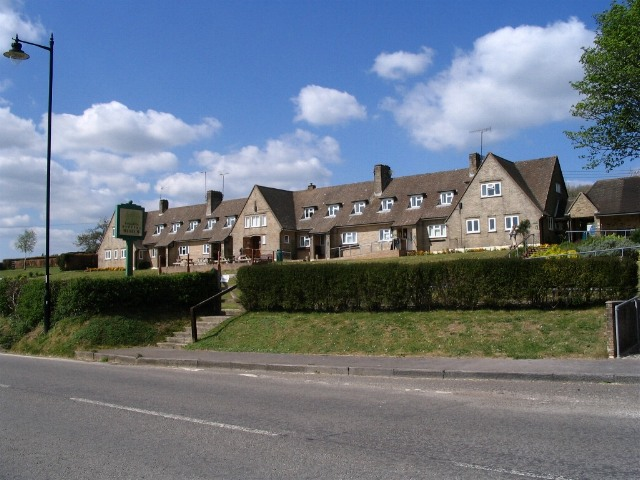
The six cottages built by the TUC for the centenary

In 1934, the Trades Union Congress sponsored a terrace of six cottages in Tolpuddle (50°45′02″N 2°18′05″W) to commemorate the centenary of the martyrs' transportation – each cottage being named after one of the martyrs. These were intended for elderly or infirm agricultural labourers who were commonly evicted from their tied cottages when they retired. A library for the residents developed into a museum about the martyrs and the trade union movement.

In 2009, there was concern in the village that the use of these cottages was being changed – one being used as a shop, one being used by a museum warden and another being considered as a holiday let, while being reserved as a retirement home for the warden. The widow of the warden, who then became the warden herself, was subsequently threatened with eviction when she retired in 2015.

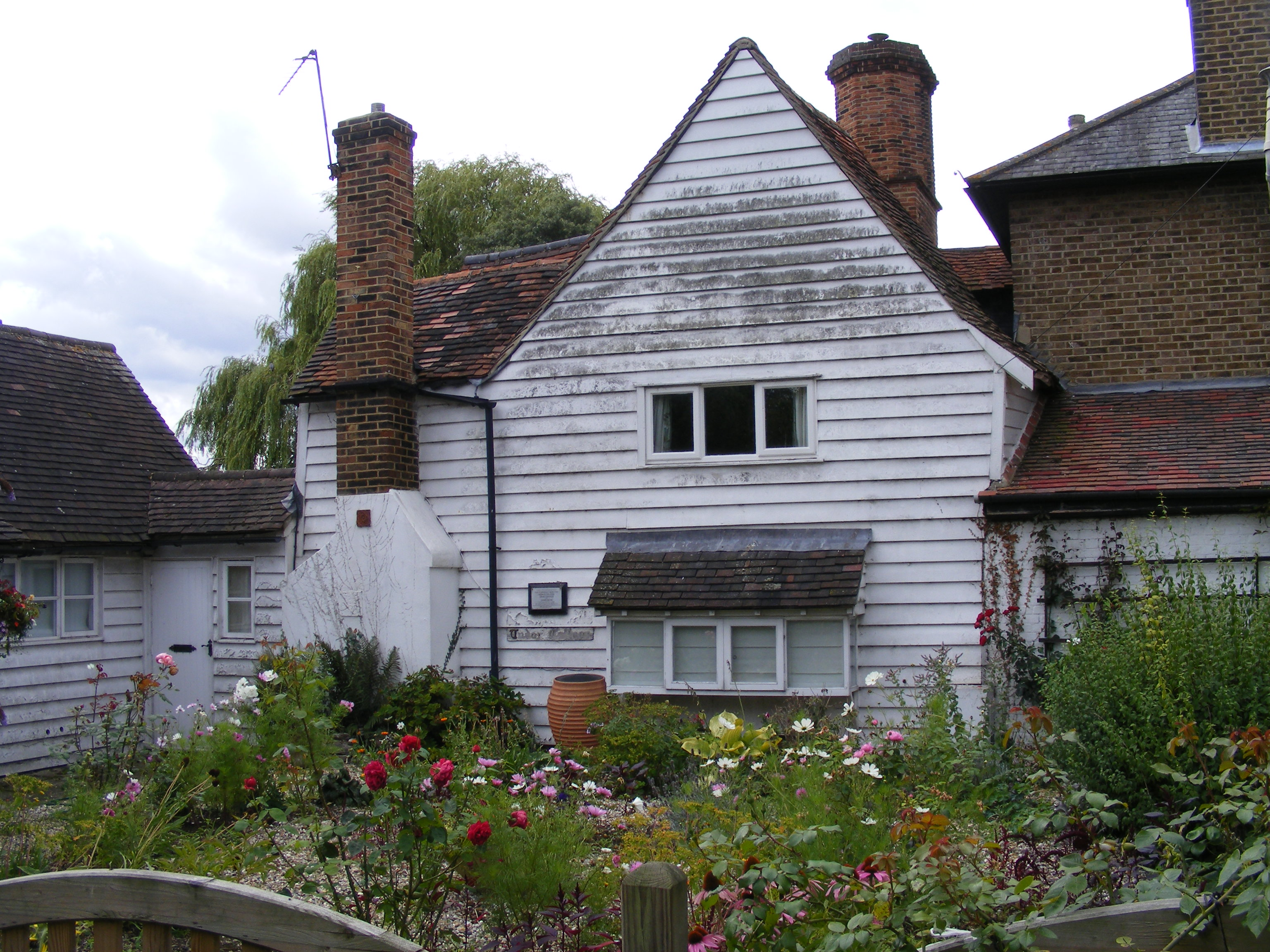
Tudor Cottage in Greensted

Three of the martyrs returned to England after they were pardoned – George and James Loveless and James Brine. They then lived from 1838 to 1844 in a cottage in Greensted which had been built in the 16th century on a core from around the 14th century. This cottage was listed for preservation as grade II in 1984 as the Blackstock and Tudor Cottage (51°42′29″N 0°12′19″E).

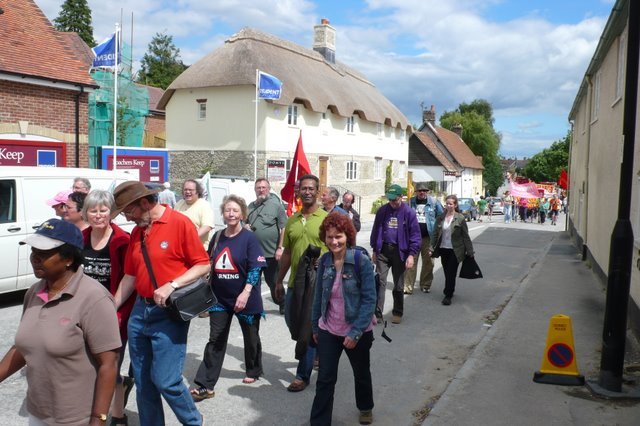
There is an annual march through Tolpuddle to commemorate the martyrs which goes past new thatched cottages which are still being built there.
