= Dorset Ooser =

Wooden head from Melbury Osmond folklore

One of only two known photographs of the original Ooser, taken between 1883 and 1891 by J.W. Chaffins and Sons of Yeovil

The Dorset Ooser (/ˈoʊsər/) is a wooden head that featured in the 19th-century folk culture of Melbury Osmond, a village in the southwestern English county of Dorset. The head was hollow, thus perhaps serving as a mask, and included a humanoid face with horns, a beard, and a hinged jaw which allowed the mouth to open and close. Although sometimes used to scare people during practical jokes, its main recorded purpose was as part of a local variant of the charivari custom known as "skimity riding" or "rough music", in which it was used to humiliate those who were deemed to have behaved in an immoral manner.

The Dorset Ooser was first brought to public attention in 1891, at which time it was under the ownership of the Cave family of Melbury Osmond's Holt Farm. After travelling with Edward Cave to Somerset, the Ooser went missing around 1897. Since then, various folklorists and historians have debated the origins of the head, which has possible connections to the horned costumes sometimes worn by participants in English Mummers plays. The folklorists Frederick Thomas Elworthy and H. S. L. Dewar believed that the head was a representation of the Devil and thus was designed to intimidate people into behaving according to the local community's moral system. Conversely, the folklorist Margaret Murray suggested that it represented a pre-Christian god of fertility whose worship survived in Dorset into the modern period, although more recent scholarship has been highly sceptical of this interpretation. The etymology of Ooser is also disputed, with various possibilities available.

In 1975 a replica of the original Ooser was produced by John Byfleet, which has since been on display at the Dorset Museum in Dorchester. This mask retains a place in Dorset folk culture, being removed from the museum for use in local Morris dancing processions held by the Wessex Morris Men on both St. George's Day and May Day. The design of the Ooser has also inspired the production of copies which have been used as representations of the Horned God in the modern Pagan religion of Wicca in both the United Kingdom and United States.

== Description and etymology ==
A wooden head, the Dorset Ooser had been cut from a single block of timber, with the exception of the lower jaw, which was movable and connected to the rest of the mask by leather hinges. The lower jaw could be moved by pulling on a string which passed through a hole in the upper jaw to connect to the lower. The mask also contained locks of hair on either side of its head, a beard on its chin, and a pair of bullock's horns. Between the Ooser's eyes was a rounded boss, the meaning of which is unknown. The Ooser was hollow, allowing someone to place their own head within it, potentially permitting it to be worn as a mask whilst being supported on the shoulders; however, there were no holes allowing for the wearer to see while wearing it in this way. The historian Ronald Hutton described the Ooser as "a terrifying horned mask with human face, staring eyes, beard, and gnashing teeth". Similarly, the folklorist H. S. L. Dewar stated that "the expression of the eyes [conveyed] a really agonized spirit of hatred, terror, and despair".

The term "Ooser" was pronounced with a short, quick s by villagers as Osser. It is unclear if the head itself was the Ooser, or whether it instead was designed as a depiction of an entity called the Ooser. Dewar suggested the possibility that it might have been connected to the term Wurse, used for the Devil in Layamon's Brut, or to the 17th-century Italian term Oser, again used for the Devil. Alternately, he suggested that it might be a derivative of Guisard or Guiser, two old terms for a mummer. Hutton instead proposed that Osser possibly derived from Wooset, a term used in the dialect around Wiltshire to refer to a pole upon which a horse's skull with deer's horns was affixed. This Wooset was recorded as having been paraded by youths in the Marlborough district until the 1830s, where it was used to mock neighbours whose partners were suspected of marital infidelity, the horns being a traditional sign of cuckoldry. Similar traditions have been recorded in Wiltshire and Somerset, where they can be traced back to at least the early 17th century.

== History ==
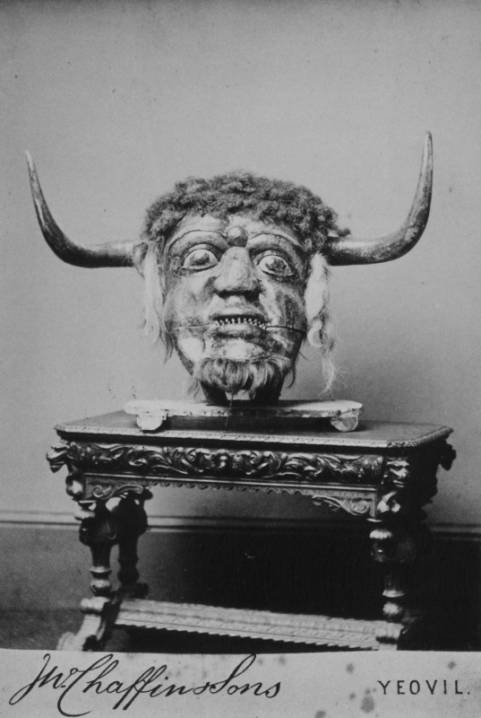
J.W. Chaffins and Sons' other photograph of the Ooser

The first public mention of the Dorset Ooser was in an 1891 edition of Somerset and Dorset Notes and Queries, where it was the subject of an article by the journal's editor, Charles Herbert Mayo. The head was, at the time, in the possession of Thomas Cave of Holt Farm in Melbury Osmond; the editor noted that it had been owned by Cave's family from "time out of mind". Cave had stated that it had formerly been kept in an "old malt-house" in the village, "where it was an object of terror to children who ventured to intrude upon the premises". Mayo noted that it was "possibly the only example now in existence, or at any rate from one of the very few which may still survive in the County", adding that Cave was "willing to dispose of this mask to a lover of objects of antiquarian interest".

At some point before 1897, another member of the family, the doctor Edward Cave, left Holt Farm and moved to Crewkerne in Somerset, taking the Ooser with him. In 1897, he relocated to Bath, leaving the Ooser with his family coachman; when Edward Cave subsequently tried to recover the head, he was informed that it had been "disposed of", with some suggestion that it had found its way to the United States. In 1935, a folklore collector named S. A. Ramsden undertook enquiries into the fate of the head at the prompting of the Egyptologist and folklorist Margaret Murray. His enquiries led him to meet with Cave's coachman, Lawrence, who – after Cave left Crewkerne – had subsequently served as the coachman for Cave's replacement, a doctor by the name of Webber. Lawrence said that Cave left the head in his house in the village, where it was hung up in a loft and began to fall apart; Lawrence recalled wearing it to frighten people during a parade around 1900, at which time the hair was falling out. He said that the house was later pulled down, with the head probably still inside it, in order for a local post office to be constructed in its place.

=== Usage and origins ===
In Somerset and Dorset Notes and Queries, Charles Herbert Mayo noted that "no recollection of its ever being made use of is retained", although thought that "it may plausibly be conjectured" that the Ooser was used in "village revels, and at similar times of rustic entertainment". The following year, the curator of the Dorset County Museum, Henry Joseph Moule, published a note in the same journal relating that their childhood nurse, who was from the village of Cerne Abbas, had talked about the head, and had referred to it as the "Wurser". Moule added that it was "surely" used in Mummers' plays performed at Christmas time. Dewar, after subsequent research, reported the recollections of K. G. Knight—a member of the Melbury Estate staff—that inhabitants of Melbury Osmond associated the head with a folk custom known as "Skimity Riding" or "Rough Music". In this custom, someone accused of "husband-beating, scolding, sexual unfaithfulness or irregularity, and cuckoldry" was made to ride on a donkey or horse, facing the direction of the animal's tail, while the assembled crowd made much noise by beating frying pans, kettles, bulls' horns, and bones. In Melbury Osmond, the Ooser was brought out into the crowd at such an occasion. Similar forms of "mob-punishment" were recorded in parts of neighbouring Devon, where the act was termed "Skimmety Riding", "Skimmington", and "Skivetton". As he deemed it too heavy to be carried or worn by an individual, the historian of folklore Peter Robson later suggested that the Ooser might originally have been mounted in a carnival procession.

"In my childhood [the Ooser] was doing service – at Christmas mummings, surely it was. Our Cerne Abbas nurse was quite up in all relating to the "Wurser", as I should spell it phonetically. I did not know of the horns, indeed in our embryo Latinity we thought the word an attempt at Ursa, if I remember rightly. What crowds of odd bits I could note if, alas, I did but "remember rightly" all nurse's folk-lore and folk-speeches."

— H. J. Moule, Dorchester, 1892.

Dewar also recorded the villagers' claims that the Ooser was brought to the door of a tallet in order to scare the local children, and that it was also used to scare adults on some occasions. Knight came across the claim that it was once used to frighten a stable hand, who jumped through a window to escape it, and in doing so "so injured himself that his life was despaired of". Dewar further drew comparisons with the horned masks sometimes worn during Mummers' plays. He noted that in a case of a group of Christmas Wassailers at Kingscote, Gloucestershire, a man was "dressed in a sack, his head in a real bull's face, head and horns complete". Another case highlighted by Dewar was taken from an account provided by G. W. Greening of Dorchester, in which a member of the Bradstock Mummers was dressed as Beelzebub. Given these similarities, Dewar ultimately suggested that the Ooser was "likely enough an off-shoot from the 14th century and later Mummers' plays". The antiquary Frederick Thomas Elworthy expressed the view that the Dorset Ooser was "the probable head" of a hobby horse. The folklorist E. C. Cawte, in his in-depth study of the hobby horse tradition in English folk culture, stated that although both entailed dressing up in an animalistic costume, the Ooser had no clear connection with this tradition.

Elworthy suggested that the Ooser was a depiction of the Devil, an idea supported by Dewar, who believed that, as the Devil, its imagery was "intended to inspire terror in the minds of the foolish and the wicked". Conversely, others have suggested that it is a depiction of a pre-Christian god. In her 1931 book The God of the Witches, Margaret Murray connected the Ooser to her version of the witch-cult hypothesis—the idea that those tried as alleged witches were adherents of a surviving pre-Christian fertility religion—claiming that the mask was a cult item that reflected continuing worship of the cult's Horned God. Murray's hypothesis is now discredited. The historians Jeffrey B. Russell and Brooks Alexander have stated that "today, scholars are agreed that Murray was more than just wrong [regarding the existence of the witch-cult] – she was completely and embarrassingly wrong on nearly all of her basic premises". The Ooser's pre-Christian origin theory was echoed in the Reader's Digest encyclopaedia of British folklore, Folklore, Myths and Legends of Britain, where it was described as "the idol of a former god of fertility". A gold embossed image of the Ooser was included on the front of the black clothbound encyclopaedia. Although not believing that the Ooser was a specific depiction of a surviving pre-Christian deity, Dewar suggested that the imagery of the Devil, and thus of the Ooser, was originally drawn from the pre-Christian gods of "phallic or fertility worship".

== Contemporary usage and influence ==
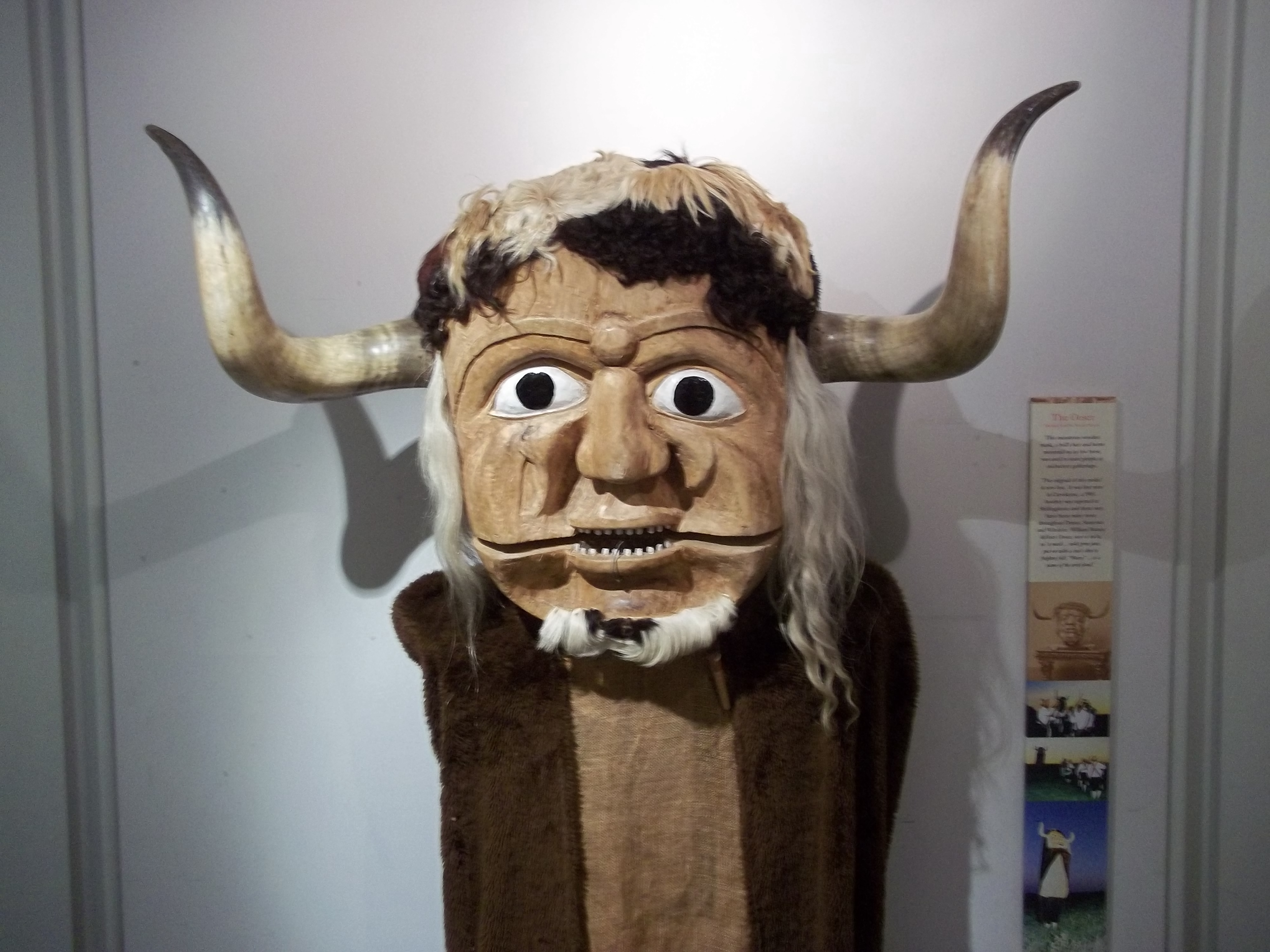
Modern replica of the Dorset Ooser in the Dorset Museum

In 1975 the local Morris dancer John Byfleet made a replica of the original Ooser, which he carved from a log using a penknife. This replica is on display at the Dorset Museum in Dorchester. It is taken from the museum twice a year, on May Day and St. George's Day, when it is used by the Wessex Morris Men as part of their seasonal festivities. In 2005, a journalist from The Guardian reported on a dawn ceremony performed by the troupe on May Day atop Giant Hill near Cerne Abbas. The ceremony involved one member carrying the Dorset Ooser replica atop his head, with other Morris men dancing around him; after the rite they proceeded, still dancing, to a local pub, the Red Lion. In summer 2006, the Wessex Morris Men took the replica to Melbury Osmond for the first time, where they performed a dance in a local street.

Murray's interpretation of the Ooser was embraced by Doreen Valiente, an earlier practitioner of the modern Pagan religion of Wicca, who stated that the mask "is certainly connected with the Old Religion [i.e. the witch-cult], and that from a long way back". The Gardnerian Wiccan Melissa Seims suggested that the iconography of the Ooser was an influence on the design of the Head of Atho, a statue of the Wiccan Horned God created by Raymond Howard in mid-20th century England. Wiccans in the Minnesota area of the United States make use of a head with stag antlers that they term the Minnesota Ooser. Representing the religion's Horned God, it is kept on an altar and brought out for use in Sabbat rituals.

The Ooser has been used in modern anti-urbanisation demonstrations as a symbolic guardian of the countryside, and in the logo of the Dorset Roller Derby team.
