= Rogue's March =

Rogue's March may refer to:

- The Rogue's March, a derisive piece of music used e.g. for drumming out delinquent soldiers.
- Rogue's March (film), 1953 film directed by Allan Davis
- Rogue's March (album), 1999 album by American Steel
