= Melbury Osmond =

Village in Dorset, England

Coordinates: 50.8674°N 2.6062°W

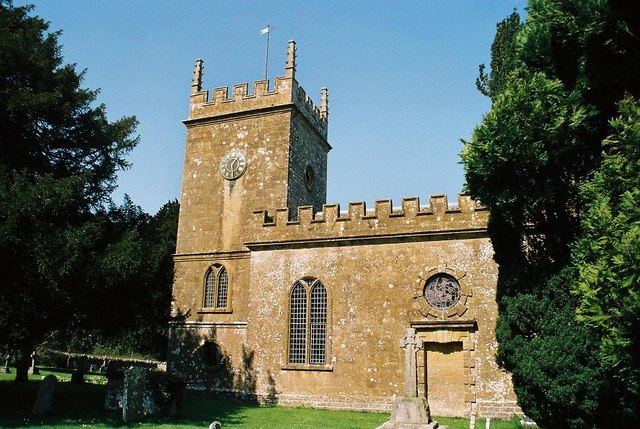
- Parish church of St Osmund

- Location within Dorset
- Population: 199
- OS grid reference: ST574077
- Unitary authority: Dorset
- Ceremonial county: Dorset
- Region: South West
- Country: England
- Sovereign state: United Kingdom
- Post town: Dorchester
- Postcode district: DT2
- Police: Dorset
- Fire: Dorset and Wiltshire
- Ambulance: South Western
- UK Parliament: West Dorset

Melbury Osmond is a village and civil parish in the county of Dorset in southern England. It lies approximately 7 miles (11 km) south of the Somerset town of Yeovil. The underlying geology is Cornbrash limestone, with adjacent Oxford clay. Within the clay can be found deposits of stone which can take on a very high polish, earning them the name "Melbury marble". The village is mentioned in the Domesday Book as a possession of the Arundell family, and remained so until the 19th century. The parish church of St Osmund, was totally rebuilt in 1745 and restored in 1888, although it has registers dating back to 1550. In the 2011 census the parish had a population of 199.

The major part of Melbury Osmond village lies on a cul-de-sac lane which from the church descends past cottages to a stream and ford. The attractive appearance of the village has been noted by commentators: it has been described as "a calendarsmith's dream of thatched cottages" and in 1906 Sir Frederick Treves wrote that it was "the most charming village in these Western backwoods".

In its history the village has been involved in the trade of plated buckles and horn buttons, and the manufacture of dowlas. During the 19th century, the village was home to the Dorset Ooser, a wooden mask brought out during "Rough Music" ceremonies.

There are 34 listed buildings and structures within the parish, including the Grade II* Old Rectory and the Grade I parish church.

Thomas Hardy's mother lived in Melbury Osmond as a child, and she was married in the church. The village appears as "Little Hintock" in Hardy's novel The Woodlanders, in which the heroine's name is "Grace Melbury". Hardy also incorporated a legend about the Duke of Monmouth taking refuge in one of the village's cottages into his short story "The Duke's Reappearance".
