= Hamrick (surname) =

Hamrick is a surname. Notable people with the surname include:

- Charley Hamrick (1912–1963), American football player
- Chris Hamrick (born 1966), American professional wrestler
- John Hamrick (1876–1956), American businessman
- Melanie Hamrick (born 1987), American dancer, choreographer, author
- Mike Hamrick, American athletic director
- Ray Hamrick (1921–2009), American baseball player
- Samuel J. Hamrick (1929–2008), American writer
