= Pack Monday Fair =

Annual street fair in Sherborne, Dorset

Pack Monday Fair is an annual street fair held in the country town of Sherborne in Dorset, starting on the Monday following 10 October (Old Michaelmas Day). Originally an agricultural fair, it is now devoted to stalls, sideshows and a funfair.

== Origins ==
The origins of the fair are unknown, though it must be of some antiquity as John Hutchins in the second edition of his History and Antiquities of the County of Dorset (1815) states that it has been an "immemorial custom", for boys and young men to blow horns in the evenings in the streets for some weeks before the fair "to the no small annoyance of their less wakeful neighbours". The fair was ushered in by cows' horns and by the ringing of the great bell at a very early hour of the morning. It was a great holiday for the inhabitants of the town and neighbourhood.

According to one local tradition, set out in William Hone’s Every Day Book of 1826, the fair and its noisy announcement originated at the completion of the building of Sherborne Abbey when the workmen ‘packed up’ their tools and “held a fair or wake, in the churchyard, blowing cows' horns in their rejoicing”.

The folklorist Steve Roud in his 2006 book The English Year suggests that the word ‘pack’ in the title of the fair is in fact more likely to refer to the day on which workers packed up their belongings to move house at the end of the annual term of employment, Old Michaelmas Day being one of the most common days for the annual move. Alternatively, ‘pack’ may relate to itinerant sellers and their wares (as in ‘pack-man’ or ‘packhorse’). The theory that ‘pack’ is a dialect term for the ‘pacts’ made between farmers and workers at the fair he considers unlikely as that usage is not known locally.

== 18th- and 19th-Century fair ==
A diary entry written by Richard Bellamy, a local solicitor's articled clerk, describes an evening performance at the town's Swan Inn during the fair of 1794:

In the evening about 7 o’clock I went to the Swan and saw Sieur Richards the Showman perform all sorts of conjuration – a great number of people attended this grand exhibition, a large number of gentlemen and ladies, and all Mr Cutler’s schoolboys. This Richards performed all sorts of conjuration with the Cards, Cups and Balls and other different things which he did quite clever; he also imitated different kinds of birds. And at the same place we saw a little double jointed woman, being about 3 feet tall and remarkably strong, this was an American woman. This exhibition lasted about two hours in the whole, and we saw all of it for 6d each, which was very well worth the money.

An extensive description of the fair in the early 19th century, when the whole town was taken over by the event, appears in William Hone's Every Day Book of 1826. The fair is described as

a mart for the sale of horses, cows, fat and lean oxen, sheep, lambs, and pigs; cloth, earthenware, onions, wall and hazle nuts, apples, fruit trees, and the usual nick nacks for children, toys, gingerbread, sweetmeats, plums, &c. &c. with drapery, hats, bonnets, caps, ribbands, &c. for the country belles, of whom, when the weather is favourable, a great number is drawn together from the neighbouring villages … [The fair] is annually announced three or four weeks previously by all the little urchins who can procure and blow a cow's horn, parading the streets in the evenings, and sending forth the different tones of their horny bugles, sometimes beating an old saucepan or a drum, to render the sweet sound more delicious, and not unfrequently a whistle-pipe or a fife is added to the band. The clock's striking twelve on the Sunday night previous, is the summons for ushering in the fair

== Teddy Roe's Band ==
The custom of announcing the fair with rough music continues to the present day. Teddy Roe's (or Rowe's) Band, as it is now known, is made up of the youth of the town and makes a great deal of noise with tin cans, horns and whistles.

Teddy Roe is by tradition supposed to be the foreman of the masons who were working on the fan vault of Sherborne Abbey in 1490. They were given a day off to visit the fair, packed up their tools, and marched in joyful procession to the fairground. Roud states, however, that this story is without foundation, and that the heralding of fairs with noisy processions of this type is known from many other examples up and down the country.

Teddy Roe's band was suppressed in the 1960s, because of the potential for rowdyism it offered, but the tradition re-emerged.
