= St Osmund's Church, Melbury Osmond =

Church in Dorset, England

St Osmund's Church
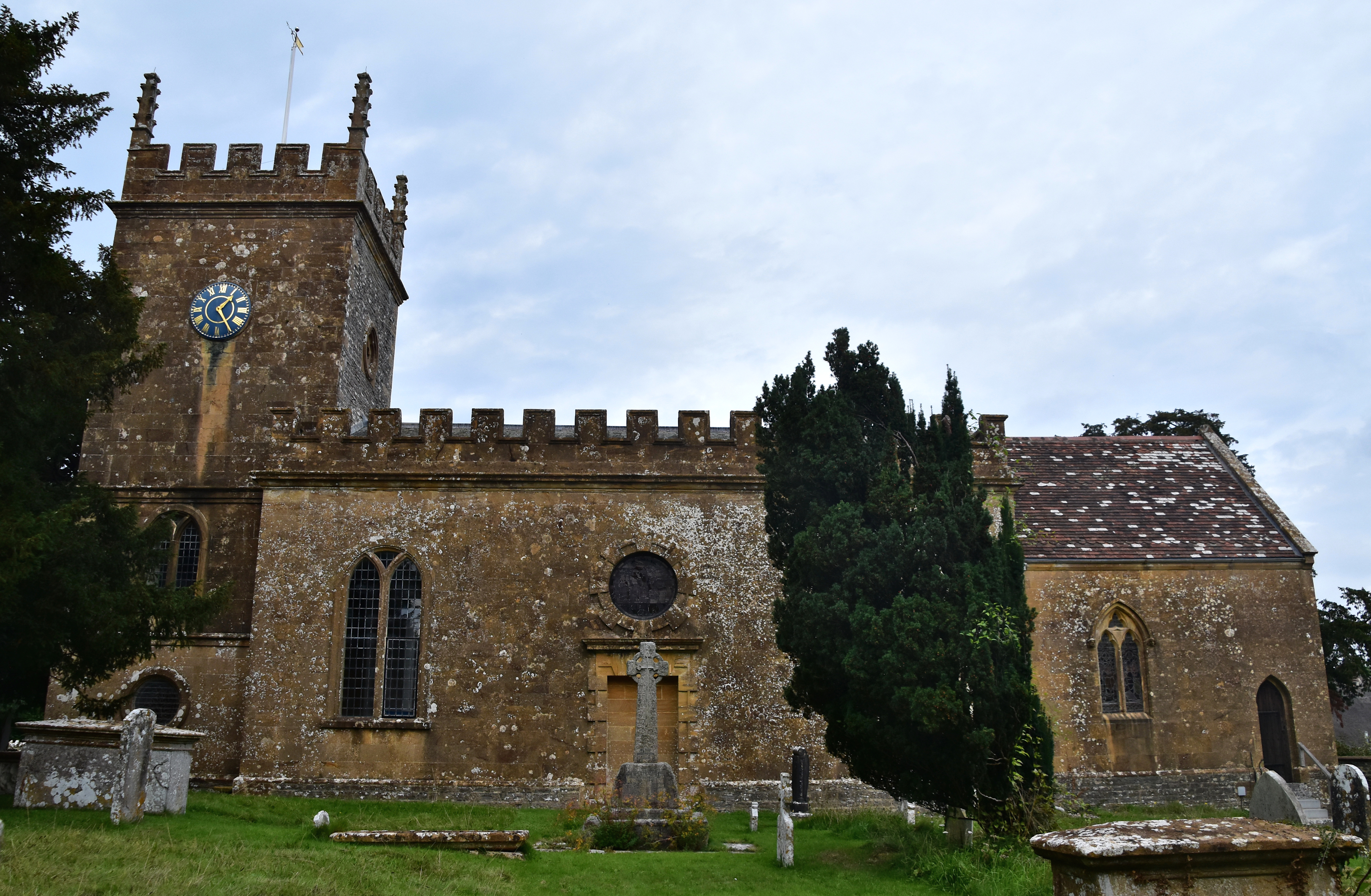

Religion
- Affiliation: Church of England
- Ecclesiastical or organizational status: Active

Location
- Location: Melbury Osmond, Dorset, England
- Country: United Kingdom
- Interactive map of St Osmund's Church
- Coordinates: 50.8684°N 2.6067°W

Architecture
- Type: Church

Listed Building – Grade I
- Official name: Parish Church of St Osmond, Melbury Osmond
- Designated: 11 November 1966
- Reference no.: 1119242

St Osmund's Church is a Church of England parish church at Melbury Osmond, Dorset, England. The church is a Grade I listed building.

== History ==
Much of the church dates to a rebuild in the 18th century, but a church has been present on the same site since at least the 11th century. The west tower was built in the 15th century and the tower arch and walling above dates to this period. The tower and the rest of the church building, described then as being in a ruinous state, was taken down and rebuilt on the same foundation in 1745 at the expense of Susanna Strangways Horner, who also provided the church with new fittings including pews, font, and altarpiece.

The church closed in August 1888 for restoration work and reopened on 28 November 1888. The restoration was carried out at the expense of the Earl of Ilchester to the designs of architect Sir Arthur Blomfield. It saw the appearance of the interior "greatly altered". The work included the removal of the west gallery, the building of a vestry, adding a new roof, with an oak panelled ceiling, the closing of the south door to provide twenty additional sittings, the conversion of the west door into the main entrance, the building of a new chancel arch, laying new tile flooring, raising the altar, and replacing the high oak pews with open benches. During the work removing the gallery, a Gothic arch was rediscovered, the head of which had been cut away to form the doorway to the gallery. Upon removing the outside steps leading up to the gallery, an old Norman font of Ham Hill stone was discovered built into the masonry. It was retained and returned to its original nearby niche which was found hidden behind plaster at the base of the Gothic arch. A carved grotesque head was also discovered and was built into the south wall of the new vestry. The church bells, silent for many years, were restored along with the tower's clock, at the expense of the parishioners. One bell was cracked and was recast at the Llewellyn & Co foundry in Bristol.

On 10 April 1889, the Bishop of Salisbury, John Wordsworth, dedicated an extension to the churchyard. The original churchyard had become crowded and the Earl of Ilchester gifted and enclosed an additional plot on the west side of the church.

The chancel was lengthened in 1910 at the cost of the rector, Rev. Herbert Foley Napier, and he was also responsible for the reredos and chancel ceiling. A heating system was installed in 1930, followed by electric lighting in 1936. The bells underwent refurbishment in 1950 and a ringing chamber was added in the tower in 1955.

== Architecture ==
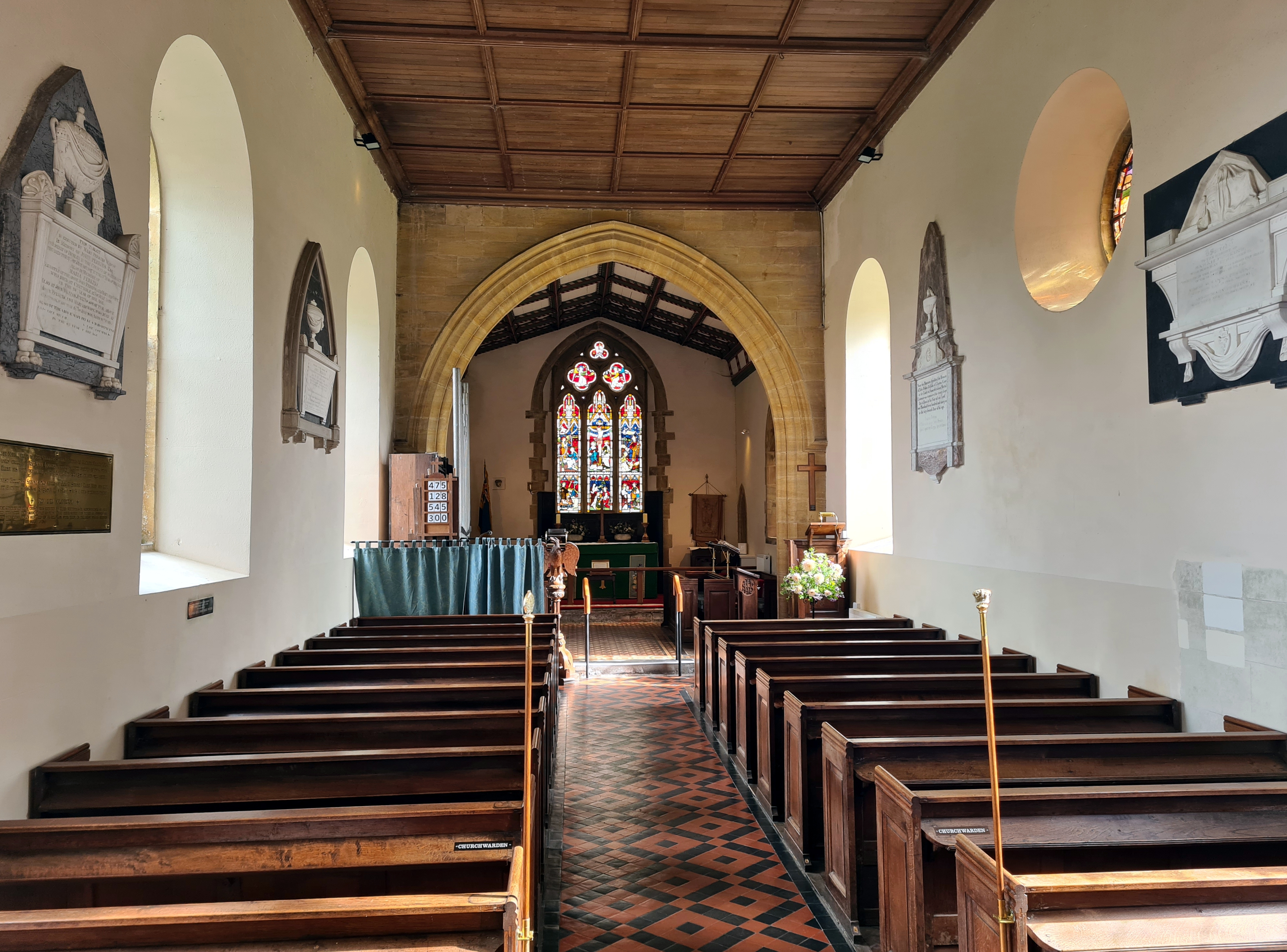
The interior of St Osmund's Church.

St Osmund's is built of rubble stone, with ashlar-faced stone on the south side, and slate roofs. It is made up of a nave, chancel, west tower and south porch. The three-stage tower contains five bells, including one initialled E.T., I.P., R.E., dated 1635, two by William Ellery, dated 1752 and 1753, and one by William Ellery and Thomas Roskelly, dated 1757. The weather vane on top of the tower is dated 1825. In the north wall of the chancel is a carved stone fragment of a "frog-like beast in interlaced foliage" believed to date to the late 10th or early 11th century.

== Listed monuments ==
In the churchyard of St Osmund's are the following Grade II listed monuments:

- Two unidentified table tombs, one 17th century and the other late 18th century
- John Sherston, table tomb, 1716
- Mary Flanders, square pedestal, 1791
- Susannah Cave, square pedestal, 1976
