= Charles Herbert Mayo =

English clergyman and antiquarian

Charles Herbert Mayo (1845–1929) was a Dorset clergyman and antiquarian.

== Life ==
Mayo was born in 1845, the third of three children of William Mayo, the rector of Folke, and his wife Charlotte (née Dyer).

He received a Master of Arts degree from Lincoln College, Oxford. He was appointed Rural Dean and Non-Residentiary Canon of Salisbury and was vicar of Longburton from 1872 to 1912. Whilst there he lived at Longburton Rectory.

His great enthusiasm was local history and he promoted its study by publishing many books and articles on the subject, of which 34 are held in the British Library. His greatest work was the Bibliotheca Dorsetiensis published in 1885, which has yet to be supplanted as the standard Dorset antiquarian bibliography. This was derived from his large personal collection of Dorset ephemera and publications.

From 1888 until 1921 Canon Mayo was the Dorset Editor of the journal 'Somerset and Dorset Notes and Queries'. He also transcribed many of the registers of local parishes, the municipal records of the Borough of Shaftesbury and the Civil War Minutes of the Dorset Standing Committee, 1646–50. He wrote A Genealogical Account of the Mayo and Elton Families originally published as a limited edition of 50 copies in 1882 but enlarged for a new edition in 1908.

Mayo supported women's suffrage. He died unmarried in 1929.

== Legacy ==
Mayo's correspondence and research papers are now held by the Dorset History Centre, except for a collection of typewritten notes about the Mayo family held by the Bodleian Library, and two volumes of notes about Bristol and Gloucestershire families held by the Gloucestershire Record Office.

== Bibliography ==
- Charles Herbert Mayo, A Genealogical Account of the Mayo and Elton Families of the Counties of Wiltshire and Hereford; with an Appendix Containing Genealogies for the Most Part Not Hitherto Published of Certain Families By Marriage to the Family of Mayo, (London: Chiswick Press, 1882)
- Charles Herbert Mayo, Bibliotheca Dorsetiensis, (Chiswick: C. Whittingham and Co., 1885)
- Charles Herbert Mayo, The municipal records of the borough of Shaftesbury : a contribution to Shastonian history, (Sherborne: J.C. & A.T. Sawtell, 1889)
- Frederic William Weaver and Charles Herbert Mayo (eds.), Somerset and Dorset Notes and Queries, Volumes 1–16 (Sherborne: J.C. & A.T. Sawtell, 1889–1920)
- Charles Herbert Mayo, The Registers of Lydlinch, Dorset 1559–1812 (London: Parish Record Society, 1899)
- Charles Herbert Mayo (ed.), The minute books of the Dorset Standing Committee 23 September 1646, to 8 May 1650, (Exeter: William Pollard, 1902)
- Charles Herbert Mayo, A Plea for Female Suffrage in the Election of a Representative Church Council, (Sherborne: J. C. and A. T. Sawtell, 1903)
- Charles Herbert Mayo, A Genealogical Account of the Mayo & Elton Families of Wiltshire and Herefordshire and Some Other Adjoining Counties, Together with Numerous Biographical Sketches, (London: Chiswick Press, 1908) 2nd edition.
- Charles Herbert Mayo (ed.), The municipal records of the borough of Dorchester, (Exeter: William Pollard, 1908)
- Charles Herbert Mayo, Our Bit, a record of the Mayo family's contribution to World War I (privately published; a copy resides in the Bodleian, complete with handwritten note, and copies remain with present-day descendants as well)
- Charles Herbert Mayo, The official guide to the Abbey Church of St. Mary the Virgin, Sherborne, (Sherborne: F.Bennett & Co., 1925)
- Charles Herbert Mayo, A historic guide to the almshouse of St. John Baptist and St. John the Evangelist, Sherborne, (Oxford: University Press, 1926)
