= Drumming out =

Idiom for expulsion in disgrace, especially from the military

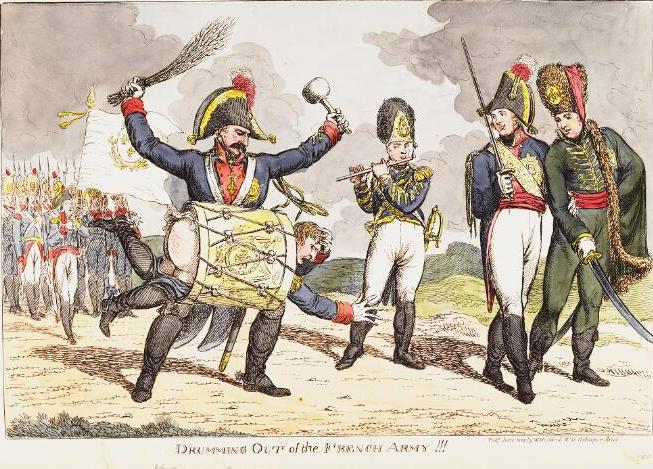
Satirical cartoon representing Napoleon's exile to Elba.

Drumming out is the historical act of being dishonorably dismissed from military service to the sound of the Rogue's March or a drum. In modern figurative usage, it may refer to any act of expulsion or dismissal in disgrace.

== Origin ==
One of the earliest recorded references to drumming out occurs in Alexander Pope's Moral Essays, 3rd epistle, 1731–1733: "Chartres was a man infamous for all manner of vices. When he was an ensign in the army, he was drummed out of the regiment for a cheat; he was next banished Brussels, and drummed out of Ghent, on the same account."

It also occurs in a figurative sense in Thomas Amory's 1766 Life of John Buncle: "They ought to be drummed out of society."

== American Revolutionary War ==
The earliest known discharge of an American soldier by drumming out involved the drumming out of Moses Pickett for “Disobedience of orders, and damning his Officers,” Washington reviewed the sentence and approved its enforcement. He instructed that it be carried out in General Orders for 15 September 1775.

== American Civil War ==
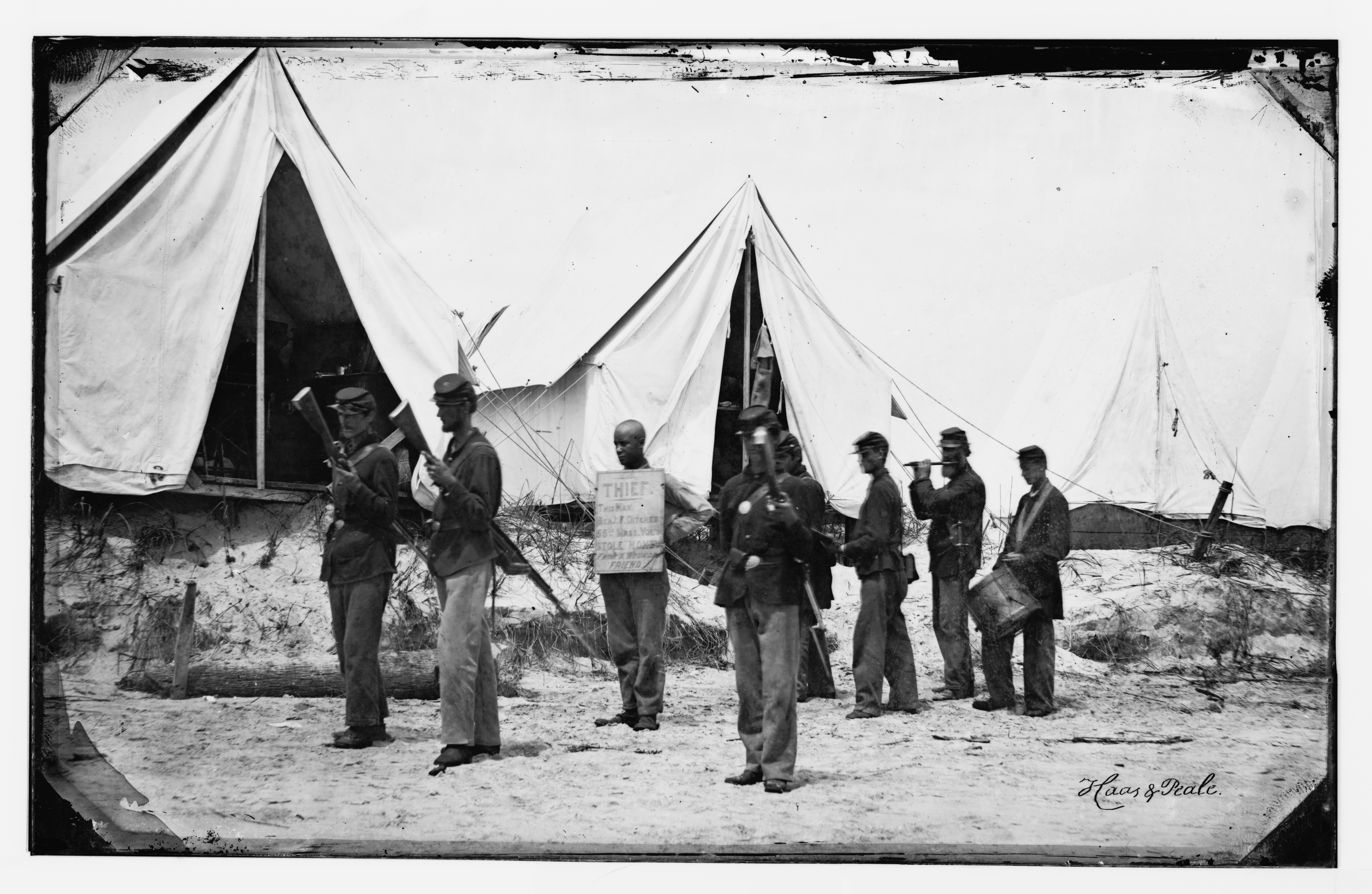
Morris Island, 1863. A soldier is drummed out of camp to the Rogue's March. The sign says he "stole money from a wounded friend".

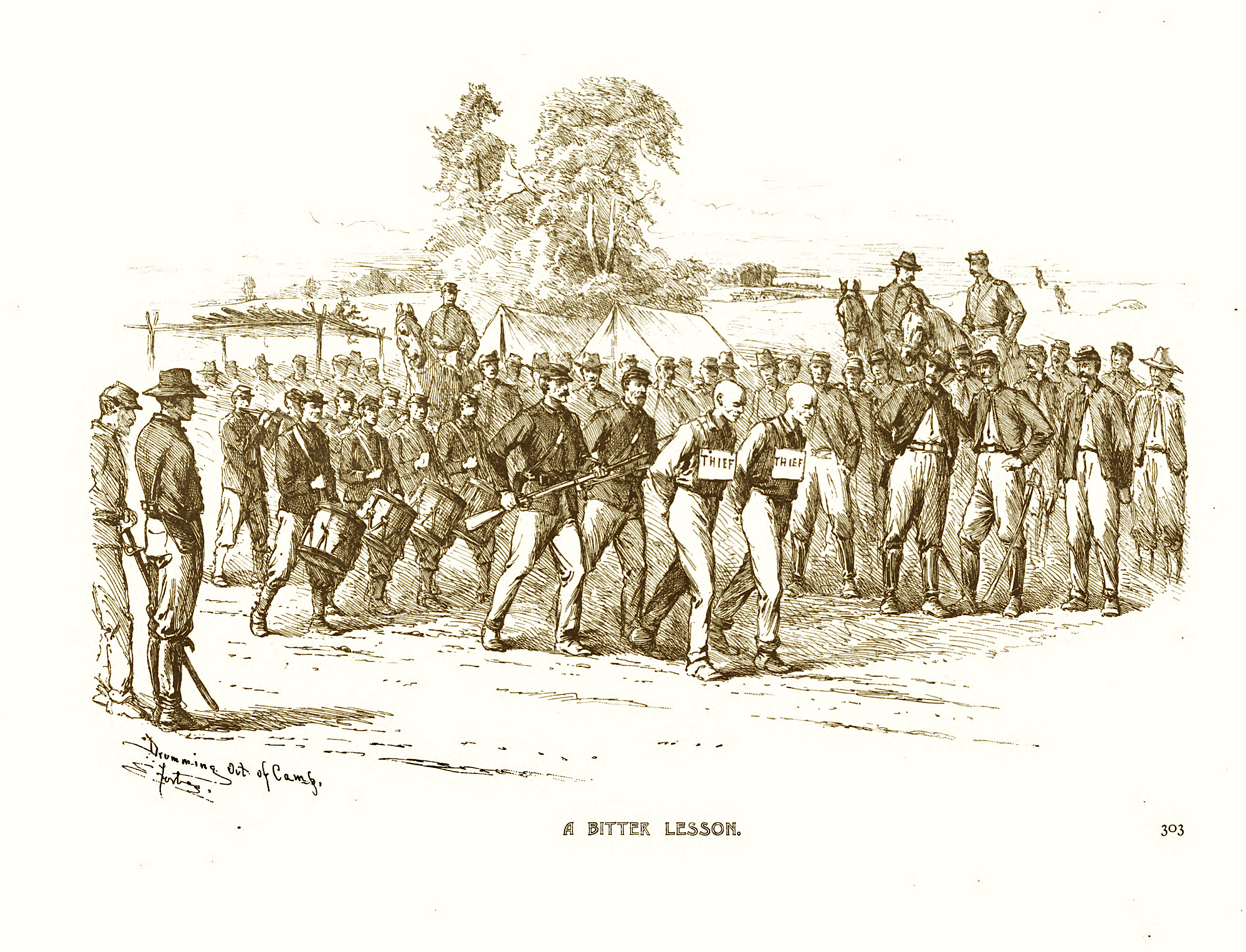
Based on a contemporary sketch: Two thieves are drummed out of the Union Army to the Rogue's March. Semi-shaving of heads was typical.

American Civil War officers drummed out of service might have their heads shaved and their uniforms stripped of insignia and be paraded in front of their comrades. Fellow officers were forbidden to touch the person being dishonorably discharged, but in more than one case after the war had ended, a drummed-out man was found dead after receiving a beating from his former comrades. When someone was being drummed out, the tune "Rogue's March" would be played.

== See also ==
- Cashiering
