= Frederick Thomas Elworthy =

English philologist and antiquary

Frederick Thomas Elworthy (1830–1907) was an English philologist and antiquary.

== Life ==
He was the eldest son of Thomas Elworthy, woollen manufacturer of Wellington, Somerset, and his wife Jane, daughter of William Chorley of Quarm, near Dunster. He was born at Wellington on 10 January 1830, and was educated at a private school at Denmark Hill. Though studious from boyhood, he did not enter on authorship until middle life.

He became eminent first as a philologist and later as a writer on folklore. His two books on the evil eye and kindred superstitions contain much curious information gathered during travels in Spain, Italy, and other countries, in the course of which he made perhaps the finest collection of charms, amulets, and such-like trinkets in existence; this collection was in the possession of his widow until her death and was then bequeathed to the Somersetshire Archæological Society's museum at Taunton. He contributed to Archæologia, was the council of the Philological Society, and in 1891-6 was editorial secretary of the Somersetshire Archæological Society, for whose Proceedings, as well as for those of the Devonshire Association, he wrote some valuable papers.

He was elected F.S.A. on 14 June 1900. He was a good linguist and possessed considerable skill as a draughtsman and as an artist in watercolors. He was a prominent churchman, and the erection of All Saints' Church, Wellington, was largely due to his liberality and exertions. He was a magistrate, a churchwarden, an active member of the Wellington school board, and a prominent freemason.

After an illness which began in the summer of 1906, he died at his residence, Foxdown, Wellington, on 13 December 1907, and was buried in the churchyard of the parish church there.

== Works ==
- 1875: The Dialect of West Somerset (The dialect of West Somerset. - An outline of the grammar of the dialect of West Somerset. - West Somerset word-book.) 2 vols. London: Trübner for the English Dialect Society, 1875-1886
- 1895: The Evil Eye : an account of this ancient and widespread superstition. London: John Murray
- 1900: Horns of Honour: and other studies in the by-ways of archeology. London: John Murray
