= Charivari =

Folk custom shaming a community member

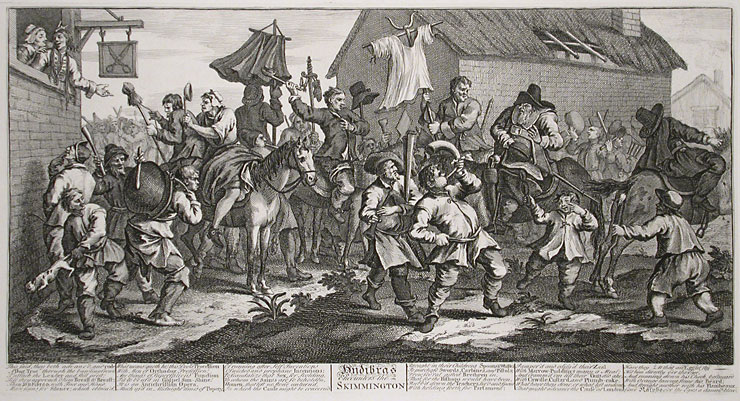
William Hogarth's engraving "Hudibras Encounters the Skimmington" (illustration to Samuel Butler's Hudibras)

Charivari (/ˌʃɪvəˈriː, ˈʃɪvəriː/, UK also /ˌʃɑːrɪˈvɑːri/, US also /ʃəˌrɪvəˈriː/, alternatively spelled shivaree or chivaree and also called a skimmington) was a European and North American folk custom designed to shame a member of the community, in which a mock parade was staged through the settlement accompanied by a discordant mock serenade. Since the crowd aimed to make as much noise as possible by beating on pots and pans or anything that came to hand, these parades were often referred to as rough music.

Parades were of three types. In the first and generally most violent form, an alleged wrongdoer (or wrongdoers) might be dragged from their home or place of work and paraded by force through a community. In the process, the victim was subject to the derision of the crowd and might be pelted, and was frequently dunked at the end of the proceedings. A safer form involved a neighbour of the wrongdoer impersonating the victim while being carried through the streets. The impersonator was not themselves punished, and often cried out or sang ribald verses mocking the wrongdoer. In the common form, an effigy was employed instead, abused and often burnt at the end of the proceedings.

Communities used "rough music" to express their disapproval of different types of violation of community norms. For example, they might target marriages of which they disapproved, such as a union between an older widower and much younger woman, or the premature remarriage of a widow or widower. Villages also used charivari in cases of adulterous relationships, against wife-beaters or unmarried mothers. It was also used as a form of shaming upon husbands who were beaten by their wives and had not stood up for themselves. In some cases, the community disapproved of any remarriage by older widows or widowers. Charivari is the original French word, and in Canada it is used by both Anglophones and Francophones. Chivaree became the common variant in Ontario, Canada. In the United States, the term shivaree is more common.

As species of popular justice rites, charivaric events were carefully planned and often staged at times of traditional festivity, thereby blending justice and celebration.

== Etymology ==
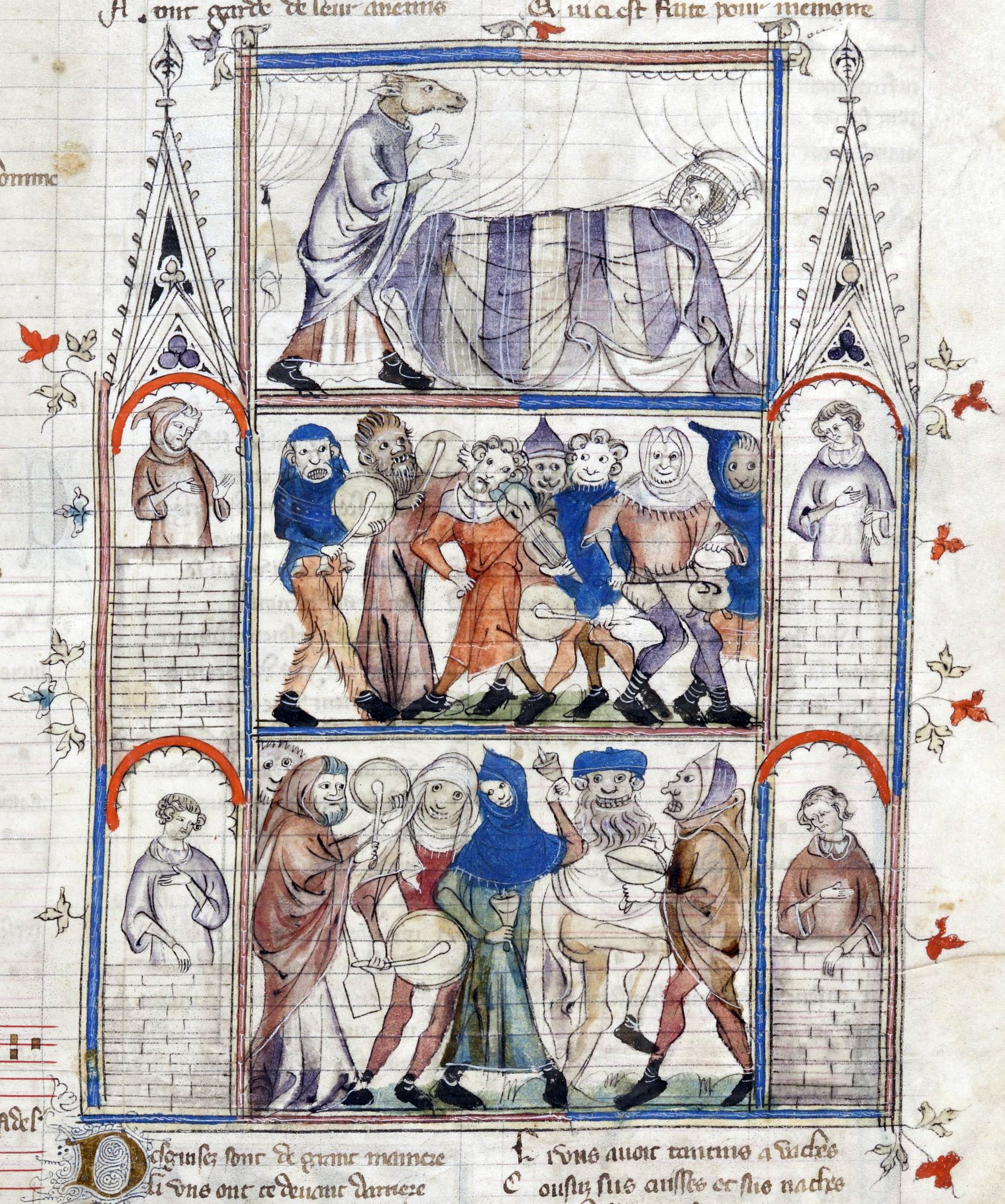
Depiction of charivari, early 14th century (from the Roman de Fauvel)

The origin of the word charivari is likely from the Vulgar Latin caribaria, plural of caribarium, already referring to the custom of rattling kitchenware with an iron rod, itself probably from the Greek καρηβαρία (karēbaría), literally "heaviness in the head" but also used to mean "headache", from κάρα "head" and βαρύς "heavy". In any case, the tradition has been practised for at least 700 years. A painting in the early 14th-century French manuscript Roman de Fauvel shows a charivari underway.

== Regional variations ==
=== England ===
So-called "rough music" practices in England were known by many regional or local designations. In the North the most commonly employed term was "stang riding", a stang being a long pole carried on the shoulders of two men between which an object or a person could be mounted. In the South, the term skimmington, or skimmington ride, was most commonly employed, a skimmington being a type of large wooden ladle with which an unruly wife might beat her husband. Other terms include "lewbelling", "tin-panning", "ran tanning", a "nominey" or "wooset". Where effigies of the "wrongdoers" were made they were frequently burned as the climax of the event (as the inscription on the Rampton photograph indicates) or "ritually drowned" (thrown into a pond or river).

The very essence of the practice was public humiliation of the victim under the eyes of their neighbours Rough music practices were irregularly scattered throughout English communities in the nineteenth century. In the twentieth they declined but endured in a few places, such as Rampton, Nottinghamshire (1909), Middleton Cheney (1909) and Blisworth (1920s and 1936), Northamptonshire. There were in fact some examples after the Second World War in Sussex, at West Hoathly in 1947 and Copthorne around 1951, and an attempt at traditional rough music practice was last documented by the folklorist Theo Brown in a Devonshire village around 1973.

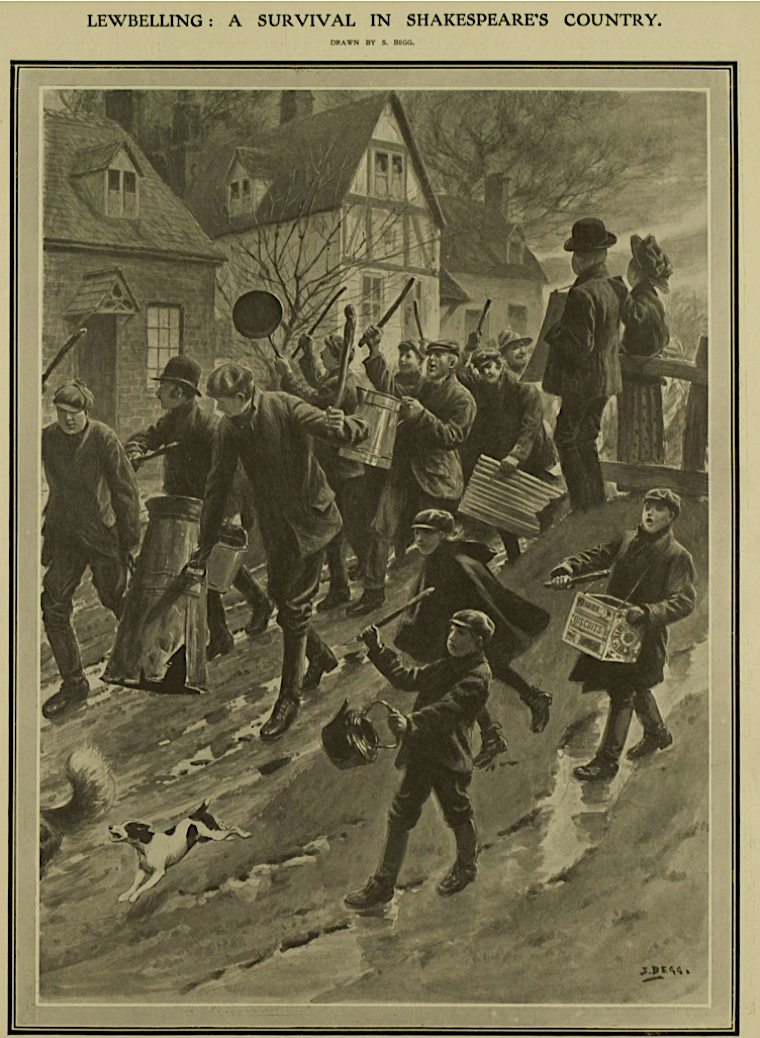
A lewbelling in Warwickshire, 1909. The caption stated that the custom, although dying out, was still occasionally observed. Here it was applied to an immoral couple.

In Warwickshire, the custom was known as "loo-belling" or "lewbelling", and in northern England as "riding the stang". Other names given to this or similar customs were "rough-musicking" and "hussitting" (said to be a reference to the Hussites or followers of John Huss).

Noisy, masked processions were held outside the home of the accused wrongdoer, involving the cacophonous rattling of bones and cleavers, the ringing of bells, hooting, blowing bull's horns, the banging of frying pans, saucepans, kettles, or other kitchen or barn implements with the intention of creating long-lasting embarrassment to the alleged perpetrator. During a rough music performance, the victim could be displayed upon a pole or donkey (in person or as an effigy), their "crimes" becoming the subject of mime, theatrical performances or recitatives, along with a litany of obscenities and insults. Alternatively, one of the participants would "ride the stang" (a pole carried between the shoulders of two or more men or youths) while banging an old kettle or pan with a stick and reciting a rhyme (called a "nominy") such as the following:

With a ran, tan, tan,
On my old tin can,
Mrs. _______ and her good man.
She bang'd him, she bang'd him,
For spending a penny when he stood in need.
She up with a three-footed stool;
She struck him so hard, and she cut so deep,
Till the blood run down like a new stuck sheep!

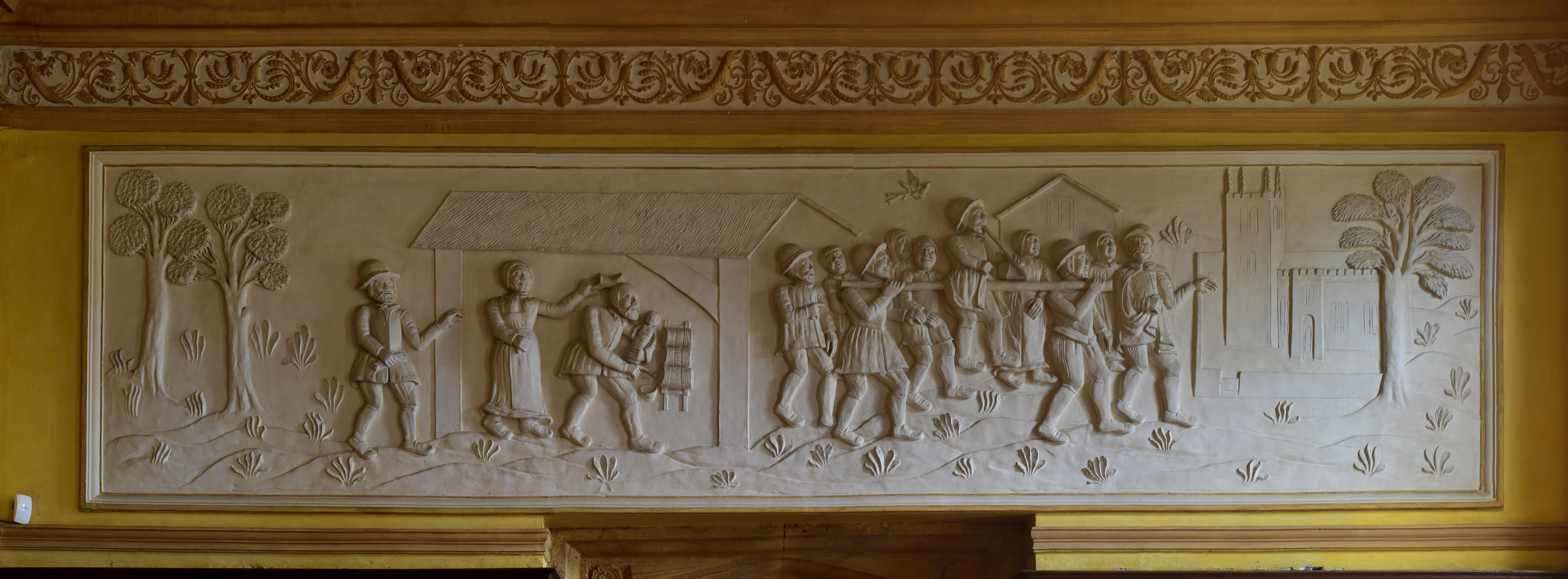
Skimmington Ride panel, Montacute House

Rough music processions are well attested in the medieval period as punishments for violations of the assumed gender norms. Men who had allowed themselves to be dominated by their shrewish wives were liable to be targeted and a frieze from Montacute House, an Elizabethan Manor in Somerset depicts just such an occurrence. However, in the nineteenth century the practice seems to have been somewhat refocused; whilst in the early period rough music was often used against men who had failed to assert their authority over their wives, by the end of the nineteenth century it was mostly targeted against men who had exceeded their authority by beating them. Thus, in contrast to the verses above referring to a shrewish wife there were also songs referring to the use of rough music as a protection for wives.

Rough music song originating from South Stoke, Oxfordshire:

There is a man in our town
Who often beats his wife,
So if he does it any more,
We'll put his nose right out before.
Holler boys, holler boys,
Make the bells ring,
Holler boys, holler boys.
God save the King.

The participants were generally young men temporarily bestowed with the power of rule over the everyday affairs of the community. As above, issues of sexuality and domestic hierarchy most often formed the pretexts for rough music, including acts of domestic violence or child abuse. However, rough music was also used as a sanction against those who committed certain species of economic crimes such as blocking footpaths, preventing traditional gleaning, or profiteering at times of poor harvests. Occupational groups, such as butchers, employed rough music against others in the same trade who refused to abide by the commonly agreed labour customs.

Rough music practices would often be repeated for three or up to seven nights in a row. Many victims fled their communities and cases of suicide are not unknown. As forms of vigilantism that were likely to lead to public disorder, ran-tanning and similar activities were banned under the Highways Act of 1882.

==== Origins, history and form ====
Skimmingtons are recorded in England in early medieval times and they are recorded in colonial America from around the 1730s. The term is particularly associated with the West Country region of England and, although the etymology is not certain, it has been suggested that it derived from the ladle used in that region for cheesemaking, which was perceived as a weapon used by a woman to beat a weak or henpecked husband. The rationale for a skimmington varied, but one major theme was disapproval of a man for weakness in his relationship with his wife. A description of the custom in 1856 cites three main targets: a man who is worsted by his wife in a quarrel; a cuckolded man who accepts his wife's adultery; and any married person who engages in licentious conduct. To "ride such a person skimmington" involved exposing them or their effigy to ridicule on a cart, or on the back of a horse or donkey. Some accounts describe the participants as carrying ladles and spoons with which to beat each other, at least in the case of skimmingtons prompted by marital discord. The noisy parade passed through the neighbourhood, and served as a punishment to the offender and a warning to others to abide by community norms; Roberts suggests that the homes of other potential victims were visited in a pointed manner during a skimmington. According to one citation, a skimmington was broken up by the police in a village in Dorset as late as 1917; and incidents have been reported from the 1930s, the 1950s and perhaps even the 1970s.

The antiquary and lexicographer Francis Grose described a skimmington as: "Saucepans, frying-pans, poker and tongs, marrow-bones and cleavers, bulls horns, etc. beaten upon and sounded in ludicrous processions" (A Classical Dictionary of the Vulgar Tongue, 1796).

==== Western Rising ====
During the Western Rising of 1628–1631, which was a rebellion in south-west England against the enclosure of royal forest lands, the name "Lady Skimmington" was adopted by the leader of the protest movement. According to some sources the name was used by a number of men involved with the Western Rising, who dressed in women's clothes not only as a method of disguise, but also in order to symbolise their protest against a breach of the established order.

==== Similar customs ====
Many folk customs around the world have involved making loud noises to scare away evil spirits.

Tuneless, cacophonous "rough music", played on horns, bugles, whistles, tin trays and frying pans, was a feature of the custom known as Teddy Rowe's Band. This had taken place annually, possibly for several centuries, in the early hours of the morning, to herald the start of Pack Monday Fair at Sherborne, Dorset, until it was banned by the police in 1964 because of hooliganism the previous year. The fair is still held, on the first Monday after Old Michaelmas Day (10 October) – St Michael's Day in the Old Style calendar.

The Tin Can Band at Broughton, Northamptonshire, a seasonal custom, takes place at midnight on the third Sunday in December. The participants march around the village for about an hour, rattling pans, dustbin lids, kettles and anything else that will make a noise. The council once attempted to stop the tin-canning; participants were summoned and fined, but a dance was organised to raise money to pay the fines and the custom continues. The village is sufficiently proud of its custom for it to feature on the village sign.

=== Mainland Europe ===
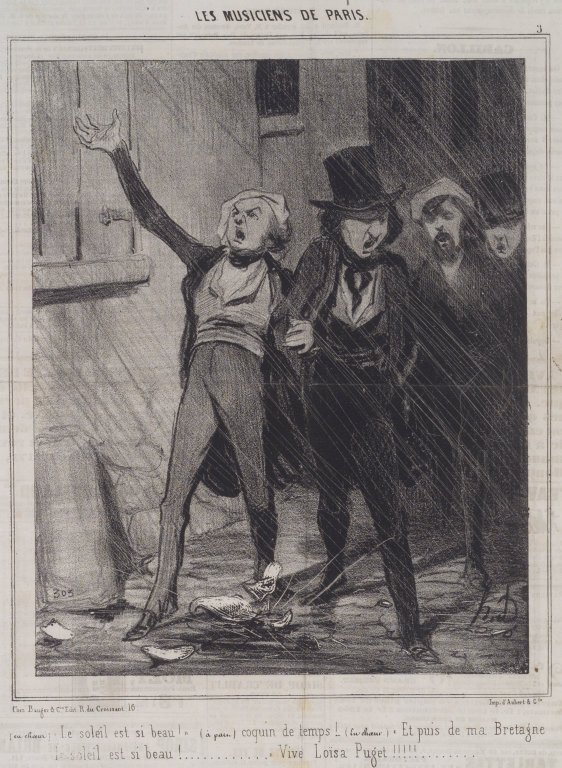
Paris men sing a drunken serenade in Honoré Daumier's series of humorous cartoons, The Musicians of Paris

Equivalents include the German: haberfeldtreiben and German: katzenmusik, Italian: scampanate, Spanish cacerolada, (also cacerolazo or cacerolada) and French: charivari.

The custom has been documented back to the Middle Ages but it is likely that it was traditional before that. It was first recorded in France, as a regular wedding activity to celebrate the nuptials at some point after the vows had been taken. But charivari achieved its greatest importance as it became transformed into a form of community censure against socially unacceptable marriages; for example, the marriage of widows before the end of the customary social period of formal mourning. In the early 17th century at the Council of Tours, the Catholic Church forbade the ritual of charivari and threatened its practitioners with excommunication. It did not want the community taking on the judgment and punishment of parishioners. But the custom continued in rural areas.

The charivari as celebration was a custom initially practised by the upper classes, but as time went on, the lower classes also participated and often looked forward to the next opportunity to join in. The two main purposes of the charivari in Europe were to facilitate change in the current social structure and to act as a form of censure within the community. The goal was to enforce social standards and to rid the community of socially unacceptable relationships that threatened the stability of the whole.

In Europe various types of charivari took place that differed from similar practices in other parts of the world. For example, the community might conduct a stag hunt against adulterers by creating a mock chase of human "stags" by human "hounds". The hounds would pursue the stags (that is, those who were committing the adulterous relationship) and dispense animal blood on their doorsteps. European charivaris were highly provocative, leading to overt public humiliation. The people used them to acknowledge and correct misbehaviour. In other parts of the world, similar public rituals around nuptials were practised mostly for celebration.

Humiliation was the most common consequence of the European charivari. The acts which victims endured were forms of social ostracism often so embarrassing that they would leave the community for places where they were not known. Sometimes the charivari resulted in murder or suicide. Examples from the south of France include five cases of a charivari victim's firing on his accusers: these incidents resulted in two people being blinded and three killed. Some victims committed suicide, unable to recover from the public humiliation and social exclusion.

Norman Lewis recorded the survival of the custom in 1950s Ibiza "in spite of the energetic disapproval of the Guardia Civil". It was called cencerrada, consisted of raucous nocturnal music, and was aimed at widows or widowers who remarried prematurely.

It is possible that the blowing of car horns after weddings in France (and indeed in many European countries) today is a holdover from the charivari of the past.

=== North America ===
Charivari has been practiced in much of the United States, but it was most frequent on the frontier, where communities were small and more formal enforcement was lacking. It was documented into the early 20th century, but was thought to have mostly died out by mid century. In Canada, charivaris have occurred in Ontario, Quebec, and the Atlantic provinces, but not always as an expression of disapproval.

The early French colonists took the custom of charivari to their settlements in Quebec. Some historians believe the custom spread to English-speaking areas of Lower Canada and eventually into the American South, but it was independently common in English society, so was likely to be part of Anglo-American customs. Charivari is well documented in the Hudson Valley from the earliest days of English settlers through the early 1900s. The earliest documented examples of Canadian charivari were in Quebec in the mid-17th century. One of the most notable was on June 28, 1683. After the widow of François Vézier dit Laverdure remarried only three weeks after her husband’s death, people of Quebec City conducted a loud and strident charivari against the newlyweds at their home.

As practised in North America, the charivari tended to be less extreme and punitive than the traditional European custom. Each was unique and heavily influenced by the standing of the family involved, as well as who was participating. While embellished with some European traditions, in a North American charivari participants might throw the culprits into horse tanks or force them to buy candy bars for the crowd.

All in fun – it was just a shiveree, you know, and nobody got mad about it. At least not very mad.

— Johnson (1990), p. 382.

This account from an American charivari in Kansas exemplifies the North American attitude. In contrast to punitive charivari in small villages in Europe, meant to ostracize and isolate the evildoers, North American charivaris were used as "unifying rituals", in which those in the wrong were brought back into the community after what might amount to a minor hazing. In some communities the ritual served as a gentle spoof of the newlyweds, intended to disrupt for a while any sexual activities that might be under way. In parts of the midwest US, such as Kansas, in the mid 1960–1970s, shivaree customs continued as good natured wedding humour along the lines of the musical Oklahoma!. Rituals included wheeling the bride about in a wheelbarrow or tying cowbells under a wedding bed. This ritual may be the base of the fastening of tin cans to the newlyweds car.

In Tampa, Florida, in September 1885, a large chivaree was held on the occasion of local official James T. Magbee's wedding. According to historian Kyle S. Vanlandingham, the party was "the wildest and noisiest of all the chivaree parties in Tampa's history," attended by "several hundred" men and lasting "until near daylight". The music produced during the chivaree was reportedly "hideous and unearthly beyond description".

Charivari is believed to have inspired the development of the Acadian tradition of Tintamarre.

== Importance of noise ==
The use of excessive noise was a universal practice in association with variations in the custom. Loud singing and chanting were common in Europe, including England, and throughout North America. For an 1860 English charivari against a wife-beater, someone wrote an original chant which the crowd was happy to adopt:

Has beat his wife!
Has beat his wife!
It is a very great shame and disgrace
To all who live in this place
It is indeed, upon my life!

In Europe the noise, songs, and chants had special meanings for the crowd. When directed against adulterers, the songs represented the community’s disgust. For a too-early remarriage of a widow or widower, the noises symbolized the scream of the late husband or wife in the night.

== Other usages ==
Perhaps the most common usage of the word today is in relation to circus performances, where a 'charivari' is a type of show opening that sees a raucous tumble of clowns and other performers into the playing space. This is the most common form of entrance used in today's classical circus, whereas the two- and three-ring circuses of the last century usually preferred a parade, or a 'spec'.

Charivari was sometimes called "riding the 'stang", when the target was a man who had been subject to scolding, beating, or other abuse from his wife. The man was made to "ride the 'stang", which meant that he was placed backwards on a horse, mule or ladder and paraded through town to be mocked, while people banged pots and pans.

The charivari was used to belittle those who could not or would not consummate their marriage. In the mid-16th century, historic records attest to a charivari against Martin Guerre in the small village of Artigat in the French Pyrenees for that reason. After he married at the age of 14, his wife did not get pregnant for eight years, so villagers ridiculed him. Later in his life, another man took over Guerre's identity and life. The trial against the impostor was what captured the events for history. In the 20th century, the events formed the basis of a French film, Le Retour de Martin Guerre (1982), and the history The Return of Martin Guerre by the American history professor Natalie Zemon Davis.

With the charivari widely practised among rural villagers across Europe, the term and practice were part of common culture. Over time, the word was applied to other items. In Bavaria, charivari was adopted as the name for the silver ornaments worn with Lederhosen; the items consist of small trophies from game, like teeth from wild boar, or deer, jaws and fangs from foxes and various marters, feathers and claws from jaybirds and birds of prey. A Bavarian Charivari resembles the so-called "chatelaine", a women's ornament consisting of a silver chain with numerous pendants like a mini silver box of needles, a small pair of scissors, a tiny bottle of perfume, etc.

In the Philippines, Charivari is punishable for being a public disorder under Article 155 of the Revised Penal Code.

== In music ==
Charivari would later be taken up by composers of the French Baroque tradition as a 'rustic' or 'pastoral' character piece. Notable examples are those of the renowned viola da gamba virtuoso Marin Marais in his five collections of pieces for the basse de viole and continuo. Some are quite advanced and difficult and subsequently evoke the title's origins.

The British period instrument/early music ensemble Charivari Agréable (founded in 1993) states that their name translates as "'pleasant tumult' (from Saint-Lambert’s 1707 treatise on accompaniment)".

== In art and literature ==
- In the 14th-century political satire Roman de Fauvel, the evil half-man, half-horse central character Fauvel marries the allegorical figure of Vainglory, and the townspeople hold a charivari in the street as he goes to his marriage bed.
- In Wallace Stegner's 1971 Pulitzer Prize-winning novel Angle of Repose, shortly after new bride Susan Burling Ward arrives in 1876 in the California mining town New Almaden, her husband learns with alarm that "[t]here was some talk about a charivari" among the miners, some of whom throw snickering glances at Susan.
- Québécois writer Robert Goulet's 1961 novel The Violent Season depicts a charivari that occurs in rural Quebec.
- The Late Lancashire Witches, a play by Thomas Heywood and Richard Brome, features a horseback skimmington ride prompted by a woman who seeks greater independence.
- In Samuel Butler's Hudibras, the central character encounters a skimmington in a scene notably illustrated by William Hogarth.
- A skimmington is depicted in a plaster frieze in Montacute House, which dates from the Elizabethan era, and shows a man mounted on a pole, carried on the shoulders of others.
- A skimmington forms a well-known scene in Thomas Hardy's 1884 novel The Mayor of Casterbridge. Effigies of the mayor and Lucetta, a former lover, are paraded through the streets on a donkey by a noisy crowd when rumours of their prior relationship surface. Lucetta, now respectably married to Henchard's rival Farfrae, collapses in distress and humiliation, miscarries her baby and dies.

"They are coming up Corn Street after all! They sit back to back!"

"What—two of 'em—are there two figures?"
"Yes. Two images on a donkey, back to back, their elbows tied to one another's! She's facing the head, and he's facing the tail."
"Is it meant for anybody in particular?"
"Well—it mid be. The man has got on a blue coat and kerseymere leggings; he has black whiskers, and a reddish face. 'Tis a stuffed figure, with a falseface." (...)

The numerous lights round the two effigies threw them up into lurid distinctness; it was impossible to mistake the pair for other than the intended victims.

"Come in, come in," implored Elizabeth; "and let me shut the window!"
"She's me—she's me—even to the parasol—my green parasol!" cried Lucetta with a wild laugh as she stepped in. She stood motionless for one second—then fell heavily to the floor.

— Thomas Hardy, The Mayor of Casterbridge

- The Skimmity Hitchers are a Scrumpy and Western band from the West Country of England. They took their name from the Skimmington (known as Skimmity in Dorset) to reflect their music and stage show, which is a mix of rough music, parody, drunkenness and audience humiliation.

== In popular culture ==
- Le Charivari was a French satirical magazine first published in 1832. Its British counterpart, established in 1841, was entitled Punch, or The London Charivari.
- In the film The Purchase Price, members of a North Dakota farming community celebrate the marriage of Barbara Stanwyck's and George Brent's characters by holding a noisy, drunken shivaree a couple days after their nuptials.
- In the television show The Waltons, the episode titled "The Shivaree" focused on a wedding between a city boy and a country girl. The groom almost calls off the marriage after being humiliated by a shivaree thrown by his wife's family and friends.
- In the television show The Rifleman, in the episode titled "Shivaree", two travelers are forced to get married when it is discovered that they are actually a young unmarried couple in disguise.
- The Midsomer Murders television episode "Four Funerals and a Wedding" prominently features a Skimmington ride.
- In the fantasy novel series Discworld, Terry Pratchett refers to the 'dissonant piping and war-drums of vengeance' sounds of rough music in a scene where a rural town finds out that a local man beat his daughter, causing her miscarriage, and a drunken mob come to kill him for the crime.
- In the television show Dr. Quinn, Medicine Woman, the episode titled "Return Engagement, Part 1" references a shivaree after an ex-prostitute marries the telegraph operator.
- In the musical Oklahoma!, Laurey and Curly are given a (lighthearted) shivaree on their wedding night by a group of rowdy cowboys near the end of Act II.
- In the British drama series Jamestown, season 2, episode 8, the Widow Castell is made to walk a Skimmington in order to shame her for not remarrying soon enough. The men in power want her under the control of a husband to stymie her meddling in colony politics.
- In the 1950 film Never A Dull Moment, newlyweds Chris and Kay are given a shivaree by local ranchers on Kay’s first night at her husband’s ranch.
- In the American animated sitcom Archer, season 5, episode 12, titled "Filibuster", Cyril proposes that the servants conduct a shivaree while he and Julia Calderon consummate their marriage. She declines.
- In the 1966 film El Dorado, Cole Thorton (John Wayne) tells Mississippi (James Caan) that they were unable to re-enter the saloon they just left because the "shivaree" (i.e., the fight they had with other bar patrons) "wore out our welcome".
- In the television show Death Valley Days, season 1, episode 8, "The Chivaree", the couple getting married discuss the expected "chivareeing" to follow their upcoming wedding. The groom opposes, after having already been chided in the town previously, but the scorned ex-lover of the bride insists. The bride and groom sit quietly in the window and endure the ruckus for two days before inviting the crowd in for food and drink.
- In the TV series Game of Thrones, Cersei Lannister's hair is cut off and she is paraded naked through the streets of King's Landing, whilst a bell is rung to repeated chants of "Shame!"
- ' Burning Ash ': (1992) - Charlie Drake short film about a neighbourhood dispute, which, in the end credits, cites 1959, not 1951, as the last time the practise at that time had occurred for the same reason.

== See also ==
- Cacerolazo
- Cancel culture
- Dorset Ooser
- Escrache
- Extrajudicial punishment
- Mobbing
- Riding a rail
- Tarring and feathering
- The Rogue's March
