= Samuel J. Hamrick =

American novelist

Samuel J. Hamrick (1929–2008) was an American spy novelist, who often used the pen name W. T. Tyler. Some of his novels include Rogue's March, The Ants of God, The Consul's Wife, and Last Train from Berlin.

Hamrick served as an U.S. diplomat, assigned to Lebanon, Canada, the Democratic Republic of Congo, Ethiopia and Somalia from 1960 to 1980.

Hamrick also wrote a nonfiction book, Deceiving the Deceivers:Kim Philby, Donald Maclean and Guy Burgess, in which he speculated that Kim Philby and other defectors were unknowingly helping Great Britain dupe the Soviet Union, rather than successfully spying for the Soviet Union.

== Sources ==
- Lavietes, Stuart (10 March 2008). "Samuel J. Hamrick, Who Wrote as W. T. Tyler, Dies at 78". New York Times.
- Holley, Joe (10 March 2008). "Samuel Hamrick Jr.; Diplomat Wrote Popular Spy Novels". Washington Post.
