= Edward Ward =

Ted, Ned, Ed, Eddie or Edward Ward may refer to:

== Noblemen and public officials ==
- Sir Edward Ward, 1st Baronet, of Bixley (c.1618–1684), English Sheriff of Norfolk
- Edward Ward, 7th Baron Dudley (1631–1701), English peer
- Edward Ward, 8th Baron Dudley (1683–1704), English peer
- Edward Ward, 9th Baron Dudley (1704–1731), English peer
- Edward Ward (politician) (1753–1812), Irish MP for Bangor and Down
- Edward Ward (businessman) (before 1775–1837), American legislator from Tennessee
- Edward Michael Ward (1789–1832), British envoy to Portugal, Russia and Saxony
- Edward Wolstenholme Ward (1823–1890), British general, legislator and administrator in New South Wales
- Edward Ward, 4th Viscount Bangor (1827–1881), Irish representative peer
- Sir Edward Ward, 1st Baronet, of Wilbraham Place (1853–1928), British colonel, reformer of army administration
- Eddie Ward (1899–1963), Australian politician
- Edward Ward, 7th Viscount Bangor (1905–1993), Anglo-Irish war correspondent and author

== Sportsmen ==
- Edward Ward (cricketer) (1847–1940), English right-handed batsman and clergyman
- Edward Ward (footballer) (1895–1971), English inside forward
- Edward Ward (umpire) (1896–1966), Barbadian cricketer
- Ted Ward (c.1916–1988), Welsh rugby league footballer and coach
- Ed Ward (ice hockey) (born 1969), Canadian right wing

== Others ==
- Edward Ward (judge) (1638–1714), English lawyer
- Ned Ward (1667–1731), English satirical writer
- Edward Matthew Ward (1816–1879), English Victorian narrative painter
- Edward Ward (composer) (1900–1971), American nominated for seven Oscars between 1939 and 1944

== See also ==
- Ed Ward (disambiguation)
- Edmund Ward (disambiguation)
- Edwin Ward (1919–2005), English priest
