= John Horsey =

John Horsey may refer to:

- John Horsey (MP died 1422), MP for Dorset (UK Parliament constituency)
- John Horsey (died 1546), English knight
- John Horsey (died 1564), English knight, son of the above
- John Horsey (died 1827), English nonconformist minister and tutor
