= A Bearded Man =

Study by Peter Paul Rubens

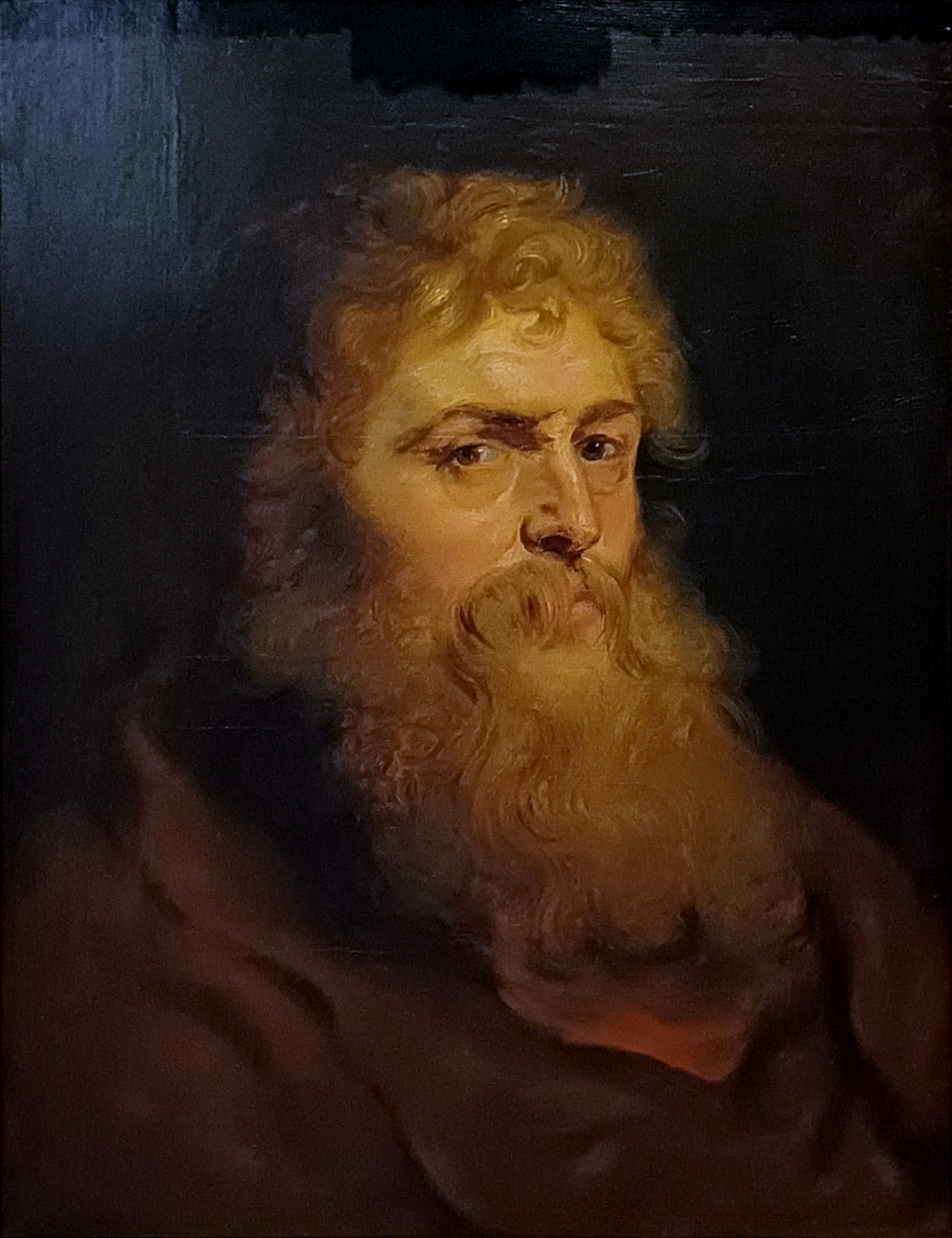
A Bearded Man (c. 1617–1618) by Rubens

A Bearded Man is a study by Peter Paul Rubens, now held in the Museo Soumaya in Mexico City.

== History ==
It was attributed to Rubens by Max Friedländer, Wilhelm Valentiner Julius S. Held and Michael Jaffé, who date it to between 1617 and 1618 from indications that it was produced in his Wapper studio-house in Antwerp.

At that time Rubens' only assistant was Anthony van Dyck.
