= Ed Ward =

Ed Ward may refer to:

- Ed Ward (ice hockey) (born 1969), Canadian retired National Hockey League player
- Ed Ward (writer) (1948–2021), American writer and radio commentator

== See also ==
- Edward Ward (disambiguation)
- Edmund Ward (disambiguation)
- Edwin Ward (1919–2005), English priest
