= Jack Chute =

John Chaloner (Jack) Chute (born Basingstoke 4 October 1881; died Buckland Newton 12 September 1961) was Archdeacon of Sherborne from 1941 until his death.

He was educated at Eton, Balliol and Cuddesdon. After his ordination, he was Assistant Chaplain at his old school. Following 25 years at Eton he was Rector of Piddlehinton from 1938 to 1957.

He died at Buckland Newton on 12 September 1961 at the age of 79.

Church of England titles
Preceded by Albert Ernest Joscelyne	Archdeacon of Sherborne; 1941–1961	Succeeded by David Rokeby Maddock
