= Sherborne Abbey =

Church in Dorset, England

Coordinates: 50°56′48″N 2°31′0″W

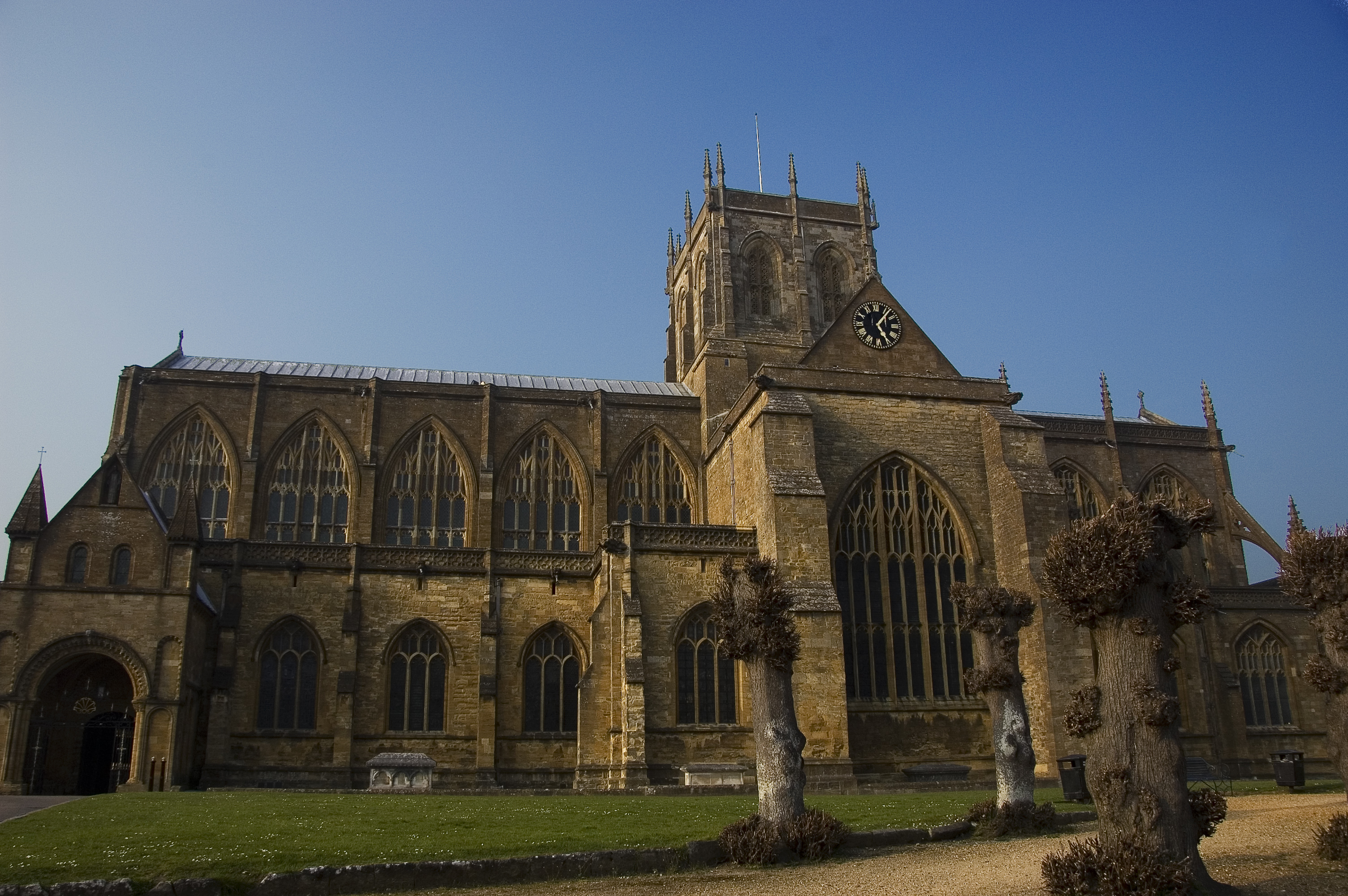
- Sherborne Abbey
- Sherborne Abbey
- OS grid reference: ST 63792 16489
- Country: England
- Denomination: Church of England
- Previous denomination: Roman Catholic
- Churchmanship: Central/Catholic
- Website: www.sherborneabbey.com

History
- Founded: 705
- Founder: St Aldhelm
- Dedication: St Mary the Virgin

Architecture
- Style: Saxon, Norman, Perpendicular
- Years built: 705, c. 1050, c. 1130–80, c. 1380–1500

Specifications
- Length: 240ft (73m)

Administration
- Province: Canterbury
- Diocese: Salisbury
- Archdeaconry: Sherborne
- Deanery: Sherborne
- Benefice: Sherborne w Castleton, Lillington and Longburton
- Parish: Sherborne with Castleton

Clergy
- Bishop: Karen Gorham
- Rector: Martin Lee
- Vicar: James Edie

Coat of arms of Sherborne Abbey

Sherborne Abbey, otherwise the Abbey Church of St. Mary the Virgin, is a Church of England church in Sherborne in the English county of Dorset. It was formerly a Saxon Catholic cathedral (705–1075) and a Benedictine abbey church (998–1539), before becoming a Church of England parish church in 1539 during the dissolution of the monasteries. In England's Thousand Best Churches (1999) by Simon Jenkins, it is one of only 18 churches given a five-star rating.

== History ==
This site has been occupied since Roman times. During the restoration of 1849–58, excavations were carried out in which part of a Roman mosaic pavement was found deep beneath the floor, as well as evidence that the Saxon cathedral of AD 705 had been built on the site of a previous church.

It is possible that there was a Celtic Christian church called Lanprobi here as early as AD 658, when it was part of the Celtic kingdom of Dumnonia, and Kenwalc or Cenwalh, King of the West Saxons, is believed to be one of its founders. However, it is probable that this church was actually on the site of modern-day Castleton Church.

=== Cathedral (705–1075) and abbey (998–1539) ===
The Saxon Diocese of Sherborne was founded in 705 by King Ine of Wessex to relieve pressure from the growing see of Winchester. He set Aldhelm as first bishop of the see of Western Wessex, covering Dorset, Somerset, Devon, with his seat at Sherborne. Aldhelm was the first of 27 bishops of Sherborne. Cornwall was added to the diocese at the end of the ninth century, but in 909 the diocese was divided in three to create the new bishoprics of Wells, covering Somerset, and Crediton, covering Devon and Cornwall, leaving Sherborne with Dorset.

The twentieth bishop was Wulfsige III (or St. Wulfsin). In 998 he established a Benedictine abbey at Sherborne and became its first abbot. In 1058, the Sherborne chapter elected Herman, Bishop of Ramsbury, to be also Bishop of Sherborne. In 1075, Herman unified his two bishoprics into a single see with its seat at Old Sarum, so Sherborne remained an abbey church but was no longer a cathedral. The bishop (in Old Sarum) remained the nominal head of the abbey until 1122, when Roger de Caen, Bishop of Salisbury, made the abbey independent.

From 1122 until dissolution, Horton Priory (founded as a Benedictine abbey in 961, but reduced to priory status when the bishopric moved) was dependent on Sherborne. Also, Kidwelly Priory (later abbey) in Wales was made a cell of Sherborne Abbey, which was at that time a cathedral priory, c.1110 and was dissolved at the same time as its mother-house.

=== Parish church ===
The Benedictine foundation at Sherborne ended in the dissolution of the monasteries in 1539, when the abbey was surrendered to King Henry VIII. Various properties at Sherborne were bought from the king by Sir John Horsey, who then sold the abbey to the people of Sherborne, who bought the building to be their parish church (as people of many other places did), which it still is. The original parish church alongside the abbey was demolished, although the foundations are still visible. In 1550, King Edward VI issued a new charter to the school that had existed at Sherborne since 705, and some of the remaining abbey buildings were turned over to it.

== Architecture ==
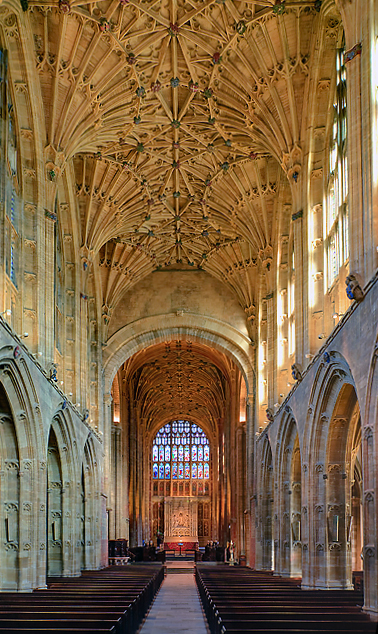
The nave and chancel looking east

The abbey is a Grade I listed building. It has several distinct architectural styles throughout. Like much of Sherborne's historic centre, it is built of honey-brown hamstone.

=== Saxon ===
When St Aldhelm built his cathedral (starting after about 705, and prior to his deathin 709), it was to the west of the current building – the west wall of the current church is the site of the east wall of St Aldhelm's. In c.1050 Bishop Ælfwold II built a new cathedral and abbey church on the current site that was, apparently, one of the largest in England. Of this, the known surviving parts are the west wall and the core of the columns supporting the two westernmost arches. At the west end of the north aisle, a Saxon doorway from c.1050 survives. This would have led into a large porch flanking a west tower as was conventional with Saxon church-architecture. Roger of Caen rebuilt much of Ælfwold II's church c.1130, replacing it with a much larger Norman-style church on the same site, completed c.1180. This is the reason why the nave is shorter (only five bays) than the typical Anglo-Norman church nave.

=== Norman ===
Most of the walls of the crossing, the north and south transepts, and the outer walls of the nave aisles date from c.1140. The walls of the Wykeham Chapel, and some of the wall of the north quire aisle were also built at this time. The entrance porch dates from c.1180, though the upper story was restored in 1851. The Norman choir stalls extended west of the central tower (as was then usually the case) and this can be seen in the stonework of the east and west tower arches were the shafts stop short of the floor to allow space for the stall-work. The area of the nave west of the Norman quire was used as the parish church until the building of All Hallows' Church later on.

=== Early English ===
The outer walls of Bishop Roger's Chapel (now the choir vestry) as well as the remains of the old Lady Chapel date from this period, c.1240.

=== Decorated ===
In the mid-14th century St Aldhelm's church was pulled down and in c.1360 a new chapel-of-ease was built, dedicated All Hallows. This church was demolished c.1542, but the arches of the old nave can be seen projecting out, and the wall of the old north aisle remains intact.

=== Perpendicular ===
From c.1380 to 1500 the abbey was greatly rebuilt. In the late 14th century the chapels of St Katherine and St Sepulchre were built. The former was altered in the 15th century and contains examples of early Renaissance classicism architecture. The rebuilding was started by Abbot Robert Brunyng. The quire was almost entirely rebuilt from 1425 and was completed (including the vaulting) around 1430. In the late 15th century much of the old stonework in the nave was covered over in stonework of this style (hence their substantial thickness) and the two easternmost arch pillars were rebuilt. The fan-vaulting in the nave, by William Smyth, was finished around 1490. In his praise of the ceiling, Jenkins says: "I would pit Sherborne's roof against any contemporary work of the Italian Renaissance." A consequence of having the new Perpendicular clerestory sit atop the old Norman pillars is that the two do not line up. However, this is not really noticeable from the outside.

In 1437, during this renovation, a riot in the town caused a fire that damaged much of the work. The heat brought out the iron in the stone, resulting in pink seen today. The outline of the medieval pulpitum can be seen where the pink stops in a vertical line at the east end of the nave. The fire and its effects also caused the design of the nave to be altered.

A section of a 15th-century wooden screen from the abbey is now located at the church in Sandford Orcas, Dorset.

=== Restoration ===
The abbey was heavily restored by the Victorian architect R.C. Carpenter in 1850, who added the two lower rows of lights in the west window, and the "somewhat fanciful" neo-Norman upper storey of the porch, which formerly had 15th-century windows.

== Lady Chapel ==
The Lady Chapel is on the site of two earlier chapels: the c.1250 then Lady Chapel and the c.15 Chapel of St. Mary le Bow. These were taken over by the governors of the newly founded 'Edward VI Grammar School' (now known as Sherborne School) in 1550 and were partially demolished and converted into a dwelling for the headmaster in 1560. It remained in use by the school until 1921 when plans were drawn for the grafting of a new Gothic-style Lady Chapel onto the remaining section of the medieval chapel and was completed in 1934. The original Lady Chapel was built slightly south of the centre of the church, so the 15th century vaulting in the ambulatory does not align with the arch into the chapel. The remaining section of St. Mary le Bow's Chapel contains a fireplace mantel from when it was a domestic dwelling.

The Lady Chapel contains the oldest candelabrum in England, dating from 1657, and probably came from the Netherlands. It is brass with a double-headed eagle at the top, and two tiers of branches and a globe beneath. The globe is inscribed recording the gift of Sherborne grandee, Mary Whetcumbe, with a shield-of-arms. Originally, it hung in the presbytery, but it fell during the Second World War. In 1962 it was restored and rehung in the Lady Chapel.

== Almshouses ==
=== St Thomas' Hospital ===
The first almshouse at Sherborne, the Hospital of St. Thomas Becket (or St Thomas-a-Becket's Chapel), existed in 1228, though its foundation date is not known. It was probably a royal foundation and was situated on the site of what is now 'The Old Green', formerly 'The Angel Inn'. In the early 16th century it was still standing but disused and by 1547 it had been pulled down.

==== Wardens of the St. Thomas' Hospital ====
1395 John de Wendelyngburgh (died in the same year)

1395 Nicholas Slake

1405 John Brunyng (later Abbot of Sherborne)

1540 John Horsey (purchased along with the abbey after the reformation)

=== St Julian's Hospice ===
The Hospice of St Julian, possibly named after St. Julian of Norwich, was founded on the east side of The Green in c1405 (along with the 'George Inne'). It was given towards the endowment of the St Johns' Almshouse in 1437 and remains in their ownership today. The George Inn was rebuilt in the 16th century, but the hospice and passageway are largely original. It is now used as a shop.

=== St Johns' Almshouse ===
In 1406, William Dodill chartered a new almshouse situated in Hound Street. However, by the 1430s larger and better premises were needed, so a new Sherborne almshouse was started by the old trustees of Dodill's almshouse. In 1436/7 a Royal charter was issued by King Henry VI to the Foundation, and this became the first fully licensed corporation in Sherborne.

The site of this new almshouse – St Johns' Almshouse, or fully, "The Hospital of St. John the Baptist and St. John the Evangelist" – is the south west corner of the Abbey Close, probably on the site of an earlier hospital of St Augustine. The building was completed in 1448, consisting of a chapel (1442), ante-chapel with a door onto Trendle street, a dining hall, and dormitories above. It is the best surviving example of a medieval almshouse in Wessex. In 1858 some cottages in the Abbey Close were purchased and demolished so that the premises could be enlarged. In 1866 the east wing was built to create additional dormitories and a room with an oriel window called the board-room, together with other improvements.

In the 15th century, the abbey already had an almshouse situated at Castleton (demolished in the 18th century), so it is likely that this building was for All Hallows Church (c.1360), not the abbey. Also, it is unusual for an almshouse to be so close to its respective church, and a possible reason may be that it was symbolic of the parishioners' growing resentment towards the monks for restricting their use of the abbey. However, this idea is difficult to substantiate.

==== Masters of the almshouse ====
1448 John Deen

1454 William Smyth

1468 Henry Borman

== Monastic buildings ==
Some of the monastic buildings were demolished following the Reformation in 1539. Most of those that remained are now incorporated into the Sherborne School buildings.

=== Cloisters ===
The principal buildings of a Benedictine abbey were always grouped around the cloister garth. They are usually built to the south of their respective abbey, but at Sherborne they were built to the north, probably for easier access to water from the Coombe Stream.

Sherborne's cloisters were built by Abbot Frith (1348–1373) and this is where the monks took their exercise, walking around the square arcade, in silence, with their hands buried in the long sleeves of their black habits.

The remains of the 14th-century pilasters against the south and west walls of the cloisters remain from which the ribs of the vaulted roof once sprang. On each side of the cloister were eight bays with six windows looking into the garth.

Some time around 1553 the cloisters were pulled down and in 1569 two large buttresses were built to support the abbey (one on the west wall of the north transept, the other on the north wall of the north aisle) and were built using stone from the old castle.

=== Conduit ===
In the 12th century the monks built an open stone conduit or channel to bring clean water from the spring at New Well (Newell) to the cloister so that they could wash their hands and faces before going to the Refectory for their meals. A conduit house was built c.1520 by Abbot Meere (1505–1535) over the fountain. This hexagonal structure stood against the north alley of the cloister, opposite the entrance to the monks' refectory, and had several spouts to enable a number of monks to wash at once. In 1553 the conduit house and water supply were moved to the market place at the bottom of Cheap Street.

=== Slype ===
Owned by Sherborne School since 1550, the slype is a lean-to building against the north transept. It is all that remains of the former south bay of the monks' dormitory. Originally it led from the cloister to the infirmary and monks' graveyard. It was probably also used in part as a mortuary. The western door was blocked by a buttress built in 1569. It contains 12th-century arcading and 13th-century engrafted arch and vaulting.

=== Chapter house ===
On the ground floor of the east side of the cloister stood the chapter house. Built in the late 12th–13th century, it was used as a daily meeting chamber for the monks. It was demolished c.1557/8.

Archaeological excavations between 1972 and 1976 revealed the east cloister range and the chapter house, the remains of which are now stored in the Sherborne School Archives.

=== Monks' dormitory ===
On the first floor of the east side of the cloister stood the monks' dormitory (late 12th century), adjoining the abbey for the convenience of attending night services in the abbey. By 1554 all that remained of the dormitory was just one bay (see 'the slype'). The pitch of the old roof is clearly marked on the face of the north wall of the north transept.

The monastery library and scriptorium were probably also on this floor.

=== Guesten hall ===
This was in the west cloister range of the monastery. The ground floor was the cellarer's store room and outer parlour. Originally it had no windows but facsimiles of windows in Boxgrove Abbey were added. On the first floor was the guesten hall (13th century with 15th-century roof and windows). The three roof bays to the north are not as ornate as the remaining six, which suggests that, at a time, the room may have been either divided into two by partition, or there could have been a gallery – possibly a minstrel gallery or perhaps to separate different classes of guest.

In the south wall are the remains of the east face of the west wall of the Saxon Abbey (10th- or 11th-century plinth, with 13th-century work on top). Behind this is a late 14th-century stone spiral staircase that originally led to the abbot's private chapel on the upper floor of the south cloister range.

An archaeological dig in 1967 revealed a pottery kiln built into the west wall, and from 1740 the main body of the building was used as a silk mill.

It is now used as the Sherborne School Library building.

Note: There is no definite evidence that this room was used as a 'guesten hall', though in Benedictine monasteries it was not unusual to have a room such as this above a cellarium on the west side of the cloisters. Others have suggested that it may have been a misericorde (the room in which some monastic rules were relaxed, especially fasting) where more substantial food was supplied than in the refectory. A room such as this might have had a buttery, which can explain the less ornate section of roof. It has also been suggested that it could have been a domus conversorum ('house of the converts'. Until 1280, people who converted from Judaism to Christianity forfeited their possessions to the Crown), but there is little to suggest that that such members were ever numerous enough to justify such a large room, nor are there any traces of separate cells.

=== Abbot's private chapel ===
On the first floor, to the west of the south cloister side stood the abbot's private chapel. It was accessed by an extant late 14th century stone spiral staircase, which also led to the guesten hall. The blocked doorway can still be seen in the outside east wall of the building.

The piscina (a perforated stone basin near the altar for carrying away holy water after it has been used in rinsing the chalice) can still be seen on the north aisle wall of the abbey.

=== Abbot's hall ===
This room, including the roof, dates from the early 15th century, but the windows are modern. It is mentioned in 1436 when Bishop Neville made an enquiry into the well-known quarrel between the monks and the townspeople.

The 12th-century undercroft would have been used by the monks as the cellars, a malthouse, or for storage.

It is now used as the Sherborne School Chapel. It has been much extended and bears little resemblance to it its original size.

=== Abbot's lodgings and monks' kitchen ===
On the north side of the cloisters stood the abbot's lodging and monk's kitchen, built c.1480 by Abbot Ramsam (1475–1504). The large chimney stack of the kitchen remains, and on the north wall there are panels carved with the symbols of the Evangelists.

The abbot's northern entrance would have been to the right of the projecting octagonal block, or stair turret, which led to the abbot's parlour above. On the roof are some fine gargoyles like those on the abbey.

=== Refectory ===
The refectory stood on the north side of the cloisters, filling in the space between the abbot's Hall and the monks' dormitory to make a quadrangle, and was where the monks ate their meals. Access from the ground floor was opposite the conduit house, and there was most likely access into the kitchen. The refectory may have been built at the same time as the dormitory, late C12, and it was demolished at the same time, in 1554. The stones from the refectory are thought to have been used to build the original 'scholehouse' for the king's school which had been given a royal charter only four years earlier.

== All Hallows' Church ==
The nave of the abbey, west of the Norman quire, was for many years used as the parish church, while the monks kept the crossing and east end of the church for their own use. However, in the 14th century, a large church dedicated to All Saints, or more commonly known as 'Alhalowes', was built at the west end of the Abbey Church as a chapel-of-ease for the townsfolk. The west porch and west tower were pulled down to the floor-level of the new church (which was about two feet above the level of the Abbey Church floor) and the new church was constructed on the site of the old St Aldhelm cathedral, completed c.1360.

This church had a nave flanked by an aisle either side, each six bays long. There was a small chapel at the north and south sides (respectively) of the east end. At this time, there was no west door into the abbey (inserted 1543) and the easternmost bay acted as an ambulatory for the abbey. The remaining five bays were used for worship in All Hallows. From old Parish Accounts, we learn that there was a tower at the north west corner, with a ring of bells, and there is also reference to an organ.

In 1450 Bishop Beauchamp confirmed that the status of All Hallows should rise from chapel-of-ease to that of parish church. In c.1542 the church was demolished, following the dissolution of the abbey in 1539, as St. Mary's became the parish church of Sherborne. The remains of the All Hallows font are now in the St. Mary le Bow Chapel, and most of the bells were transferred to the abbey tower.

== 1437 riot ==
By 1437 all parish services were held in All Hallows' Church. The exception being baptisms which were conducted at the font in the abbey nave because All Hallows, being a chapel-of-ease, was not legally entitled to a font of its own. This continued until the monks, during their reconstruction of the abbey, moved the font from its usual position in the nave, and narrowed the doorway giving access to the nave from All Hallows hindering the baptismal processions. In response to this, the townspeople built their own font in All Hallows.

Once learning of this, Abbot Bradford complained to Bishop Neville that the parishioners had built an illegal font in All Hallows, and the monks were also complaining that the parishioners were ringing the All Hallows' bells very early in the morning disturbing their sleep after their long night offices. Tensions continued to increase and there were more confrontations between the monks and parishioners in 1436.

Robert Neville, Bishop of Salisbury, held an inquiry soon after in an attempt to reconcile the dispute, ultimately taking the side of the parishioners – the monks had arbitrarily disrupted their baptismal processions by moving the font and obstructing the door to the nave.

Six weeks after the hearing Bishop Neville ordered the illegal font in All Hallows to be destroyed and removed, and the bells of All Hallows not to ring before 6 a.m., except on the four great feasts of the year. He ordered the monks to move the abbey font back to its ancient position and to widen the door they had narrowed. Finally, the monks were to build a wall or partition at the expense of the monastery, so that there should be a distinct separation between the monks and parishioners. He gave the monks until the following Christmas (almost a year) to carry out these orders. However, the orders were never carried out except for the building of the partition – a large stone pulpitum, 18 feet high and 5 feet wide, on the west side of the crossing, removed during the 1850s restoration.

The dispute simmered through the spring and summer of 1437, and boiled over after the Abbot sent a 'stout butcher' to smash the new All Hallows font. Infuriated by the destruction of the new font, the townspeople retaliated, and on the night of 28 October 1437 one of their priests, Richard Vowells, fired an arrow with a burning tip into the temporary thatch roof of the new quire, causing a huge fire from the burning roof and wooden scaffolding and much damage to the new construction, even melting the tower's lead roof and the bells. The heat brought out the iron in the stone, resulting in it being permanently reddened. The fire seems to have been contained only to the quire and tower; the nave and lady chapel were not significantly affected. In the end, the Pope was needed to settle the conflict and the townspeople were forced to contribute to the repairs of St. Mary's Church which they had destroyed.

After this, All Hallows Chapel became the parish church and even when St. Mary's was finally rebuilt, the parishioners continued to use All Hallows as their parish church until the abbey's dissolution in 1539.

== Military colours ==
The north nave aisle, sometimes called the 'Trinitie' or 'dark' aisle (as it was overshadowed by the adjoining cloisters), contains several colours from the 2nd Battalion Dorsetshire Regiment and the Dorsetshire Militia. The south nave aisle contains colours of the 1st Battalion Dorsetshire Regiment.

== Memorials and tombs ==
The north choir aisle contains two tombs, believed to be the tombs of King Æthelbald of Wessex and his brother King Ethelbert of Wessex, elder brothers to Alfred the Great.

Inside the Wykeham chapel is the tomb of Sir John Horsey and his son. Horsey had bought the church after the Dissolution of the Monasteries and sold it to the townspeople. Also in the chapel is the plainly marked tomb of the poet Sir Thomas Wyatt.

The south transept contains an impressive baroque memorial to John Digby, 3rd Earl of Bristol, made of marble and designed by John Nost. Additionally there is a memorial to Robert and Mary Digby.

St Katherine's Chapel contains the 16th-century tomb of John Leweston and wife Joan. The chapel was where Sir Walter Raleigh and Lady Raleigh attended services.

The north aisle contains a memorial to Abbot Clement (1163) and an effigy to an unknown prior, while the south aisle contains an effigy of Abbot Lawrence of Bradford (1246).

The Digby Memorial, situated outside the abbey, is a memorial to George Digby who provided a lot of funding for renovation work during the 19th century. It was built in 1884 and features statues of St Aldhelm, Bishop Roger of Salisbury (Roger de Caen), Abbot Bradford and Sir Walter Raleigh.

=== Burials ===
- Æthelbald, King of Wessex
- Æthelberht, King of Wessex
- Thomas Wyatt (poet)
- John Horsey (died 1546)
- John Horsey (died 1564)
- John Leweston
- John Digby, 3rd Earl of Bristol
- William Digby, 5th Baron Digby

== Reredos ==
The abbey has two reredos. The more recent is in the Lady Chapel, and was designed by Laurence Whistler in 1969, and fashioned in glass. The second, more substantial reredos was installed in 1858 and designed by RH Carpenter.

== Windows ==
The abbey contains a number of stained glass windows. The diarist Richard Symonds, post 1664–1665, described the location, blazon and surname for coats of arms of some leading families of Dorset displayed on stained glass in the Sherborne church as he observed them during the marches of the Royal Army during the English Civil War.

The south transept's Te Deum window was designed by Pugin in the early 19th century.

The great east window was designed by Clayton and Bell and installed in 1856–58. It features the Apostles Mark, Luke, Matthew and John, and Saints Sidwell and Juthware (Juthwara), who is featured in the Sherborne Missal. The glass in the southern aisle commemorates Sherborne School For Girls' 1949 jubilee.

The Lady Chapel glass comes from the 1930s, and depicts St Aldhelm presenting a model of his church to the patron.

The great west window is the newest of the major windows designed and made by John Hayward (1929–2007), being installed in 1997 to replace a poor quality, faded, Pugin-conceived glass. The new glass depicts the patron and the baby Jesus, the Biblical Magi and the shepherds, the Genesis story, the fall of man and the Easter story.

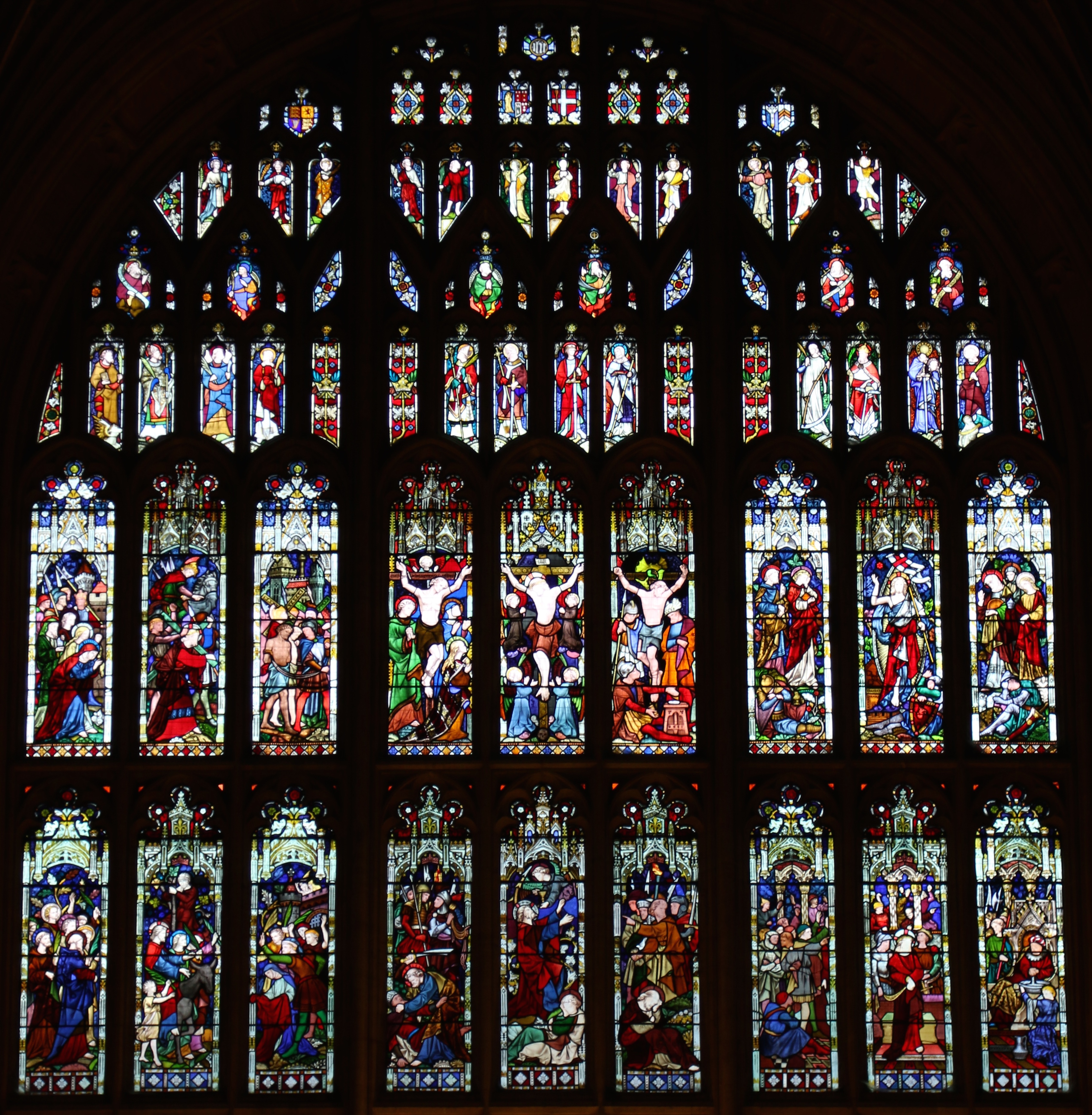
Choir east window by Clayton and Bell 1856 - 1858

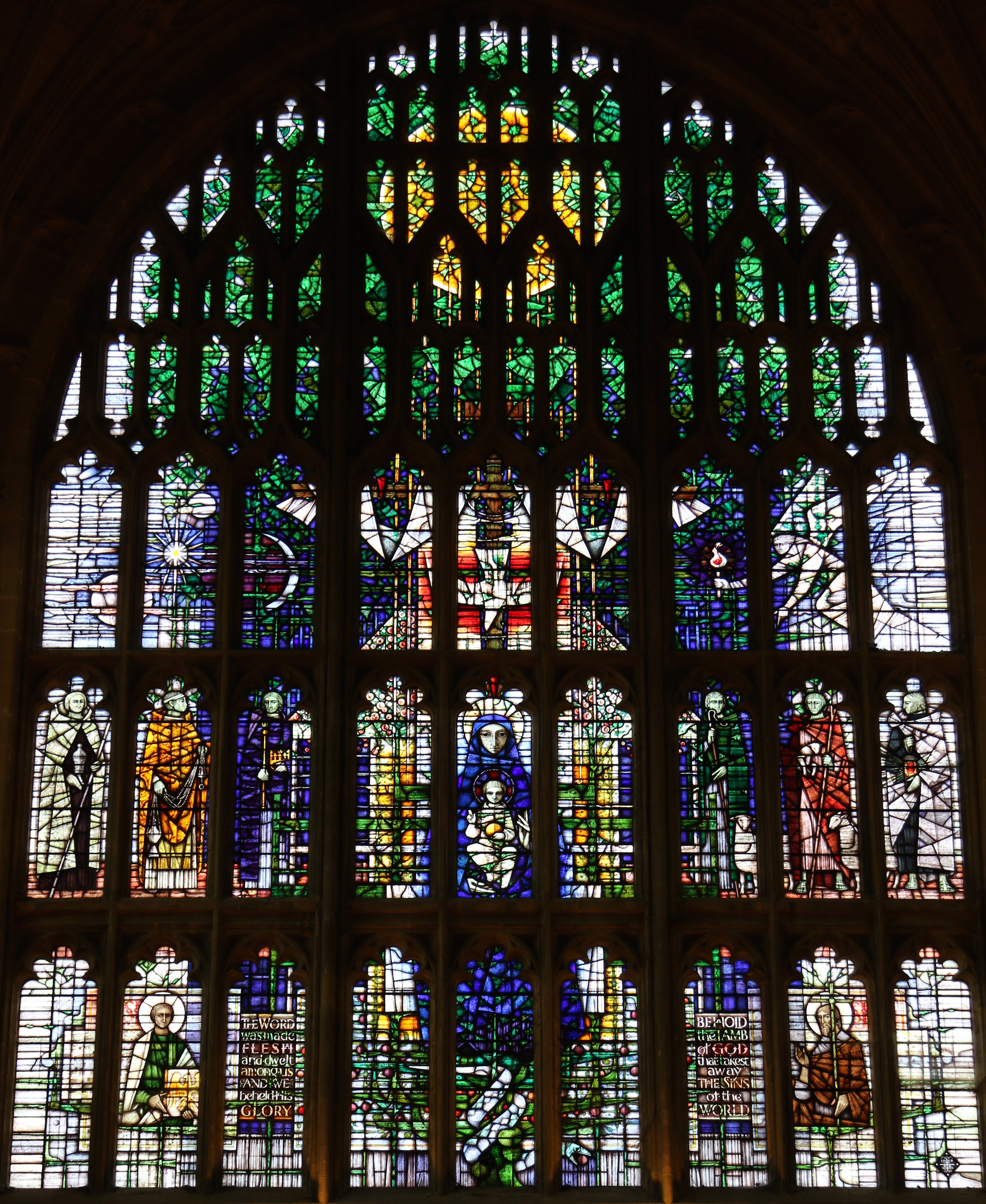
Nave west window by John Hayward 1996

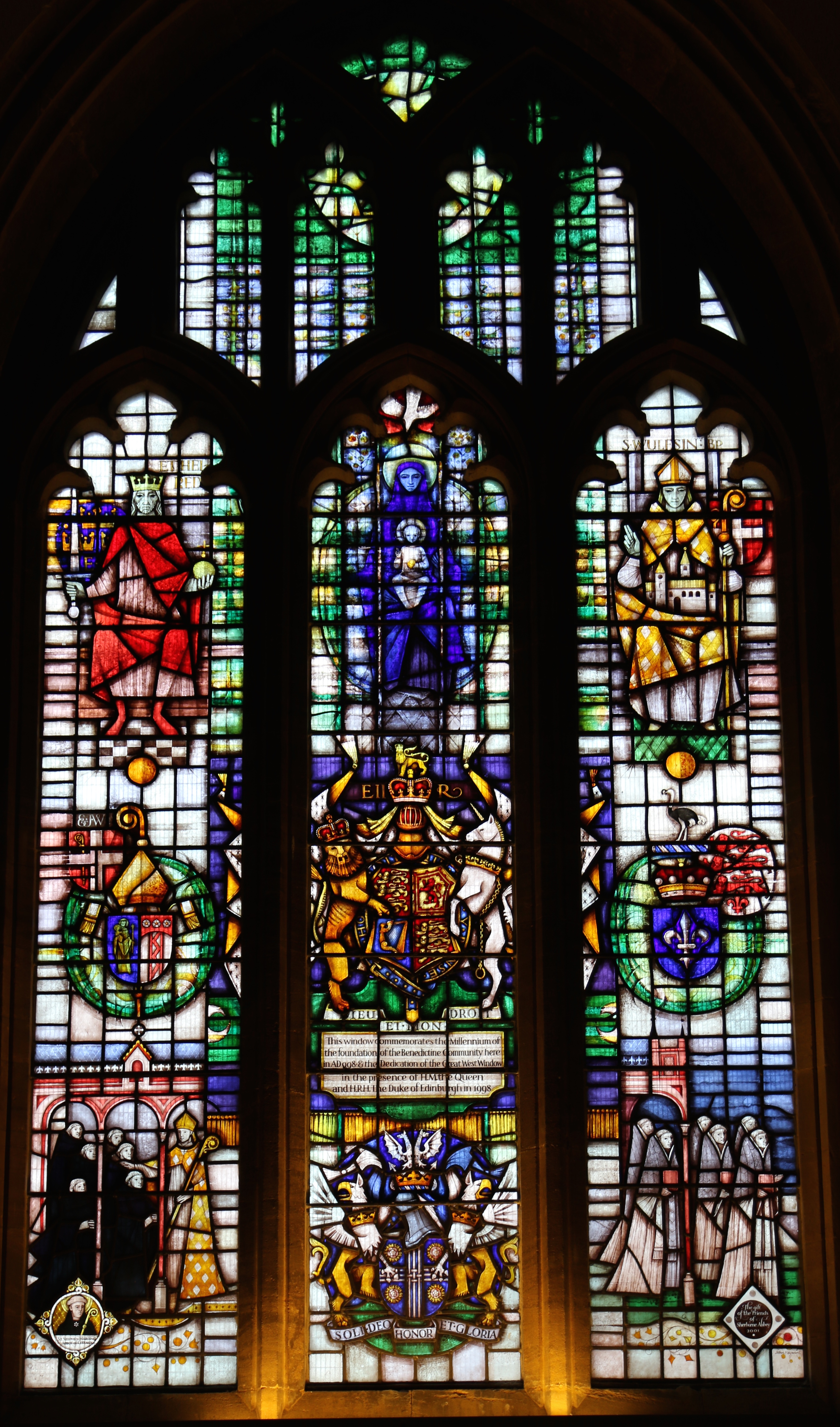
Millennium window by John Hayward 2001

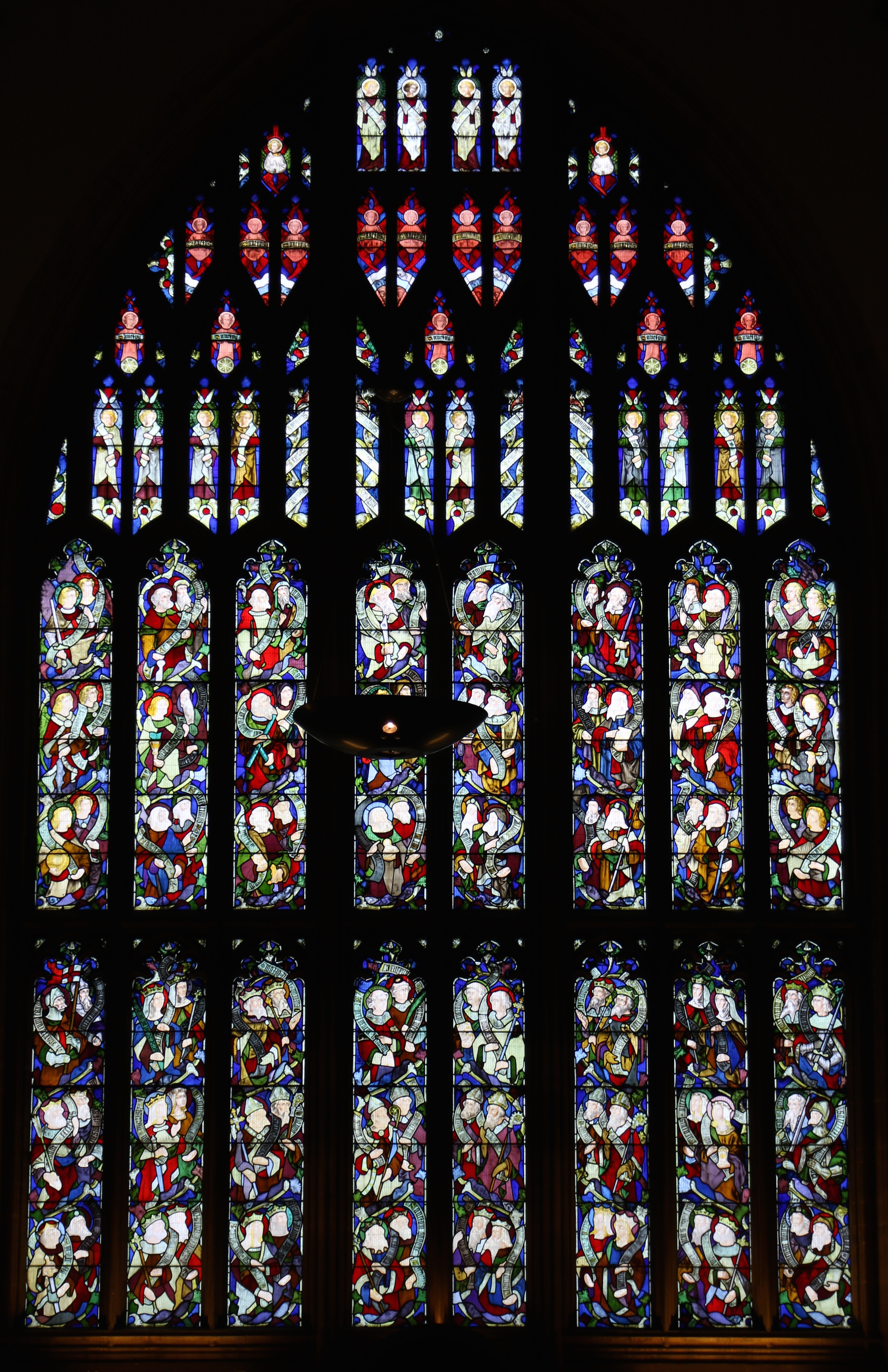
South transept south window by Augustus Welby Northmore Pugin

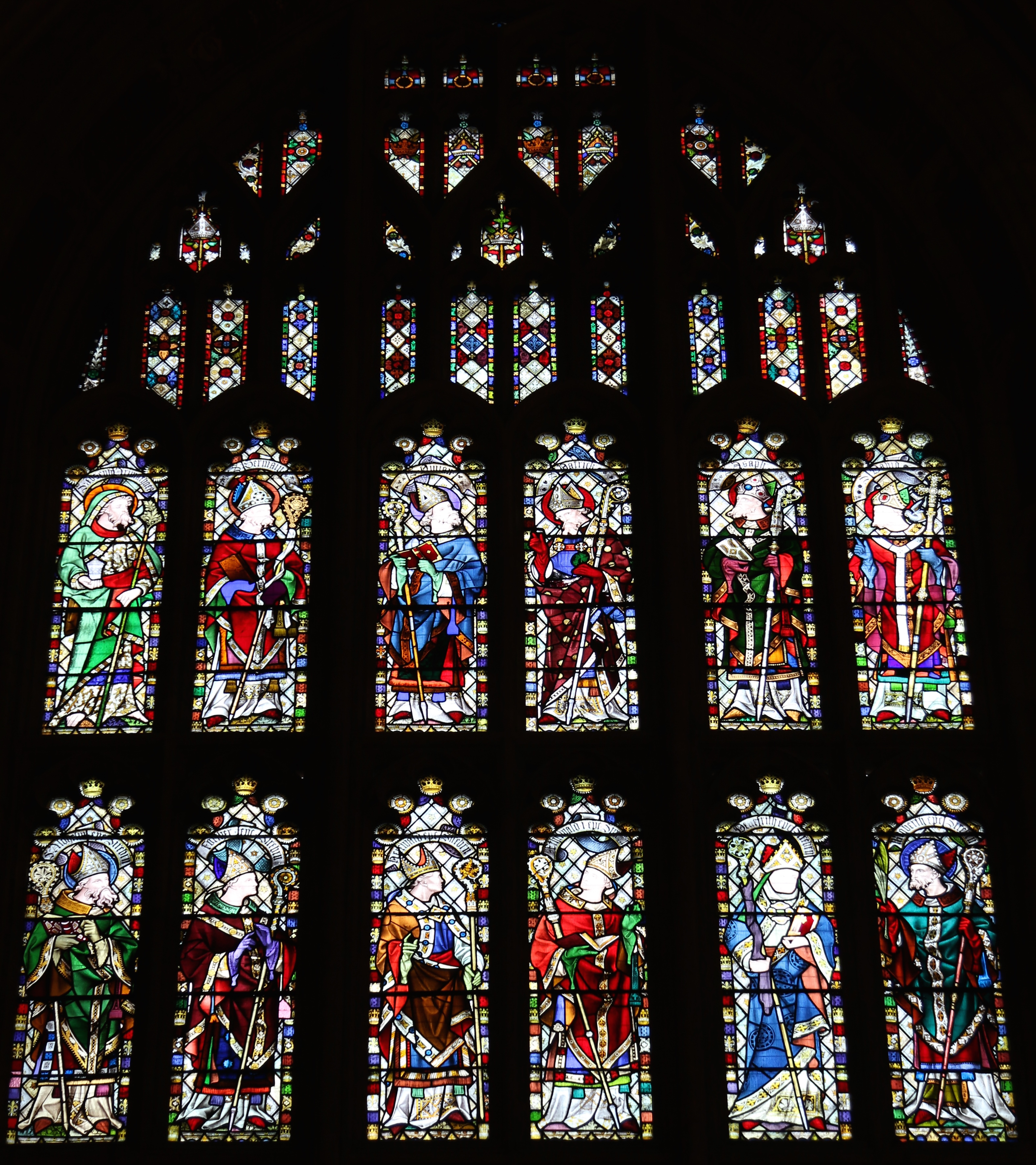
Choir clerestory window by Clayton and Bell 1856 - 1858

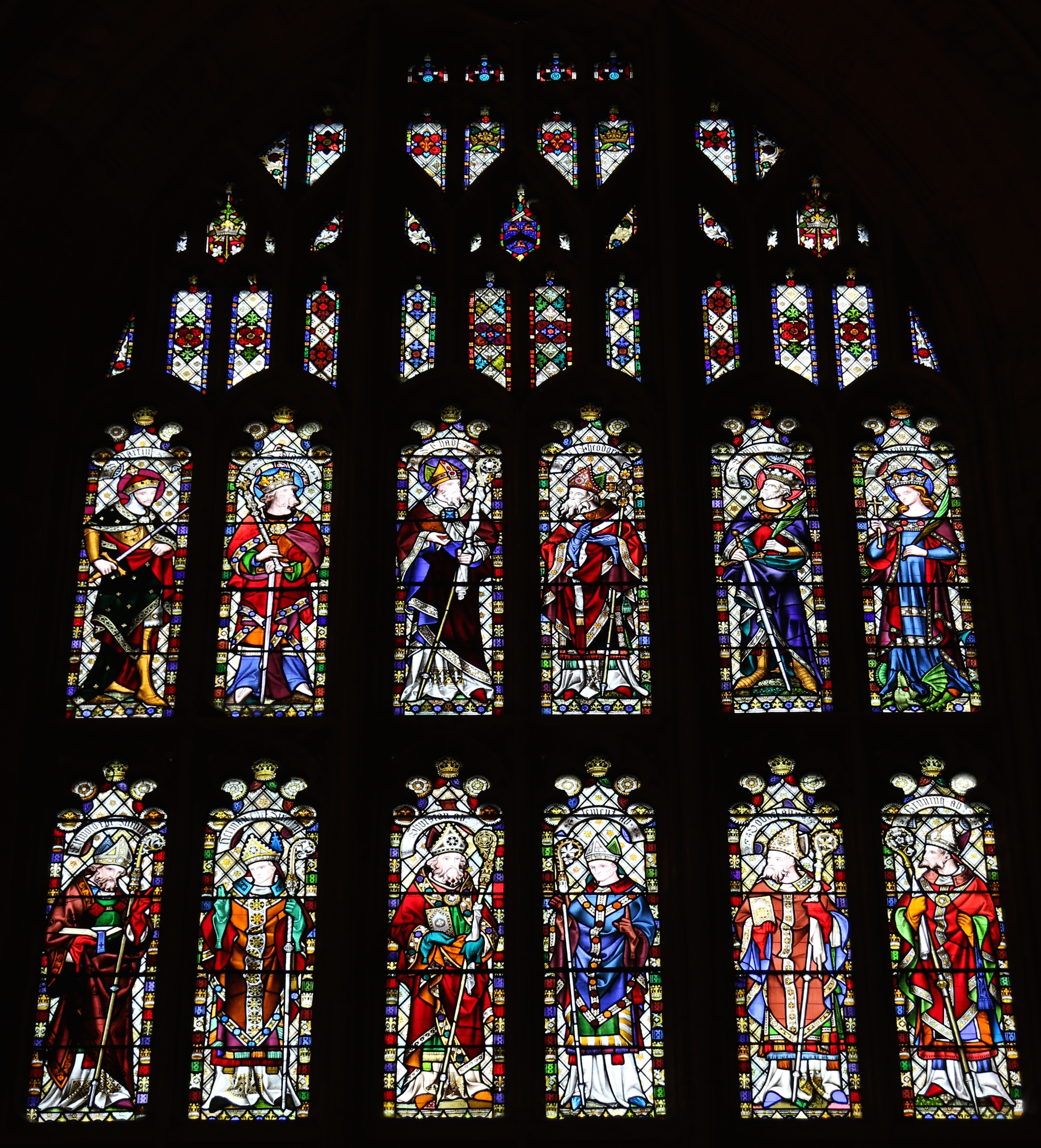
Choir clerestory window by Clayton and Bell 1856 - 1858

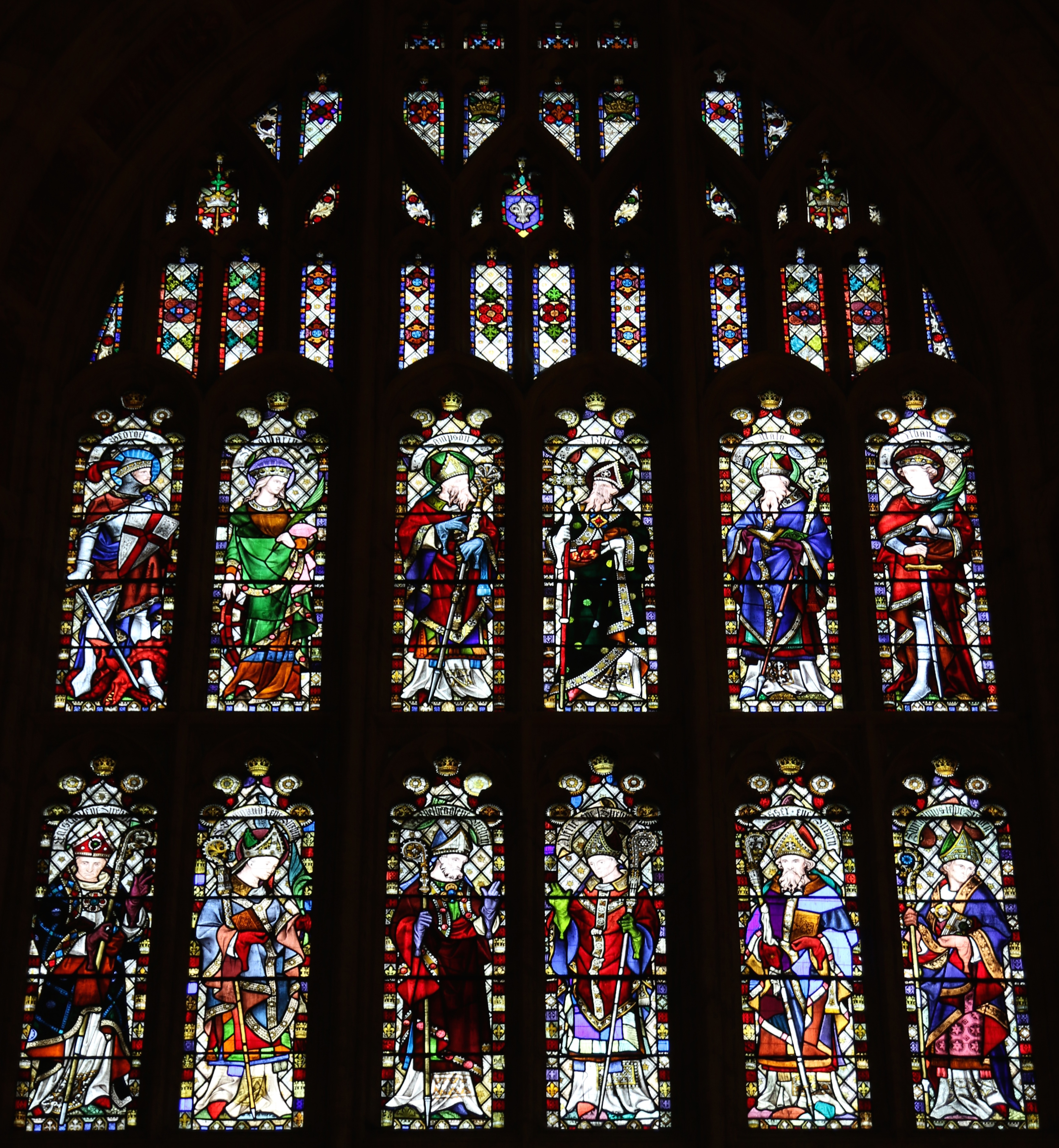
Choir clerestory window by Clayton and Bell 1856 - 1858

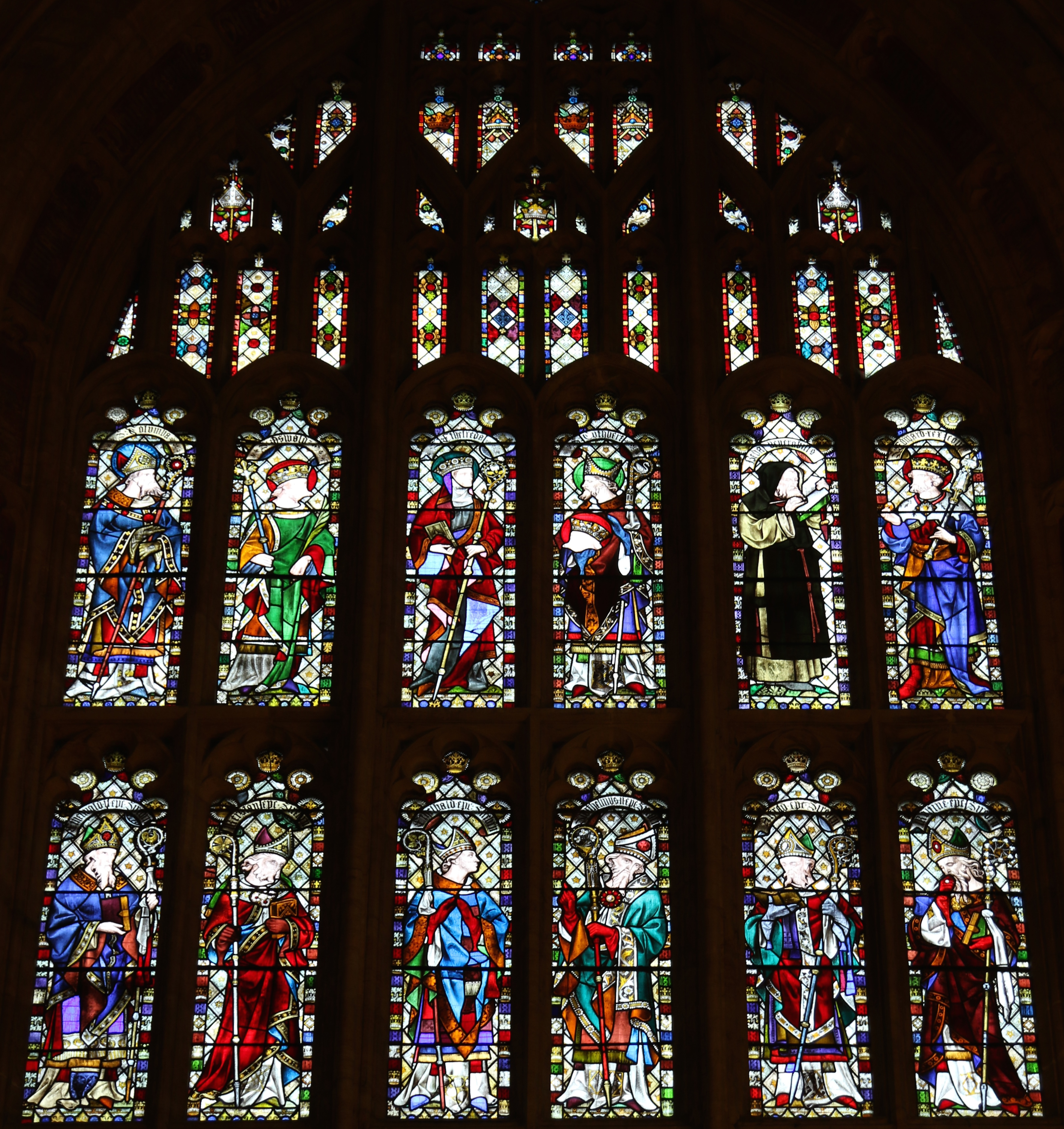
Choir clerestory window by Clayton and Bell 1856 - 1858

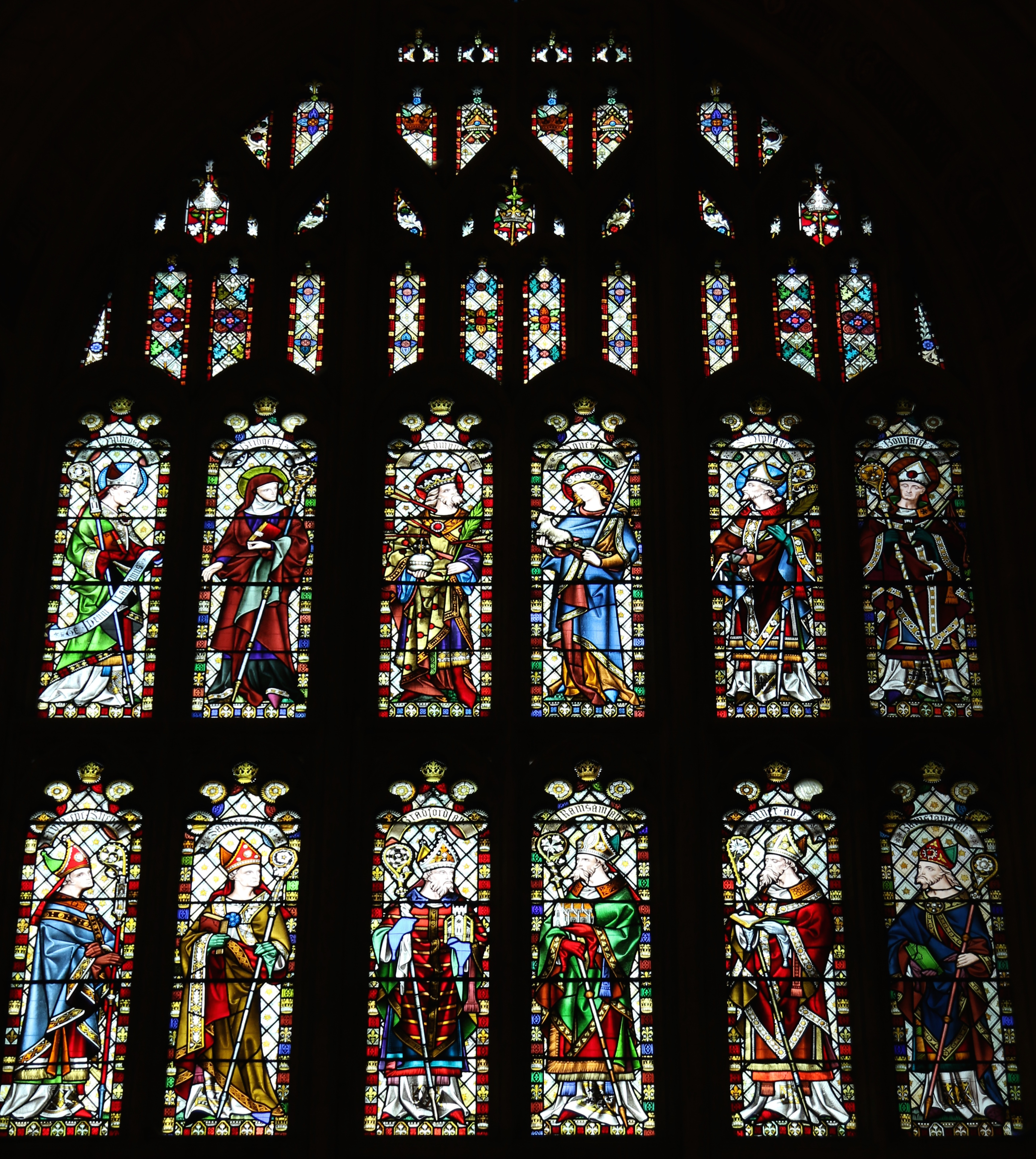
Choir clerestory window by Clayton and Bell 1856 - 1858

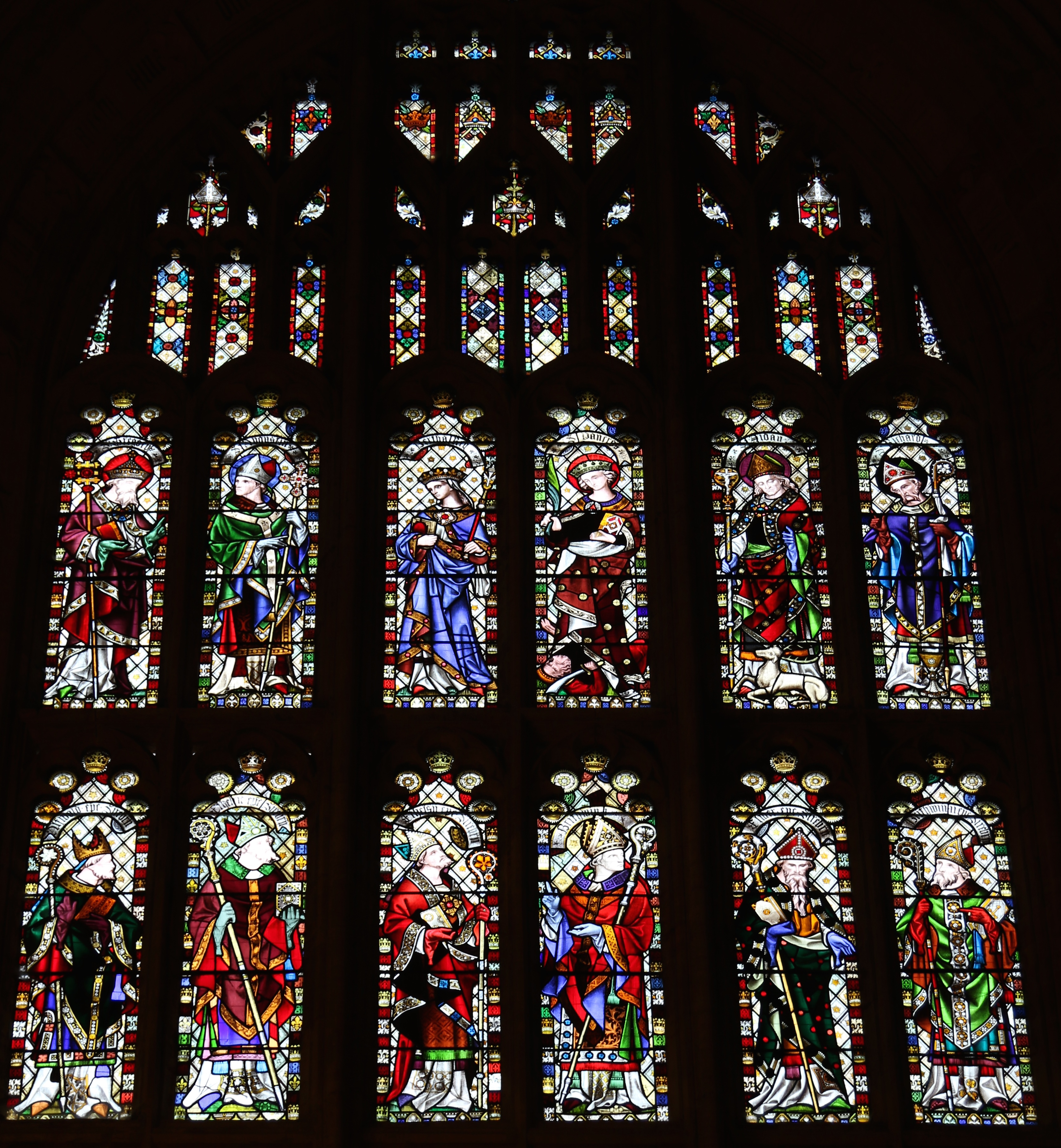
Choir clerestory window by Clayton and Bell 1856 - 1858

== Misericords ==
The abbey contains ten c.1440 misericords, situated five on each side of the choir. From west to east, these are carved as following:

N. side: man with hood and foliage; man gurning; Last Judgement, Resurrection of the dead at sides; man's face with foliage; foliage.

S. side: woman praying (possibly St. Margaret), winged monster below, leaves at sides; chained monkey and oak-leaves with acorns; man beating boy, boys at sides; archer shooting a man on horseback, Samson and lion at sides; woman beating man, leaves at sides.

== Bells ==
The C15th central tower contains the heaviest ring of eight bells in the world, with the tenor bell weighing of 46cwt and 5 lbs (5,157 lb or 2,340 kg). A ring should not be confused with a peal, which is a specific type of performance of change ringing.

Since before Norman times the bells were rung from the crossing, directly beneath the tower. Ringing such heavy bells with such long ropes would have taken a lot of effort; it was likely the heavier bells would have each taken two or three men to ring them. In 1858 a new ringing chamber was built just above the tower fan vaulting.

Details of the bells
| Bell | Diameter | Weight | Note | Cast | Founder | Inscriptions |
|---|---|---|---|---|---|---|
| Treble | 3' 1/8" | 9-0-25 | B♭ | 1858 | Whitechapel Bell Foundry | G. Mears founder London. Lord let the folk below – resound in living song — Thy praise as we do now — with iron tongue — August 18, 1858. |
| Second | 3' 2" | 10-1-3 | A | 1858 | Whitechapel Bell Foundry | G. Mears founder London. – We hang here to record – that the Choir was restored – in the year of our Lord – 1858. |
| Third | 3' 4" | 11-3-4 | G | 1903 | John Warner & Sons | W.M. Cast. F.R.S. Tho Gerard Gave ME RA. 1652 Recast John Warner & Sons Ltd 1903 |
| Fourth | 3' 6" | 12-1-6 | F | 1803 | Thomas & James Bilbie | Peace & plenty is the wish of Thomas Thorne & Samuel Ieffrey – Churchwardens 1803. Thomas & Iames Bilbie. Chewstoke, Somerset, fecit. |
| Fifth | 3' 10 3/4" | 16-3-3 | E♭ | 1787 | William Bilbie | Bartholomew Watts & Sweet Hart – Churchwardens 1787. Be meek & lowly to hear the word of God. William Bilbie. Chewstoke, Somerset, fecit |
| Sixth | 4' 2 3/4" | 22-1-4 | D | 1858 | Whitechapel Bell Foundry | G. Mears founder London 1858 |
| Seventh | 4' 8" | 28-0-18 | C | 1903 | John Warner & Sons | Campana — Domine — Iohn Whetcombe —Iohn Cooth — Wardens. 1653 RA Recast by John Warner & Sons Ltd 1903. William Hector Lyon M.A – Vicar. Mark Parsons, Frederick Bennet – Churchwardens |
| Tenor | 5' 4" | 46-0-5 | B♭ | 1933 | Whitechapel Bell Foundry | By Wolsey's gift I measure time for all. To mirth, to Grieffe, to Church, I serve to call. Recast 1670 by Thomas Purdue of Closworth Somerset. Joseph Barker – Vicar. Gustavus Horne, Walter Pride – Churchwardens. Again recast 1865, by John Warner & sons of London. Edward Harton – Vicar. James Hoddinott, Francis Stokes – Churchwardens. Again recast 1933, by Mears & Stainbank of London. Wilfred Marcus Askwith – Vicar. Clement Horrace Adams, James Florance – Churchwardens. |
| Sanctus | 1' 7 1/8 | c.1-2-0 | A♯ | c.1350 | | S[an]C[t]A MARIA ORA PRO NOBIS |
| Fire Bell | 2' 9 1/4 | n/k | n/k | 1653 | | Lord qvench the fvrious flame – Aris rvn help pvt ovt the same. IW IC. 1653 RA |

All inscriptions are in upper case and various decorative symbols have been omitted.

=== Notes ===
Seventh: Chimed from the choir each week as a call to morning prayer. Called the "Lady bell"

Tenor: This is the smallest of seven bells from Tournai, Belgium presented to English churches in 1514 by Cardinal Thomas Wolsey (1473–1530). This bell is known as Great Tom, after Thomas Wolsey. Though this bell was the smallest of the seven, it is the largest bell rung in a peal in England. The other six were given to the following churches in order of size: Christ Church, Oxford; Exeter; St Paul's; Lincoln: Canterbury and; Gloucester.

Sanctus: Chimed at the blessing of the sanctum during Communion.

Fire bell: It is unusual in that it has an in-turned lip, and so has a completely different sound to a conventional bell. However, it stopped being used in 1863.

The last restoration was carried out in 1995 by Nicholson Engineering of Bridport. This included the replacement of headstocks, bearings, wheels, pulley assemblies, clappers, stays and sliders, and the removal of the cast-in crown staples.

=== All Hallows bells ===
By the end of the 14th century, a ring of five or six bells was in use in All Hallows Parish Church, with the earliest known dating from 1514. Most of these were then transferred to the abbey tower.

== Organ ==
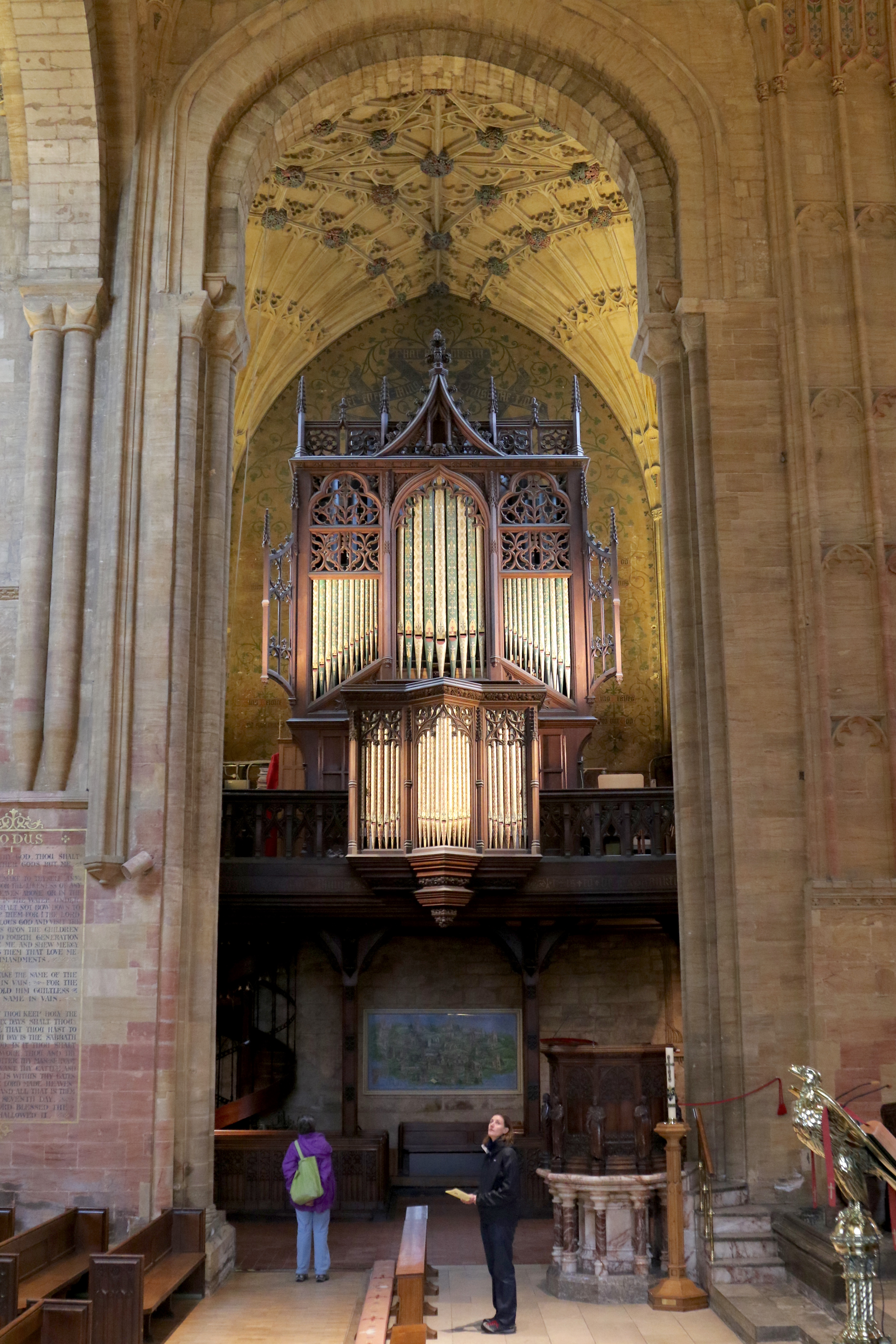
The organ in the north transept

The abbey's organ, located in the north transept, was installed in 1856 by Gray & Davison to some considerable acclaim. It was completely rebuilt in 1955 by J. W. Walker & Sons Ltd with a remote console in the crossing and a large specification. In 1972 John Coulson of Bristol again altered the organ by adding a neo-classically styled 'positiv' in place of the choir manual, some big mixtures on the great, solo mutations on the choir, and increased wind pressures throughout. By 1987 an increasing lack of reliability led to a proposed scheme by Bishop & Son of Ipswich, favouring a return to the Gray & Davison past by almost halving the number of stops, returning the console to the organ loft – attached to the case – and altering the choir division into more of a bombarde to try to overcome the difficulties of the position of the organ. After just over twenty years it was necessary for the organ to be rebuilt again, and in 2004/05 Kenneth Tickell changed the tonal quality of the instrument, installed new ranks in the choir and swell divisions, and provided a new solution to the location issue by installing a new nave division, located under the west window.

Despite these numerous alterations, much of the pedal division, some of the choir flutes and clarinet, all except the mixture on the great, and much of the chorus swell are original Gray & Davison stops.

=== List of organists ===
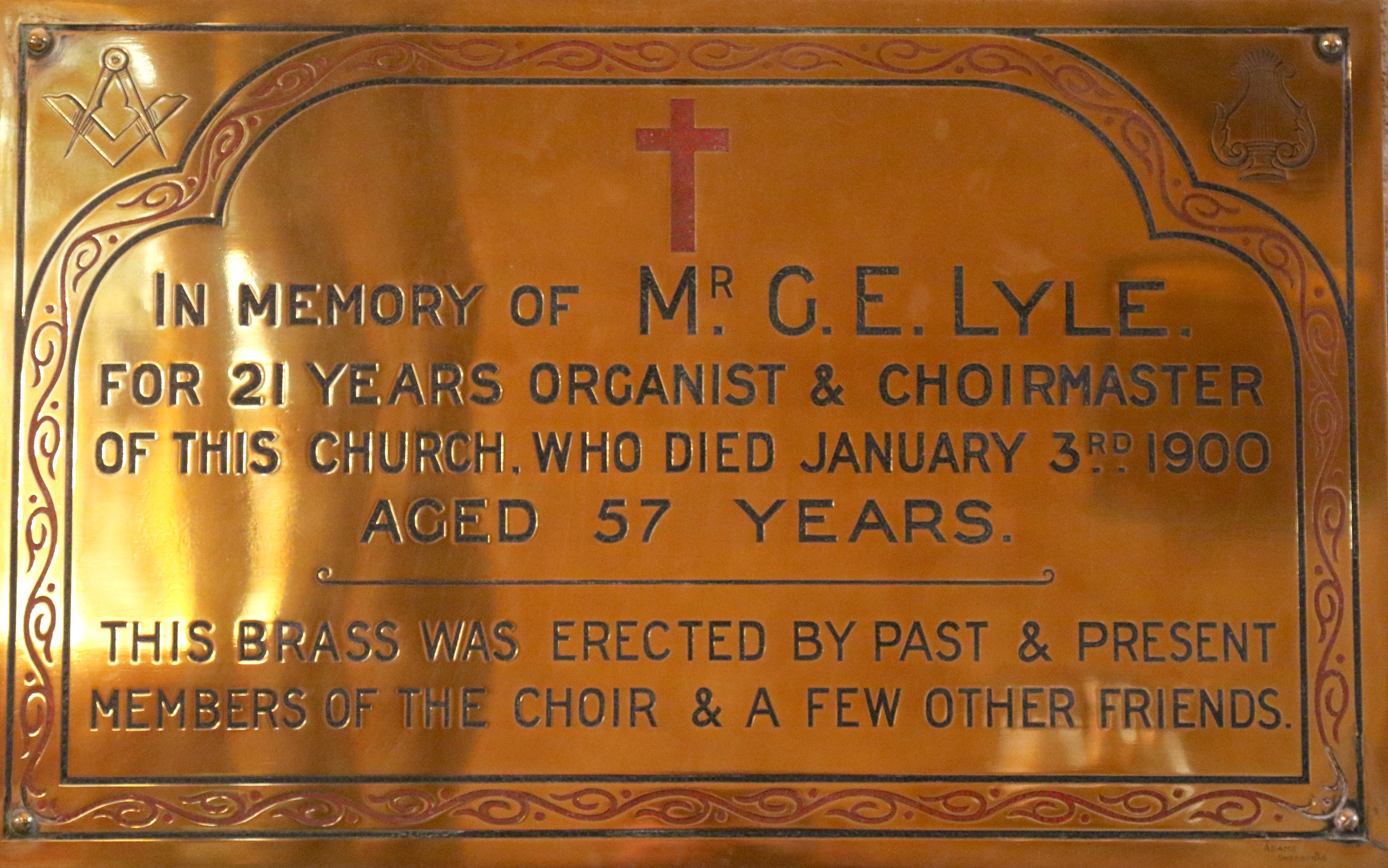
Memorial to George Edwin Lyle

- 1717–1729 John Windsor
- 1729–1737 John Merefield
- 1737–1739 John Broderip
- 1739–1741 Arnold Power
- 1741–1776 William Thompson
- 1776–1845 Thomas Hyde
- 1845–1848 Richard Linter (assistant from 1838)
- 1848–1849 James Vincent (pro tem)
- 1849–1856 Organ unusable – Barrel organ used
- 1852–1854 John Hopkins Nunn
- 1856–1858 Henry Morgan
- 1859–1872 Edward Herbert (precise year of appointment uncertain)
- 1872–1876 Robert P.C. Corfe
- 1876–1878 Henry J. Vaughan
- 1878–1889, 1895, 1900 George Edwin Lyle
- 1900–1901 James W. Burt (temporary during illness of Lyle)
- 1901–1907 Herbert William Chuter
- 1907–1914 Arnold Rudolph Mote (temporary during illness of Chuter)
- 1914–1954 William Edward Wearden
- 1954 Benjamin Picton (temporary)
- 1954–1959 John L. Dussek
- 1959–1964 Frederick C. Fea (formerly organist of St John's Church, Torquay)
- 1964–1965 Peter Burness (temporary)
- 1965–1999 Julian Dams
- 1999–2002 John Padley
- 2002–2006 Joseph Sentence (formerly organist of St George's Minster, Doncaster)
- 2006–2019 Paul C. Ellis
- 2019–present James Henderson

==== Assistant organists ====
- 1838–1845 Richard Linter
- 1983–1984 James Henderson
- 2001–2025 Peter Bray
- 2024–2026 Charlie Gurnham (Assistant Director of Music)
- 2026-present Richard Mayo (Assistant Director of Music)

== Clergy ==
Sources for the following names and dates include the Registrum Sacrum Anglicanum by William Stubbs (1897), surviving charter signatures, W.B. Wildman's A Short History of Sherborne (1902), records from Sherborne Abbey, archived theses, and several online resources. Where sources' dates conflict or are unclear, either the most reliable source is used, or the date that corresponds to the most individual sources is used. The spelling of names is derived from both reliable sources and historical consensus.

=== Bishops ===
The Bishop of Sherborne was established in 705 by St Aldhelm, the Abbot of Malmesbury. It was discontinued when the see of Sherborne was transferred to Old Sarum in 1075. The title Bishop of Sherborne was revived by the Church of England as a suffragan bishopric in the Diocese of Salisbury.

Bishops

- 705 St Aldhelm
- 709 Forthere
- 736 Herewald
- 766 Æthelmod
- 793 Denefrith
- 796 Wigberht
- 817 Eahlstan
- 867 St Heahmund
- 871 Æthelheah
- 873 Wulfsige I
- 899 Asser
- 909 Æthelweard
- 909 Wærstan
- 918 Æthelbald
- 926 Sigehelm
- 933 Alfred
- 943 Wulfsige II
- 958 Brihthelm
- 961 Ælfwold I
- 978 Æthelsige I
- 992 Wulfsige III O.S.B* (first Abbot of Sherborne)
- 1001 Æthelric
- 1012 Æthelsige II
- 1015 Brihtwine I
- 1017 Ælfmær
- 1023 Brihtwine II
- 1045 Ælfwold II (St Ælfwold)
- 1058 Herman

*O.S.B = Ordo Sancti Benedicti (Order of Saint Benedict)

Bishops of Sarum who were also Abbots of Sherborne

- 1078 Osmund
- 1099 vacant
- 1102 Roger

=== Suffragan bishops ===
- 1925 Robert Abbott
- 1928 Gerald Allen
- 1936 Harold Rogers
- 1947 Maurice Key
- 1960 Victor Pike
- 1976 John Kirkham
- 2001 Tim Thornton
- 2009 Graham Kings
- 2016 Karen Gorham

=== Abbots ===
- 1122 Thurstan
- 1145 Peter
- 1146 Henry
- 1155 Clement
- 1189 William de Stoke
- 1217 Philip
- 1227 William de Tewkesbury
- 1227 Henry
- 1242 John de Hele
- 1246 Lawrence de Bradford
- 1260 John de Saunde
- 1281 Robert
- 1286 John de Stapelbrigge (Stalbridge)
- 1310 John de Thornford
- 1316 Robert de Ramsbury
- 1329 John de Compton
- 1342 John de Henton (Hinton)
- 1348 John Frith de Sherborne
- 1371 Edward Goude
- 1385 Robert Brunyng
- 1415 John Brunyng
- 1436 William Bradford
- 1459 John Saunder
- 1475 Peter Ramsam (or Rampisham)
- 1505 John Mere
- 1535 John Barnstable

=== Vicars ===
The following is an incomplete list of vicars since about 1400. In the 1900s the position changed from that of vicar to rector.

==== All Hallows (Alhalowes) ====
- 1228 Roger Everard
- William Dalton
- 1401 John Campeden
- 1419 Alexander Sparrowe
- 1440 John Pedel
- 1465 William pride
- 1529 John Poskyn MA

==== St. Mary's ====
- 1540 John Chetmyll
- 1566 George Holman BA
- 1580 David Dee BA
- 1585 Francis Scarlett
- 1632 William Lyford BD
- 1657 Francis Bamfield MA
- 1663 Joseph Barker MA
- 1667 John Elford BA
- 1682 John Henchman
- 1692 John Holland MA
- 1693 James Lacey MA
- 1743 John Loop BA
- 1749 John Samson MA
- 1773 Edward Cotes LL D
- 1780 Nathaniel Bristed MA
- 1811 William Gorton MA
- 1830 John Parsons MA
- 1854 Edward Harston MA
- 1868 William Hector Lyon MA
- 1908 Sidney Augustus Selwyn
- 1916 Stephen H. Wingfield Digby
- 1932 Wilfred Marcus Askwith
- 1939 John P. W. Lovett
- 1947 Stephen Basil Wingfield Digby
- 1969 F. Paul P. Goddard
- 1987 Robert Andrew Willis
- 1993 Eric John Woods
- 2021 Martin Paul Lee

=== Archdeacons ===
The archdeaconry was created in 1916 and the current archdeacon, since 2018, is Penny Sayer.

== See also ==
- Adam of Barking
- List of former cathedrals in England, Wales and the Isle of Man
- List of English abbeys, priories and friaries serving as parish churches
