= Archdeacon of Sherborne =

Church of England ecclesiastical office

The Archdeacon of Sherborne is a senior ecclesiastical officer within the Diocese of Salisbury, England. They are responsible for the disciplinary supervision of the clergy within the five area deaneries: Dorchester, Lyme Bay, Sherborne, Weymouth and Portland, and Blackmore Vale.

The archdeaconry was created by Order in Council of 31 March 1916 from the Archdeaconry of Dorset. The current archdeacon is Penny Sayer.

== List of archdeacons ==
- 1916–1919 (ret.): Frederic Wallis
- 1919–1941 (ret.): Albert Joscelyne, Assistant Bishop, Vicar of Chardstock (until 1930), then of Preston (1930–1937)
- 1941–1961 (res.): Jack Chute, Rector of Piddlehinton (until 1957)
- 1961–1967 (res.): David Maddock, Rector of Bradford Peverell and Stratton (until 1966), then of West Stafford with Frome Billet (became Bishop suffragan of Dunwich)
- 1967–1984 (ret.): Edwin Ward, Rector of West Stafford (afterwards Archdeacon Emeritus)
- 1985–1990 (res.): John Oliver (became Bishop of Hereford)
- 1991–2003 (ret.): Paul Wheatley, Priest in Charge of West Stafford with Frome Billet (afterwards Archdeacon Emeritus)
- 2004 – 24 May 2018 (ret.): Paul Taylor (afterwards Archdeacon Emeritus)
- 25 November 2018 – present: Penny Sayer
