= Paul Taylor (priest) =

Paul Stanley Taylor (born 28 March 1953) is an Anglican priest and was Archdeacon of Sherborne in the Diocese of Salisbury until his 24 May 2018 retirement, when he became Archdeacon Emeritus.

He was educated at Westminster College, Oxford and Westcott House, Cambridge. He holds the B.Ed. and M.Th. degrees from the University of Oxford. He was ordained deacon in 1984; and priest in 1985, in the Diocese of London. Following a curacy at St Stephen, Bush Hill Park he held incumbencies in Southgate and Hendon. He was Director of Post Ordination Training for the Edmonton Area of London Diocese and Area Dean of West Barnet. He was collated as Archdeacon of Sherborne by the Bishop of Salisbury in July 2004 and made Canon and Prebendary of Salisbury Cathedral in September of the same year.

He is captain of the Church of England golf team and the Great Britain & Ireland clergy golf team (known as the Cranmer Cup team). Other sporting passions include coxing the Founders Company Thames Waterman's Cutter and supporting Arsenal FC and Saracens RFC.

He is a Freeman of the City of London and a Liveryman of the Worshipful Company of Founders.

Paul was married to Janet for over 36 years. Janet died of cancer on 29 January 2021 aged 57. They have three sons, Joe, Matt, and Ben, and grandsons, Henry and Rory.

Church of England titles
Preceded by Paul Charles Wheatley	Archdeacon of Sherborne; 2004–2018	Succeeded by Penny Sayer
