= Clifton Maybank =

Hamlet in Dorset, England

Coordinates: 50.9221°N 2.6036°W

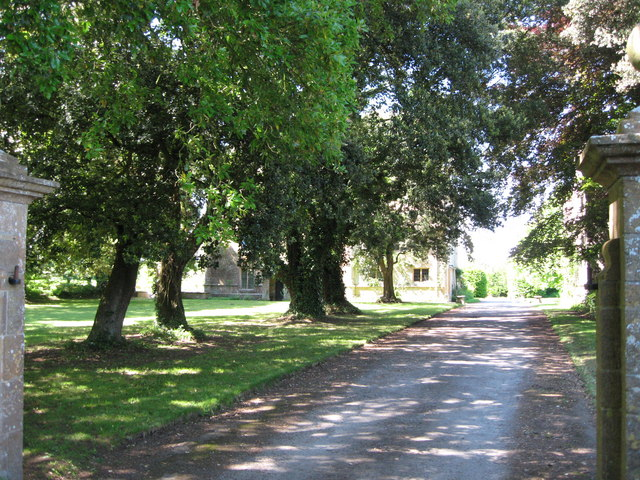
- Clifton Maybank House

- Location within Dorset
- Population: 40
- OS grid reference: ST577138
- Unitary authority: Dorset
- Ceremonial county: Dorset
- Region: South West
- Country: England
- Sovereign state: United Kingdom
- Post town: YEOVIL
- Postcode district: BA22
- Dialling code: 01935
- Police: Dorset
- Fire: Dorset and Wiltshire
- Ambulance: South Western
- UK Parliament: West Dorset

Clifton Maybank is a hamlet and civil parish in the English county of Dorset. It is located about a mile southwest of the village of Bradford Abbas. It is known for Clifton Maybank House, a country house with surviving Tudor fabric. Dorset County Council estimate that the population of the parish in 2013 was 40.

== Clifton Maybank settlement ==
Clifton Maybank is recorded in the Domesday Book as Clistone, held by William Malbank, a tenant of Hugh, Earl of Chester in 1086, and it is from Malbank that the 'Maybank' suffix derives.

Writing in 1811, Samuel Lewis stated that the village had 60 inhabitants and that the church at Clifton Maybank had "been in ruins for a century".

== Clifton Maybank GWR railway station ==
On 13 June 1864 a new line was opened from the GWR Wilts, Somerset and Weymouth line up to a new Clifton Maybank goods station located on the south side of the LSWR Yeovil Junction railway station. The GWR was, until 1874, a 7 ft (2,134 mm) broad gauge line and broad and standard gauge wagons could be brought alongside each other at Clifton Maybank to allow goods to be transhipped between them.

The transfer shed used for transhipping goods and approximately ¼ mile of track along the Clifton Maybank spur are now part of the Yeovil Railway Centre, where steam trains named the Clifton Maybank Rambler are being run in 2019.

== Clifton Maybank House ==
Once site of an ancient chapelry dependent of nearby Yetminster, the early history of the house of Clifton Maybank (sometimes named Clifton Maubank or Clifton House) is obscure. Remaining are several structures, some of which were formerly interconnected, and part of which (called by Rogers, a screen) was removed to nearby Montacute House.

The Horsey family of Horsey near Bridgwater in Somerset held properties in and around Clifton Maybank during the fifteenth century. When John Horsey (1479–1531) died, he was buried at Yetminster parish church, near Clifton Maybank. His son, Sir John Horsey substantially increased the family's wealth and power. Little is known of the Horsey family house at Clifton Maybank at this time, but it is known that the poet Sir Thomas Wyatt died while staying at the house in 1542. Sir John died four years later in 1546. Soon after this his oldest son, Sir John Horsey, made Clifton Maybank his principal residence and began a major and expensive rebuilding process on the house, using the local Ham stone. It has been described as "one of the most spectacular of the group of contemporary houses in the district, which included Barrington, Melbury, and Montacute." The Horsey family fortunes entered a period of slow decline, and in 1786 much of the house was dismantled and sold – one main front of the building being transferred to Montacute House and the early 17th century lodge was removed in 1800 to Hinton St George.

After decline in the 18th century the buildings became a working farm, but were then restored in the late 19th – early 20th century. The house itself was reconditioned in 1906-7 with additions on the north and east sides. The present house is thought to have been the east wing of the original building, of which the main block extended to the west from the middle of the existing wing. The south front of the present house is original and was formerly of two storeys with attics (as was the front transferred to Montacute). The door in the modern porch incorporates some late 16th-century woodwork. The west front may have been redesigned after the 1786 demolitions, but the central gable has a reset oriel window with Tudor roses and horses' heads (for Horsey). An early 16th-century detached building to the southeast has also been remodelled: it originally extended further northwards. No depiction of the original building is known. The house was the country home of the art historian Professor Michael Jaffé.

There is archaeological evidence of the pre-1650 landscape in the grounds of Clifton Maybank House.

Clifton Maybank House is Grade I listed and the gardens are also of note, although they are not listed on the English Heritage Register of Parks and Gardens of Special Historic Interest in England.
