= Paul Wheatley (priest) =

English Anglican priest (1938–2023)

Paul Charles Wheatley (27 May 1938 – 19 October 2023) was an Anglican priest who was the Archdeacon of Sherborne and Rector of West Stafford in Dorset from 1991 to 2003.

Wheatley was educated at Durham University and ordained deacon in 1964 and priest in 1985. Following a curacy in Bishopston he was youth chaplain in the Diocese of Bristol from 1963 to 1968. He held incumbencies in Dorcan and Ross on Wye before his archdeacon’s appointment.

Wheatley retired in 2003, returning to live near Ross-on-Wye.

Church of England titles
Preceded by John Keith Oliver	Archdeacon of Sherborne; 1991–2003	Succeeded by Paul Stanley Taylor
