= Adam of Barking =

13th-century English Benedictine monk and poet

- Died: (fl. 1217)
- Education: Oxford (according to John Bale and John Pitts)
- Occupations: Benedictine monk, religious poet
- Era: Medieval
- Known for: Writings, including De Serie Sex Ætatum

Adam of Barking (fl. 1217?) was a Benedictine monk and religious poet who left a number of writings including De Serie Sex Ætatum which runs to 15,000 lines of hexameter. He belonged to the abbey of Sherborne in Dorset.

Adam of Barking is praised by the 16th-century antiquary John Leland for his great erudition, and his promise as a writer both in prose and verse. According to John Bale and John Pitts, Adam was educated at Oxford, and was a model of all the Christian virtues. As old age came on he devoted himself more and more to the study of Scripture and the work of public preaching. For the latter task he seems to have been peculiarly fitted, and his biographers make special mention of his eloquence and zeal in lashing the vices of the people. Bale and Pitts say that he flourished about the year 1217, and this date may be fairly correct, as one of his works was dedicated to John, canon of Salisbury, who is doubtless to be identified with the far-famed John of Salisbury who died in 1180.

Of Adam's writings, which embraced treatises on the Old Testament as well as the New, there were existing at Sherborne in Leland's time: De Naturâ divinâ et humanâ (verse), De Serie Sex Ætatum (verse), Super Quatuor Evangelia (prose). According to Tanner a manuscript of this author is to be found in the library of Clare College, Cambridge. An incomplete list of his works enumerated by John Pitts includes In vetus et novum testamentum (said to be at Cambridge), In quatuor Evangelia ad Ioannem Sarisburiensem, De duplici Christi natura, Rithmorum et carminum, and Sermonum ad populum.
