= Penny Sayer =

British Anglican priest (born 1959)

The Venerable Penny Sayer
- Archdeacon of Sherborne
- Church: Church of England
- Diocese: Diocese of Salisbury
- In office: November 2018 to present
- Predecessor: Paul Taylor

Orders
- Ordination: 2007 (deacon); 2008 (priest)

Personal details
- Born: 1959 (age 66–67)
- Denomination: Anglicanism
- Education: South East Institute for Theological Education

Penelope Jane Sayer (born 1959) is a British Anglican priest. Since 2018, she has served as Archdeacon of Sherborne in the Church of England's Diocese of Salisbury. She had served in parish ministry in the Dioceses of Chichester and of Chelmsford, before becoming an archdeacon.

== Ordained ministry ==
Sayer trained for Holy Orders at South East Institute for Theological Education, and was ordained in the Church of England as a deacon in 2007 and as a priest in 2008. She served her curacy at St John the Evangelist's Church, St Leonards-on-Sea in the Diocese of Chichester as a non-stipendiary minister (ie unpaid and part-time) between 2007 and 2010.

She then moved to the Diocese of Chelmsford, where she was team rector of the Parish of Becontree South from 2010 to 2016. She was appointed to a newly created position in 2016 as "Turnaround Minister" for the Bradwell Area of the diocese. She was tasked with assisting struggling parishes, and was also appointed non-stipendiary minister of St Margaret's, Woodham Mortimer and St Michael's, Woodham Walter.

In July 2018, Sayer was announced as the next Archdeacon of Sherborne in the Diocese of Salisbury, in succession to Paul Taylor. She was collated as archdeacon during a service at Sherborne Abbey on 25 November 2018.
