= Slype =

Type of covered passage in architecture

The West Slype at Gloucester Cathedral gives access to the cloister

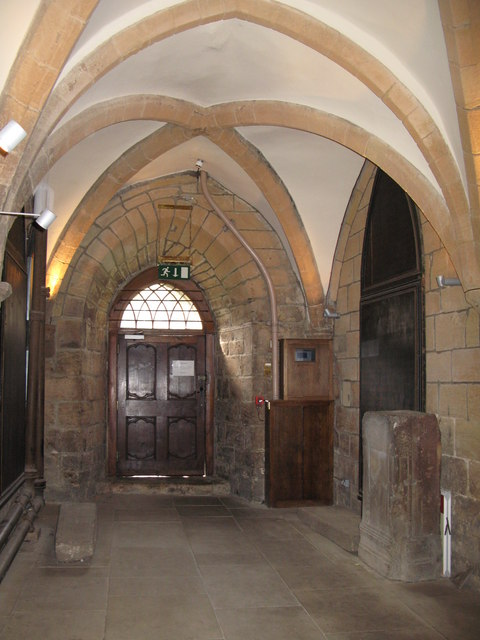
The Slype at Hexham Abbey

In ecclesiastical architecture, a slype (likely a variation of ‘slip’, meaning ‘narrow passage’) is a type of covered passage that can be found in some medieval monasteries and cathedrals.

The slype is usually located between the transept and the chapter house, as at St Andrews, Winchester, Exeter, Durham, St. Albans, Sherborne and Christ Church Cathedral, Oxford, though this position can vary. At Gloucester Cathedral, the west slype connects the cloister to the west front. The slype at St. Mary's Abbey, Dublin is notable for being one of the only remaining parts of the abbey, along with the chapter house.

Architectural historians have described slypes in various ways. In 1920, Albert Phelps wrote about the space in Architecture: The Professional Architectural Monthly:

In general, the Benedictine chapter-house, as it took form in England, was an oblong room about twice as long as wide ... either north or south of the transept, from which it was separated by a narrow passage or chamber called a "slype."

In 1887, the Dictionary of Architecture noted the following:

[The slype's] place is supplied by the Sacristry in Cistercian houses. It occurs in the Clugniac convent of Bromholme, and in that of Austin Canons at Newstead. At New college, Oxford, it is the passage between the backs of the houses and the city walls ....
