= John Horsey (died 1564) =

16th-century English politician

Sir John Horsey JP (died 30 January 1564) was a knight of Henry VIII (knighted 22 February 1546) and Lord of the Manors of Clifton Maubank and South Perrott.

He was the son of Sir John Horsey (died 1546) and Joan Mawdley. He inherited most of his father's lands, and the wording of the will suggests that the two were not close and the son was regarded as untrustworthy. He eventually became addicted to gambling, and this, along with his extravagant construction projects, was a large drain on the family coffers.

Sir John married Edith Phelips, daughter of Sir Richard Phelips and widow of the merchant John Stocker of Poole, on 14 December 1539. In 1546, the family estate, Clifton Maybank on the south side of Yeovil (in which his father's friend, the poet Sir Thomas Wyatt, died on 11 October 1542), was largely rebuilt to create a mansion of grand proportions. An entrance to the newly built mansion had intricate stone carvings around the doorway, celebrating their marriage. This entrance was later removed and added to the west entrance of Montacute House when much of the original mansion of Clifton Maybank was dismantled in 1786. Today, only one part of the original Tudor building remains, with a facade added in 1906; no plan of the original building has been discovered.

He was elected knight of the shire for Dorset in 1553 and appointed Sheriff of Somerset and Dorset for 1559.

Sir John and Edith had one son, Sir John Horsey (1546–1588) and two daughters, Elizabeth and Mary. He is buried in Sherborne Abbey: an impressive tomb for both himself and his father, with life-size effigies of the two in medieval armour is to be found there in the Wykeham Chapel.
