= Edmund Ward =

Edmund Ward may refer to:

- Edmund Franklin Ward (1892–1990), American illustrator
- Edmund Ward (architect) (1912–1998), British architect, co-founder of GMW Architects
- Edmund Ward (screenwriter) (1928–1993), British novelist and screenwriter
- Ed Ward (writer) (1948–2021), American writer and radio commentator
- Edmund Ward Ltd, British publishers

== See also ==
- Ed Ward (disambiguation)
