= John Horsey (died 1546) =

English knight

Sir John Horsey (died 23 December 1546) was a knight of Henry VIII and Lord of the Manor of Clifton Maubank. He was also a friend of the poet Thomas Wyatt.

He was born the son of Sir John Horsey (died 8 July 1531) and Elizabeth Turges. He married Joan Mawdley by whom he had two sons, Sir John Horsey (1510-64/65) and Roger Horsey, and two daughters, Mary and Joan, or according to Rogers, Elizabeth and Eleanor.

He served as a justice of the peace in Somerset and Dorset, and served as Sheriff for those counties for 1537 and 1544. He was elected knight of the shire (MP) for Dorset in 1529 and 1539.

When Henry VIII dissolved the monasteries in the 16th century, Sir John, intending to collect a large share of the monastic property from the Crown, bribed Thomas Cromwell, 1st Earl of Essex to appoint the compliant John Barnstable Abbot of Sherborne Abbey. John Barnstable was accordingly elected on 31 May 1535, and subsequently surrendered the monastery on 18 March 1539. The deed was acknowledged by his signature and those of 16 monks, who all got pensions. On 4 January 1539, "the demesne lands of the monastery" including the Great Court, the Abbot's Garden, West Garden, Pyggy's Barton and the Prior's Garden, all in Sherborne, were assigned by Henry VIII to Horsey, for which Horsey paid £1,242 3s. 9d. to the King, plus £16 10s. 6d. for "the site of the church, steeple, campanile and churchyard of the monastery," and other property.

Horsey subsequently sold Sherborne Abbey to the townspeople and vicar. Both Horsey and his son are buried in Sherborne Abbey: an "impressive" tomb with life-size effigies of the two in medieval armour is to be found there in the Wykeham Chapel.
