= Albert Joscelyne =

English Anglican bishop (1866–1945)

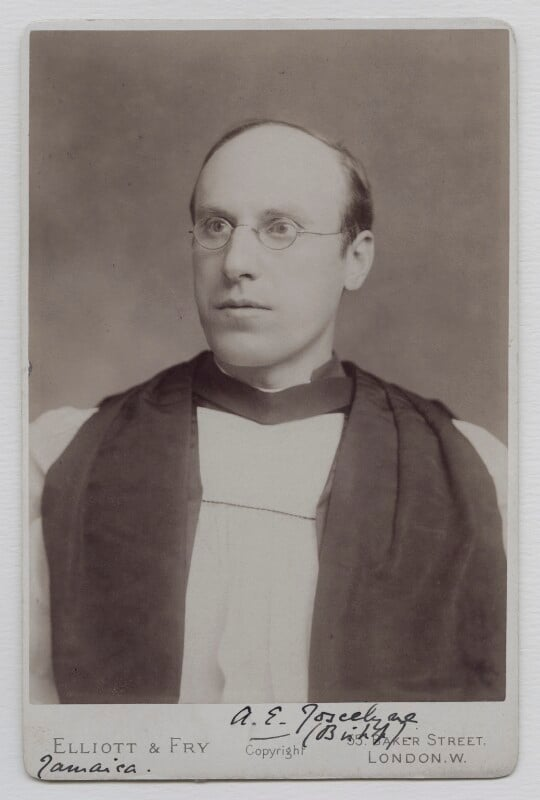
Joscelyne, c. 1910s

Albert Ernest Joscelyne (8 April 1866 – 3 May 1945) was an English Anglican clergyman who served as Bishop Coadjutor of Jamaica from 1905 to 1913.

== Life ==
Joscelyne was born in Chelmsford, Essex and educated at Merchant Taylors' School and Jesus College, Oxford. After his ordination, he was a curate at St George's-in-the-East, London for five years, then became vicar of St George's, Millom (1895–1903) and vicar of St Peter's Islington (1903–1905). He was Bishop Coadjutor of Jamaica (1905–1913), and then served as a priest in the Diocese of Salisbury, becoming Prebendary of Yatesbury and Archdeacon of Sherborne (1919–1941).

He died at Donhead St Mary on 3 May 1945 at the age of 79.
