= Frome Billet =

Coordinates: 50°42′33″N 2°23′30″W

Frome Billet is a former village in Dorset, located at the northern part of West Stafford.

It was first mentioned in the Domesday Book where it was recorded to have a slight archaeological evidence of a medieval settlement. It is currently represented by the Stafford House.
