= Edward Ward (footballer) =

English footballer (1895–1971)

Personal information
- Full name: Edward Ward
- Date of birth: 14 June 1895
- Place of birth: Whitehaven, Cumberland, England
- Date of death: 1971 (aged 75)
- Height: 5 ft 7 in (1.70 m)
- Position: Inside forward

Senior career*
Years	Team	Apps	(Gls)
- Blyth Spartans
1920–192?	Newcastle United	21	(5)
1922–1923	Crystal Palace	4	(0)
1923–1924	Nelson	2	(0)
1924–1925	Darlington	5	(0)
1925–1927	Ashington	26	(10)
- Workington
- West Stanley
- * Club domestic league appearances and goals

Edward Ward (14 June 1895 – 1971), also known as Ted or Ned Ward, was an English footballer who played as an inside forward in the Football League for Newcastle United, Crystal Palace, Nelson, Darlington and Ashington.

== Life and career ==
Ward was born in Whitehaven, (Note: Joyce's 2004 Football League Players' Records gives Cowpen as Ward's birthplace, but newspaper sources, including the one cited, make clear he was born in Whitehaven, and census returns show both the subject's birthplace and that the family moved from there to Cowpen when he was a child.) Cumberland, the fifth child of John Ward, a coal miner, and his wife Catherine. By the time of the 1911 census, the family had moved to Cowpen, Northumberland, and the five oldest sons, the 15-year-old Edward included, were all employed at the colliery.

He played football as an amateur for Blyth Spartans before joining Newcastle United at the end of the 1919–20 season. He played 25 matches for Newcastle during the 1920–21 season, 21 in the First Division and 4 in the FA Cup. According to the Derby Daily Telegraph, he was the smallest player in Newcastle's squad, "but his pluck and speed make him a dangerous inside right". He lost his place the following year, and moved on to Crystal Palace for a £250 fee. In December 1923, by which time the player had moved on again, to Nelson, Newcastle were obliged to solicit the Football League's assistance in extracting from Crystal Palace the £150 balance owing from the transfer; the League allowed the claim, and ordered the money be paid by 1 January.

Ward signed for Darlington in November 1924. He played five Third Division North matches, including a 2–1 win against Ashington in which he was involved in both goals. After Darlington secured promotion to the Second Division, Ward was not retained, so he signed for Ashington. He scored twice in his first match for the club, in a 3–3 draw at home to Wigan Borough, and over the next two seasons contributed 10 goals from 25 matches in the Third Division North. He finished his career with spells at two North-Eastern League clubs, Workington, where he was appointed captain, and West Stanley.

The 1939 Register lists him as a single man living with his brother John and sister Catherine in Blyth, Northumberland and occupied as a general labourer (heavy worker). Ward's death was registered in the Northumberland Central district, which included Blyth, Ashington, Bedlington and nearby villages, in the first quarter of 1971.
