= Edwin Ward =

Edwin James Greenfield Ward (26 October 1919 – 22 November 2005) was the longest-serving Chaplain to the Sovereign, from 1955 until his death. He was also Archdeacon of Sherborne from 1967 to 1984.

== Life ==
Ward was born in Australia on 26 October 1919, but his family soon returned to England and he was educated at St John's School, Leatherhead and Christ's College, Cambridge. Taking a commission with the King's Dragoon Guards at the outbreak of World War II, he was captured in 1940 and spent the rest of the war as a prisoner of war, mainly in northern Italy. After his release he returned to study at the theological college of Ridley Hall in Cambridge, and was ordained in 1948, becoming first a curate in East Dereham, Norfolk, then vicar of North Elmham, also in Norfolk, from 1950 to 1955.

In 1955, the Clerk of the Closet recommended Ward for appointment as one of the Chaplains to the Sovereign, part of the Ecclesiastical Household. He was Chaplain of the Royal Chapel in Windsor Great Park and was responsible for the Sunday services attended by the Queen, the Duke of Edinburgh and other members of the Royal Household. He also had pastoral responsibility for the 1,800 employees of the Windsor estate. According to Ward's obituary, his youth and his tact and diplomacy served him well at this post and he made many friends in royal circles. Since he continued to be a Royal Chaplain for the rest of his long life, he became the longest-serving holder of this position.

In 1963 he was admitted as a Lieutenant of the Royal Victorian Order, and in 1967 was appointed as Archdeacon of Sherborne and Rector of West Stafford in Dorset, holding both positions until his retirement at the end of 1984. Ward was also a canon and prebendary of Salisbury Cathedral, working there on several committees, notably one that dealt with the care of church buildings.

After his retirement he lived at Alresford in Hampshire until his death on 22 November 2005. His wife, Grizell, had died in 1985 and he was survived by three children; one of his daughters married John Wakeham, Baron Wakeham.

Church of England titles
Preceded by David Rokeby Maddock	Archdeacon of Sherborne; 1968–1984	Succeeded by John Keith Oliver
