= List of incinerators in the United Kingdom =

The following is a list of incinerators in the UK that treat municipal waste:

== Operating ==
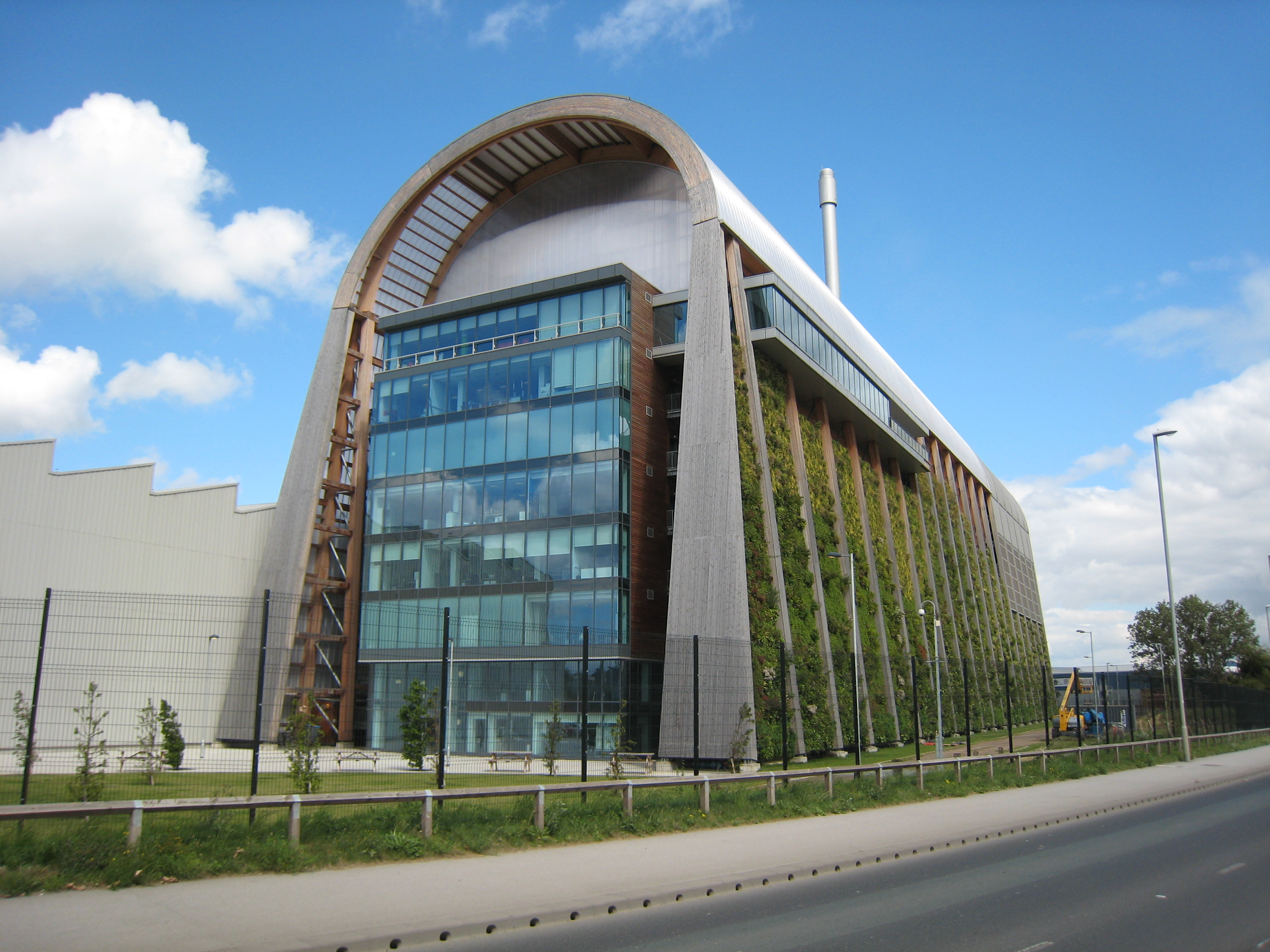
Leeds RERF

- NESS Energy Project, Aberdeen
- Allerton waste recovery park, North Yorkshire
- Allington Quarry Waste Management Facility
- Ardley ERF
- Baldovie WtE (Dundee)
- Beddington Energy Recovery Facility (Sutton, London)
- Bolton WtE
- Chineham EfW
- Cornwall Energy Recovery Centre
- Crossness STW Sludge Powered Generator (Belvedere, London)
- CSWDC (Coventry)
- Devonport Dockyard Incinerator
- Dudley EfW
- Eastcroft EfW (Nottingham)
- Exeter ERF
- Fawley Incinerator
- Ferrybridge Multifuel 1 (West Yorkshire)
- Ferrybridge Multifuel 2, (West Yorkshire)
- Glanford Power Station
- Gloucestershire EfW
- Great Blakenham
- Greatmoor EfW (Buckinghamshire)
- Hartlebury EfW
- Isle of Man Incinerator
- Isle of Wight gasification facility
- Kirklees EfW
- La Collette WtE (Jersey)
- Lakeside EfW (Colnbrook)
- Leeds RERF
- Lerwick Incinerator
- Lincoln ERF (Lincolnshire)
- London EcoPark (Edmonton, London)
- Marchwood ERF
- Millerhill Recycling and Energy Recovery Centre
- Milton Keynes Waste Recovery Park
- Newhaven ERF
- Newlincs EfW facility
- North Hykeham Incinerator
- Peterborough ERF
- Portsmouth ERF
- Red Moss Landfill
- Riverside Resource Recovery ERF (Belvedere, London)
- Runcorn EfW
- SELCHP (South Bermondsey, London)
- Sheffield ERF
- Shrewsbury Incinerator
- Staffordshire ERF (Four Ashes)
- Stoke EfW
- Teesside EfW
- Thetford Incinerator (Biomass)
- Tyseley Energy from Waste Plant
- Westfield Incinerator (Poultry litter)
- Westfield Energy Recovery Facility, Fife
- Wolverhampton EfW

== Under construction ==
- Avonmouth Resource Recovery Centre, Bristol
- Rookery South Energy Recovery Facility, Bedfordshire
- Portland Port, Dorset

== Decommissioned ==
- Bellozanne Incinerator
- Byker Incinerator
- Gateshead Incinerator
- Polmadie Incinerator
- Portrack Incinerator
- South Shields Incinerator
- Sunderland Incinerator
- Tynemouth Incinerator

== External lists ==
- UKWIN list of around 23 existing and 80 potential facilities
- Channel 4 News list of 30 incinerators being "seriously considered or planned by councils"
- Defra list of PFI projects (some include incineration)
- Environment Agency's Waste Incineration Spreadsheet (2006)
- Tradebe Fawley
