= Tadweer Group =

Emirati waste management company

- Industry: Waste Management
- Founded: 2008; 18 years ago
- Headquarters: Abu Dhabi, United Arab Emirates
- Parent: Abu Dhabi Developmental Holding Company
- Website: www.tadweer.ae

Tadweer Group is an Abu Dhabi-based waste management and recycling services company. Initially known as the Abu Dhabi Waste Management Company (Tadweer), Tadweer was rebranded following its acquisition by Abu Dhabi Developmental Holding Company (ADQ) in 2022.

== History ==
Tadweer was established in 2008, focusing on waste management. By 2011, fees on waste producers were imposed, and the company invested 6.6 billion AED in recycling. In 2012, it became a registered environmental service provider. In 2014 Tadweer hosted EcoWASTE event for the first time which later became annual. Tadweer was acquired by Abu Dhabi Developmental Holding Company in 2022, followed by the rebranding as Tadweer Group in 2024.

In 2020, the company implemented a National Sterilisation programme. Also in 2024, Tadweer Group acquired Enviroserve, a processing hub specializing in electronic waste recycling, expanding its operations to the Middle East, Africa, and Caucasus region.

In 2023, Tadweer and Ministry of Climate Change and Environment launched Waste to Zero global decarbonization initiative.

In 2024, the company together with Emirates Water and Electricity Company partnered with Japanese consortium that includes Marubeni Corporation, Hitachi Zosen Inova AG (HZI), and Japan Overseas Infrastructure Investment Corporation for Transport & Urban Development (JOIN) to develop an advanced waste-to-energy facility in Abu Dhabi with annual processing capacity of 900,000 tonnes of waste.

Also in 2024, it started developing a Material Recovery Facility for recovering and capturing valuable recyclable material from municipal solid waste.

== Activities ==
Tadweer Group is a part of ADQ's Energy & Utilities portfolio. It focuses on developing sustainable waste management practices. In addition to its operations in Abu Dhabi, Tadweer Group collaborates with organizations on waste management worldwide.

== Notes and references ==
- Official website
