= Stefaan Simons =

Stefaan J. R. Simons is a chemical engineer and senior academic employed by the University College London. In 2012, he was appointed Director of the International Energy Policy Institute (IEPI) and the inaugural BHP Billiton Chair of Energy Policy at UCL Australia. Prior to moving to Australia, Simons established the School of Engineering at Nazarbayev University in Kazakhstan-– the world's largest producer of uranium. Simons' work has been published in over 200 journals, books and conference proceedings.

== Education ==
Simons has a Science degree with honours from the University of Surrey (1986) and a PhD from the University of Manchester Institute of Science and Technology.

== Career ==
Simons' chemical engineering career has focused on particle technology applications for the mineral resources and pharmaceutical sectors. Simons was awarded a Royal Academy of Engineering Global Research Fellowship to further the development of low-carbon technologies and processes for energy and chemical industries. His fellowship was undertaken at the University of California, Berkeley (2009) and the University of Melbourne (2010).

Simons has worked with universities in Kazakhstan and Russia since 1994, developing chemical engineering degree curricula there. He spent three years establishing the School of Engineering at Nazarbayev University in Astana, Kazakhstan’s capital city. The university is a strategic partner of the University College London.

In August 2012, Simons moved from Astana to Adelaide, South Australia to assume his dual roles at the International Energy Policy Institute.

=== Carbon8 Systems ===
Simons is also the Director of Engineering at Carbon8 Systems, a British company which was created in 2006 to commercialize "accelerated carbonation" processes for waste treatment. The processes were developed by researchers working at UCL and the University of Greenwich. The process is applicable to the incineration of municipal garbage, an activity becoming increasingly common in Europe and responsible for the production of hazardous fly ash. Carbon8's accelerated carbonation processes make the byproduct of garbage incineration cheaper to dispose of and can also produce aggregates which can then be used as construction materials. Carbon8 claims to have produced the world's first commercially available carbon negative aggregates. In 2012, the University of Greenwich said that the processes also had potential use in the management of nuclear wastes. Commercial prospects for accelerated carbonation attracted the interest of Grundon Waste Management, which has since invested millions of pounds in the establishment of a new company called Carbon8 Aggregates.

The first commercial Carbon8 facility treated wastes from Grundon's energy-from-waste plant at Colnbrook. The Colnbrook incinerator first began incinerating garbage in 1990 and low-level radioactive waste in 2010. A doubling of infant mortality rates in the nearby town of Slough was recorded between 2010 and 2012. The increased mortality ran counter to the national trend (one of steady, gradual improvement) and prompted speculation that the incineration could be linked to the change.

== Nuclear industrial advocacy ==
Since his appointment at UCL Australia, Simons has posed the questions: What would it take to establish a nuclear submarine capability in Australia? Is it time for nuclear energy for Australia? and has advocated for nuclear power in Australia.
