= Carbon8 Aggregates =

Carbon8 Aggregates Ltd is a British company which applies patented "accelerated carbonation technology" to solidify waste residues produced by the incineration of garbage. Carbon8's accelerated carbonation processes make the wastes of garbage incineration cheaper to dispose of and produce aggregates which can then be used as construction materials. Carbon8 aggregates claim to be the world's first carbon negative aggregates. In 2012, the University of Greenwich said that the processes commercialised by Carbon8 Aggregates and its affiliate Carbon8 Systems also had potential use in the management of nuclear wastes. As of 2015, Carbon8 Aggregates are producing aggregates at a facility in Brandon, Suffolk and another facility at Avonmouth near Bristol is under construction.

== History ==
Accelerated Carbonation Technology (ACT) was first developed by researchers working at UCL and the University of Greenwich. Research into the use of ACT in the treatment of municipal solid waste was received in 2002 and augmented with further industrial funding. Dr Colin Hills, Director of the Centre for Contaminated Land Remediation at the University of Greenwich' was responsible for patenting Accelerated Carbonation Technology (ACT). In 2006 the company Carbon8 Systems Ltd was created to commercialise the processes for waste treatment applications with the University of Greenwich retaining a "significant" stake in the new company. Hills became the Technical Director of Carbon8 Systems and chemical engineer Stefaan Simons became the company's Director of Engineering. Paula Carey became its Managing Director in 2007.

The commercial prospects of ACT attracted the interest of Grundon Waste Management, which subsequently invested millions of pounds in the establishment of a new company, Carbon8 Aggregates Ltd. The company was founded in May 2010 and the first location to commercially utilise Carbon8 technology was Grundon's energy-from-waste plant at Colnbrook.

In 2012, an accelerated carbonation plant was commissioned in Brandon, Suffolk, beside Lignacite's masonry plant. A partnership between Carbon8 Aggregates Ltd and Lignacite Ltd resulted in the development of the Carbon Buster building block. The block was claimed by its inventors to be the first carbon-negative building material of its kind. In 2014, a second line was added to the plant, to meet increasing demand. The plant in Brandon receives flue gas treatment (FGT) residues from the Colnbrook incinerator to process into Carbon Buster blocks.

Another Carbon8 Aggregates (C8A) plant was approved for construction at Avondale near Bristol in January 2015.
