= SITA (waste management company) =

SITA (originally Société Industrielle de Transport Automobile) is the main brand representing Suez's waste subsidiaries in Europe, North America, the Asia Pacific zone and Australia.

Following the merger of the original Suez and Gaz de France in 2008, Suez Environnement (now Suez) became a listed group on the New York Stock Exchange, Brussels Stock Exchange and the Paris Stock Exchange. SITA is a significant part of the Suez business, which now as a waste management and water treatment specialist is fully focused on sustainable development.

It owns, operates or has submitted planning applications for a number of incineration and In-vessel composting plants. Sita's services include business and residential waste disposal, street cleansing, landfill engineering, civic amenity site management and energy from waste.

== History ==
SITA was created in 1918 to modernise domestic waste collection in Paris and to cope with the rapid rise in the volume of domestic waste generated by Parisians.

SITA was taken over by Société Lyonnaise des Eaux et de l'Éclairage in 1971 and became a part of La Compagnie de SUEZ. The aim of the acquisition was to allow SITA to respond to the changes taking place in the market at the time.

New facilities were built to better manage the landfill process and to allow SITA to incinerate domestic waste. New markets were developed with local authorities, such as selective glass collection schemes and the collection and treatment of clinical waste from hospitals.

In 1997, La Compagnie de Suez and Lyonnaise des Eaux merged to form the new group, Suez Lyonnaise des Eaux and later Suez Environnement was created. Following the merger, the group gradually began to focus on two main areas: energy and environment developing new technologies for the treatment of waste, recycling and the production of renewable energy.

== Hong Kong division ==
SITA Waste Services Limited holds the aftercare contracts for seven closed Hong Kong landfills, namely: Tseung Kwan O Phase I, Tseung Kwan O Phase II & III, Gin Drinkers' Bay, Ngau Tam Mei, Siu Lang Shui, Ma Tso Lung, and Pillar Point Valley. They also manage two operating landfills, the North East New Territories Landfill (NENT) and the West New Territories Landfill (WENT), as well as various refuse transfer stations around the territory. The company was formerly known as Swire SITA Waste Services Limited. Swire sold its interest in 2008 and the company name was changed to its present form in 2009.

In 2012 two former directors of Swire SITA were jailed for bribing Macao's former secretary for transport and public works Ao Man Long. The sentencing judge said that to some extent the pair were "victims" as it was Ao who initiated the bribe.

A 2016 investigation by Hong Kong's Environmental Protection Department (EPD) found that SITA failed to meet their contractual obligation to maintain a minimum temperature of 1,000 °C for the flaring of landfill gas in the leachate treatment plant at the closed Pillar Point Valley Landfill, in an attempt to save fuel expenditure. As a result, up to 800 tonnes of polluted water (landfill leachate) was discharged into the sea per day from November 2015 to January 2016. The EPD consequently deducted HK$200,000 from the monthly payment to SITA. The EPD also set up a special investigation team to look into alleged malpractice by SITA. By mid-November 2016, the department had deducted a total of $3.3 million from the contract payments to SITA on the grounds that the leachate treatment plant failed to meet standards.

Late in 2016 the EPD once again prosecuted SITA under the Water Pollution Control Ordinance. The department found that, from May to June 2016, SITA repeatedly exceeded the polluted water discharge limit specified in the licence. The EPD prosecuted SITA under 16 offences of the Water Pollution Control (General) Regulations.

In May 2017, SITA was convicted in the Fanling Magistrates’ Courts of 20 offences and fined $200,000. The EPD deducted $5.5 million in operation payments to SITA for the Pillar Point contract.

== See also ==
- Isle of Man Incinerator
- Kirklees Incinerator
