= HZI =

HZI can refer to:

- Hitachi Zosen Inova, a Swiss company that turns waste into energy
- Helmholtz Centre for Infection Research, a biomedical research institute in Braunschweig, Germany
- Horqin Left Rear Banner, a subregion of Inner Mongolia, China; see List of administrative divisions of Inner Mongolia
