= Newlincs EfW facility =

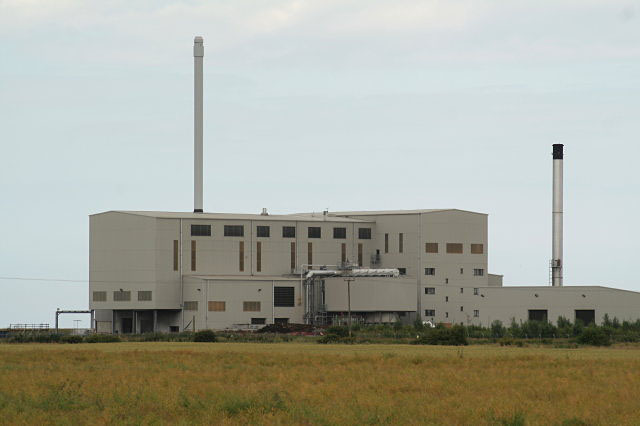
- NewLincs EfW facility in 2008
- Official name: NewLincs EfW facility
- Country: England
- Location: Lincolnshire, Yorkshire and the Humber
- Coordinates: 53.6063°N 0.1439°W
- Commission date: 2004
- Operator: NewLincs Developments Ltd

Thermal power station
- Primary fuel: Waste

External links
- Commons: Related media on Commons

The Newlincs EfW facility is an energy from waste facility which is located in Grimsby, North East Lincolnshire, England. The plant is operated by Cyclerval UK & TIRU Group under a PFI contract. The engineering of the facility is unusual as it consists of an oscillating kiln handling 56,000 tonnes of waste per year/7 tonnes per hour of waste. The facility is capable of generating 3.2 MW electricity.

== See also ==
- List of incinerators in the UK
