= Gloucestershire Energy from Waste facility =

Waste-to-energy power station in Gloucestershire, England

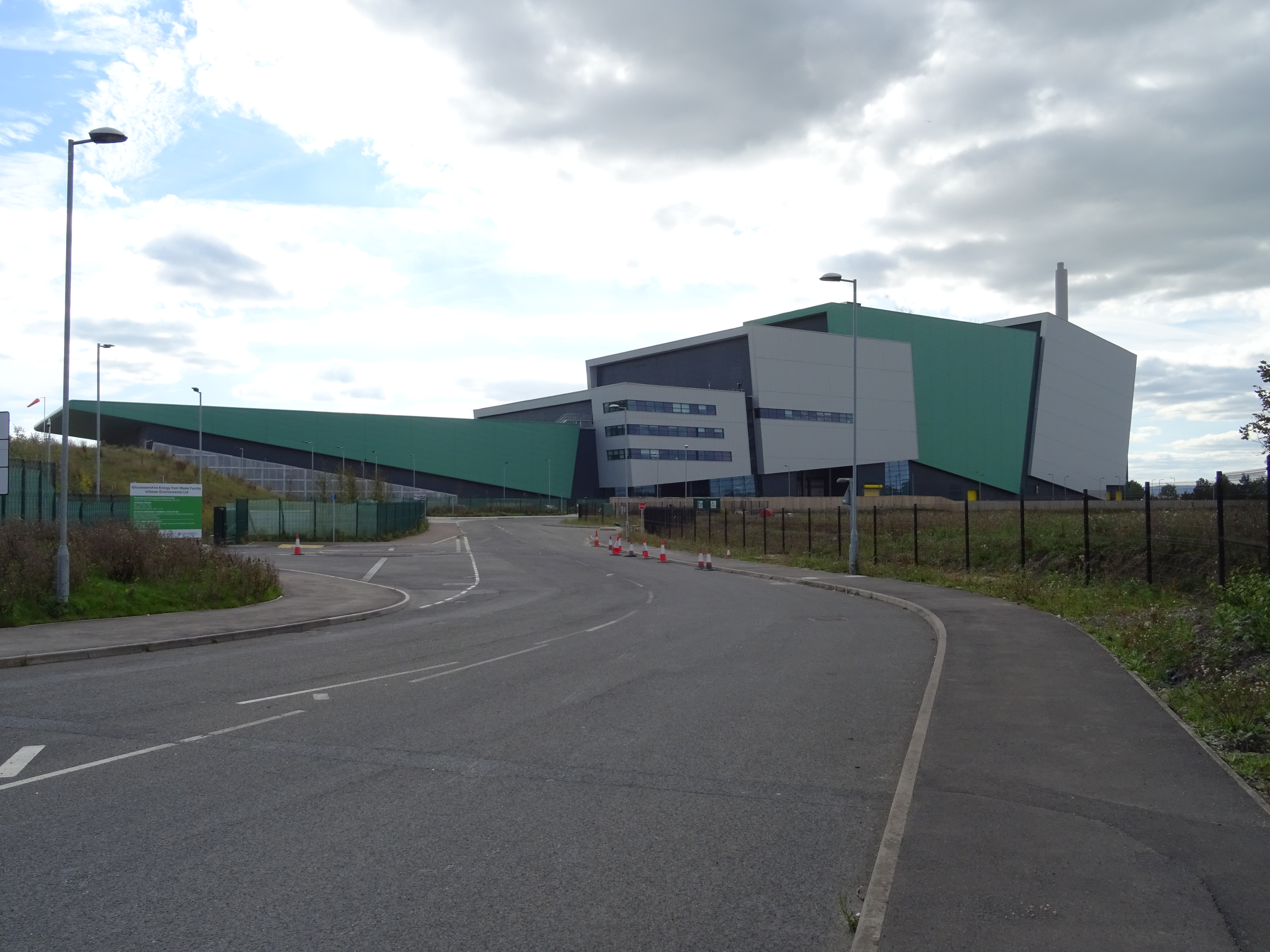
- Entrance to the facility
- Country: England
- Location: near Stonehouse, Gloucestershire
- Coordinates: 51°47′27.9″N 2°17′28.4″W
- Status: Operational
- Construction began: August 2016
- Construction cost: £633 million
- Owner: FCC Environment UK
- Operator: FCC Environment UK
- Employees: ~40

Thermal power station
- Primary fuel: Waste
- Site area: 9,200 m^{2} (99,000 sq ft)
- Chimneys: 1

Power generation
- Units operational: 1 x 17.4 MW
- Nameplate capacity: 14.5 MW
- Annual net output: 116,000 MWh

External links
- Website: https://gloucestershireefw.co.uk/

Gloucestershire Energy from Waste facility, also known as the Javelin Park Incinerator, is an incinerator and energy-from-waste power station which produces 14.5MW of power for the National Grid, by burning up to 190,000 tonnes of residual waste each year. The site is located adjacent to the M5 motorway, near junction 12 and to the south of Gloucester.

== History ==
Gloucestershire County Council bought the land for a waste plant at Javelin Park in 2009 for £7.4 million.

In March 2011, contractors Complete Circle and Urbaser with Balfour Beatty were invited to refine their proposals for the incinerator and in December 2011 Gloucestershire County Council awarded a consortium of Urbaser and Balfour Beatty (UBB) the 25-year contract, which is set to end in 2044.

Planning permission was submitted in September 2012, however against the recommendation to accept the proposal by the authority's planning committee, it was rejected in March 2013 by the county council over concerns of its impact on the surrounding landscape. Javier Peiro, a director of UBB said the decision was "very disappointing on many levels". UBB appealed the decision and after a public inquiry, the project was approved in January 2015. Former Communities Secretary Eric Pickles delayed announcing his ruling three times on whether the project would be going ahead and Liberal Democrat councillor Jeremy Hilton, described the failures to make a decision as a "disgrace".

In June 2018, the Information Commissioner's Office ruled that Gloucestershire County Council must publish commercially sensitive parts of a previously redacted report on the project due to Freedom of Information Act rules. Campaigners had requested information such as the price per tonne of waste processed and the electrical cost for third parties, to be able to assess whether the project was value for money. The details were released on 21 December 2018, revealing a cost of £112.47 per tonne of waste burnt.

In August 2016, construction began on the Javelin Park site, on part of the former RAF Moreton Valence Airfield. Construction was completed in June 2019, with the facility beginning its commissioning process and receiving its first waste as part of testing. This was completed in October and the site became fully operational in January 2020.

Balfour Beatty sold its 49.5% share of the facility in December 2023, resulting in the facility being owned outright by Urbaser. With the FCC Servicios Medio Ambiente purchase of Urbaser’s UK affiliate in June 2024, operation of the plant transferred to FCC Environment UK.

== Operations ==
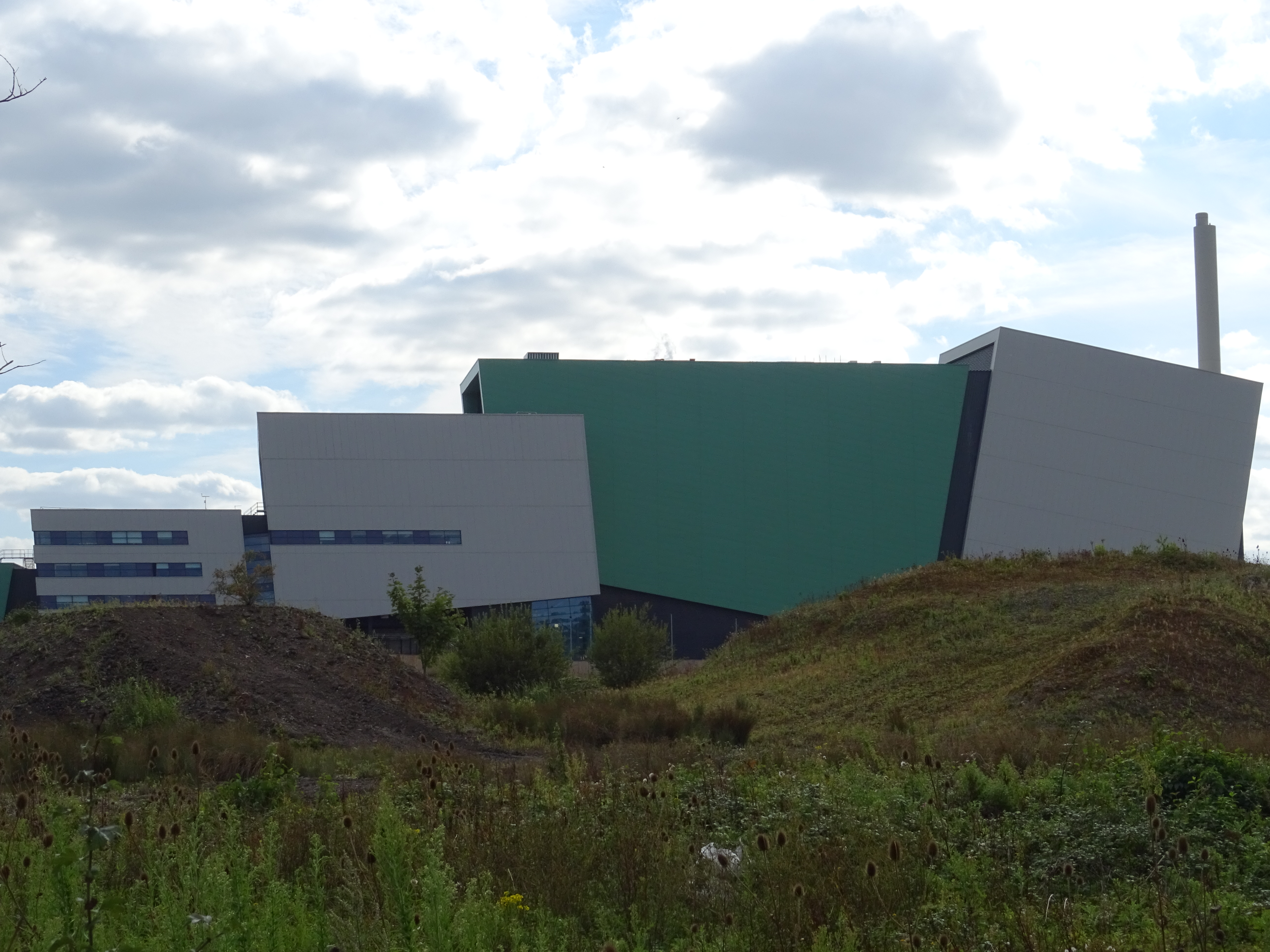
Side view

The Gloucestershire Energy from Waste facility processes all the residual household waste generated in Gloucestershire, making the county self-sufficient for waste treatment capacity. The facility also processes certain deliveries of non-hazardous third party waste from commercial sources. Approximately 104 HGVs deliver 500 tonnes of waste each day.

Upon arrival at the facility, waste is deposited into a bunker capable of storing 11 days' worth of waste collections. The waste is then loaded into a feed hopper by overhead cranes and dispensed onto a moving grate which transfers waste to the burning zone. Oil burners are used to preheat the grate chamber to a minimum of 850 °C to allow waste combustion to begin and continue unaided. The air for this combustion process is drawn in through the waste reception hall and bunker to contain odours within the facility and is preheated by a heat exchanger using hot steam which has already passed through the steam turbine. Heat is released in combustion, creating steam in the boiler which is converted into electrical energy by the turbine.

Electricity is produced at 11kV by the electric generator, which is connected via a gearbox to the steam turbine which spins at 5,000 rpm. The voltage is then stepped up to 33kV by an on-site transformer, before being exported to the National Grid. In total, up to 190,000 tonnes of waste are burnt each year to produce 116,000 MWh annually, enough to power around 25,000 homes. The facility is a CHP Plant so has the capability to supply hot water or lowly pressurised steam for use in heating nearby buildings.

The site has a visitor centre used for educational groups to learn about waste management and resource use. Additionally it hosts site tours and various events.

== Waste management ==
The gaseous products of combustion are managed with a filtration and cleansing system to ensure that flue gas emissions comply with regulations. Emissions firstly undergo a chemical dosing to remove contaminants, and secondly a baghouse filter to remove large particulates and dust contained in the flue gases. This process produces waste residues consisting primarily of lime and carbon (which are used to clean the flue gas before it is released into the atmosphere). These waste residues are collected and transported off-site to waste management operator Augean, treating them before disposal at landfill.

The facility produces approximately 40,000 tonnes of incinerator bottom ash (IBA) per year, consisting mainly of brick rubble and soils, clinker, glass, ceramics and metals. The IBA produced at the facility is cooled with water before being processed to recover ferrous and non-ferrous metals. Approximately 3,000 tonnes of metal are recycled from the IBA per year. The remaining material is then graded so it can be recycled as an aggregate in construction, such as in the subbase of roads. This process diverts 92% of waste from landfill.

== Controversies ==
The Gloucestershire Energy from Waste facility faced "fierce opposition" while the project was both being planned and constructed, including from Stroud District Council. Concerns were raised over the cost and carbon dioxide emissions of the project, as well as whether it would discourage residents to recycle.

=== Local opposition ===
More than 5,000 people signed a petition in 2010 opposing the plant.

In October 2012, protesters wearing protective suits and gas masks gathered outside a council office, and then in March 2013 over 100 people protested at the proposed construction site. Objections included the impact on the environment, human health, and the size and location of the plant.

In January 2015, hundreds of protesters gathered in Stroud, concerned over the potential impact on the environment, as well as the size and cost. David Drew, Stroud's Labour candidate said he thought the incinerator was the "wrong decision".

In June 2017, protesters stormed and graffitied Gloucester Shire Hall, demanding construction work was halted.

Protesters blocked the entrance to the construction site in August 2017 and again in January 2019, when they also held up traffic.

=== Legal challenges ===
Stroud District Council had consistently opposed the planned facility and in February 2015 launched a legal challenge against the government's decision to approve the plans, describing it as their "only option" left. Balfour Beatty said it would cooperate fully, but was "disappointed" with the legal action. The High Court rejected the legal challenge in July of that year.

In April 2017, the environmental group Community R4C filed a complaint with the Competition and Markets Authority, claiming the project did not provide value for money. Community R4C took Gloucestershire County Council to the High Court in March 2020, claiming the contract was awarded to UBB unlawfully. The group said that they "would have bid for the contract" and had been working on an alternative waste processing plant which was "much cheaper". Gloucestershire County Council disagreed, stating its actions were completely lawful. In July, the High Court ruled that Community R4C was not qualified to bid for the contract.
