= The Landscape and Biodiversity Research Group =

The Landscape and Biodiversity Research Group (LBRG) in the School of Science and Technology at The University of Northampton carries out fundamental and applied research in the area of landscape ecology and its relationship to biodiversity and the ecology of species interactions. Research is mainly focussed on the effects of habitat modification and fragmentation on species' autecologies, seed dispersal, pollinator behaviour and plant reproductive success, and species richness. Research involves species- and community-level studies of ecology and conservation.

The LBRG currently consists of three permanent academic staff (Dr Jeff Ollerton, Dr Janet Jackson and Dr Duncan McCollin), postdoctoral researchers who are affiliated to the group either directly or as alumni (including Dr Jolyon Alderman, visiting research fellow), and postgraduate research students. In addition, the group has ongoing research collaborations with colleagues at a number of UK and international universities and research centres.

The main research themes of the LBRG are:

- Hedgerow biodiversity
- Landscape fragmentation and modelling
- The ecology, evolution and conservation of plant-pollinator interactions
- Pollinators and landscape structure
- River and floodplain management

Research has been funded by a range of organisations, including: NERC, BBSRC, The Royal Society, The Leverhulme Trust, The British Ecological Society, The Biodiversity Trust, The Royal Entomological Society, South Northamptonshire Council, Friends of the Upper Nene (FUN), The University of Northampton, English Partnerships, SITA Environmental Trust (in collaboration with the SITA Centre for Sustainable Wastes Management) and the Finnis Scott Foundation.
