= Newhaven ERF =

Waste-to-energy plant in East Sussex, England

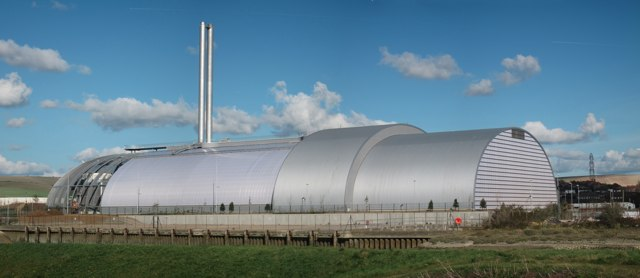
- Newhaven ERF in 2011
- Official name: Newhaven Energy Recovery Facility
- Country: England
- Location: Newhaven, East Sussex
- Coordinates: 50.8016°N 0.0493°E
- Status: Commissioned
- Construction began: 2008
- Operator: Veolia Environmental Services

Thermal power station
- Primary fuel: Waste

Power generation
- Nameplate capacity: 19 MW

External links
- Website: www.southdowns.veolia.co.uk/facilities/newhaven-energy-recovery-facility

The Newhaven ERF (Energy Recovery Facility) is an incinerator, in the town of Newhaven in the English county of East Sussex, for the treatment of up to 210,000 tonnes per annum of the county's municipal solid waste. The facility, built by Veolia Environmental Services, was approved by planners at the Conservative-controlled East Sussex County Council.

The facility treats household waste that cannot be reused, composted or recycled and generates electricity from it. The electricity produced is sold to the National Grid and is enough to supply 25,000 homes. 88 tonnes of steam are produced per hour which is used to turn the generator and create electricity; the steam is cooled back into water and reused in a closed loop system.

== Construction ==
Construction of the facility began in April 2008 and was completed in late 2011. The facility became operational in 2012. The building itself is 24 m (79 ft) tall, but the chimneys are 65 m (213 ft) tall. It is the first of its kind to be built in the South Downs area and cost around £175 million to complete, including a unique ‘floating caisson’ which was used to house 20 metres of the plant underground and reduce the proposed height to meet planning requirements.

== See also ==
- List of incinerators in the United Kingdom
