= Marchwood Power Station =

Gas-fired power station near Southampton, England

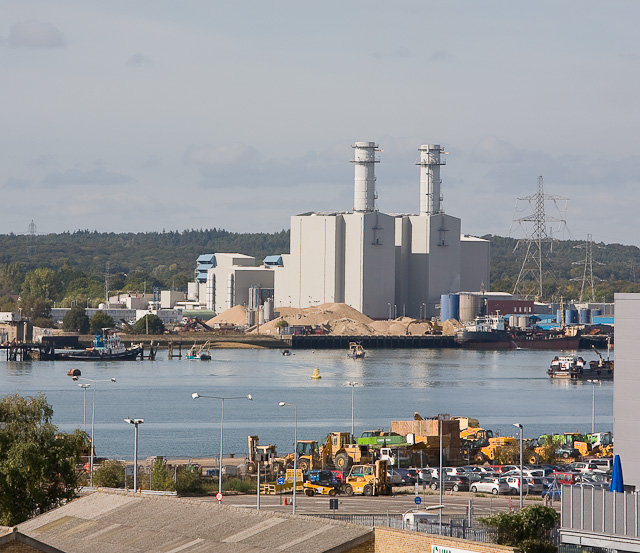
- Marchwood Power Station seen across the River Test
- Country: England
- Location: Hampshire, South East England
- Coordinates: 50.897581°N 1.438988°W
- Status: operational
- Construction began: 2006
- Commission date: 2010
- Construction cost: CCGT: £380 million
- Owner: 50% SSE plc / 50% MEAG
- Operator: Marchwood Power Limited
- Employees: CCGT: 45

Thermal power station
- Primary fuel: Oil: fuel oil; CCGT: Gas-fired
- Chimneys: Oil: 2, CCGT: 2
- Cooling towers: None
- Cooling source: Seawater

Power generation
- Units operational: Oil: 8 ×60 MW, CCGT: 898 MW
- Nameplate capacity: 898 MW

External links
- Website: https://www.marchwoodpower.com/
- Commons: Related media on Commons

Marchwood Power Station is an 898.1 MW gas-fired power station in Marchwood, near Southampton, England. It is situated beside estuary of the River Test where it meets Southampton Water, opposite the Port of Southampton. It is built on the site of an oil-fired power station, demolished in the 1990s. The station is operated by the Marchwood Power Limited Independent Team.

== Overview ==
Marchwood Power Station is next to Southampton Water on Marchwood Industrial Estate. It is a combined cycle gas turbine (CCGT) power station. The plant uses compressed air and gas to power one turbine and then uses exhaust gases from that process to boil water and power a steam turbine. The power station generates 898.1MW of electricity. Water from the River Test is used as part of the cooling process. Around 45 people work at the power plant.

== History ==
=== Oil-fired plant ===
The first power plant at Marchwood was built in the 1950s. It was originally designed to be a coal-fired plant. Plans were changed when the station was at an advanced stage of construction and it was equipped also for burning fuel-oil. Coal would be delivered by boat to a purpose built jetty which could also receive tankers from Fawley Refinery seven miles lower down Southampton Water. It was also fed from the refinery by an 11.3 km pipeline which delivered oil to four storage tanks holding 26,000 tonnes. The station was authorised in August 1951, construction began in 1952 and the first foundation stone was laid in September 1954.

It contained eight John Thompson boilers delivering 592.0 kg/s of steam at 62.1 bar and 482 °C. The first four units were fully commissioned in 1957, with the remaining four units on stream by 1958. When it was running on oil it also required additional steam from three John Thompson boilers delivering 30,000 lb/hr saturated steam to provide trace heating to the pipe system and storage tanks to lower the viscosity of the fuel oil.

The first generating set started producing electricity in December 1955. This was followed by the second set in March 1956, then further sets in August 1956, December 1956, March 1957, September 1958 and December 1958. The power station eventually comprised eight English Electric 60MW units with a combined power of 480MW.

The electricity output of the station was:

Marchwood electricity capacity and output
| Year | 1957 | 1958 | 1960 | 1961 | 1962 | 1963 | 1967 | 1972 | 1979 | 1981 | 1982 |
|---|---|---|---|---|---|---|---|---|---|---|---|
| Output capacity MW | 280 | 280 | 466 | 466 | 466 | 466 | 466 | 466 | 480 | 454 | 454 |
| Output GWh | 483.359 | 1763.333 | 3577.7 | 3544.8 | 3307.5 | 3431.5 | 3107.8 | 2473.082 | 559.767 | 59.864 | 21.024 |

Annual output of Marchwood power station, GWh

In the year 1980–81 the thermal efficiency was 20.77 per cent. Marchwood power station was closed in 1983.

=== Marchwood Engineering Laboratories ===
Beginning in the early 1960s, a site next to the power station was the home of Marchwood Engineering Laboratories operated by the Central Electricity Generating Board. It was one of their three national research laboratories. The centre developed a broad-based research programme concentrating on structural, combustion and mechanical engineering, and included techniques, design codes, instrumentation and machines for welding, nuclear reactor inspection, turbines and other plant. A low-speed wind tunnel, built to study power station emissions, was also built there. Following privatisation of the electricity industry, Marchwood Engineering Laboratories were allocated to PowerGen, but that company was engaged in comparatively little research, and the rundown and closure of the site were announced in 1989.

==== Alternative energy projects ====
In 1979 a geothermal test well was sunk at Marchwood Power Station in the UK's first project to tap geothermal heat. Drilling was completed to a depth of 2600 metres in early 1981. This revealed an aquifer at a temperature of 73 Celsius at a depth of 1660 metres. Although the Department of Energy considered the resource to be uneconomic, a similar borehole sunk nearby in Southampton was later utilised to provide local heating in the city.

In 1983 Marchwood Power Station was the site of the UK's first commercial solar-powered electricity generator, when a 30 kW system was built by BP Solar in the defunct coalyard of the power station. It was decommissioned a few years later.

=== Gas-fired plant ===
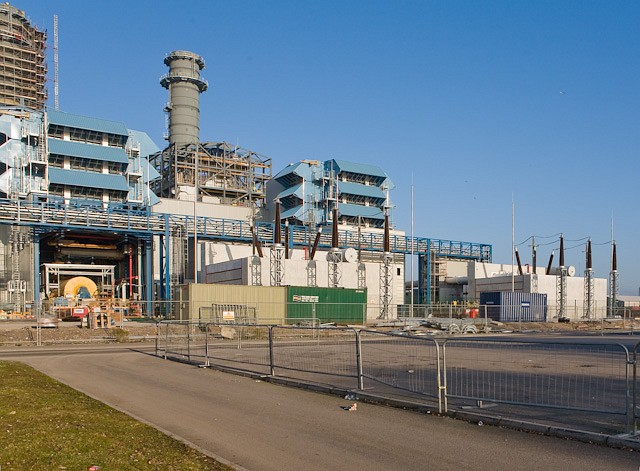
Gas-fired plant under construction in 2009

The gas-fired plant was built by Marchwood Power Ltd, a joint venture between SSE and ESB International. The power station cost £380 million and was officially opened on 28 January 2010. In 2013 ESB sold off its 50% stake in Marchwood for €180 million to a unit of the reinsurance company Munich Re.

== See also ==
- Marchwood Incinerator
