= Kirklees EfW =

Major English incineration plant

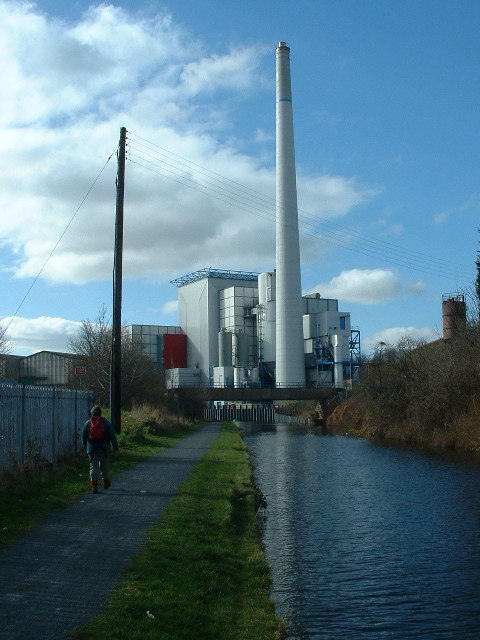
- Kirklees EfW
- Kirklees EfW shown within West Yorkshire
- Country: England
- Location: Huddersfield
- Coordinates: 53.657°N 1.777°W
- Status: Operational
- Commission date: 2002
- Owner: Suez Recycling and Recovery UK

Thermal power station
- Primary fuel: Waste
- Thermal capacity: 9.5 MW

External links
- Commons: Related media on Commons

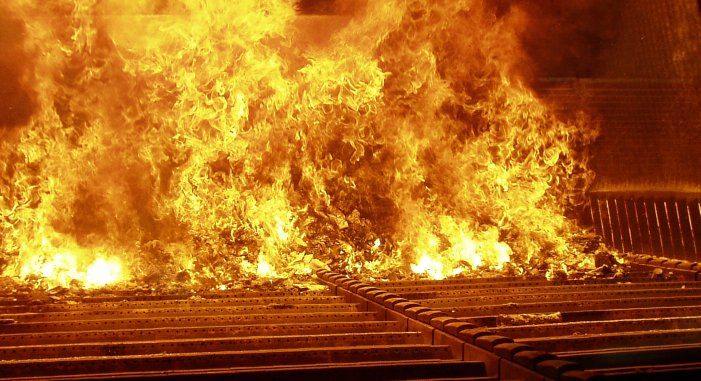
Moving Grate Furnace

The Kirklees EfW is a major moving grate incineration plant in Huddersfield, Kirklees, England. The incinerator is owned and operated by Suez Recycling and Recovery UK who signed a 25-year contract with Kirklees Council in 1998 with an option to increase the time period to 2028. The plant is integral to the waste strategy and Unitary Development plan of Kirklees Council, treating 150,000 tonnes (170,000 tons) of locally generated municipal waste, which when incinerated, will produce enough electricity to power 15,000 homes. Only 136,000 tonnes (150,000 tons) of waste is actually incinerated, the other tonnages permitted are recovered materials such as metals (for recycling) and Incinerator bottom ash (IBA) and Fly ash.

The incinerator has been operational since 2002 and was one of the first waste projects financed by PFI in the United Kingdom. The plant, which employs 29 staff and operates 24 hours a day, cost £35 million.

== See also ==
- Isle of Man Incinerator
