= Marchwood =

Village and parish in Hampshire, England

Coordinates: 50.890°N 1.454°W

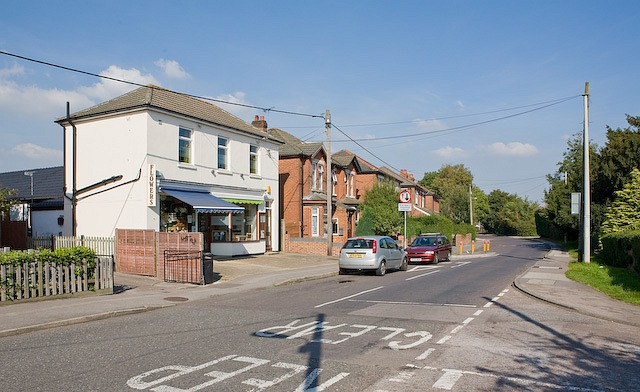
- Main Road, Marchwood

- Location within Hampshire
- Population: 5,586; 6,141 (2011 Census)
- OS grid reference: SU385102
- Civil parish: Marchwood
- District: New Forest
- Shire county: Hampshire
- Region: South East
- Country: England
- Sovereign state: United Kingdom
- Post town: SOUTHAMPTON
- Postcode district: SO40
- Dialling code: 023
- Police: Hampshire and Isle of Wight
- Fire: Hampshire and Isle of Wight
- Ambulance: South Central
- UK Parliament: New Forest East

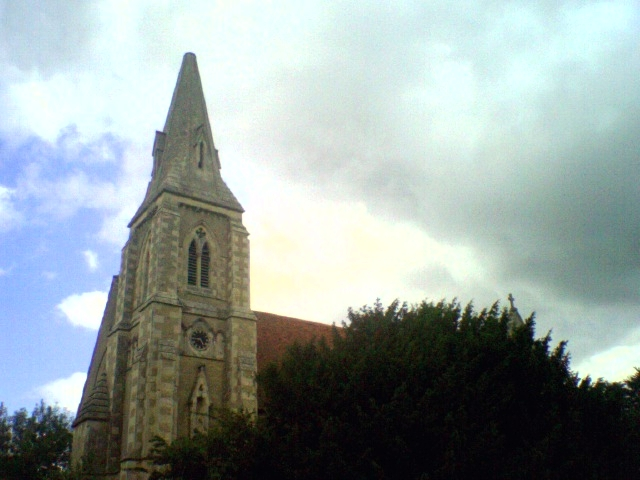
St. John's church, Marchwood

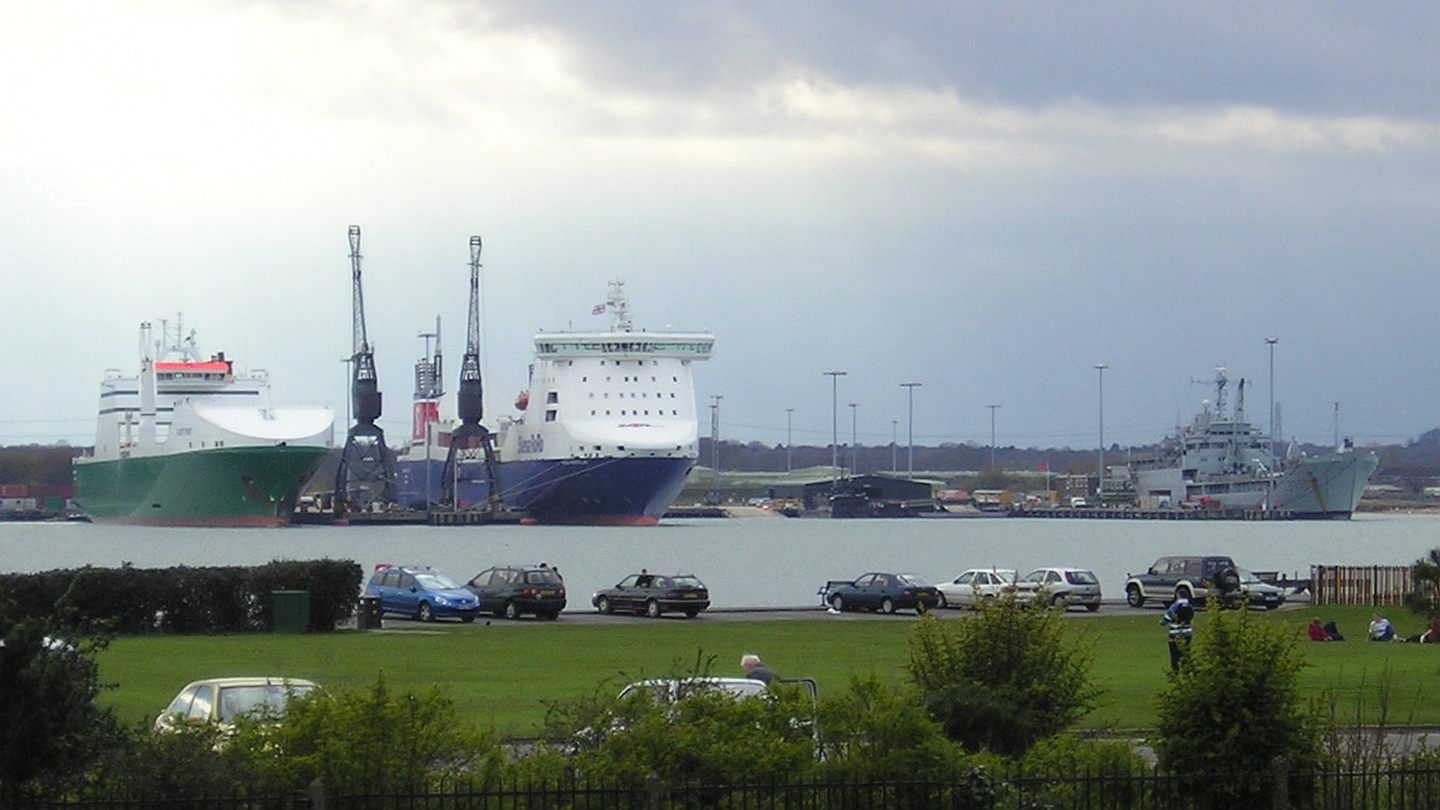
Marchwood military port in 2004 viewed from Southampton

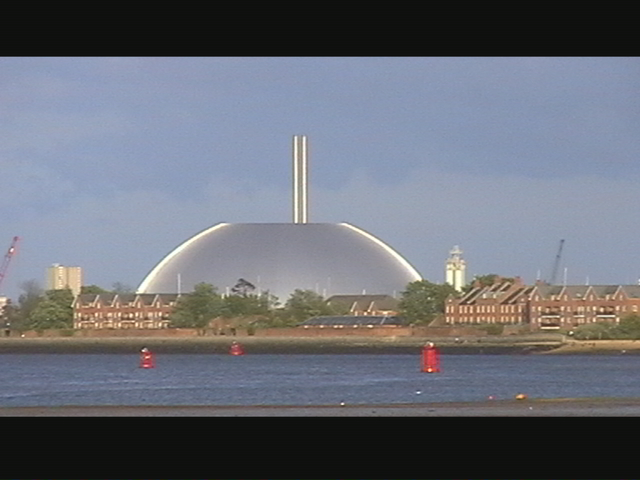
Marchwood incinerator dome

Marchwood is a village and civil parish located in Hampshire, England. It lies between Totton and Hythe on the eastern edge of the New Forest. The population of the village in the 2011 census was 6,141.

== History ==
Marchwood has seen human activity since Roman times. The Roman road from the Calshot/Lepe area passed through here on its way to Nursling (Onna as it was called). Roman coins have been found at Bury Farm.

The name "Marchwood" is most probably from the Old English "merecewudu" meaning "smallage wood" ("smallage" is a term for wild celery). It is mentioned in the Domesday Book of 1086 as "Merceode", when the manor was held by Alwin, whose father Wulfgeat held the manor before 1066.

The manor of Marchwood eventually became known as Marchwood Romsey. John de Romsey held the vill of Marchwood in 1316. He was succeeded by Sir Walter Romsey of Rockbourne, who died in 1403–4 holding land in Marchwood. The manor then passed in the same way as the manor of Romsey Horseys, until the death of Thomas Horsey in 1477.

John Romsey of Tatchbury died in 1494 holding the manor from John Horsey, as did his son, another John Romsey who died in 1503. His son William Romsey sold the manor to Henry White. The manor passed from Robert White to his son William in 1564–5. In 1587 William White sold the manor to Nicholas Venables. William Rickman died in possession of the manor in 1599, leaving his daughter Katherine wife of David Urry his heir. A hundred years later, David Urry, described as of St. James, Westminster, sold the manor to Gilbert Serle of Leghorn, and it subsequently passed to Sir William Oglander. The manor afterwards passed into the Saunders family.

One other manor close to Marchwood was called Bury (also Newton Bury). It occurs in a deed of the 13th century as the "manor of Eling called Burylond." In the 16th century it was absorbed into Colbury manor, and it is now represented by Bury Farm just north of Marchwood.

Marchwood was at one time in the parish of Eling, and is situated in that part of the ancient parish which lies low at the mouth of the River Test, southeast of Eling village. Cracknore, in Marchwood, was the landing place of the ferry from Southampton long before the Hythe Ferry. There was an important beacon site here at Beacon Hill, receiving and sending messages to both ends of the Isle of Wight. Marchwood became a separate ecclesiastical parish in 1843, and a civil parish in 1894. The church was built and endowed by Horatio Francis Kingsford Holloway in 1843. By the beginning of the 20th century, there were Government gunpowder magazines and a Metropolitan Police barracks in Marchwood.

Marchwood Military Port was built here during World War II, which played a vital role in the Normandy landings. The Royal Navy Ordnance Depot was where the famous Mulberry harbours were made. The port continues to service Britain's overseas military interests.

== Demographics ==
Historical population
Year	Pop.	±%
1086 EST	12	—
1841	158	+1216.7%
1851	1,123	+610.8%
1881	791	−29.6%
1891	695	−12.1%
1901	611	−12.1%
1911	620	+1.5%
1921	767	+23.7%
1931	843	+9.9%
1951	1,636	+94.1%
1961	1,767	+8.0%
1991	4,908	+177.8%
2001	5,586	+13.8%
2011	6,141	+9.9%
2021	5,574	−9.2%
"1086 estimate from Domesday Book (four households). 1841–2021 figures from UK census data."

== Industry ==
Despite being a village, Marchwood is the home of a refuse incinerator known as Marchwood Incinerator (the remains of a previous incinerator, closed in the 1990s were finally pulled down in 2012), a sewage works, a large military port and a natural gas fuelled combined cycle power station known as Marchwood Power Station. replacing an older station which was dismantled during the 1980s. The 842 megawatt facility is one of the most efficient generators of electricity in the UK at 58% fuel efficiency. Until privatisation, Marchwood was home to one of the three principal research facilities of the Central Electricity Generating Board (CEGB), concentrating on heavy plant – the other facilities were at Leatherhead and at Berkeley.

== Education ==
Marchwood has two schools, an infant school situated in Twiggs Lane and a junior school in the village centre. The nearest secondary schools are Applemore College in Dibden Purlieu and Hounsdown School in Totton. The village does not have a public library. Nearby libraries are in Totton and Hythe.

== Transport ==
=== Road ===
Marchwood is most easily accessed by road via the A326 road (Marchwood Bypass) which runs from the M27 motorway, past Totton, Marchwood and Hythe, as far as the village of Holbury. This then lets down the Access roads of Jacobs Gutter Lane, Staplewood Drive and Twiggs Lane. The main point of access from the south (towards Hythe) is Hythe Road. Bluestar operates one daytime bus route through Marchwood every hour Monday to Saturday. The 8 service goes to Southampton via Totton in one direction and to Hythe and Calshot in the other. There is limited public transport from the village in the evenings.

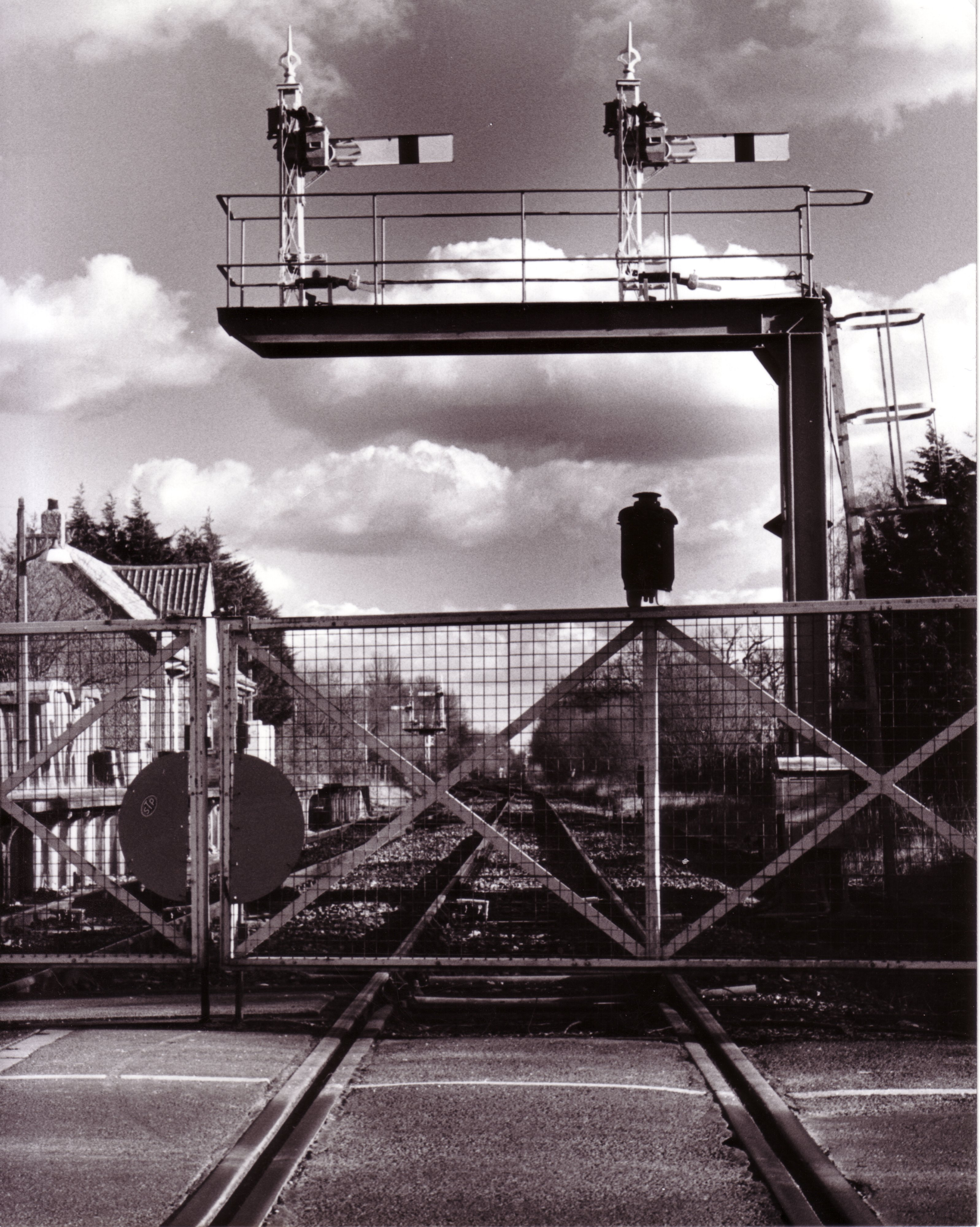
Marchwood railway station and level crossing gates, c.1996.

=== Rail ===
Marchwood railway station opened on the Fawley Branch Line beside Main Road on 20 July 1925. The station was closed by the Beeching Axe on 14 February 1966 and has remained closed since. Freight trains still operate on the line and a set of manual level crossing gates are still used on Main Road. Hampshire County Council have agreed to fund a study into reopening the Waterside line between Totton and Hythe, with a stop at Marchwood.

== Religious sites ==
Marchwood has four Christian churches. The Parish Church of St. John's; The Gospel Church; New Forest Community Church; and Fijian church, which meets in the army estate, mainly for those from Fiji posted in the military houses and barracks. The churches are active in the community: The New Forest Community Church run a local coffee shop in the village centre, the "sweet soul cafe"; The Gospel Church runs a Friday afternoon cafe "refreshers", ladies' and men's social groups, and various youth and children's clubs, meeting on Sundays at 10.30am at the Infant school; and the Parish church has strong links with the local schools.

== Sport ==
Marchwood is home to Staplewood Training Ground the training facilities of Southampton F.C. There is also Lloyds recreation ground which is home to a host of football clubs, as well as two tennis courts.

== Twin settlements ==
- Saint-Contest, near Caen, Normandy, France.
