= SELCHP =

Waste-to-energy plant in London, England

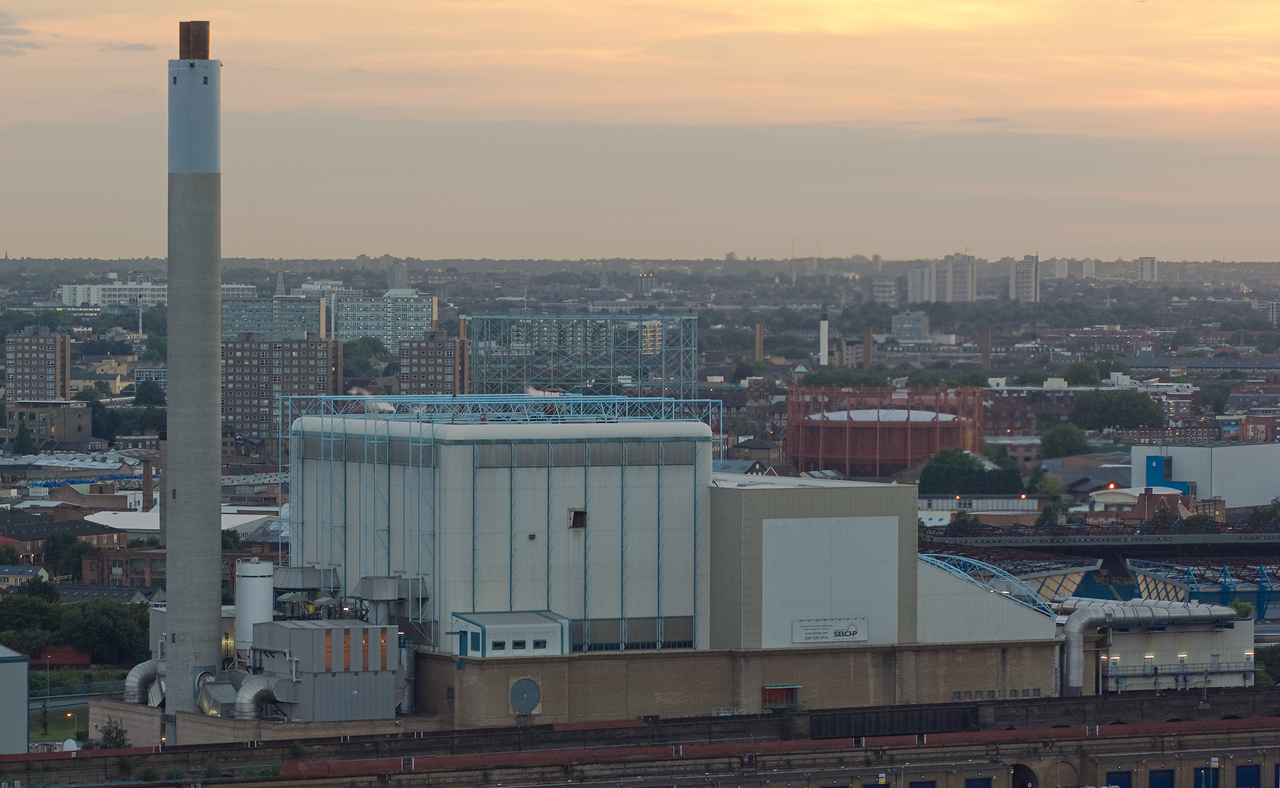
- The SELCHP Plant in 2007
- Official name: South East London Combined; Heat and Power Plant
- Country: England
- Location: Greater London
- Coordinates: 51.4856°N 0.0484°W
- Commission date: 1994
- Operator: Onyx SELCHP

Thermal power station
- Primary fuel: Waste

External links
- Commons: Related media on Commons

South East London Combined Heat and Power, better known as SELCHP, is a major energy from waste incineration plant in New Cross, London. It was designed to generate both heat and electricity. The plant can generate up to 35 MegaWatts of power using a steam turbine in electricity only mode. It can incinerate up to 420,000 tonnes per year of municipal solid waste.

== History ==
In 1986, faced with the increasing scarcity and the environmental problems of landfill, the local authorities of Lewisham, Southwark, and Greenwich came together to identify an alternative. In 1988, they formed an organisation - the South East London Combined Heat and Power Consortium - from which SELCHP now takes its name. The plans were taken forward by several Councillors, notably David Sullivan and Angela Cornforth of Lewisham and Len Duvall of Greenwich. A Lewisham Officer, Richard Siggers, was appointed as the first Project Manager. SELCHP was eventually established as a Limited Company in 1991, with the original shareholders being the London boroughs of Greenwich and Lewisham (Southwark did not invest), AHS Emstar (now Veolia), Martin Engineering Systems, John Laing, London Electricity and Mainmet. SELCHP Limited's first Chairman was Professor Gerald Atkins and its first Managing Director was Robert Wheatley. The two main shareholders (Martin Engineering Systems Limited and AHS Emstar) went on to obtain funding of £95 million and underwrote the construction of this first environmentally compliant (with EU regulations) Energy from Waste facility in Britain. Planning Permission for the development was obtained after a long public consultation phase which has been labeled a model of local public involvement. The SELCHP Facility was opened in November 1994 by the Prince of Wales. Originally, the Plant extracted energy from all of the post-recycling waste of Lewisham and Greenwich, and it now processes waste from several other London Boroughs as well. In 2024, more than 50 of these plants now operate in the British Isles.

In 2002 SELCHP was subject to direct action by Greenpeace UK. They were concerned about the potential negative health effects of the dioxins produced during the incineration of waste at the site. The plant was shut down for three and a half days when protesters entered the main tipping hall and climbed the chimney. The standoff was resolved when bailiffs entered the building and removed the protestors. As a result of the action both Liberal Democrats on Lewisham Council and the Shadow Environment Secretary Peter Ainsworth pledged their support to the campaign. Records of emissions are publicly available, as is the case with all similar Energy from Waste Plants.

SELCHP is currently operated by Veolia Environmental Services.

== See also ==
- List of incinerators in the UK
