= NESS Energy Project =

Incinerator in Aberdeen, UK

Coordinates: 57°7′36.46″N 2°4′38.08″W

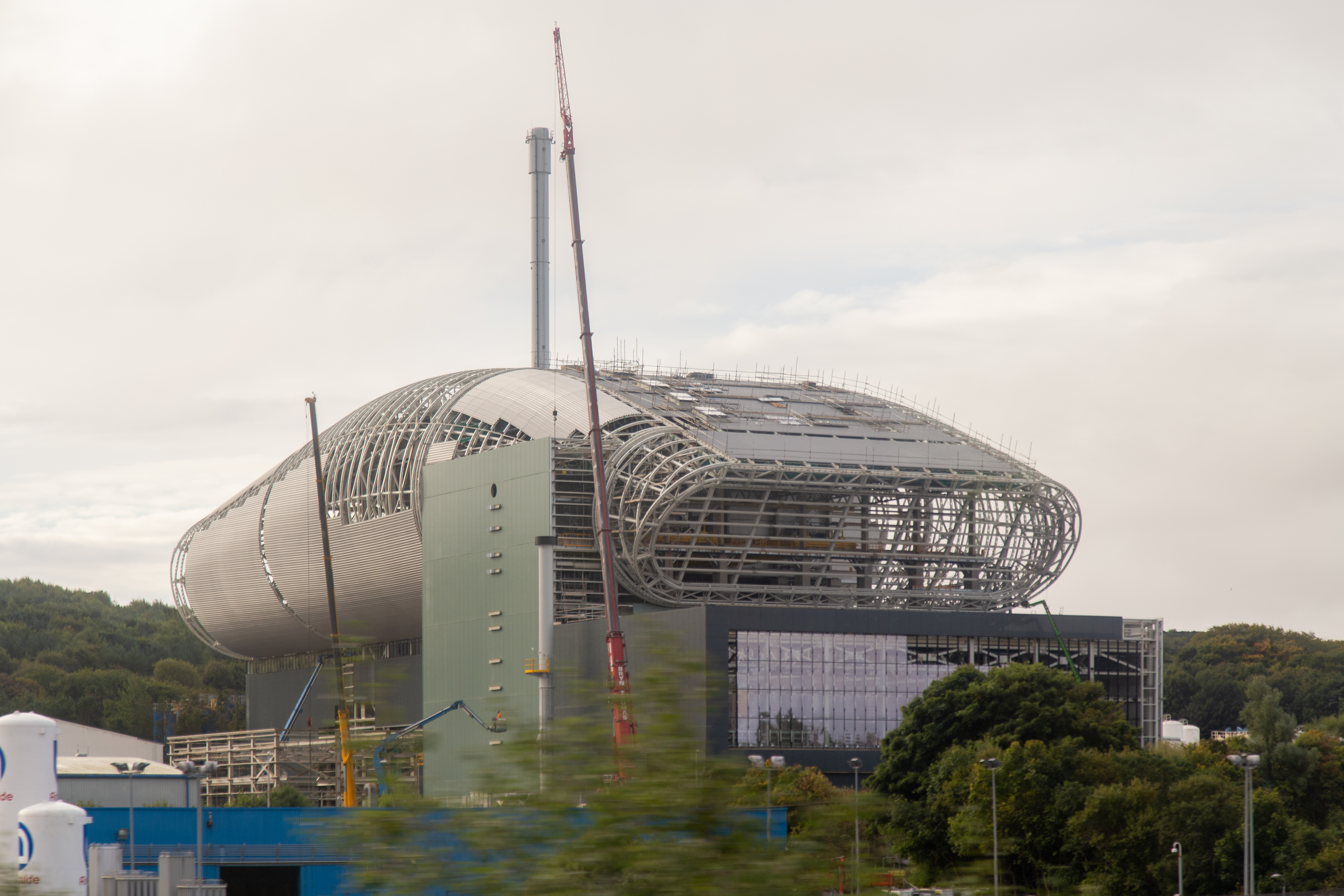
The facility under construction (2022)

The NESS Energy Project is an incinerator currently in full operation in Aberdeen, Scotland. It is situated in East Tullos Industrial Estate on a site formerly used for gas storage.

== History ==
In February 2022, construction workers staged a walkout in a dispute over unpaid wages.

== Operation ==
The facility is designed to burn up to 150,000 tonnes of material per year, consisting of non-recyclable waste from Aberdeen City Council, Aberdeenshire Council, and Moray Council.

The facility will be operated by Acciona, who were awarded a contract worth approximately 400 million euros (£371 million) for the construction of the facility and its operation over 20 years. The incinerator bottom ash produced by the facility will be transported to a state of the art processing facility, where many of the metals which would have been lost to landfill will be recovered and sent for further processing before resmelting into recycled materials. The remaining cleaned sand, gravels and aggregates are suitable for re-use in certain construction projects throughout eastern Scotland and off set the carbon generated from quarrying the equivalent volume of raw materials.
