= Isle of Man Incinerator =

Incinerator on the Isle Of Man

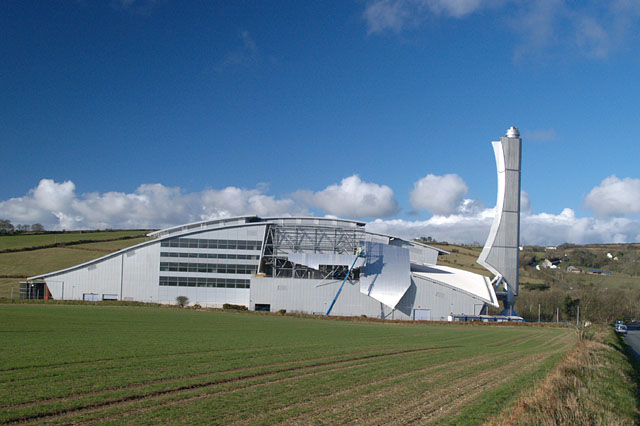
- Isle of Man incinerator in 2004
- Official name: Isle of Man incinerator
- Country: United Kingdom
- Coordinates: 54.1423°N 4.5305°W
- Status: Operational
- Commission date: 2004
- Operator: Suez Recycling and Recovery UK

Thermal power station
- Primary fuel: Waste

External links
- Commons: Related media on Commons

The Isle of Man Incinerator was designed by Savage & Chadwick Architects and has an unusual shape and design, the stack of which is designed to represent a Viking sail. SUEZ Recycling and Recovery UK was awarded the contract to design, build and operate the incinerator by the Isle of Man Government. The incinerator is located on an old disused landfill and has a capacity to treat 60,000 tonnes of municipal waste, in addition to clinical and animal waste. In order to accomplish this, the facility actually incorporates two separate incinerators. The facility uses moving grate technology.

== In popular culture ==
The incinerator was used as a location in the filming of the 2006 film Stormbreaker.

== See also ==
- List of incinerators in the UK
- Kirklees Incinerator
