= Millerhill Recycling and Energy Recovery Centre =

Recycling and waste incineration facility

Coordinates: 55°55′30″N 3°05′07″W

Millerhill Recycling and Energy Recovery Centre is a recycling and waste incineration facility at Millerhill in Midlothian, near Edinburgh in Scotland. It was built on part of the site of the Millerhill Marshalling Yard; construction began in October 2016 and the plant opened fully in September 2019. Commissioned by the City of Edinburgh Council and Midlothian Council, the plant cost £142 million and will divert 155,000 tons of waste a year from going to landfill. It burns treated waste to generate electricity which is fed into the National Grid. The plant uses combustion and XeroSorp flue gas treatment from Hitachi Zosen Inova. This is a dry adsorption system which uses sodium bicarbonate to clean the exhaust.
