= SYSAV waste-to-energy plant =

Plant in Malmo, Sweden

SYSAV
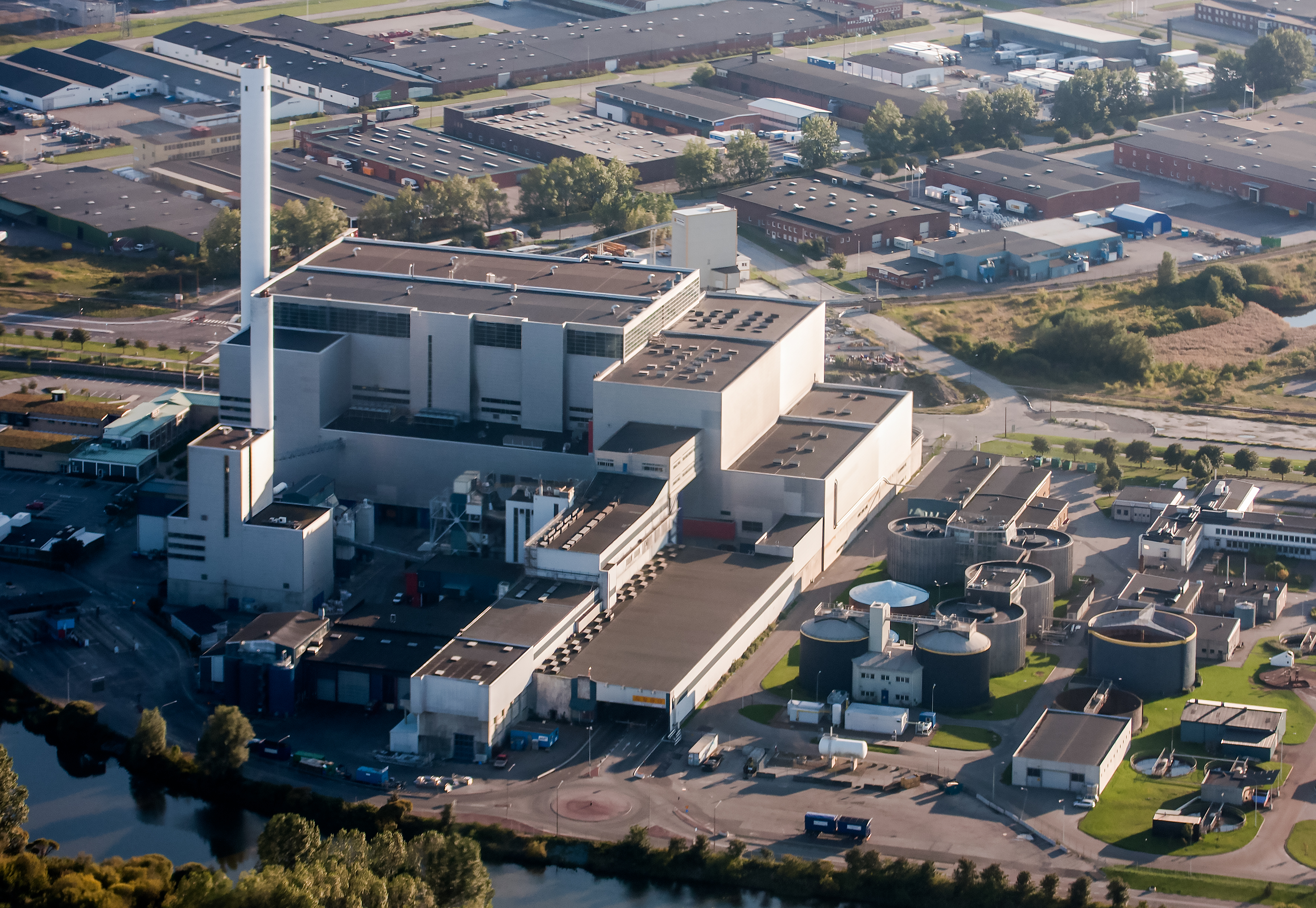
- SYSAV's waste-to-energy plant in Malmö, Sweden
- Official name: Sysav South Scania Waste (Sydskånes avfallsaktiebolag)
- Country: Sweden
- Location: Malmö
- Coordinates: 55°37′47.7″N 13°02′45.9″E
- Status: Operational
- Owner: SYSAV
- Operator: SYSAV

Thermal power station
- Primary fuel: Municipal waste

External links
- Website: SYSAV (Swedish)

The SYSAV (Sysav South Scania Waste) waste-to-energy plant is a waste-to-energy plant in Malmö, Sweden, which treats waste from the southern province of Skåne. The plant is owned by fourteen local authorities in Skåne. In 2008, a fourth unit was built alongside engineering consultancy Ramboll, making it is one of the largest waste-to-energy plants in Northern Europe.

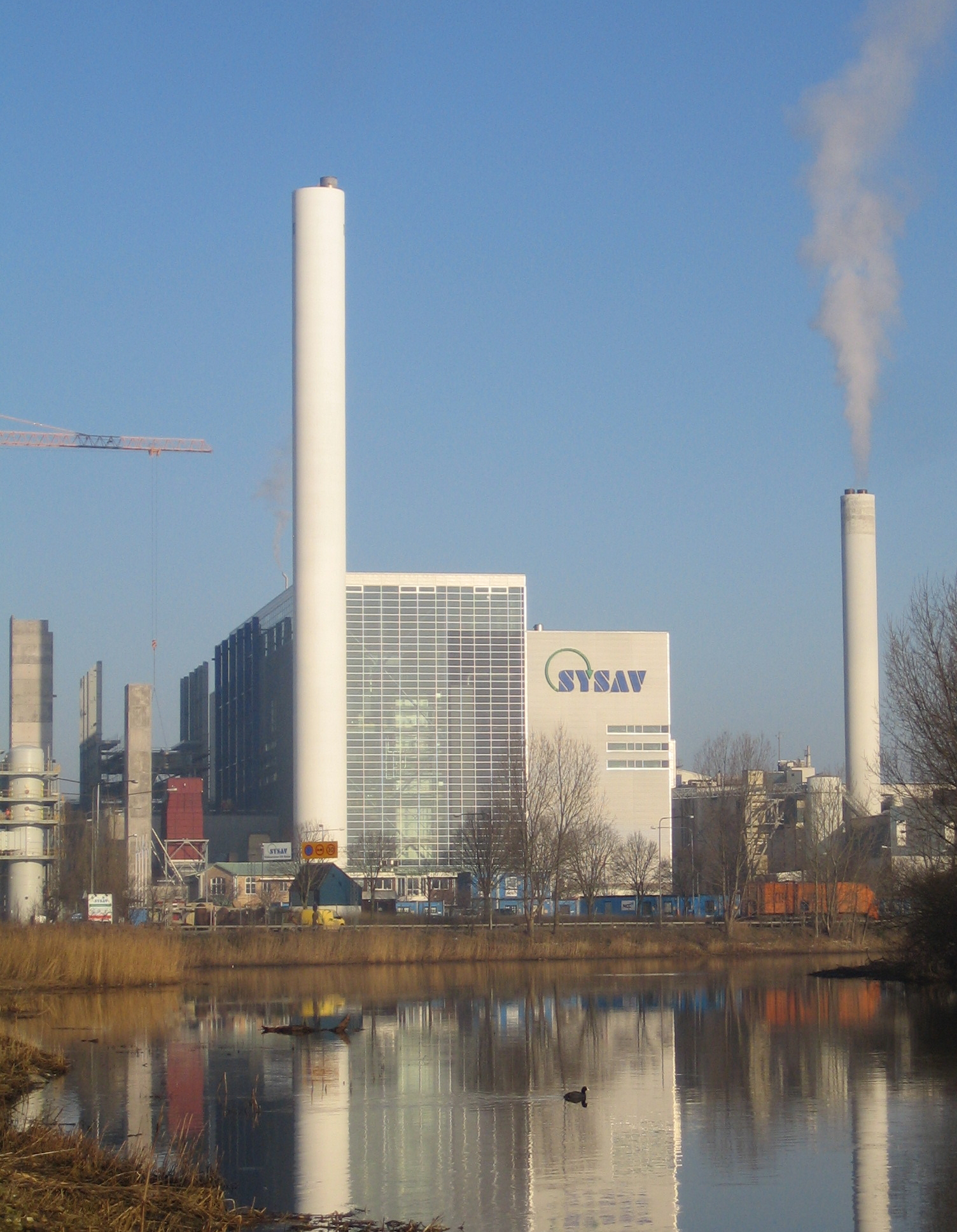
SYSAV's waste-to-energy plant.

== Overview ==
The SYSAV waste-to-energy plant is the most energy efficient plant in Sweden, as well as being one of the most advanced plants in the world. The plant includes four boilers, the first two of which began operation in 1973. The two advanced boilers, fitted in 2003 and 2008 respectively, are steam boilers that generate electricity and district heating.

SYSAV also have various sites throughout the province of Skåne, which are used to process, sort, store and recycle waste. Specific examples include sorting bulky waste, composting, chipping wood, recovering metals and reloading. The sites were originally designed to be landfills, but only a small portion of the waste goes to landfill at two of the sites. The sites include facilities to process household and commercial waste, using waste combustion to recover energy, biological treatment, re-use, recycling and landfill. SYSAV also have a facility for dealing with hazardous waste.
