= Marchwood ERF =

Waste-to-energy power station near Southampton, UK

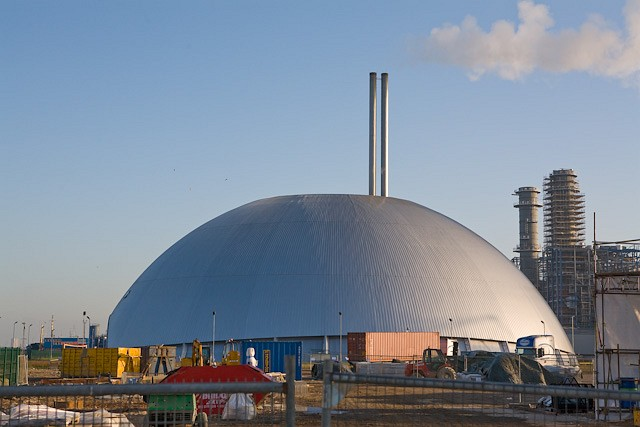
- Marchwood ERF in 2009
- Official name: Marchwood Energy Recovery Facility
- Country: England
- Location: Hampshire, South East England
- Coordinates: 50.899827°N 1.438534°W
- Commission date: 2007
- Operator: Veolia

Thermal power station
- Primary fuel: Waste

Power generation
- Nameplate capacity: 17 MW

Marchwood ERF (or Marchwood Energy Recovery Facility) is a waste incineration plant in Marchwood, near Southampton, England. It is situated beside the estuary of the River Test where it meets Southampton Water, opposite the Port of Southampton. It burns municipal waste and produces electricity for the National Grid.

== History ==
The first incinerator at Marchwood was a small plant which took refuse from Southampton and the New Forest, and was commissioned in 1975. This plant was closed in 1996. Demolition of the plant, which took place in 2010, was temporarily suspended when a pair of kestrels nested at the site.

The new plant, commissioned in 2007, was built close to the site of the old incinerator. The plant is surrounded by a metal dome superstructure which was designed by the architect Jean-Robert Mazaud. The dome was built by the Texas company Geometrica. It was built using galvanized steel tubing joined with high-strength aluminium hubs, which was then clad in aluminium.

== See also ==
- List of incinerators in the United Kingdom
- Marchwood Power Station
