= Suez Recycling and Recovery UK =

Waste management company in the UK

SUEZ recycling and recovery UK Ltd
- Type: Limited company
- Industry: Waste Management
- Founded: 1988
- Headquarters: SUEZ House, Grenfell Rd, Maidenhead SL6 1ES, Maidenhead, United Kingdom
- Number of locations: 300
- Key people: John Scanlon (CEO) Stuart Hayward-Higham (Chief Technical Development and Innovation Officer) Dr Adam Read (Chief Sustainability and External Affairs Officer)
- Products: Waste management
- Number of employees: 5,000
- Parent: Suez Environnement
- Website: https://www.suez.co.uk/

SUEZ Recycling and Recovery UK Ltd, formerly SITA UK Limited, is a British waste management company, established in 1988. It was previously called Sitaclean Technology. It began as a provider of local authority services, with its first municipal services contract in Erewash, Derbyshire in 1989. Suez has expanded its business through a combination of new contracts, joint venture partnerships and acquisitions.

SUEZ recycling and recovery UK serves over 12 million people and handles more than 9 million tonnes of domestic, commercial and industrial waste through a network of recycling, composting, energy-from-waste and landfill facilities.

SUEZ is a growing producer of energy, generating, electricity from landfill gas as well as the combustion of waste and recently became the UK's first producer of biomethane transport fuel made from landfill gas. SUEZ recycling and recovery UK's landfill sites account for about three per cent of the UK's renewable energy generation.

== History ==
In 1999, SITA UK won a 25-year waste management contract for Surrey County Council. Revenue then grew from £50m in 1990 to over £100m in 1995 and £350m by 1999.

SITA UK is now a recycling and resource management company and provider of services to local authorities and businesses. SITA UK is now part of the Suez Environment business, which focuses on sustainable development. In July 2008, following the merger between SUEZ and Gaz de France (GDF), Suez became a listed group on the Brussels and Paris stock exchanges.

In 2013 municipal biodegradable waste diversion targets put pressure on local authorities to find alternatives to landfill. The company is developing landfill replacement facilities other technologies, including anaerobic digestion, in-vessel composting, mechanical biological treatment and both conventional energy-from-waste and gasification.

== SUEZ Communities Trust ==
SUEZ Communities Trust was created in 1997 to support community and environmental projects using funds from SUEZ recycling and recovery UK's landfill tax. The trust provides funding for a wide range of schemes and was the first environmental body accredited by ENTRUST, the Government regulator for organisations distributing grants from the Landfill Communities fund.

Since 1997 the Trust has supported more than 2,000 projects to a combined value of more than £74 million. The Trust provides funding through its two schemes, Enhancing Communities and Enriching Nature.

Enhancing Communities is a programme for community improvement projects within three miles of qualifying waste processing sites owned by SUEZ recycling and recovery UK. Enriching Nature is a programme supporting biodiversity conservation projects within ten miles of any landfill site in England.
