= Stoke EfW =

Municipal waste incinerator and energy from waste facility in Stoke on Trent

Coordinates: 52.989461°N 2.182310°W

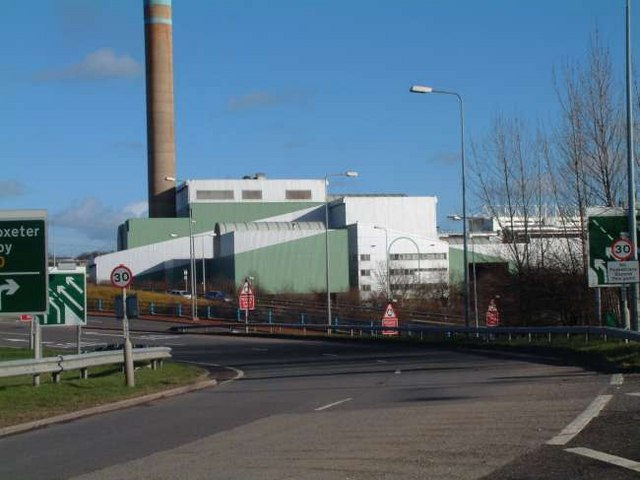
Stoke EfW, seen adjacent to the A50/A500 junction

Stoke EfW is a large incineration plant in the Sideway area of Stoke-on-Trent, England. It burns municipal waste and in the process produces electricity for the National Grid. The plant uses two parallel incineration streams, with each stream formed of an inclined grate furnace, a CNIM designed boiler, and associated flue gas treatment. The flue gas treatment at the plant is composed of selective non-catalytic reduction using dry urea powder and a bag filter system to capture particulate. Each stream is capable of processing up to 12.5 tonnes of waste to produce 36 tonnes of steam per hour.

The main byproducts of the process are incinerator bottom ash (IBA), air pollution control residues (APCr), and flue gases. IBA is removed by a licensed operator and can be reused in aggregate production, while APCr is disposed of at licensed facilities.

The plant was originally built in 1989 and is operated by Hanford Waste Services Ltd. The original plant was found to release 300 times the standard level of dioxins, so was replaced with a new facility, opening in October 1998. The plant is dominated by a 76-metre-tall chimney stack and has a total installed generating capacity of 15.4 megawatts.

The contract to operate the incinerator is set to expire in March 2030, at which point the incinerator will be at the end of its serviceable life. Stoke on Trent city council plans to build a replacement incinerator on adjacent land currently occupied by the Hanford Household Waste and Recycling Centre, which would be moved to a new location. This would allow the new incinerator to be built while allowing the existing incinerator to continue operations. The new facility is expected to be operational by 2032, and is expected to be operated by the city council under an "entrepreneurial" model.
