= Kanadevia Inova =

Swiss waste-to-energy company

Kanadevia Inova (formerly known as Hitachi Zosen Inova or HZI) is a Swiss company specialising in Waste to Energy (also known as WtE). It is a subsidiary of the Japanese Kanadevia Corporation since its acquisition in 2010 from A-TEC Industries.

== History ==
Kanadevia Inova formed, as L. von Roll Bamag AG, in 1933, as a spin-off of the company Gesellschaft der Ludwig von Roll'schen Eisenwerke, which dated from 1823, and specialised in waste treatment. By 1966 the company was operating in France, Germany, Japan and Sweden. In 1975 US operations began. The environmental arm of the company was called Von Roll Inova Group. In 2003 Austrian Energy & Environment Group (AE&E) bought Von Roll Inova on behalf of A-TEC Industries.

Shares in Costain Group dropped when AE&E delayed £22 million in payments due for building the Riverside Resource Recovery ERF in London in November 2010.

AE&E Inova changed its name to Hitachi Zosen Inova in December 2010 when A-TEC went into administration, and sold it to the Hitachi Zosen Corporation.

In 2014 HZI acquired Axpo Kompogas, allowing it to sell anaerobic waste digestion technology in the UK.

In 2021 HZI acquired from Viessmann Group the german company Schmack Biogas Service, a supplier in the biogas industry, founded in 1995, which was renamed Hitachi Zosen Inova Schmack.

In March 2024, HZI acquired Schmack Biogas Srl, an Italian biomethane EPC company formerly part of the German Schmack Biogas holding, from PLC Spa.

In October 2024 Hitachi Zosen Inova rebranded as Kanadevia Inova following Hitachi Zosen Corp rebranding as Kanadevia Corp Company. The Kanadevia Iniva organization was not altered in this rebranding.

== Projects ==
The Millerhill Recycling and Energy Recovery Centre outside Edinburgh opened in 2019, using combustion and XeroSorp flue gas treatment from HZI. This is a dry adsorption system which uses sodium bicarbonate to clean the exhaust.

In 2019 the company was contracted to build what would be the largest WtE plant in England, at Rookery South, near Stewartby in Bedfordshire. The project was expected to be completed in 2022, and was the firm's eleventh EfW project in the UK. Local residents mounted a nine-year protest against the plant, which was being built on an abandoned quarry.

The Newhurst EfW plant, in Shepshed in the East Midlands just off the M1, was expected to open in 2023. Ingo Eifert was the project leader for HZI. It was to use similar technology to that at Millerhill.

HZI was building Western Australia's first EfW plant near Perth; it was expected to come online in late 2022.
