= Lakeside EfW =

Lakeside Energy from Waste
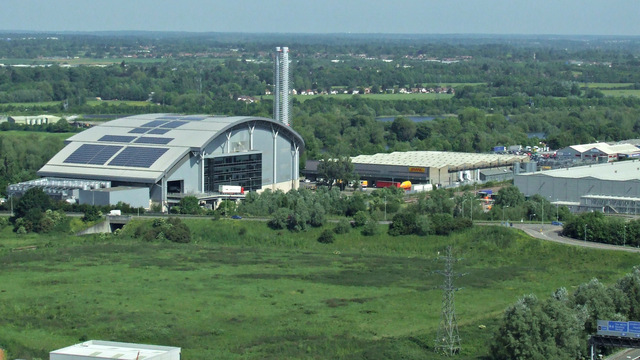
- Aerial view of the facility
- Country: England
- Location: Colnbrook, Slough
- Coordinates: 51.4852°N 0.5055°W
- Status: Operational
- Commission date: 2010
- Operators: Lakeside EfW Ltd. (Joint venture of Grundon Waste Management and Viridor)

Thermal power station
- Primary fuel: Waste

Power generation
- Nameplate capacity: 37 MW

External links
- Website: www.lakesideefw.co.uk

The Lakeside EfW is located in Colnbrook, Slough. It incinerates residual waste, and since 2010 it has also been authorised to incinerate low-level radioactive waste.

== Ownership ==
The Lakeside EfW is run by Lakeside Energy from Waste Ltd, which is a joint venture between Grundon Waste Management and Viridor. The energy-from-waste facility was established at a cost of £160 million and was officially opened by the Duke of Edinburgh on 27 October 2010.

== Capacity ==
It is capable of processing 410,000 tonnes of residual waste annually and generating 37MW of electricity, enough to power the borough of Slough.

== Possible relocation ==
In 2014, expansion plans for London's Heathrow Airport suggested that the super incinerator would need to be relocated to make way for a new runway.
