= Incinerator bottom ash =

Agglomerated ashes produced in the lower part of an oven or a kiln

Incinerator bottom ash (IBA) is a form of ash produced in incineration facilities. This material is discharged from the moving grate of municipal solid waste incinerators. Once IBA is processed by removing contaminants, it can be used as an aggregate. Following processing, the material is termed IBA aggregate or processed IBA. The aggregate uses include:

- Bulk fill
- Asphalt
- Cement bound materials
- Lightweight blocks
- Pavement concrete

Alternatively, if there are no local markets for the IBA the material is disposed of in a landfill.

== Recovery ==
IBA is a secondary source of ferrous and non-ferrous (NFe) metals. Between 5-15% of the bottom ash is made up of ferrous materials, and 1-5% is NFe. Despite glass making up 10-30% of IBA, it is not systematically recovered in any processing plants. On average, 63 kg of ferrous materials are removed from a single tonne of ash.

== Risks ==
Foam concrete made from IBA led to an explosion in the United Kingdom in 2009. It was discovered that the aluminum in the concrete can form hydrogen gas deposits while the concrete sets. The Health and Safety Executive updated their guidelines to suggest IBA aggregates can only be poured in open air, in well ventilated areas, and no spark-generating tools, such as disc cutters and angle grinders, can be used during setting.

== See also ==
- Bottom ash (coal combustion)
- Waste-to-energy
