= Waste-to-energy =

Process of generating energy from the primary treatment of waste

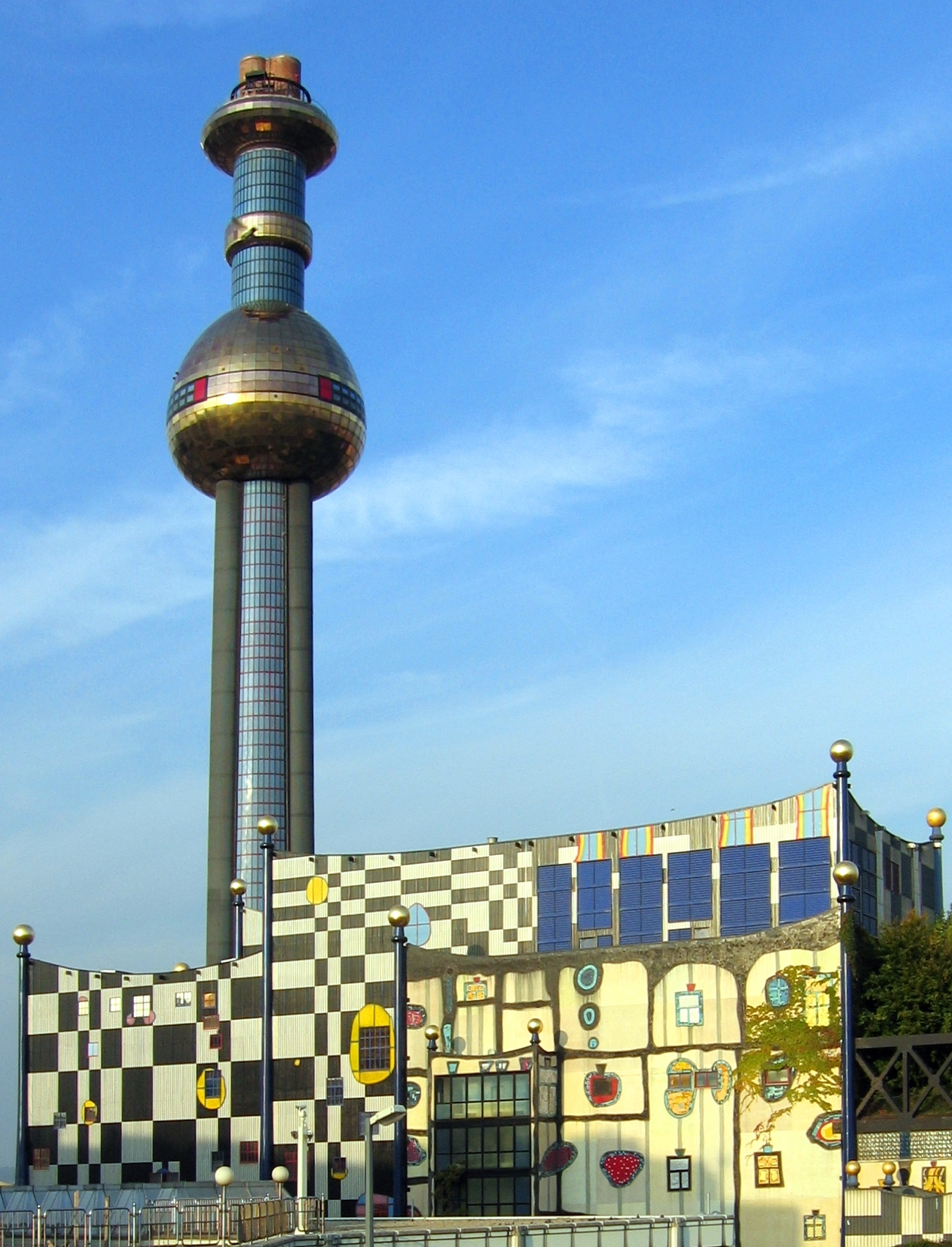
Spittelau incineration plant, with its distinct Hundertwasser facade, is providing combined heat and power in Vienna.

Waste-to-energy (WtE) or energy-from-waste (EfW) are processes designed to convert waste materials into usable forms of energy, typically electricity or heat, in waste-to-energy plants. As a form of energy recovery, WtE plays a crucial role in both waste management and sustainable energy production by reducing the volume of waste in landfills and providing an alternative energy source.

The most common method of WtE is direct combustion of waste to produce heat, which can then be used to generate electricity via steam turbines. This method is widely employed in many countries and offers a dual benefit: it disposes of waste while generating energy, making it an efficient process for both waste reduction and energy production.

In addition to combustion, other WtE technologies focus on converting waste into fuel sources. For example, gasification and pyrolysis are processes that thermochemically decompose organic materials in the absence of oxygen to produce syngas, a synthetic gas primarily composed of hydrogen, carbon monoxide, and small amounts of carbon dioxide. This syngas can be converted into methane, methanol, ethanol, or even synthetic fuels, which can be used in various industrial processes or as alternative fuels in transportation.

Furthermore, anaerobic digestion, a biological process, converts organic waste into biogas (mainly methane and carbon dioxide) through microbial action. This biogas can be harnessed for energy production or processed into biomethane, which can serve as a substitute for natural gas.

The WtE process contributes to circular economy principles by transforming waste products into valuable resources, reducing dependency on fossil fuels, and mitigating greenhouse gas emissions. However, challenges remain, particularly in ensuring that emissions from WtE plants, such as dioxins and furans, are properly managed to minimize environmental impact. Advanced pollution control technologies are essential to address these concerns and ensure WtE remains a viable, environmentally sound solution.

WtE technologies present a significant opportunity to manage waste sustainably while contributing to global energy demands. They represent an essential component of integrated waste management strategies and a shift toward renewable energy systems. As technology advances, WtE may play an increasingly critical role in both reducing landfill use and enhancing energy security.

== History ==
In the early history, around 1000 BCE, open burning of waste was practiced in Jerusalem, where the ashes were used as fertilizer. As human settlements grew, burning waste became common to reduce waste volume and to combat rats and disease, though not yet for energy production.

It was not until the late 19th century that the first attempts were made to produce energy from burning waste. The first, unsuccessful, incinerator was built around 1870 in London. A few years later in 1874, the "Destructor" was built by Manlove, Alliott & Co. Ltd. in Nottingham, UK, to the design of Alfred Fryer. The USA's first incinerator was built in 1885 on Governors Island in New York, New York. In 1903 first waste-to-energy unit in Denmark was built in Frederiksberg, Copenhagen. The first facility in the Czech Republic was built in 1905 in Brno. These first incinerators lacked control of emissions, leading to severe air, soil, and water pollution with heavy metals, acid gasses and toxic organics.

By the 1970s, the public awareness of health and environmental protection increased, resulting in a holistic view of waste management. Air pollution control systems were developed to reduce the emissions of hazardous substances by more than 99%. As part of this innovation, the heat was used, either directly for heating or for producing electricity. Technologies for processing residual solid mixed waste have only become a focus of attention in recent years, stimulated by the search for more efficient energy recovery.

== Methods ==
=== Incineration ===
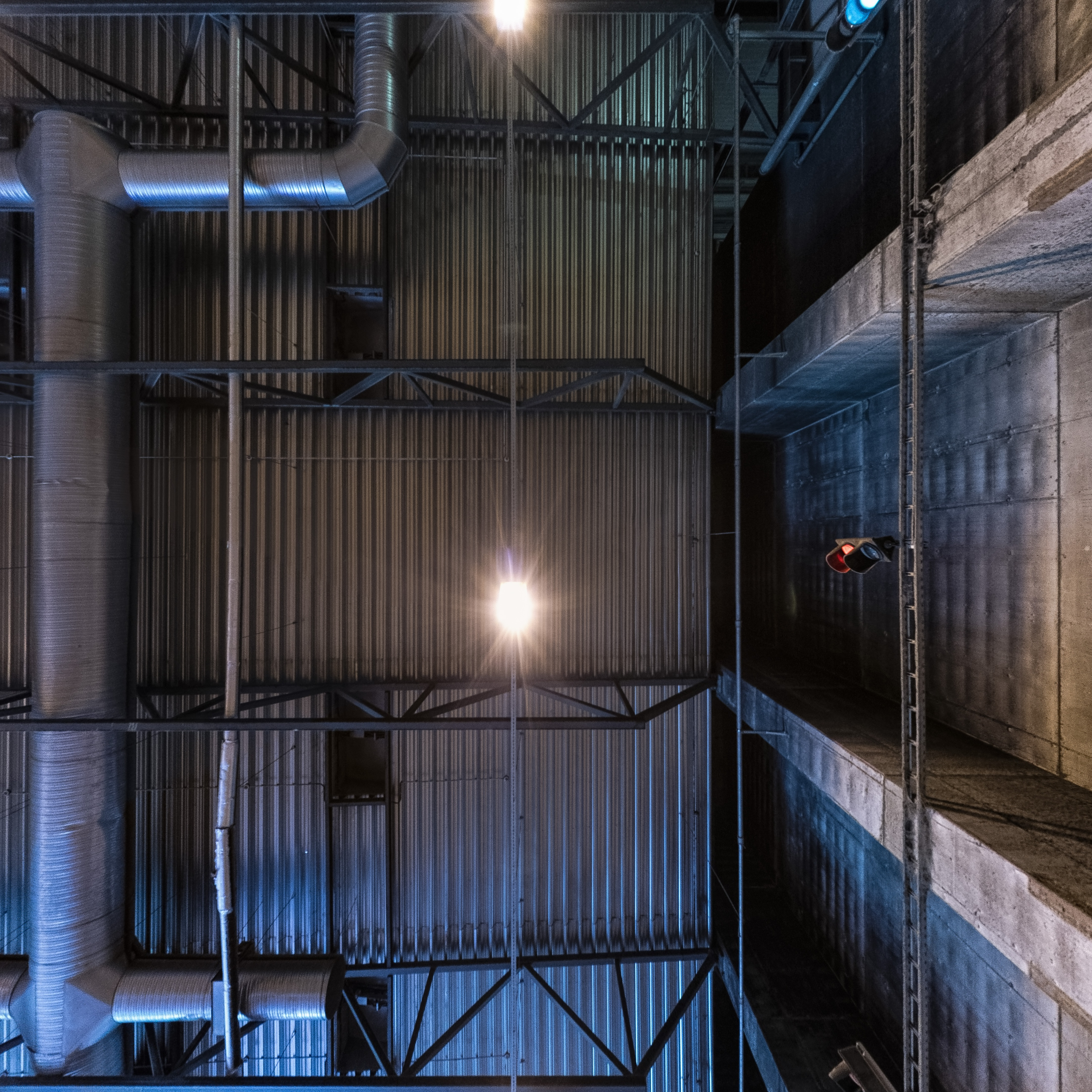
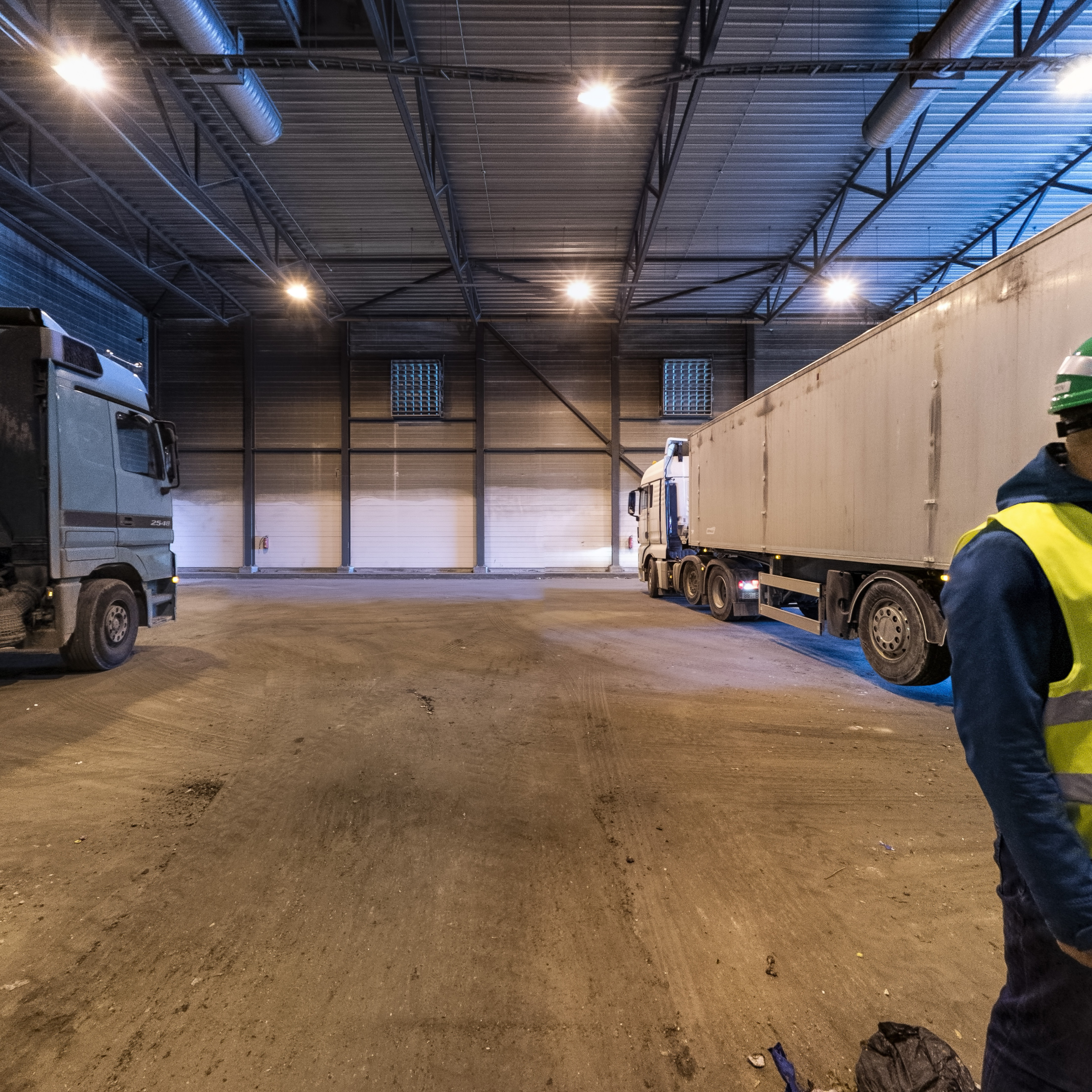
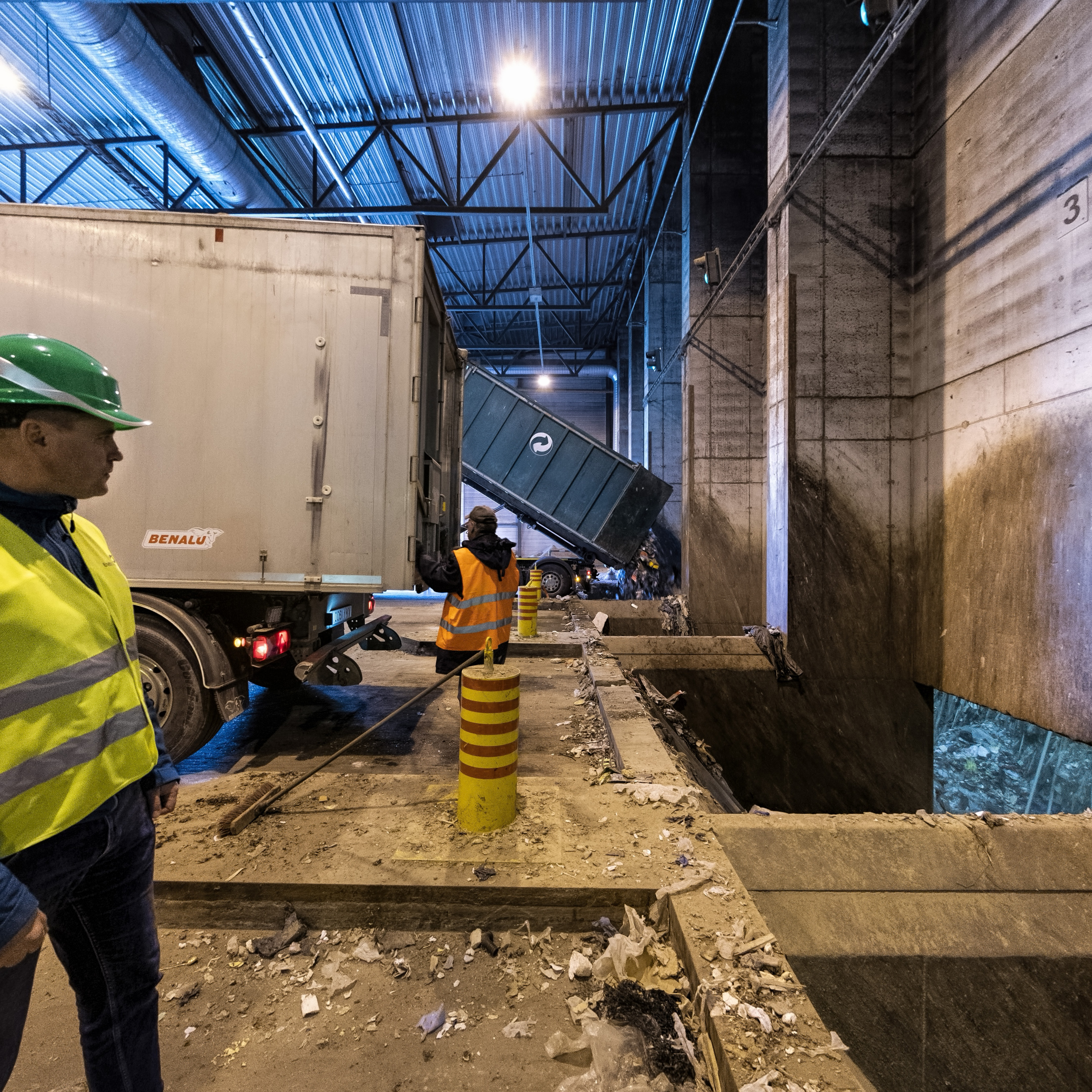
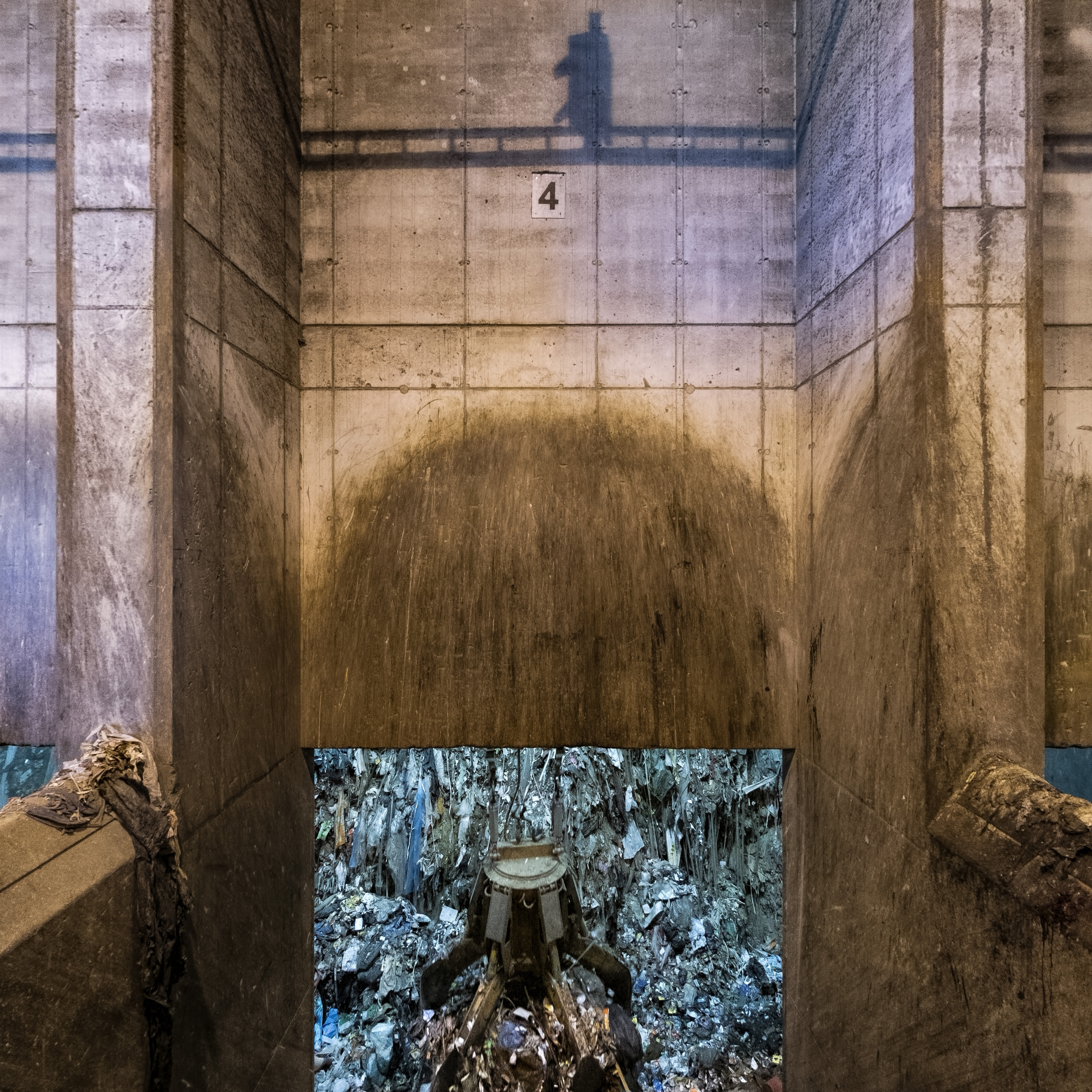
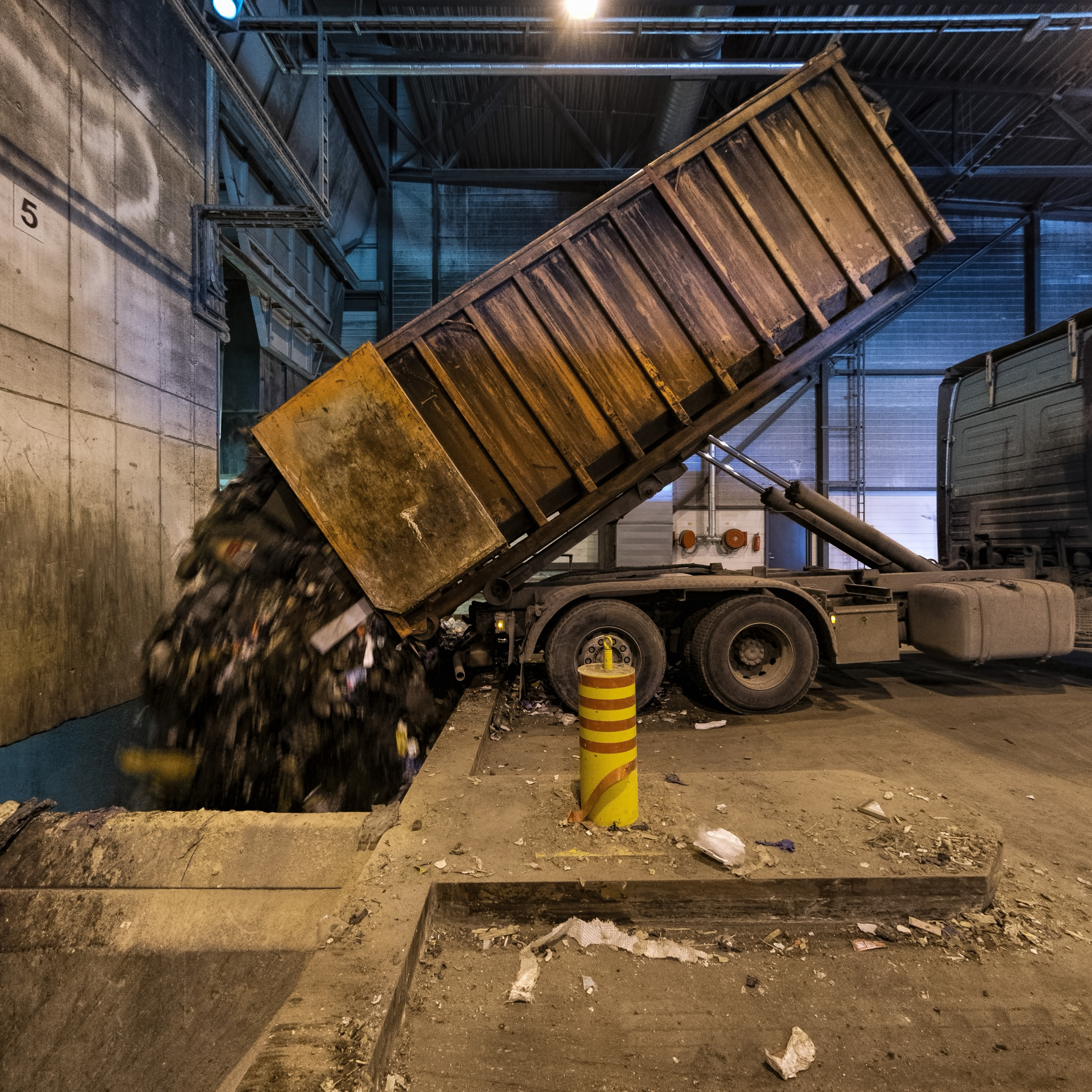
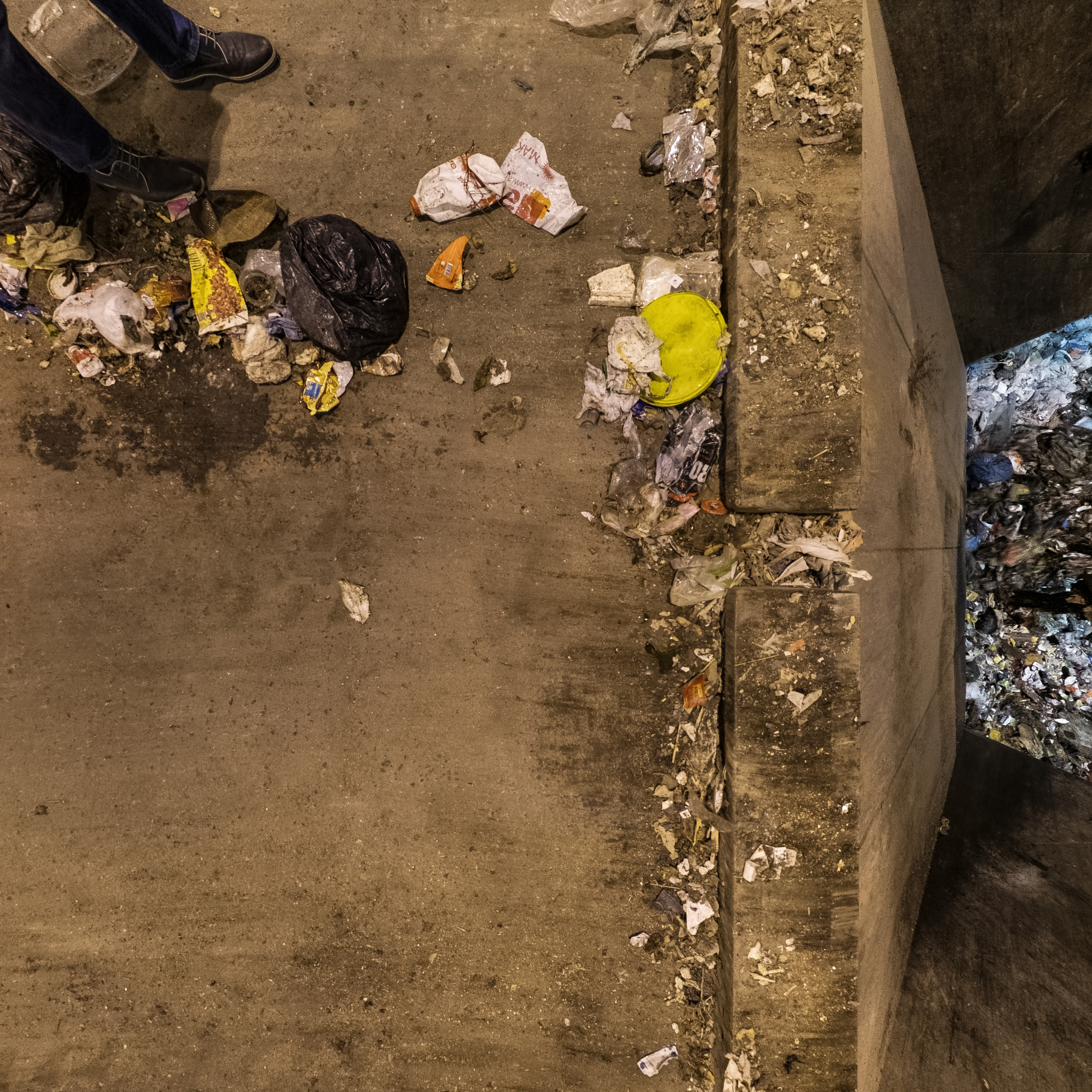
Waste being deposited at Iru power plant to be incinerated.

Incineration, the combustion of organic material such as waste with energy recovery, is the most common WtE implementation. All new WtE plants in OECD countries incinerating waste (residual MSW, commercial, industrial or RDF) must meet strict emission standards, including those on nitrogen oxides (NO_{x}), sulphur dioxide (SO_{2}), heavy metals and dioxins. Hence, modern incineration plants are vastly different from old types, some of which neither recovered energy nor materials. Modern incinerators reduce the volume of the original waste by 95-96 percent, depending upon composition and degree of recovery of materials such as metals from the ash for recycling.

Incinerators may emit fine particulate, heavy metals, microplastics, trace dioxin and acid gas, even though these emissions are relatively low from modern incinerators.Incineration of plastics does not result in their complete combustion. Research carried out in China in 2025 has found high levels of non-combusted, superheated microplastic in flue gas, averaging 2.1 trillion microplastics per annum per incinerator.

European countries which recycle the most (up to 70%) also incinerate to avoid landfilling.

By passing the smoke through the basic lime scrubbers, any acids that might be in the smoke are neutralized which prevents the acid from reaching the atmosphere and hurting the environment. Many other devices, such as fabric filters, reactors, and catalysts destroy or capture other regulated pollutants. According to The New York Times, modern incineration plants are so clean that "many times more dioxin is now released from home fireplaces and backyard barbecues than from incineration". According to the German Environmental Ministry, "because of stringent regulations, waste incineration plants are no longer significant in terms of emissions of dioxins, dust, and heavy metals".

Compared with other waste to energy technologies, incineration seems to be the most attractive due to its higher power production efficiency, lower investment costs, and lower emission rates. Additionally, incineration yields the highest amount of electricity with the highest capacity to lessen pile of wastes in landfills through direct combustion.

=== Fuel from plastics ===
One process that is used to convert plastic into fuel is pyrolysis, the thermal decomposition of materials at high temperatures in an inert atmosphere. It involves change of chemical composition and is mainly used for treatment of organic materials. In large scale production, plastic waste is ground and melted and then pyrolyzed. Catalytic converters help in the process. The vapours are condensed with oil or fuel and accumulated in settling tanks and filtered. Fuel is obtained after homogenation and can be used for automobiles and machinery. It is commonly termed as thermofuel or energy from plastic.

A new process uses a two-part catalyst, cobalt and zeolite, to convert plastics into propane. It works on polyethylene and polypropylene and the propane yield is approximately 80%.

=== Other ===
There are a number of other new and emerging technologies that are able to produce energy from waste and other fuels without direct combustion. Many of these technologies have the potential to produce more electric power from the same amount of fuel than would be possible by direct combustion. This is mainly due to the separation of corrosive components (ash) from the converted fuel, thereby allowing higher combustion temperatures in e.g. boilers, gas turbines, internal combustion engines, fuel cells. Some advanced technologies are able to efficiently convert the energy in the feedstocks into liquid or gaseous fuels, using heat but in the absence of oxygen, without actual combustion, by using a combination of thermal technologies. Typically, they are cleaner, as the feedstock is separated prior to treatment to remove the unwanted components:

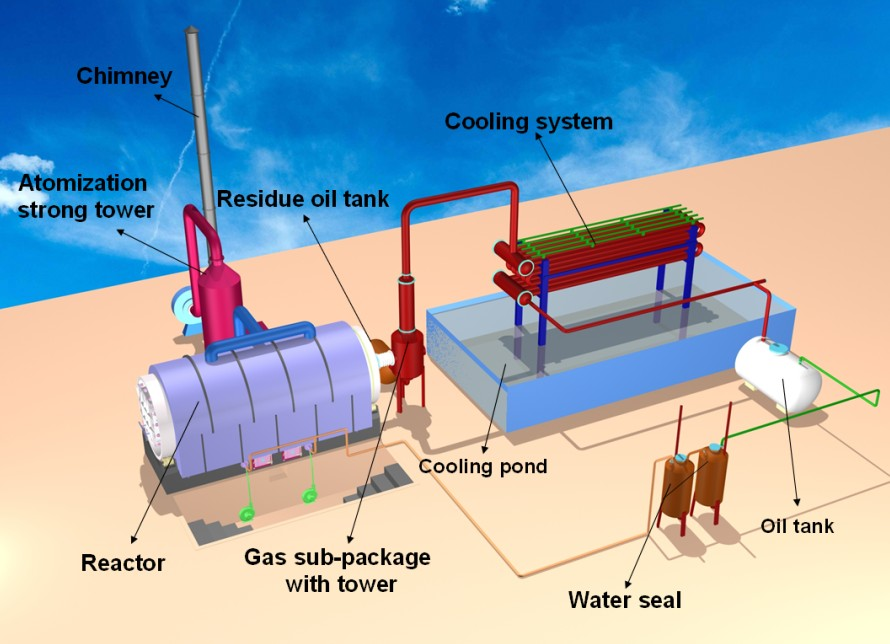
Pyrolysis Plant

Thermal treatment technologies include:

- Gasification: produces combustible gas, hydrogen, synthetic fuels
- Thermal depolymerization: produces synthetic crude oil, which can be further refined
- Pyrolysis: produces combustible tar/bio-oil and chars
- Plasma arc gasification or plasma gasification process (PGP): produces rich syngas including hydrogen and carbon monoxide usable for fuel cells or generating electricity to drive the plasma arch, usable vitrified silicate and metal ingots, salt and sulphur

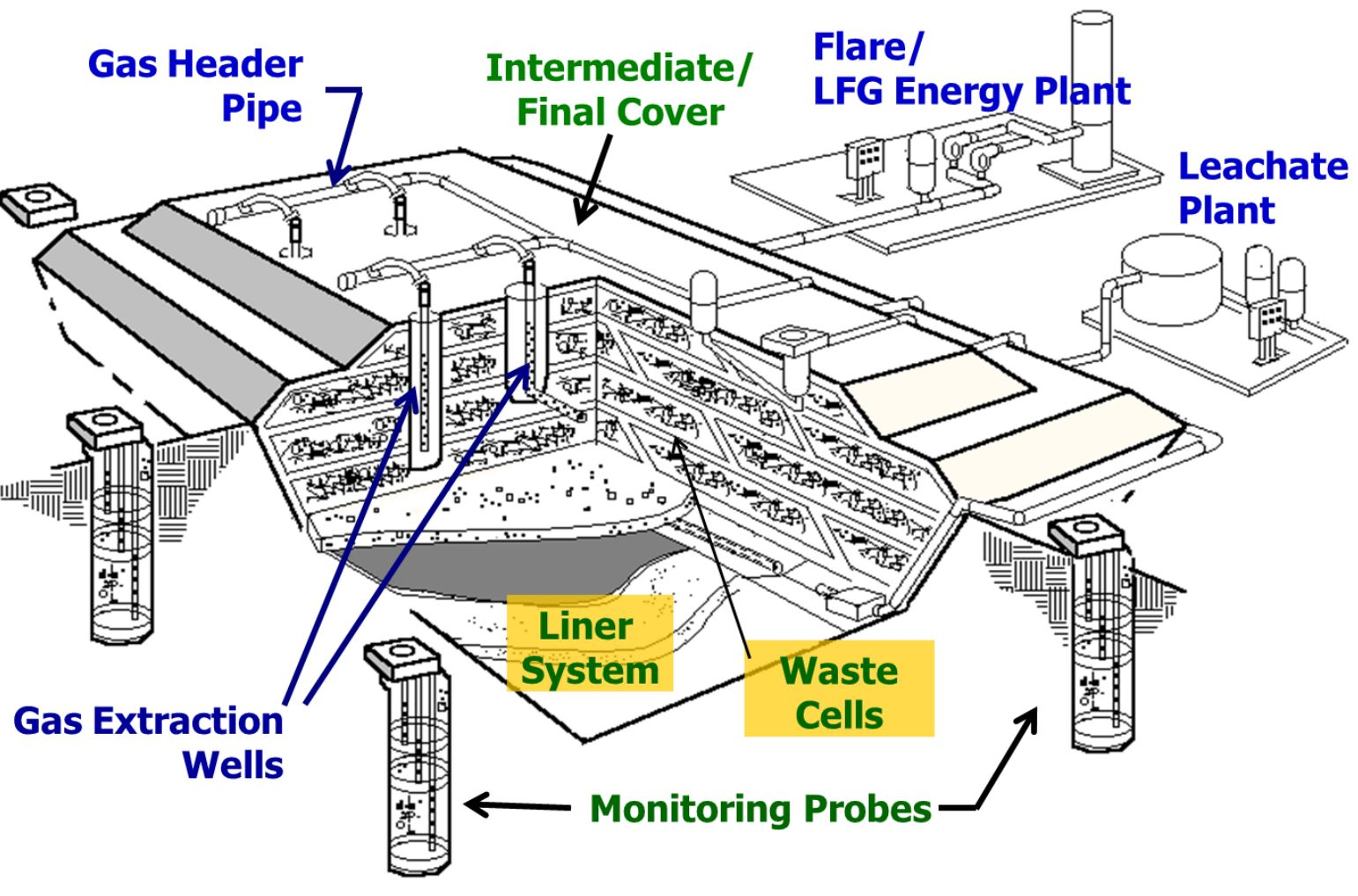
Landfill Gas Collection

Non-thermal technologies:

- Anaerobic digestion: Biogas rich in methane
- Fermentation production: examples are ethanol, lactic acid, hydrogen
- Mechanical biological treatment (MBT)
  - MBT + Anaerobic digestion
  - MBT to Refuse derived fuel

== Global developments ==
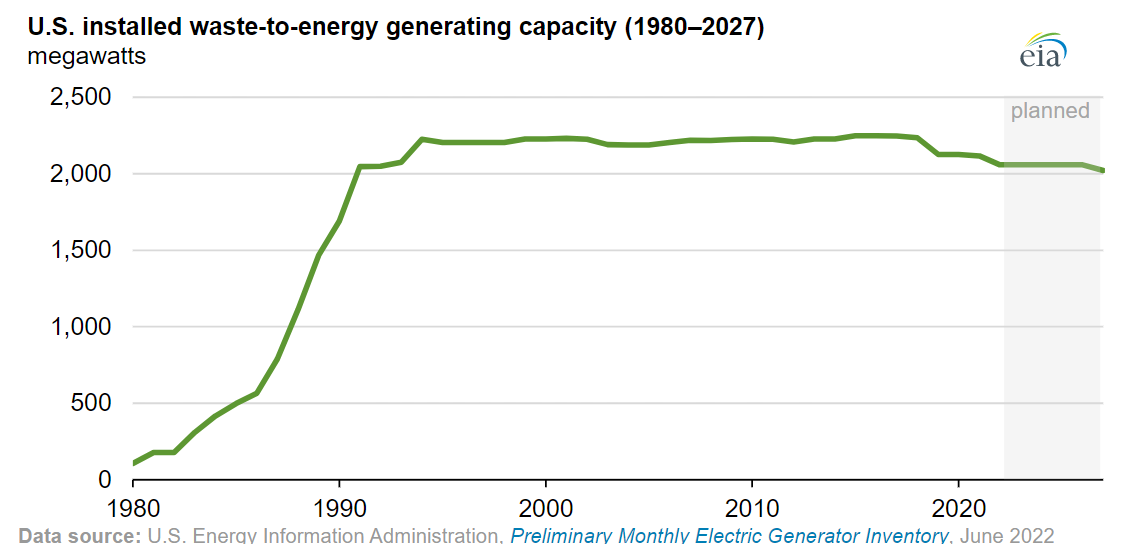
Waste-to-energy generating capacity in the United States

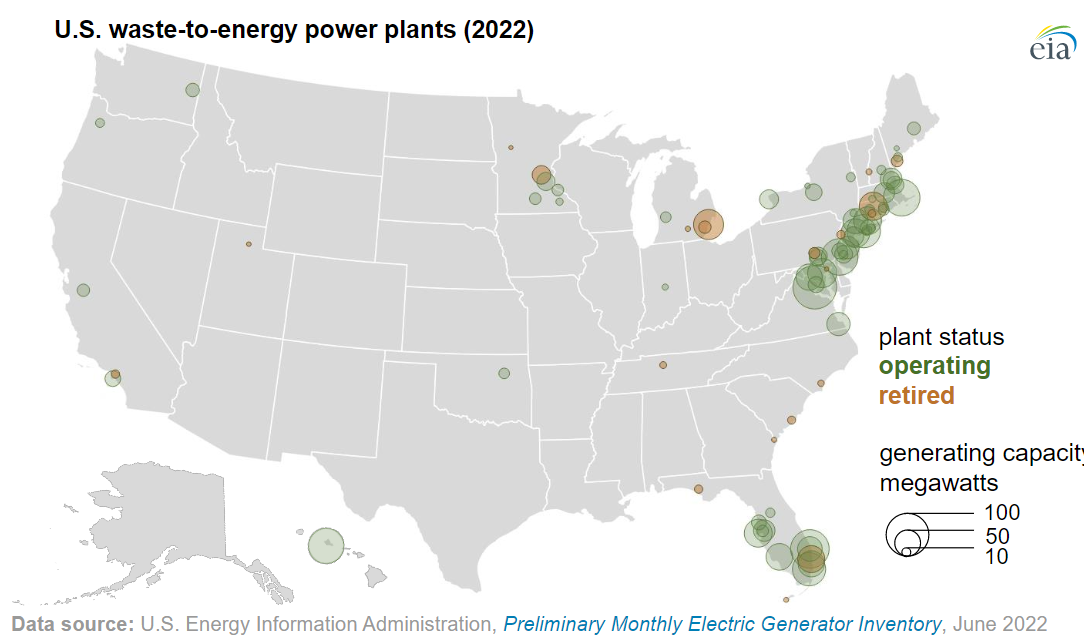
Waste-to-energy plants in the United States

During the 2001–2007 period, the waste-to-energy capacity increased by about four million metric tons per year.

Japan and China each built several plants based on direct smelting or on fluidized bed combustion of solid waste. In China there were about 434 waste-to-energy plants in early 2016. Japan is the largest user in thermal treatment of municipal solid waste in the world, with 40 million tons annually.

Some of the newest plants use stoker technology and others use the advanced oxygen enrichment technology. Several treatment plants exist worldwide using relatively novel processes such as direct smelting, the Ebara fluidization process and the Thermoselect JFE gasification and melting technology process.

As of June 2014, Indonesia had a total of 93.5 MW installed capacity of waste-to-energy, with a pipeline of projects in different preparation phases together amounting to another 373MW of capacity.

India’s first Waste-to-Energy processing facility was established by the Timarpur-Okhla Waste Management Company Pvt Ltd's (TOWMCL) in Delhi in January 2012. Per day it processes 2000 tonnes of solid waste and generates 16 MW of renewable energy. India’s first IGBC platinum-rated net-zero Green Waste-to-Energy Campus is in Jamnagar, Gujarat established by Abellon Clean energy and designed by INI Design Studio. The facility processes 2,20,000 tons/year of Municipal Solid Waste into 7.5 MW clean energy. The facility’s design involves almost no human interface during the process and also has a see-through design inside the processing plant making it an educational hub for schools and visitors. The campus uses only 20% of its land for the facility and the rest 80% is used for community activities and interactions.

Biofuel Energy Corporation of Denver, Colorado, opened two new biofuel plants in Wood River, Nebraska, and Fairmont, Minnesota, in July 2008. These plants use distillation to make ethanol for use in motor vehicles and other engines. Both plants were acquired by Green Plains in 2013. As the Fairmont plant was closed down in 2025, the Wood River plant reported to be working at 99% capacity in Q2-2025.

Fulcrum BioEnergy, which started in 2007 in Pleasanton, California, built a WtE plant near Reno, NV to convert waste to sustainable aviation fuel (SAF). The plant was in commissioning from 2022 to May 2024 under the name Sierra BioFuels. Fulcrum predicted that the plant would produce approximately 10.5 million gallons per year of Fischer-Tropsch products from nearly 200,000 tons per year of MSW. The total exported product amounted to just 350 gallons of syncrude which were transported to Marathon Petroleum's refinery for conversion into jet fuel. The plant had issues including damage from unexpected generation of nitric acid and deposits of a concrete-like substance up to 10 feet thick in its gasification system. In 2024 Fulcrum BioEnergy ceased operations at the plant after defaulting on $290 million bonds issued through the Nevada Department of Business and Industry used to fund the plant's construction.

Waste-to-energy technology includes fermentation, which can take biomass and create ethanol, using waste cellulosic or organic material. In the fermentation process, the sugar in the waste is converted to carbon dioxide and alcohol, in the same general process that is used to make wine. Normally fermentation occurs with no air present.

Esterification can also be done using waste-to-energy technologies, and the result of this process is biodiesel. The cost-effectiveness of esterification will depend on the feedstock being used, and all the other relevant factors such as transportation distance, amount of oil present in the feedstock, and others. Gasification and pyrolysis by now can reach gross thermal conversion efficiencies (fuel to gas) up to 75%, however, a complete combustion is superior in terms of fuel conversion efficiency. Some pyrolysis processes need an outside heat source which may be supplied by the gasification process, making the combined process self-sustaining.

== Region ==
=== Europe ===
The waste-to-energy (WtE) sector in Europe has evolved from a capacity-driven infrastructure model to a more regulated and performance-oriented market. In recent years, emphasis has shifted toward compliance with stricter environmental standards, integration with district heating systems, and improved residue management strategies.

In addition, the sector is influenced by evolving regulatory frameworks, including emissions standards and carbon pricing mechanisms. Proposed expansions of the European Union Emissions Trading System (ETS) to include waste incineration are expected to further impact operational economics and investment decisions in the WtE industry.

Despite its role in reducing landfill dependency, the waste-to-energy sector in Europe remains subject to debate. Critics argue that reliance on incineration may discourage recycling and circular economy practices, while proponents highlight its contribution to energy recovery and waste volume reduction. As a result, future development of the sector is expected to balance energy generation with stricter sustainability and recycling targets.

== Carbon dioxide emissions ==
In thermal WtE technologies, nearly all of the carbon content in the waste is emitted as carbon dioxide (CO_{2}) to the atmosphere (when including final combustion of the products from pyrolysis and gasification; except when producing biochar for fertilizer). Municipal solid waste (MSW) contain approximately the same mass fraction of carbon as CO_{2} itself (27%), so treatment of 1 metric ton (1.1 short tons) of MSW produce approximately 1 metric ton (1.1 short tons) of CO_{2}.

In the event that the waste was landfilled, 1 metric ton (1.1 short tons) of MSW would produce approximately 62 cubic metres (2,200 cu ft) methane via the anaerobic decomposition of the biodegradable part of the waste. This amount of methane has more than twice the global warming potential than the 1 metric ton (1.1 short tons) of CO_{2}, which would have been produced by combustion. In some countries, large amounts of landfill gas are collected. However, there is still the global warming potential of the landfill gas being emitted to atmosphere. For example, in the US in 1999 landfill gas emission was approximately 32% higher than the amount of CO_{2} that would have been emitted by combustion.

In addition, nearly all biodegradable waste is biomass. That is, it has biological origin. This material has been formed by plants using atmospheric CO_{2} typically within the last growing season. If these plants are regrown the CO_{2} emitted from their combustion will be taken out from the atmosphere once more.

Such considerations are the main reason why several countries administrate WtE of the biomass part of waste as renewable energy. The rest—mainly plastics and other oil and gas derived products—is generally treated as non-renewables.

The CO_{2} emissions from plastic waste-to-energy systems are higher than those from current fossil fuel-based power systems per unit of power generated, even after considering the contribution of carbon capture and storage. Power generation using plastic waste will significantly increase by 2050. Carbon must be separated during energy recovery processes. Otherwise, the fight against global warming would fail due to plastic waste.

=== Determination of the biomass fraction ===
MSW to a large extent is of biological origin (biogenic), e.g. paper, cardboard, wood, cloth, food scraps. Typically half of the energy content in MSW is from biogenic material. Consequently, this energy is often recognised as renewable energy according to the waste input.

Several methods have been developed by the European CEN 343 working group to determine the biomass fraction of waste fuels, such as Refuse Derived Fuel/Solid Recovered Fuel. The initial two methods developed (CEN/TS 15440) were the manual sorting method and the selective dissolution method. A detailed systematic comparison of these two methods was published in 2010. Since each method suffered from limitations in properly characterizing the biomass fraction, two alternative methods have been developed.

The first method uses the principles of radiocarbon dating. A technical review (CEN/TR 15591:2007) outlining the carbon 14 method was published in 2007. A technical standard of the carbon dating method (CEN/TS 15747:2008) was published in 2008. In the United States, there is already an equivalent carbon 14 method under the standard method ASTM D6866.

The second method (so-called balance method) employs existing data on materials composition and operating conditions of the WtE plant and calculates the most probable result based on a mathematical-statistical model. Currently the balance method is installed at three Austrian and eight Danish incinerators.

A comparison between both methods carried out at three full-scale incinerators in Switzerland showed that both methods came to the same results.

Carbon 14 dating can determine with precision the biomass fraction of waste, and also determine the biomass calorific value. Determining the calorific value is important for green certificate programs such as the Renewable Obligation Certificate program in the United Kingdom. These programs award certificates based on the energy produced from biomass. Several research papers, including the one commissioned by the Renewable Energy Association in the UK, have been published that demonstrate how the carbon 14 result can be used to calculate the biomass calorific value. The UK gas and electricity markets authority, Ofgem, released a statement in 2011 accepting the use of Carbon 14 as a way to determine the biomass energy content of waste feedstock under their administration of the Renewables Obligation. Their Fuel Measurement and Sampling (FMS) questionnaire describes the information they look for when considering such proposals.

== Physical location ==
A 2019 report commissioned by the Global Alliance for Incinerator Alternatives (GAIA), done by the Tishman Environment and Design Center at The New School, found that 79% of the then 73 operating waste-to-energy facilities in the U.S. are located in low-income communities and/or "communities of color", because "of historic residential, racial segregation and expulsive zoning laws that allowed whiter, wealthier communities to exclude industrial uses and people of color from their boundaries." In Chester, Pennsylvania, where a community group is actively opposing their local waste-to-energy facility, Sintana Vergara, an assistant professor in the Department of Environmental Resources Engineering at Humboldt State University in California, commented that community resistance is based on both the pollution and the fact that many of these facilities have been sited in communities without any community input, and without any benefits to the community.

In other countries WtE facilities are located adjacent to residental housing without significant conflicts, also in high-income areas. One prominent example is Amager Bakke in central Copenhagen, Denmark

== Notable examples ==
According to a 2019 United Nations Environment Programme report, there are 589 WtE plants in Europe and 82 in the United States.

The following are some examples of WtE plants.

=== Waste incineration WtE plants ===
- Essex County Resource Recovery Facility, Newark, New Jersey
- Harrisburg incinerator, Harrisburg, Pennsylvania
- Lee County Solid Waste Resource Recovery Facility, Fort Myers, Florida, USA (1994)
- Montgomery County Resource Recovery Facility in Dickerson, Maryland, USA (1995)
- Spittelau (1971), and Flötzersteig (1963), Vienna, Austria (Wien Energie)
- SYSAV waste-to-energy plant in Malmö (2003 and 2008), Sweden
- Algonquin Power, Brampton, Ontario, Canada
- Stoke Incinerator, Stoke-on-Trent, UK (1989)
- Delaware Valley Resource Recovery Facility, Chester, United States
- Teesside EfW plant near Middlesbrough, North East England (1998)
- Edmonton Incinerator in Greater London, England (1974)
- Burnaby Waste-to-Energy Facility, Metro Vancouver, Canada (1988)
- Timarpur-Okhla Waste to Energy Plant, New Delhi, India
- East Delhi Waste Processing Company Limited, New Delhi, India
- SELCHP, South Bermondsey in Greater London, England (1994)

=== Liquid fuel producing plants ===
No industrial liquid fuel producing gasification plants are currently operational, but two are under erection/commissioning in Varennes (CA) and Swindon (UK).

=== Plasma gasification waste-to-energy plants ===
The US Air Force once tested a Transportable Plasma Waste to Energy System (TPWES) facility (PyroGenesis technology) at Hurlburt Field, Florida. The plant, which cost $7.4 million to construct, was closed and sold at a government liquidation auction in May 2013, less than three years after its commissioning. The opening bid was $25. The winning bid was sealed.

Besides large plants, domestic waste-to-energy incinerators also exist. For example, the Refuge de Sarenne has a domestic waste-to-energy plant. It is made by combining a wood-fired gasification boiler with a Stirling motor.

=== Australia ===
Renergi will scale up their system of converting waste organic materials into liquid fuels using a thermal treatment process in Collie, Western Australia. The system will process 1.5 tonnes of organic matter per hour. Annually the facility will divert 4000 tonnes of municipal waste from landfill and source an additional 8000 tonnes of organic waste from agricultural and forestry operations. Renergi’s patented “grinding pyrolysis” process aims to converts organic materials into biochar, bio-gases and bio-oil by applying heat in an environment with limited oxygen.

Another project in the Rockingham Industrial Zone, roughly 45 kilometres south of Perth will see a 29 MW plant built with capacity to power 40,000 homes from an annual feedstock of 300,000 tonnes of municipal, industrial and commercial rubbish. As well as supplying electricity to the South West Interconnected System, 25 MW of the plant’s output has already been committed under a power purchase agreement.

=== Africa ===
The Reppie waste to energy plant in Ethiopia was the first such plant in Africa. The plant became operational in 2018.

== See also ==
- Alternative fuels – Fuels from sources other than fossil fuels
- Biogas – Gases produced by decomposing organic matter
- Biohydrogen production – Hydrogen that is produced biologically
- Cogeneration – Simultaneous generation of electricity and useful heat
- Energy recycling – Process of using energy that would normally be wasted
- Landfill gas utilization – Method of producing electricity
- List of solid waste treatment technologies
- List of waste management acronyms
- Manure-derived synthetic crude oil – Synthetic bio-oil converted from manure
- Plastic pollution – Accumulation of plastic in natural ecosystems
- Refuse-derived fuel – Extracted combustible fraction of municipal and other solid waste
- Relative cost of electricity generated by different sources – Comparison of costs of different electricity generation sources
- Reuse of human excreta – Safe, beneficial use of human excreta mainly in agriculture (after treatment)
- Waste-to-energy plant – Building that incinerates waste to produce energy
