= New Forest District Council elections =

Class of election in the United Kingdom

New Forest District Council elections are held every four years to elect members of New Forest District Council in Hampshire, England. Since the last boundary changes in 2023 the council has comprised 48 councillors representing 26 wards, with each ward electing one, two or three councillors.

== Results ==
Composition of the council
Year	Conservative	Labour	Liberal Democrats (Note: Includes totals for the predecessors of the Liberal Democrats, the Liberal Party and SDP (both of which participated in the Alliance).)	Green (Note: Includes totals for the predecessors of the Green Party of England and Wales, the Ecology Party and Green Party UK.)	Independents & Others	Council control after election
Local government reorganisation; council established (60 seats)
1973	13	1	7		39	Independent
New ward boundaries (58 seats)
1976	32	0	5	0	21	Conservative
1979	33	0	4	0	21	Conservative
1983	40	1	4	0	13	Conservative
1987	33	0	18	0	7	Conservative
1991	23	0	29	0	6	No overall control
1995	23	0	32	0	3	Liberal Democrats
1999	30	0	25	0	3	Conservative
New ward boundaries (60 seats)
2003	32	0	27	0	1	Conservative
2007	45	0	14	0	1	Conservative
2011	54	0	6	0	0	Conservative
2015	58	0	2	0	0	Conservative
2019	46	0	13	0	1	Conservative
New ward boundaries (48 seats)
2023	26	1	14	3	4	Conservative

== Council elections ==
- 1973 New Forest District Council election
- 1976 New Forest District Council election (New ward boundaries)
- 1979 New Forest District Council election (District boundary changes took place but the number of seats remained the same)
- 1983 New Forest District Council election
- 1987 New Forest District Council election
- 1991 New Forest District Council election
- 1995 New Forest District Council election (District boundary changes took place but the number of seats remained the same)
- 1999 New Forest District Council election
- 2003 New Forest District Council election (New ward boundaries increased the number of seats by 2)
- 2007 New Forest District Council election
- 2011 New Forest District Council election (Some new ward boundaries)
- 2015 New Forest District Council election
- 2019 New Forest District Council election
- 2023 New Forest District Council election (New ward boundaries)

== District results map ==
2003 results map

2007 results map

2011 results map

2015 results map

2019 results map

2023 results map

== By-election results ==
=== 1995-1999 ===
Ringwood North By-Election 17 September 1998
Party	Candidate	Votes	%	±%
Conservative	John Waddington	503	61.6	+21.4
Liberal Democrats	Veronica Sullivan	313	38.4	+1.4
Majority		190	23.2	
Turnout		816	21.1	
Conservative hold		Swing		

=== 1999-2003 ===
Bashley By-Election 7 June 2001
Party	Candidate	Votes	%	±%
Conservative	Jill Cleary	2,186	57.1	−7.5
Liberal Democrats	Margaret Newlands	1,638	42.8	+21.3
Majority		548	14.3	
Turnout		3,824	59.7	
Conservative hold		Swing		

Becton By-Election 22 November 2001
Party	Candidate	Votes	%	±%
Conservative	Godfrey Beck	692	61.0	−7.6
Liberal Democrats	Margaret Newlands	442	39.0	+7.6
Majority		250	22.0	
Turnout		1,134	21.5	
Conservative hold		Swing		

Milford By-Election 21 February 2002
Party	Candidate	Votes	%	±%
Conservative	Brian Pemberton	781	74.0	+2.4
Liberal Democrats	Jasqueline Szwaczka	275	26.0	+8.7
Majority		506	48.0	
Turnout		1,056	25.6	
Conservative hold		Swing		

Pennington By-Election 21 February 2002
Party	Candidate	Votes	%	±%
Liberal Democrats	Paul Hickman	1,079	70.6	+25.4
Conservative	Penelope Beasley	449	29.4	−11.2
Majority		630	41.2	
Turnout		1,528	34.8	
Liberal Democrats gain from Conservative		Swing		

Ringwood North By-Election 21 February 2002
Party	Candidate	Votes	%	±%
Conservative	Lorna Ford	337	47.5	−13.2
Independent	Stephen Wright	203	28.6	+28.6
Liberal Democrats	Peter Chambers	169	23.8	−2.0
Majority		134	18.9	
Turnout		709	18.2	
Conservative hold		Swing		

=== 2003-2007 ===
Holbury and North Blackfield By-Election 5 February 2004
Party	Candidate	Votes	%	±%
Liberal Democrats	Lee Dunsdon	772	75.2	+3.5
Conservative	Robert Wappet	210	20.4	−7.9
Labour	Philip Annette	45	4.4	+4.4
Majority		562	54.8	
Turnout		1,027	21.4	
Liberal Democrats hold		Swing		

Ringwood East & Sopley By-Election 5 May 2005
Party	Candidate	Votes	%	±%
Conservative	Christopher Treleaven	953	64.4	−11.6
Liberal Democrats	Peter Chambers	527	35.6	+11.6
Majority		426	28.8	
Turnout		1,480	68.8	
Conservative hold		Swing		

Totton West By-Election 20 July 2006
Party	Candidate	Votes	%	±%
Liberal Democrats	Leonard Harris	535	48.1	+0.3
Conservative	Diana Brooks	498	44.8	−7.4
Labour	Alan Goodfellow	79	7.1	+7.1
Majority		37	3.3	
Turnout		1,112	28.5	
Liberal Democrats gain from Conservative		Swing		

Barton By-Election 25 January 2007
Party	Candidate	Votes	%	±%
Conservative	Frances Carpenter	990	56.9	−16.7
Liberal Democrats	Wynford Davies	426	24.5	−1.9
Independent	Jeremy May	277	15.9	+15.9
Labour	Peter Dance	48	2.8	+2.8
Majority		564	32.4	
Turnout		1,741	36.7	
Conservative hold		Swing		

=== 2007-2011 ===
The 2007 Brahmshaw, Copythorne Noorth and Minstead By-Election was held after a candidate for the 2007 local election died, postponing the election for that ward.

Bramshaw, Copythorne North and Minstead By-Election 14 June 2007
Party	Candidate	Votes	%	±%
Conservative	Henry Forse	436	78.0	+4.9
Liberal Democrats	Anthony Gray	123	22.0	−4.9
Majority		313	56.0	
Turnout		559	26.2	
Conservative hold		Swing		

Ringwood South By-Election 19 June 2008
Party	Candidate	Votes	%	±%
Conservative	Jeremy Heron	610	58.6	+25.1
Liberal Democrats	Peter Chambers	354	32.9	+12.3
Labour	Peter Harper	113	10.5	+1.6
Majority		256	25.7	
Turnout		1,077	23.3	
Conservative gain from Independent		Swing		

=== 2011-2015 ===
Milford By-Election 19 July 2012
Party	Candidate	Votes	%	±%
Conservative	Sophie Beeton	963	80.0	+1.4
Labour	Caroline Hexter	240	20.0	−1.4
Majority		723	60.0	
Turnout		1,203		
Conservative hold		Swing		

Bransgore and Burley By-Election 11 December 2014
Party	Candidate	Votes	%	±%
Conservative	Richard Frampton	834	77.3	+11.3
UKIP	Roz Mills	171	15.8	+15.8
Labour	Brian Curwain	74	6.9	−7.3
Majority		663	61.4	
Turnout		1,079		
Conservative hold		Swing		

=== 2015-2019 ===
Milford By-Election 5 April 2018
Party	Candidate	Votes	%	±%
Conservative	Christine Hopkins	1,057	76.4	−3.3
Liberal Democrats	Wynford Davies	200	14.5	+14.5
Labour	Sally Spicer	126	9.1	−11.2
Majority		857	62.0	
Turnout		1,383		
Conservative hold		Swing		

Fawley, Blackfield and Langley By-Election 26 July 2018
Party	Candidate	Votes	%	±%
Conservative	Merv Langdale	736	58.4	+15.8
Liberal Democrats	Craig Fletcher	525	41.6	+27.3
Majority		211	16.8	
Turnout		1,261		
Conservative hold		Swing		

Pennington By-Election 13 September 2018
Party	Candidate	Votes	%	±%
Conservative	Andrew Gossage	497	42.0	−10.1
Liberal Democrats	Jack Davies	445	37.6	+8.8
Independent	Ted Jearrad	144	12.2	+12.2
Labour	Trina Hart	97	8.2	−10.9
Majority		52	4.4	
Turnout		1,183		
Conservative hold		Swing		

=== 2019-2023 ===
Bransgore and Burley By-Election 23 December 2021
Party	Candidate	Votes	%	±%
Independent	Richard Frampton	617	44.3	+44.3
Green	Lucy Bramley	459	33.0	+33.0
Conservative	Sarah Howard	258	18.5	−53.7
Labour	James Swyer	59	4.2	−23.6
Majority		158	11.3	
Turnout		1,393		
Independent gain from Conservative		Swing		

Hythe West and Langdown By-Election 3 March 2022
Party	Candidate	Votes	%	±%
Liberal Democrats	Sean Cullen	559	44.6	−23.3
Conservative	Terri Marwood	497	39.7	+7.6
Labour	James Gallagher	153	12.2	+12.2
Independent	Matthew Kitcher	44	3.5	+3.5
Majority		62	4.9	
Turnout		1,253		
Liberal Democrats hold		Swing		

=== 2023-2027 ===
Barton and Becton By-Election 24 October 2024
Party	Candidate	Votes	%	±%
Conservative	John Adams	671	57.1	
Liberal Democrats	Wynford Davies	505	42.9	
Majority		166	14.1	
Turnout		1,176		
Conservative hold		Swing		

Bransgore, Burley, Sopley and Ringwood East By-Election 13 February 2025
Party	Candidate	Votes	%	±%
Conservative	Richard Frampton	997	60.0	
Green	Barbara Czoch	314	18.9	
Reform	Adam Elcock	257	15.5	
Liberal Democrats	Iestyn Lewis	52	3.1	
Labour	Sally Johnston	42	2.5	
Majority		683	41.1	
Turnout		1,662		
Conservative gain from Green		Swing		

Bransgore, Burley, Sopley and Ringwood East By-Election 18 June 2026
Party	Candidate	Votes	%	±%
Conservative	Jan Sutherland	696	39.3	−20.7
Green	Barbara Czoch	459	25.9	+7.0
Reform	Jannette Westgate	452	25.5	+10.0
Liberal Democrats	Hannah Phillips	126	7.1	+4.0
Labour	Bronwen Bridges	38	2.1	−0.4
Majority		237	13.4	
Turnout		1,771		
Conservative hold		Swing		
