= Alexander Bell =

Alexander, Alex or Lex Bell may refer to:

== People ==
- Alexander Bell (California merchant) (1801–1871), member of the Los Angeles Common Council
- Alexander Montgomerie Bell (1806–1866), Scottish writer on law
- Alexander Melville Bell (1819–1905), Scottish-American philologist, researcher, teacher, and father of Alexander Graham Bell
- Alexander Graham Bell (1847–1922), Scottish-Canadian scientist, engineer, teacher and inventor
- Alexander Bell (Victorian politician) (1850–1931), Australian politician
- Alexander Dunlop Bell (1873–1937), Chairman of the Shanghai Municipal Council, 1932–1934
- Alexander Bell (sportsman) (1915–1956), Argentine born English cricketer and rugby union player
- Alexander F. Bell (1915–1986), American football player for the Detroit Lions and head college football coach at Villanova University
- Alex Bell (1882–1934), Scottish footballer (Manchester United, Blackburn Rovers, Scotland)
- Alex Bell, Scottish footballer, see List of Bury F.C. players (1–24 appearances)
- Alex Bell (footballer, born 1931), Scottish footballer (Partick Thistle, Exeter City, Grimsby Town)
- Alex Bell (athlete) (born 1992), British athlete
- Alex Bell (writer) (born 1986), English author also known as Alexandra Bell
- Lex Bell (Alexander James Douglas Bell, born 1945), Australian politician
- Sandy Bell (Alexander John Bell, 1906–1985), South African cricketer

== Characters ==
- Alex Bell (Hollyoaks), a character in the British soap opera Hollyoaks

== See also ==
- Alexander Bell Patterson (1911–1993), Canadian MP
