= 2003 New Forest District Council election =

2003 UK local government election

← 1999	1 May 2003	2007 →

All 60 seats to New Forest District Council 31 seats needed for a majority
	First party	Second party	Third party
Party	Conservative	Liberal Democrats	Independent
Seats before	29	26	3
Seats won	32	27	1
Seat change	▲3	▲1	▼2
Popular vote	23,803	18,712	2,723
- Results by Ward
Council control before election
Conservative
Council control after election
Conservative

The 2003 New Forest District Council election took place on 1 May 2003 to elect members to the New Forest District Council, on the same day as other local elections. The 2003 election saw new ward boundaries used which increased the number of seats by 2 to 60. The election saw the Conservatives win 32 seats out of the 31 required for a majority, with the Liberal Democrats winning 27 seats and one independent win.

== Election Summary ==
New ward boundaries came into effect for the election, which increased the number of seats by two. Prior to the election, a by-election took place in Pennington, which saw the Liberal Democrats gaining the seat from the Conservatives, meaning that prior to the election the Conservatives held 29 seats (50.00%), the Liberal Democrats held 36 seats (44.82%) and three independents held seats (5.17%). After the election, the Conservatives held 32 seats (53.33%) and the Liberal Democrats held 27 (45.00%), with only one independent hold (1.66%)

The Liberal Democrats performed best in the East of the district, as well as the North West, taking eight out of ten Totton seats, all six Hythe and Dibden seats, and all four seats in the Fawley, Blackfield and Holbury area. The Conservatives meanwhile performed well across the rest of the district.

The table below only tallies the votes of the highest polling candidate for each party within each ward. This is known as the top candidate method and is often used for multi-member plurality elections.

New Forest local election result 2003
Party	Seats	Gains	Losses	Net gain/loss	Seats %	Votes %	Votes	+/−
Conservative	32	17	1	▲3	53.33	51.49	23,803	
Liberal Democrats	27	22	0	▲1	45.00	40.48	18,712	
Independent	1	0	2	▼2	1.66	5.89	2,723	
Labour	0	0	0	Steady	0	1.61	745	
Green	0	0	0	Steady	0	0.26	124	
UKIP	0	0	0	Steady	0	0.25	117	

== Ward Results ==
=== Ashurst, Copythorne South and Netley Marsh ===
Ashurst, Copythorne South and Netley Marsh (2)
Party	Candidate	Votes	%	±%
Conservative	Derek Tipp	829	45.64	
Conservative	Leslie Puttock	827		
Liberal Democrats	Anthony Gray	421	23.18	
Liberal Democrats	Peter Keeley	412		
Labour	Peter Sopowski	290	15.96	
Independent	Jeannette Brownsea	276	15.19	
Majority		408	22.46	
Turnout		1,816		
Conservative win (new seat)				
Conservative win (new seat)				

=== Barton ===
Barton (2)
Party	Candidate	Votes	%	±%
Conservative	Kenneth Austin	1,261	73.61	
Conservative	John Hutchins	1,255		
Liberal Democrats	Paul Chatfield	452	26.38	
Liberal Democrats	Nicholas McGeorge	378		
Majority		809	47.22	
Turnout		1,713		
Conservative win (new seat)				
Conservative win (new seat)				

=== Bashley ===
Bashley
Party	Candidate	Votes	%	±%
Conservative	Alan Rice	710	79.32	
Liberal Democrats	Anne Jenks	120	13.40	
Independent	Ken Duffy	65	7.26	
Majority		590	65.92	
Turnout		895		
Conservative win (new seat)				

=== Becton ===
Becton (2)
Party	Candidate	Votes	%	±%
Conservative	Godfrey Beck	922	72.31	
Conservative	Paul Woods	894		
Liberal Democrats	John Burton	353	27.68	
Liberal Democrats	Margaret Newlands	344		
Majority		569	44.62	
Turnout		1,275		
Conservative win (new seat)				
Conservative win (new seat)				

=== Boldre and Sway ===
Boldre and Sway (2)
Party	Candidate	Votes	%	±%
Conservative	Barry Rickman	1,343	71.81	
Conservative	Colin Wise	1,154		
Liberal Democrats	Susan Lewis	388	20.74	
Liberal Democrats	Freda Angelou	276		
Labour	Peter Dance	139	7.43	
Majority		955	51.06	
Turnout		1,870		
Conservative win (new seat)				
Conservative win (new seat)				

=== Bramshaw, Copythorne North and Minstead ===
Bramshaw, Copythorne North and Minstead
Party	Candidate	Votes	%	±%
Conservative	David Scott	579	73.10	
Liberal Democrats	Judith Baker	213	26.89	
Majority		366	46.21	
Turnout		792		
Conservative win (new seat)				

=== Bransgore and Burley ===
Bransgore and Burley (2)
Party	Candidate	Votes	%	±%
Conservative	John Penwarden	961	38.15	
Conservative	Peter Greenfield	886		
Independent	Sally Owen	880	34.93	
Liberal Democrats	Gwenneth Rickus	678	26.91	
Majority		81	3.21	
Turnout		2,519		
Conservative win (new seat)				
Conservative win (new seat)				

=== Brockenhurst and Forest South East ===
Brockenhurst and Forest South East (2)
Party	Candidate	Votes	%	±%
Conservative	Maureen Holding	1,262	73.80	
Conservative	Roger Neath	1,155		
Liberal Democrats	Rachel Kalis	448	26.19	
Liberal Democrats	Frank Jenks	330		
Majority		814	47.60	
Turnout		1,710		
Conservative win (new seat)				
Conservative win (new seat)				

=== Buckland ===
Buckland
Party	Candidate	Votes	%	±%
Liberal Democrats	Brenda Vincent	360	48.45	
Conservative	Michael Beggs	266	35.80	
UKIP	Alexander Neill	117	15.74	
Majority		94	12.65	
Turnout		743		
Liberal Democrats win (new seat)				

=== Butts Ash and Dibden Purlieu ===
Butts Ash and Dibden Purlieu (2)
Party	Candidate	Votes	%	±%
Liberal Democrats	Brenda Smith	1,081	64.61	
Liberal Democrats	Malcolm Wade	1,012		
Conservative	Brian Uglow	592	35.38	
Majority		489	29.22	
Turnout		1,673		
Liberal Democrats win (new seat)				
Liberal Democrats win (new seat)				

=== Dibden and Hythe East ===
Dibden and Hythe East (2)
Party	Candidate	Votes	%	±%
Liberal Democrats	Christopher Harrison	898	68.03	
Liberal Democrats	Stanley Wade	893		
Conservative	Beverley Thorne	422	31.96	
Conservative	Penelope Rose	410		
Majority		476	36.06	
Turnout		1,320		
Liberal Democrats win (new seat)				
Liberal Democrats win (new seat)				

=== Downlands and Forest ===
Downlands and Forest
Party	Candidate	Votes	%	±%
Liberal Democrats	Miranda Whitehead	560	47.29	
Conservative	Kathy Heron	500	42.22	
Green	Janet Richards	124	10.47	
Majority		60	5.06	
Turnout		1,184		
Liberal Democrats win (new seat)				

=== Fawley, Blackfield and Langley ===
Fawley, Blackfield and Langley (2)
Party	Candidate	Votes	%	±%
Liberal Democrats	Barbara Maynard	1,011	59.78	
Liberal Democrats	Malcolm Fidler	921		
Conservative	Alexis McEvoy	680	40.21	
Conservative	Barry Brooks	584		
Majority		331	19.57	
Turnout		1,691		
Liberal Democrats win (new seat)				
Liberal Democrats win (new seat)				

=== Fernhill ===
Fernhill (2)
Party	Candidate	Votes	%	±%
Conservative	Jill Cleary	802	64.52	
Conservative	Sheila Snowden	752		
Liberal Democrats	Beverly Scott-Johns	441	35.47	
Liberal Democrats	Wendy Hedge	411		
Majority		814	29.04	
Turnout		1,243		
Conservative win (new seat)				
Conservative win (new seat)				

=== Fordingbridge ===
Fordingbridge (2)
Party	Candidate	Votes	%	±%
Liberal Democrats	Robert Hale	1,481	68.12	
Liberal Democrats	Michael Shand	1,376		
Conservative	Roger Kernan	693	31.87	
Majority		788	36.24	
Turnout		2,174		
Liberal Democrats win (new seat)				
Liberal Democrats win (new seat)				

=== Forest North West ===
Forest North West
Party	Candidate	Votes	%	±%
Conservative	Bill Dow	565	60.75	
Liberal Democrats	John Stokes	365	39.24	
Majority		200	21.50	
Turnout		930		
Conservative win (new seat)				

=== Furzedown and Hardley ===
Furzedown and Hardley
Party	Candidate	Votes	%	±%
Liberal Democrats	Graham Parkes	565	72.30	
Conservative	Michael Curry	167	27.69	
Majority		269	44.61	
Turnout		603		
Liberal Democrats win (new seat)				

=== Holbury and North Blackfield ===
Holbury and North Blackfield (2)
Party	Candidate	Votes	%	±%
Liberal Democrats	John Coles	802	71.67	
Liberal Democrats	Colin Baker	754		
Conservative	Olivia Foster	317	28.32	
Conservative	Robert Wappet	295		
Majority		331	19.57	
Turnout		1,691		
Liberal Democrats win (new seat)				
Liberal Democrats win (new seat)				

=== Hordle ===
Hordle (2)
Party	Candidate	Votes	%	±%
Conservative	John Hoy	953	50.18	
Conservative	Andrew Tinsley	699		
Independent	Ernest Bowring	685	36.07	
Liberal Democrats	Penelope Senior	261	13.74	
Liberal Democrats	Jacqueline Szwaczka	203		
Majority		268	14.11	
Turnout		1,899		
Conservative win (new seat)				
Conservative win (new seat)				

=== Hythe West and Langdown ===
Hythe West and Langdown (2)
Party	Candidate	Votes	%	±%
Liberal Democrats	Maureen McLean	1,173	71.52	
Liberal Democrats	Maureen Robinson	1,172		
Conservative	John Hall-Say	467	28.47	
Conservative	Martin Wood	443		
Majority		706	43.04	
Turnout		1,640		
Liberal Democrats win (new seat)				
Liberal Democrats win (new seat)				

=== Lymington Town ===
Lymington Town (2)
Party	Candidate	Votes	%	±%
Conservative	Kevin Ault	1,264	70.85	
Conservative	Thomas Russell	1,153		
Liberal Democrats	Sally May	520	29.14	
Liberal Democrats	Edward Jearrad	480		
Majority		744	41.70	
Turnout		1,784		
Conservative win (new seat)				
Conservative win (new seat)				

=== Lyndhurst ===
Lyndhurst
Party	Candidate	Votes	%	±%
Conservative	Patricia Wyeth	630	70.62	
Liberal Democrats	William Croydon	159	17.82	
Labour	Kenneth Kershaw	103	11.54	
Majority		471	52.80	
Turnout		892		
Conservative win (new seat)				

=== Marchwood ===
Marchwood (2)
Party	Candidate	Votes	%	±%
Liberal Democrats	Graham Walmsley	701	58.07	
Liberal Democrats	Linda Snashall	586		
Conservative	Frakn Vickers	506	41.92	
Conservative	Alan Shotter	502		
Majority		195	16.15	
Turnout		1,207		
Liberal Democrats win (new seat)				
Liberal Democrats win (new seat)				

=== Milford ===
Milford (2)
Party	Candidate	Votes	%	±%
Conservative	Melville Kendal	1,371	75.91	
Conservative	Brian Pemberton	1,274		
Liberal Democrats	Roger Hedge	435	24.08	
Liberal Democrats	Clifford Lewis	354		
Majority		936	51.82	
Turnout		1,806		
Conservative win (new seat)				
Conservative win (new seat)				

=== Milton ===
Milton (2)
Party	Candidate	Votes	%	±%
Conservative	Ben Rule	1,073	63.52	
Conservative	John Ward	1,033		
Liberal Democrats	Benjamin Earwicker	616	36.47	
Liberal Democrats	Wynford Davies	570		
Majority		467	27.64	
Turnout		1,689		
Conservative win (new seat)				
Conservative win (new seat)				

=== Pennington ===
Pennington (2)
Party	Candidate	Votes	%	±%
Liberal Democrats	Paul Hickman	848	52.34	
Liberal Democrats	Martina Humber	814		
Conservative	Penelope Beasley	509	31.41	
Conservative	Jacci Rhodes-Jury	378		
Independent	Michael Thorp	263	16.23	
Majority		339	20.92	
Turnout		1,620		
Liberal Democrats win (new seat)				
Liberal Democrats win (new seat)				

=== Ringwood East and Sopley ===
Ringwood East and Sopley
Party	Candidate	Votes	%	±%
Conservative	Patricia Drake	472	76.00	
Liberal Democrats	Peter Newlands	149	23.99	
Majority		323	52.01	
Turnout		621		
Conservative win (new seat)				

=== Ringwood North ===
Ringwood North (2)
Party	Candidate	Votes	%	±%
Conservative	Michael Thierry	602	62.38	
Conservative	Lorna Ford	600		
Liberal Democrats	Malcolm Connolly	363	37.61	
Liberal Democrats	Peter Kinnison	341		
Majority		239	24.76	
Turnout		965		
Conservative win (new seat)				
Conservative win (new seat)				

=== Ringwood South ===
Ringwood South (2)
Party	Candidate	Votes	%	±%
Conservative	Jeremy Heron	615	44.11	
Independent	Daniel Cracknell	554	39.74	
Independent	Belinda Charlton	356		
Liberal Democrats	Peter Chambers	225	16.14	
Liberal Democrats	Veronica Sullivan	218		
Majority		408	22.46	
Turnout		1,816		
Conservative win (new seat)				
Independent win (new seat)				

=== Totton Central ===
Totton Central (2)
Party	Candidate	Votes	%	±%
Liberal Democrats	Stephen Shepherd	497	43.52	
Liberal Democrats	George Dart	492		
Conservative	Ronnie Belfitt	432	37.82	
Conservative	Christopher Lagdon	428		
Labour	Alan Goodfellow	213	18.65	
Majority		65	5.69	
Turnout		1,142		
Liberal Democrats win (new seat)				
Liberal Democrats win (new seat)				

=== Totton East ===
Totton East (2)
Party	Candidate	Votes	%	±%
Liberal Democrats	Frank Harrison	657	51.04	
Liberal Democrats	Graham Abbott	643		
Conservative	Frank Bright	630	48.95	
Conservative	Diana Brooks	602		
Majority		27	2.09	
Turnout		1,287		
Liberal Democrats win (new seat)				
Liberal Democrats win (new seat)				

=== Totton North ===
Totton North (2)
Party	Candidate	Votes	%	±%
Liberal Democrats	Neal Scott	424	51.14	
Conservative	Melvyn Molyneux	405	48.85	
Conservative	Marion Emery	377		
Liberal Democrats	Pauline Watkins	377		
Turnout		829		
Liberal Democrats win (new seat)				
Conservative win (new seat)				

=== Totton South ===
Totton South (2)
Party	Candidate	Votes	%	±%
Liberal Democrats	David Harrison	759	58.11	
Liberal Democrats	Alan Weeks	678		
Conservative	William Catt	547	41.88	
Conservative	George Kilford	511		
Majority		212	16.23	
Turnout		1306,		
Liberal Democrats win (new seat)				
Liberal Democrats win (new seat)				

=== Totton West ===
Totton West (2)
Party	Candidate	Votes	%	±%
Conservative	David Hibbert	456	52.23	
Liberal Democrats	David Russell	417	47.76	
Liberal Democrats	Leonard Harris	414	47.42	
Conservative	Christopher Webb	403		
Turnout		873		
Conservative win (new seat)				
Liberal Democrats win (new seat)				
