= Dinsdale =

Dinsdale may refer to:

== Places ==
- Dinsdale, formerly a common name of Low Dinsdale, a village in County Durham, England
  - Dinsdale railway station, serving Low Dinsdale and Middleton St George
  - Dinsdale Park, a house and former hotel at Low Dinsdale
  - Over Dinsdale, a village in North Yorkshire, near Low Dinsdale
- Dinsdale, New Zealand, a suburb of Hamilton

== People ==
- Dinsdale (surname)
- Dinsdale Landen, British actor

== Fictional characters ==
- One of the Piranha Brothers in a sketch from the British comedy programme Monty Python's Flying Circus
- A character in the British play The Ruling Class
