= Alex Bell (writer) =

English author (born 1986)

- Born: Alexandra Rebecca Bell; 24 April 1986 (age 40); Southampton, England
- Other name: Alexandra Bell
- Education: University of Southampton
- Years active: 2008–present

Alexandra Rebecca Bell (born 24 April 1986) is an English author of adult, young adult (YA), and middle-grade speculative fiction. She writes under the names Alex Bell and Alexandra Bell.

== Early life ==
Bell grew up in the New Forest District of Hampshire. She studied Law at the University of Southampton, graduating in 2007. She then began an LPC qualification, but dropped out due to a lack of interest, opting instead to work part-time at the Citizens Advice Bureau while she pursued writing professionally.

== Career ==
At age 19, Bell signed with agent Carolyn Whitaker. For her second attempt at novel-writing, Bell landed her first deal with Gollancz, through which she published her debut adult horror novel The Ninth Circle in April 2008. The Ninth Circle was nominated for the Locus Award for Best First Novel. Her second published novel Jasmyn followed in 2009, which was longlisted for a British Fantasy Award. She then moved to Headline for her first young adult (YA) Lex Trent duology.

In 2014, Stripes Publishing (a Little Tiger Group imprint) invited Bell to contribute a novel to its Red Eye horror series. Bell came up with Frozen Charlotte, a young adult (YA) thriller about antique dolls. Frozen Charlotte was a 2016 Zoella Book Club pick for WH Smith. After readers expressed interest in learning more about the backstory to Frozen Charlotte, Bell wrote an Edwardian Isle of Skye-set prequel titled Charlotte Says, which was published in 2017. The Haunting (2016) and The Lighthouse (2022) would also form part of the Red Eye series.

Then with Faber Children's in a three-book deal, Bell went in a more light-hearted direction with a middle-grade fantasy adventure series, starting with The Polar Bear Explorers' Club in 2017. The Polar Bear Explorers' Club was named Waterstones Book of the Month and longlisted for the Carnegie Medal. Rounding out the initial trilogy with The Forbidden Expedition (also known as Explorers on Witch Mountain) and Explorers on Black Ice Bridge, the series expanded to six novels.

In 2019, Bell published the standalone novels Music and Malice in Hurricane Town and A Most Peculiar Toy Factory via Barrington Stoke.

After completing The Polar Bear Explorers, Rock the Boat Books (a Oneworld Publications imprint) commissioned Bell to write a middle-grade horror trilogy, starting with The Train of Dark Wonders in October 2023. The second installment The Hunt for the Cursed Unicorn followed in 2024, with the third set to be published in 2025. In addition, she wrote The Glorious Race of Magical Beasts, published in 2024.

Bell also began writing under the name Alexandra Bell in 2021; The Winter Garden, an adult Victorian fantasy novel published via Del Rey (a Cornerstone UK imprint), marked Bell's debut title under the new moniker. The Winter Garden was compared to Robert Dinsdale's The Toymakers (2018) and Natasha Pulley's The Watchmaker of Filigree Street (2015). Her second title under the Alexandra Bell name was The White Octopus Hotel in 2025.

== Bibliography ==
=== Lex Trent ===
- Lex Trent Versus the Gods (2010)
- Fighting with Fire (2011)

=== Frozen Charlotte ===
- Frozen Charlotte (2014)
- Charlotte Says (2017) (prequel)

=== The Polar Bear Explorers' Club ===
- The Polar Bear Explorers' Club (2017)
- The Forbidden Expedition (2018) (also known as Explorers on Witch Mountain)
- Explorers on Black Ice Bridge (2019)
- The Ocean Squid Explorers' Club (2020)
- Explorers at Pirate Island (2021)
- Explorers at Stardust City (2022)

=== The Train of Dark Wonders ===
- The Train of Dark Wonders (2023)
- The Hunt for the Cursed Unicorn (2024)
- Escape from the Castle of Illusions (2025)

=== Standalones ===
- The Ninth Circle (2008)
- Jasmyn (2009)
- The Haunting (2016) (Red Eye)
- A Most Peculiar Toy Factory (2019)
- Music and Malice in Hurricane Town (2019)
- The Lighthouse (2022) (Red Eye)
- The Glorious Race of Magical Beasts (2025)

=== As Alexandra Bell ===
- The Winter Garden (2021)
- The White Octopus Hotel (2025)

=== Short stories ===
- "The Fifth Bedroom" in The Mammoth Book of Ghost Stories by Women (2012), edited by Marie O'Regan
- "The Devil in Red" in X7: A Seven Deadly Sins Anthology (2013), edited by Alex Davis
- "The Confession" in Tales from the Vatican Vault (2015), edited by David V. Barrett
