= 2011 New Forest District Council election =

2011 UK local government election

← 2007	5 May 2011	2015 →

All 60 seats to New Forest District Council 31 seats needed for a majority
	First party	Second party
Party	Conservative	Liberal Democrats
Seats before	46	14
Seats won	54	6
Seat change	▲8	▼8
Popular vote	36,502	16,757
- Results by Ward
Council control before election
Conservative
Council control after election
Conservative

The 2011 New Forest District Council election took place on 5 May 2011 to elect members to the New Forest District Council, on the same day as other local elections. The election saw the Conservatives gain eight seats from the Liberal Democrats, increasing their majority.

== Election Summary ==
After the 2007 elections, the Conservatives held 45 seats, the Liberal Democrats held 14, and one seat was Independent; Prior to this election, Independent Councillor Danny Cracknell died, with the Conservatives winning a subsequent by-election, meaning that the Conservatives held 46 seats and Liberal Democrats held 14.

The Conservatives again increased their control of the council, winning 54 seats out of 60, with the Liberal Democrats holding the remaining six.

Note that comparisons to the previous election do not include Bramshaw, Copythorne North and Minstead, as a by-election was held several months later instead.

The table below only tallies the votes of the highest polling candidate for each party within each ward. This is known as the top candidate method and is often used for multi-member plurality elections.

New Forest local election result 2011
Party	Seats	Gains	Losses	Net gain/loss	Seats %	Votes %	Votes	+/−
Conservative	54	8	0	▲8	90.00	56.09	36,502	▼0.39
Liberal Democrats	6	0	8	▼8	10.00	25.75	16,757	▼9.05
Labour	0	Steady	Steady	Steady	0.00	10.99	7,156	▲8.70
Green	0	Steady	Steady	Steady	0.00	3.87	2,520	▲1.39
UKIP	0	Steady	Steady	Steady	0.00	3.27	2,133	▲3.27

== Ward Results ==
=== Ashurst, Copythorne South and Netley Marsh ===
Ashurst, Copythorne South and Netley Marsh (2)
Party	Candidate	Votes	%	±%
Conservative	Leslie Puttock	1,431	63.51	▼6.09
Conservative	Derek Tipp	1,422		
Liberal Democrats	Stuart Ardern	466	20.68	▼0.86
Labour	Peter Sopowski	356	15.80	▲6.95
Liberal Democrats	Timothy Mawby	301		
Majority		965	42.83	▼5.23
Turnout		2,253		
Conservative hold		Swing		
Conservative hold		Swing		

=== Barton ===
Barton (2)
Party	Candidate	Votes	%	±%
Conservative	Godfrey Beck	1,715	64.01	▼12.80
Conservative	Alan O'Sullivan	1,666		
Liberal Democrats	Lisa Chatfield	560	20.90	▼2.28
Labour	Peter Beck	404	15.08	▲15.08
Majority		1,155	43.11	▼10.52
Turnout		2,679		
Conservative hold		Swing		
Conservative hold		Swing		

=== Bashley ===
Bashley
Party	Candidate	Votes	%	±%
Conservative	Alan Rice	849	71.64	▼6.24
Liberal Democrats	Roger Dagnall	170	14.34	▼7.77
Labour	Caroline Hexter	166	14.00	▲14.00
Majority		679	57.29	▲1.53
Turnout		1,185		
Conservative hold		Swing		

=== Becton ===
Becton (2)
Party	Candidate	Votes	%	±%
Conservative	Christine Ward	1,140	55.12	▼20.11
Conservative	Paul Woods	1,085		
Liberal Democrats	Judith Baker	370	17.89	▼6.87
UKIP	Ivan Ledger	342	16.53	▲16.53
Liberal Democrats	Brenda Vincent	220		
Labour	Joan Iles	216	10.44	▲10.44
Majority		770	37.23	▼13.23
Turnout		2,068		
Conservative hold		Swing		
Conservative hold		Swing		

=== Boldre and Sway ===
Boldre and Sway (2)
Party	Candidate	Votes	%	±%
Conservative	Barry Rickman	1,665	71.64	▼1.63
Conservative	Colin Wise	1,336		
Liberal Democrats	Susan Lewis	659	28.35	▲1.63
Liberal Democrats	Linda Hollins	418		
Majority		1,006	43.28	▼3.26
Turnout		2,324		
Conservative hold		Swing		
Conservative hold		Swing		

=== Bramshaw, Copythrone North and Minstead ===
Bramshaw, Copythorne North and Minstead
Party	Candidate	Votes	%	±%
Conservative	Diane Andrews	802	77.78	▼0.22
Liberal Democrats	Jane Woodnutt	229	22.21	▲0.22
Majority		573	55.57	▼0.43
Turnout		559	26.2	
Conservative hold		Swing		

=== Bransgore and Burley ===
Bransgore and Burley (2)
Party	Candidate	Votes	%	±%
Conservative	Ann Hickman	1,789	65.99	▲15.67
Conservative	John Penwarden	1,539		
Liberal Democrats	Richard Grant	536	19.77	▲3.57
Labour	Peter Kelleher	386	14.23	▲14.23
Majority		1,253	46.21	▲29.37
Turnout		2,653		
Conservative hold		Swing		
Conservative hold		Swing		

=== Brockenhurst and Forest South East ===
Brockenhurst and Forest South East (2)
Party	Candidate	Votes	%	±%
Conservative	Maureen Holding	1,693	72.13	▲3.47
Conservative	Frank Vickers	1,471		
Liberal Democrats	Allan Hendry	654	27.86	▼7.67
Liberal Democrats	Rachel Smith	638		
Majority		1,039	44.26	▼4.20
Turnout		2,347		
Conservative hold		Swing		
Conservative hold		Swing		

=== Buckland ===
Buckland
Party	Candidate	Votes	%	±%
Conservative	Anthony Swain	624	60.28	▲5.97
Liberal Democrats	Edward Jearrad	283	27.34	▼18.34
Labour	Stephen Short	128	12.36	▲12.36
Majority		679	32.94	▲24.32
Turnout		1,035		
Conservative hold		Swing		

=== Butts Ash and Dibden Purlieu ===
Butts Ash and Dibden Purlieu (2)
Party	Candidate	Votes	%	±%
Liberal Democrats	Malcolm Wade	1,055	43.88	▼8.75
Conservative	James Binns	1,020	42.42	▼4.94
Liberal Democrats	Rebecca Clark	972		
Conservative	Brian Uglow	963		
Labour	Iris Smith	329	▲13.68	13.68
Turnout		2,404		
Liberal Democrats hold		Swing		
Conservative gain from Liberal Democrats		Swing		

=== Dibden and Hythe East ===
Dibden and Hythe East (2)
Party	Candidate	Votes	%	±%
Liberal Democrats	Christopher Harrison	1,001	55.54	▲6.34
Liberal Democrats	Stanley Wade	963		
Conservative	Beverley Thorne	801	44.45	▲0.85
Conservative	Teresa Joof	768		
Majority		200	11.09	▲5.49
Turnout		1,802		
Liberal Democrats hold		Swing		
Liberal Democrats hold		Swing		

=== Downlands and Forest ===
Downlands and Forest
Party	Candidate	Votes	%	±%
Conservative	Edward Heron	901	67.13	▲9.51
Green	Janet Richards	270	20.11	▼0.95
Liberal Democrats	Paul Toynton	171	12.74	▼8.56
Majority		631	47.01	▲10.7
Turnout		1,342		
Conservative hold		Swing		

=== Fawley, Blackfield and Langley ===
Fawley, Blackfield and Langley
Party	Candidate	Votes	%	±%
Conservative	Alexis McEvoy	1,418	67.87	▲10.15
Conservative	Robert Wappet	1,215		
Liberal Democrats	Brenda Smith	671	32.12	▼10.15
Liberal Democrats	Alexander Wade	591		
Majority		203	9.71	▼5.74
Turnout		2,089		
Conservative hold		Swing		
Conservative hold		Swing		

=== Fernhill ===
Fernhill (2)
Party	Candidate	Votes	%	±%
Conservative	Jill Cleary	1,321	59.211	▼4.06
Conservative	John Ward	1,076		
Liberal Democrats	Beverley Scott-Johns	509	22.81	▼5.31
Labour	Amy Coakes	401	17.97	▲9.37
Majority		812	36.39	▲1.24
Turnout		2,231		
Conservative hold		Swing		
Conservative hold		Swing		

=== Fordingbridge ===
Fordingbridge (2)
Party	Candidate	Votes	%	±%
Conservative	Roxanne Bellows	1,124	41.94	▲5.54
Conservative	Ann Sevier	1,105		
Liberal Democrats	Miranda Whitehead	896	33.43	▼14.78
Liberal Democrats	Timothy Denne	688		
Green	Christopher Dennis	365	13.61	▲2.7
Labour	Brian Shemmings	344	11.00	▲6.54
Majority		228	8.50	
Turnout		2,680		
Conservative gain from Liberal Democrats		Swing		
Conservative gain from Liberal Democrats		Swing		

=== Forest North West ===
Forest North West
Party	Candidate	Votes	%	±%
Conservative	Bill Dow	Unopposed		
Conservative hold		Swing		

=== Furzedown and Hardley ===
Furzedown and Hardley
Party	Candidate	Votes	%	±%
Conservative	Michael Ross	444	45.72	▲5.87
Liberal Democrats	Graham Parkes	309	31.82	▼28.32
Green	Elaine Fordham	218	22.45	▲22.45
Majority		135	13.90	
Turnout		971		
Conservative gain from Liberal Democrats		Swing		

=== Holbury and North Blackfield ===
Holbury and North Blackfield (2)
Party	Candidate	Votes	%	±%
Conservative	Allan Glass	830	51.29	▲19.16
Conservative	Alan Alvery	759		
Labour	Karlton Smith	407	25.15	▲15.74
Liberal Democrats	David Lord	381	23.54	▼34.91
Labour	Michael Perkins	365		
Liberal Democrats	David Townsley	344		
Majority		71	4.38	
Turnout		1,618		
Conservative gain from Liberal Democrats		Swing		
Conservative gain from Liberal Democrats		Swing		

=== Hordle ===
Hordle (2)
Party	Candidate	Votes	%	±%
Conservative	Andrew Tinsley	1,239	47.78	▼22.37
Conservative	Penelope Lovelace	1,214		
UKIP	Ian Linney	652	25.14	▲25.14
Liberal Democrats	Jacqueline Szwaczka	406	15.65	▼14.19
Labour	Peter Coakes	296	11.41	▲11.41
Majority		587	22.63	▼17.67
Turnout		2,593		
Conservative hold		Swing		
Conservative hold		Swing		

=== Hythe West and Langdown ===
Hythe West and Langdown (2)
Party	Candidate	Votes	%	±%
Liberal Democrats	Maureen McLean	1,609	56.47	▼8.04
Liberal Democrats	Maureen Robinson	1,128		
Conservative	Joan Fowler	892	31.30	▼4.18
Conservative	Brenda Spearing	876		
Labour	Emmanuel Boateng	348	12.21	▲12.21
Majority		717	25.16	▼3.86
Turnout		2,849		
Liberal Democrats hold		Swing		
Liberal Democrats hold		Swing		

=== Lymington Town ===
Lymington Town (2)
Party	Candidate	Votes	%	±%
Conservative	Anna Rostand	1,479	56.47	▼13.4
Conservative	Miriam Lewis	1,473		
Liberal Democrats	Freda Angelou	481	18.36	▼0.99
Liberal Democrats	Stephen Moss	419		
UKIP	Michael Beggs	383	14.62	▲14.62
Labour	Robert Joy	276	10.53	▲10.53
Majority		998	38.10	▼12.41
Turnout		2,619		
Conservative hold		Swing		
Conservative hold		Swing		

=== Lyndhurst ===
Lyndhurst
Party	Candidate	Votes	%	±%
Conservative	Patricia Wyeth	858	75.39	▲0.42
Liberal Democrats	Michael Reid	153	13.44	▼2.47
Labour	Kenneth Kershaw	127	11.15	▲2.05
Majority		705	61.95	▲2.89
Turnout		1,138		
Conservative hold		Swing		

=== Marchwood ===
Marchwood (2)
Party	Candidate	Votes	%	±%
Conservative	Alison Hoare	1,020	51.75	▼0.53
Conservative	Susan Bennison	742		
Liberal Democrats	Keith Petty	455	23.08	▼13.19
Liberal Democrats	Geraint Rowlands	338		
Green	Beverley Golden	268	13.59	▲2.15
Labour	Sean Hill	228	11.56	▲11.56
Majority		565	28.66	▲
Turnout		1,971		
Conservative hold		Swing		
Conservative hold		Swing		

=== Milford ===
Milford (2)
Party	Candidate	Votes	%	±%
Conservative	Melville Kendal	1,802	78.55	▼0.52
Conservative	Michael Pemberton	1,678		
Labour	Tracey Carruthers	492	21.44	▲21.44
Majority		1,310	57.10	▼1.05
Turnout		2,294		
Conservative hold		Swing		
Conservative hold		Swing		

=== Milton ===
Milton (2)
Party	Candidate	Votes	%	±%
Conservative	Stephen Clarke	1,144	51.20	▼7.02
Conservative	Stephen Davies	1,138		
UKIP	Nigel Cox	439	19.65	▲19.65
Liberal Democrats	Wynford Davies	344	15.39	▼20.07
Liberal Democrats	Paul Chatfield	341		
Labour	Peter Dance	307	13.74	▲7.09
Majority		705	31.55	▲9.14
Turnout		2,234		
Conservative hold		Swing		
Conservative hold		Swing		

=== Pennington ===
Pennington (2)
Party	Candidate	Votes	%	±%
Conservative	Penelope Jackman	922	45.58	▼1.89
Conservative	Alexander Kilgour	877		
Liberal Democrats	Paul Hickman	655	30.10	▼16.41
Liberal Democrats	Martina Humber	569		
Labour	Lena Samuels	265	12.17	▲6.17
Green	Sally May	264	12.13	▲12.13
Majority		337	15.48	▼6.93
Turnout		2,176		
Conservative gain from Liberal Democrats		Swing		
Conservative hold		Swing		

=== Ringwood East and Sopley ===
Ringwood East and Sopley
Party	Candidate	Votes	%	±%
Conservative	Barbara Woodifield	756	70.52	▼5.22
Liberal Democrats	Cara Frost-Jones	180	16.79	▼7.46
Labour	Audrey Walker	136	12.68	▲12.68
Majority		576	53.73	▲2.25
Turnout		1,072		
Conservative hold		Swing		

=== Ringwood North ===
Ringwood North (2)
Party	Candidate	Votes	%	±%
Conservative	Lorna Ford	1,329	55.14	▲4.53
Conservative	Michael Thierry	1,174		
Labour	Peter Harper	450	18.67	▲8.93
Green	Timothy Rowe	392	16.26	▲6.74
Liberal Democrats	Brian Dash	239	9.91	▼20.21
Liberal Democrats	William Catt	190		
Majority		879	36.47	▲15.99
Turnout		2,410		
Conservative hold		Swing		
Conservative hold		Swing		

=== Ringwood South ===
Ringwood South (2)
Party	Candidate	Votes	%	±%
Conservative	William Rippon-Swaine	1,069	49.60	▲18.03
Conservative	Jeremy Heron	980		
Green	Sally Rose	627	29.09	▲29.09
Labour	Desmond Williams	459	21.29	▲12.45
Majority		442	20.51	
Turnout		2,155		
Conservative hold		Swing		
Conservative hold		Swing		

=== Totton Central ===
Totton Central (2)
Party	Candidate	Votes	%	±%
Conservative	Brian Lucas	947	59.59	▲7.54
Conservative	Ronald Scrivens	915		
Liberal Democrats	Stephen Starr	642	40.40	▼7.54
Liberal Democrats	Lotte Bakoji-Hume	583		
Majority		305	19.19	▲15.08
Turnout		1,589		
Conservative hold		Swing		
Conservative hold		Swing		

=== Totton East ===
Totton East (2)
Party	Candidate	Votes	%	±%
Conservative	Dean Britton	879	41.42	▼6.72
Conservative	Christopher Lagdon	783		
Liberal Democrats	Nicholas Dawson	631	29.73	▼12.98
Liberal Democrats	Jonathan Sawyer	574		
UKIP	David Robert Menhennet	317	14.93	▲14.93
Labour	Jennifer Ovenden	295	13.90	▲13.90
Majority		248	11.68	▲6.28
Turnout		2,122		
Conservative hold		Swing		
Conservative hold		Swing		

=== Totton North ===
Totton North
Party	Candidate	Votes	%	±%
Conservative	George Dart	903	54.99	▼0.17
Conservative	Neville Penman	902		
Liberal Democrats	Jacqueline Shaw	739	45.00	▲0.17
Liberal Democrats	Lorella Weeks	668		
Majority		164	9.98	▼0.35
Turnout		1642		
Conservative hold		Swing		
Conservative hold		Swing		

=== Totton South ===
Totton South (2)
Party	Candidate	Votes	%	±%
Liberal Democrats	David Harrison	917	45.19	▼14.83
Conservative	Michael Southgate	778	38.34	▼1.63
Conservative	Melvyn Molyneux	734		
Liberal Democrats	Alan Weeks	703		
Green	Helen Field	334	16.46	▲16.46
Turnout		2,029		
Liberal Democrats hold		Swing		
Conservative gain from Liberal Democrats		Swing		

=== Totton West ===
Totton West (2)
Party	Candidate	Votes	%	±%
Conservative	Diana Brooks	848	60.35	▲6.82
Conservative	David Russell	773		
Liberal Democrats	Leonard Harris	557	39.64	▼6.82
Liberal Democrats	Kate Lord	521		
Majority		291	20.71	▲13.64
Turnout		1,405		
Conservative hold		Swing		
Conservative hold		Swing		
