= 2015 New Forest District Council election =

2015 UK local government election

← 2011	7 May 2015	2019 →

All 60 seats to New Forest District Council 31 seats needed for a majority
	First party	Second party
Party	Conservative	Liberal Democrats
Seats before	54	6
Seats won	58	2
Seat change	▲4	▼4
Popular vote	48.989	14.941
- Results by Ward
Council control before election
Conservative
Council control after election
Conservative

The 2015 New Forest District Council election took place on 7 May 2015 to elect members of New Forest District Council in England. This was on the same day as other local elections.

The whole Council is re-elected every 4 years

After the election, the composition of the council was:

- Conservative - 58
- Liberal Democrat - 2

== Election summary ==
New Forest local election result 2015
Party	Seats	Gains	Losses	Net gain/loss	Seats %	Votes %	Votes	+/−
Conservative	58	4	0	▲4	96.66	50.56	48,969	▼5.53
UKIP	0	Steady	Steady	Steady	0.00	15.42	14,941	▲12.15
Labour	0	Steady	Steady	Steady	0.00	14.24	13,797	▲5.54
Liberal Democrats	2	Steady	4	▼4	3.33	11.19	10,847	▼14.56
Green	0	Steady	Steady	Steady	0.00	6.51	6,314	▲2.64
Independent	0	Steady	Steady	Steady	0.00	1.70	1,647	▲1.70
TUSC	0	Steady	Steady	Steady	0.00	0.30	334	▲0.30

== Ward results ==
=== Ashurst, Copythrone South & Netley Marsh ===
Ashurst, Copythorne South and Netley Marsh (2)
Party	Candidate	Votes	%	±%
Conservative	Leslie Puttock	1,922	58.14	▼5.37
Conservative	Derek Tipp	1,689		
UKIP	Peter Day	840	24.51	▲24.51
Labour	Kenneth Kershaw	594	17.33	▲1.53
Labour	Peter Sopowski	506		
Majority		1,082	31.58	▼11.25
Turnout		3,426	73.40	
Conservative hold		Swing		
Conservative hold		Swing		

=== Barton ===
Barton (2)
Party	Candidate	Votes	%	±%
Conservative	Godfrey Beck	1,959	55.92	▼8.09
Conservative	Alan O'Sullivan	1,946		
UKIP	Ann Vasilesco	986	28.14	▲28.14
Labour	Peter Terry	558	15.92	▲0.84
Majority		973	27.77	▼15.34
Turnout		3,503	71.6	
Conservative hold		Swing		
Conservative hold		Swing		

=== Bashley ===
Bashley
Party	Candidate	Votes	%	±%
Conservative	Donald Tungate	1,070	67.16	▼4.48
UKIP	Gwen Bailey	323	20.27	▲20.27
Labour	Martin Phillips	200	12.55	▼1.45
Majority		747	46.89	▼10.4
Turnout		1,593	71.8	
Conservative hold		Swing		

=== Becton ===
Becton (2)
Party	Candidate	Votes	%	±%
Conservative	Christine Ward	1,350	50.52	▼4.6
Conservative	Geoffrey Blunden	1,290		
UKIP	Paul Bailey	761	28.48	▲11.95
Liberal Democrats	Wynford Davies	561	20.99	▲3.10
Majority		589	22.04	▼15.19
Turnout		2,672	65.9	
Conservative hold		Swing		
Conservative hold		Swing		

=== Boldre & Sway ===
Boldre and Sway (2)
Party	Candidate	Votes	%	±%
Conservative	Barry Rickman	2,352	70.73	▼0.91
Conservative	Colin Wise	1,629		
Green	Thomas Greenwood	973	29.26	▲29.26
Majority		1,379	41.47	▼1.81
Turnout		3,325	72.60	
Conservative hold		Swing		
Conservative hold		Swing		

=== Bramshaw, Copythorne North and Minstead ===
Bramshaw, Copythorne North and Minstead
Party	Candidate	Votes	%	±%
Conservative	Diane Andrews	1,222	77.29	▼0.49
Green	Anthony Gray	359	22.70	▲22.70
Majority		863	54.58	▼0.99
Turnout		1,581		
Conservative hold		Swing		

=== Bransgore & Burley ===
Bransgore and Burley (2)
Party	Candidate	Votes	%	±%
Conservative	Richard Frampton	2,386	66.46	▲0.47
Conservative	Mark Steele	1,805		
Green	Colin Thurston	740	20.61	▲20.61
Labour	Brian Curwain	464	12.92	▼1.31
Majority		1,646	45.84	▼0.37
Turnout		3,590		
Conservative hold		Swing		
Conservative hold		Swing		

=== Brockenhurst & Forest South East ===
Brockenhurst and Forest South East (2)
Party	Candidate	Votes	%	±%
Conservative	Michael Harris	1,964	49.78	▼22.35
Conservative	Maureen Holding	1,934		
Green	Henry Mellor	801	20.30	▲20.30
UKIP	Rachel John Beaumont	682	17.28	▲17.28
Labour	Bramley Murton	498	12.62	▲12.62
Majority		1,163	29.48	▼14.78
Turnout		3,945		
Conservative hold		Swing		
Conservative hold		Swing		

=== Buckland ===
Buckland
Party	Candidate	Votes	%	±%
Conservative	John Olliff-Cooper	812	51.03	▼9.25
Independent	Edward Jearrad	304	19.10	▲19.10
Labour	Bernard Tennant	244	15.33	▲2.97
Liberal Democrats	Brenda Vincent	231	14.51	▼18.34
Majority		508	31.92	▼1.02
Turnout		1,591		
Conservative hold		Swing		

=== Butts Ash & Dibden Purlieu ===
Butts Ash and Dibden Purlieu (2)
Party	Candidate	Votes	%	±%
Conservative	James Binns	1,426	40.85	▼3.03
Conservative	Peter Armstrong	1,398		
Liberal Democrats	Malcom Wade	1,175	33.66	▼10.22
Liberal Democrats	Lorraine Monaghan	945		
UKIP	Peter Rogers	515	14.75	▲14.75
UKIP	Christopher Tribe	412		
Labour	David Dale	374	10.71	▼2.97
Majority		251	7.19	▲
Turnout		3,490		
Conservative hold		Swing		
Conservative gain from Liberal Democrats		Swing		

=== Dibden & Hythe East ===
Dibden and Hythe East (2)
Party	Candidate	Votes	%	±%
Conservative	Daniel Poole	1,274	38.01	▼6.44
Conservative	William Andrews	1,151		
Liberal Democrats	Christopher Harrison	1,058	31.57	▼23.97
Liberal Democrats	Stanley Wade	942		
UKIP	Philip Wilson	658	19.63	▲19.63
Green	Edward Caplen	361	10.77	▲10.77
Majority		216	6.44	
Turnout		3,351		
Conservative gain from Liberal Democrats		Swing		
Conservative gain from Liberal Democrats		Swing		

=== Downlands and Forest ===
Downlands and Forest
Party	Candidate	Votes	%	±%
Conservative	Edward Heron	1,436	78.46	▲11.33
Labour	Paul Toynton	394	21.53	▲21.53
Majority		1,042	56.93	▼10.2
Turnout		1,830		
Conservative hold		Swing		

=== Fawley, Blackfield & Langley ===
Fawley, Blackfield and Langley (2)
Party	Candidate	Votes	%	±%
Conservative	Alexis McEvoy	1,551	42.60	▼25.27
Conservative	Robert Wappet	1,402		
UKIP	Gillian Gulliver	1,118	30.71	▲30.71
Liberal Democrats	Ronan West	519	14.25	▼17.87
Labour	Paul Williams	452	12.41	▲12.41
Liberal Democrats	Linda McDermott	334		
Majority		433	11.89	▲2.18
Turnout		3,640		
Conservative hold		Swing		
Conservative hold		Swing		

=== Fernhill ===
Fernhill (2)
Party	Candidate	Votes	%	±%
Conservative	Jill Cleary	1,533	49.45	▼9.76
Conservative	John Ward	1,384		
UKIP	Marlene Wilkins	933	30.09	▲30.09
Labour	Stephen Short	634	20.45	▲2.48
Majority		149	4.80	▼31.59
Turnout		3,100		
Conservative hold		Swing		
Conservative hold		Swing		

=== Fordingbridge ===
Fordingbridge (2)
Party	Candidate	Votes	%	±%
Conservative	Roxanne Bellows	1,997	53.21	▲11.27
Conservative	Ann Sevier	1,917		
Labour	David Cakebread	826	22.00	▲11.00
Liberal Democrats	Sidney Rasey	636	16.94	▲16.94
UKIP	Wendy Rasey	541		
TUSC	Helen Ward	294	7.83	▲7.83
Majority		1,171	31.20	▲22.7
Turnout		3,753		
Conservative hold		Swing		
Conservative hold		Swing		

=== Forest North West ===
Forest North West
Party	Candidate	Votes	%	±%
Conservative	Bill Dow	Unopposed		
Conservative hold		Swing		

=== Furzedown & Hardley ===
Furzedown and Hardley
Party	Candidate	Votes	%	±%
Conservative	Kathleen Crisell	617	37.05	▼8.67
Liberal Democrats	Mark Clark	569	34.17	▲2.35
UKIP	Paul Thomas	479	28.76	▲28.76
Majority		48	2.88	▼11.02
Turnout		1,665		
Conservative hold		Swing		

=== Holbury & North Blackfield ===
Holbury and North Blackfield (2)
Party	Candidate	Votes	%	±%
Conservative	Allan Glass	1,204	37.88	▼13.41
Conservative	Alan Alvery	1,152		
UKIP	Philip Pearce-Smith	856	26.93	▲26.93
Labour	Tina Williams	577	18.15	▼7.00
Liberal Democrats	Sally-Jane Read	541	17.02	▼6.52
Liberal Democrats	Brenda Smith	315		
Majority		348	10.95	▼6.57
Turnout		3,178		
Conservative hold		Swing		
Conservative hold		Swing		

=== Hordle ===
Hordle (2)
Party	Candidate	Votes	%	±%
Conservative	Penelope Lovelace	1,810	52.43	▲4.65
Conservative	Frances Carpenter	1,543		
UKIP	Ian Linney	1,080	31.28	▼6.14
Liberal Democrats	Jacqueline Szwaczka	562	16.28	▲0.63
Majority		587	21.14	▼1.49
Turnout		3,452		
Conservative hold		Swing		
Conservative hold		Swing		

=== Hythe West and Langdown ===
Hythe West and Langdown (2)
Party	Candidate	Votes	%	±%
Conservative	Beverley Thorne	1,459	44.07	▲12.77
Liberal Democrats	Alexander Wade	1,348	40.72	▼15.75
Liberal Democrats	Rebecca Clark	1,225		
Conservative	Thomas Webb	1,184		
Labour	Patricia Gillam	503	15.19	▲12.21
Turnout		3,310		
Conservative gain from Liberal Democrats		Swing		
Liberal Democrats hold		Swing		

=== Lymington Town ===
Lymington Town (2)
Party	Candidate	Votes	%	±%
Conservative	Anna Rostand	1,785	49.58	▼6.89
Conservative	Alan Penson	1,439		
Independent	Jacqueline England	1,343	37.30	▲37.30
Independent	Michael Woodford	934		
Labour	Gary le Port	472	13.11	▲2.58
Majority		442	12.27	▼25.83
Turnout		3,600		
Conservative hold		Swing		
Conservative hold		Swing		

=== Lyndhurst ===
Lyndhurst
Party	Candidate	Votes	%	±%
Conservative	Patricia Wyeth	1,079	60.68	▼14.71
Green	Gerard Burden	373	20.97	▲20.97
UKIP	Philip Fawkes	326	18.33	▲18.33
Majority		706	39.70	▼22.25
Turnout		1,778		
Conservative hold		Swing		

=== Marchwood ===
Marchwood (2)
Party	Candidate	Votes	%	±%
Conservative	Alison Hoare	1,488	50.78	▼0.97
Conservative	Susan Bennison	1,232		
Liberal Democrats	Linda Bovey	771	26.31	▲3.23
UKIP	William Evans	673	22.96	▲22.96
Liberal Democrats	Martin Bovey	628		
UKIP	John Swales	491		
Majority		717	24.47	▼4.19
Turnout		2,930		
Conservative hold		Swing		
Conservative hold		Swing		

=== Milford ===
Milford (2)
Party	Candidate	Votes	%	±%
Conservative	Sophie Beton	2,282	79.67	▲1.12
Conservative	Melville Kendal	2,232		
Labour	Amy Coakes	582	20.32	▼1.12
Majority		1,700	59.35	▲2.25
Turnout		2,864		
Conservative hold		Swing		
Conservative hold		Swing		

=== Milton ===
Milton (2)
Party	Candidate	Votes	%	±%
Conservative	Stephen Clarke	1,727	53.76	▲2.56
Conservative	Stephen Clarke	1,635		
Liberal Democrats	Judith Baker	770	23.97	▲8.58
Labour	Caroline Hexter	715	22.26	▲8.52
Majority		957	29.79	▼1.76
Turnout		3,102		
Conservative hold		Swing		
Conservative hold		Swing		

=== Pennington ===
Pennington (2)
Party	Candidate	Votes	%	±%
Conservative	Michael White	1,505	52.09	▲6.51
Conservative	Penelope Jackman	1,413		
Liberal Democrats	Jack Davies	832	28.79	▼1.31
Liberal Democrats	Nicholas McGeorge	586		
Labour	Margaret Humphreys	552	19.10	▲6.93
Majority		673	23.29	▲7.81
Turnout		2,889		
Conservative hold		Swing		
Conservative hold		Swing		

=== Ringwood East & Sopley ===
Ringwood East & Sopley
Party	Candidate	Votes	%	±%
Conservative	Emma Lane	Unopposed		
Conservative hold		Swing		

=== Ringwood North ===
Ringwood North (2)
Party	Candidate	Votes	%	±%
Conservative	Lorna Ford	1,801	37.25	▼17.89
Conservative	Michael Thierry	1,706		
Labour	Peter Kelleher	1,445	29.89	▲11.22
UKIP	Rosalind Mills	868	17.95	▲17.95
Green	Timothy Rowe	720	14.89	▼1.37
Majority		356	7.36	▼29.11
Turnout		4,834		
Conservative hold		Swing		
Conservative hold		Swing		

=== Ringwood South ===
Ringwood South (2)
Party	Candidate	Votes	%	±%
Conservative	William Rippon-Swaine	1,680	48.56	▼1.04
Conservative	Jeremy Heron	1,639		
Green	Julian Konczak	988	28.56	▼0.53
Labour	Desmond Williams	791	22.86	▲1.57
Majority		692	20.00	▼0.51
Turnout		3,459		
Conservative hold		Swing		
Conservative hold		Swing		

=== Totton Central ===
Totton Central (2)
Party	Candidate	Votes	%	±%
Conservative	Louise Cerasoli	1,461	46.46	▼13.13
Conservative	Brian Lucas	1,126		
Labour	Alan Goodfellow	621	19.75	▲19.75
UKIP	Frances Orchard	598	19.02	▼19.02
UKIP	Ronald Scrivens	581		
Green	Callum O'Driscoll	464	14.75	▲14.75
Majority		840	26.71	▲7.52
Turnout		3,144		
Conservative hold		Swing		
Conservative hold		Swing		

=== Totton East ===
Totton East (2)
Party	Candidate	Votes	%	±%
Conservative	Ian Coombes	1,155	35.88	▼5.54
Conservative	Arthur Davis	1,018		
UKIP	William Rogers	720	22.36	▲7.43
UKIP	Robert Menhennet	691		
Liberal Democrats	Alexander Brunsdon	632	19.63	▼10.10
Liberal Democrats	Jacqueline Shaw	533		
Labour	David Moran	399	12.39	▼1.51
Green	Helen Field	273	8.48	▲8.48
Green	Joanna Tidbury	229		
TUSC	Jean Walker	40	1.24	▲1.24
Majority		435	13.51	▼1.83
Turnout		3,219		
Conservative hold		Swing		
Conservative hold		Swing		

=== Totton North ===
Totton North
Party	Candidate	Votes	%	±%
Conservative	Dean Britton	1,291	44.65	▼10.34
Conservative	Neville Penman	1,099		
UKIP	Ian Molyneux	638	22.06	▲22.06
UKIP	Melvyn Molyneux	590		
Liberal Democrats	Julie Martin	492	17.01	▼27.99
Labour	Martin Grist	470	16.25	▲16.25
Liberal Democrats	Diane Pratt	440		
Majority		653	22.58	▲12.60
Turnout		2,891		
Conservative hold		Swing		
Conservative hold		Swing		

=== Totton South ===
Totton South (2)
Party	Candidate	Votes	%	±%
Liberal Democrats	David Harrison	1,348	39.31	▼5.88
Conservative	Leonard Harris	979	28.55	▼9.79
Conservative	Michael Southgate	829		
Liberal Democrats	Caroline Rackham	603		
UKIP	Graham Barrett	536	15.63	▲15.63
UKIP	Donna-Marie Legg	485		
Labour	Elizabeth Chell	304	8.86	▲8.86
Green	Alan Weeks	262	7.64	▼8.82
Green	Lorella Weeks	178		
Turnout		3,429		
Liberal Democrats hold		Swing		
Conservative hold		Swing		

=== Totton West ===
Totton West (2)
Party	Candidate	Votes	%	±%
Conservative	Diana Brooks	1,322	50.78	▼9.57
Conservative	David Russell	1,031		
UKIP	Christopher Lagdon	715	27.46	▲27.46
Labour	Peter Dance	566	21.74	▲21.74
Majority		607	23.31	▼2.60
Turnout		2,603		
Conservative hold		Swing		
Conservative hold		Swing		
