= Hannah Phillips =

British YouTuber and politician

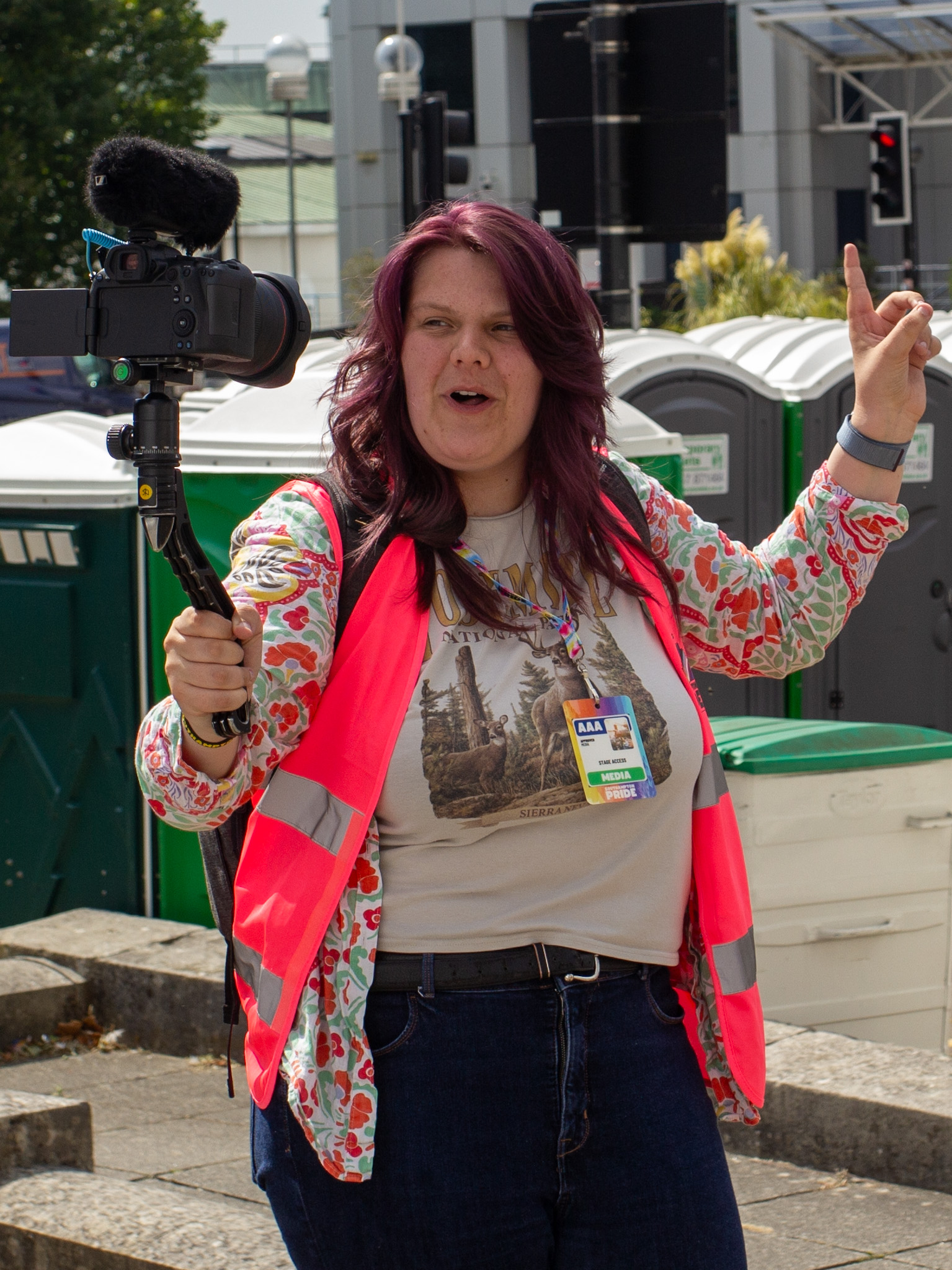
- Phillips in 2025

Lymington and Pennington Town Councillor
- Incumbent
- Assumed office 15 May 2023

Personal details
- Born: 11 December 1999 (age 26)
- Party: Liberal Democrats
- Website: hannahphillipsreal.com

YouTube information
- Channel: Hannah Phillips
- Years active: 2015-present
- Subscribers: 15.6 thousand
- Views: 2.3 million
- Last updated: 12 April 2026

Hannah Phillips (born 11 December 1999) is a British YouTuber, activist and politician who has been a councillor for Lymington and Pennington Town Council since 2023.

== Early life ==
Hannah grew up in Brockenhurst and attended Brockenhurst College.

Phillips has been the target of significant harassment. In 2019, PinkNews wrote an article about comments she receives, highlighting regular death threats.

== Election ==
Phillips was elected as a councillor on Lymington and Pennington Town Council for the Ward of Buckland in 2023 beating the incumbent Conservative Party Candidate James Alexander Hoare by a majority of 57 votes.

During the 2023 New Forest District Council election, Phillips contested a seat on Lymington District Council receiving 586 votes, resulting in a defeat.

In the 2026 Hampshire County Council election, Phillips contested a seat for the Brockenhurst Division of Hampshire County Council receiving 694 votes, resulting in a defeat. Additionally in 2026, Phillips contested a seat for Bransgore, Burley, Sopley & Ringwood East Ward of New Forest District Council receiving 126 votes resulting in a defeat.

== Career ==
In a 2019 investigative report by the BBC regarding care for transgender youth, Phillips reported that she felt no regret in her medical transition - and that ultimately, nothing would have been able to stop it from happening. In July 2019, Phillips appeared on the BBC’s Newsnight programme to discuss her experiences as a patient at the Tavistock Gender Identity Development Service.

In 2020, she founded New Forest Pride, a non-profit organization responsible for organising the event of the same name.

She returned to Newsnight in April 2024 to comment on the Cass Review, a report evaluating gender identity services for children and young people in England.

== Media appearances ==
In 2022, Phillips appeared as a contestant in two episodes of the second series of the BBC One daytime quiz show The Tournament.

In 2025, she later discussed her filmmaking work and upcoming projects in a radio interview on Southampton-based station Voice FM.
