= Dinsdale (surname) =

Dinsdale is a surname. It originates from two villages in County Durham in England: Lower and Upper Dinsdale. It means Danes (Vikings) Dale (Valley) but specifically relates to the two villages. Notable people with the surname include:

- Dick Dinsdale, British newspaper editor
- George Dinsdale, British-born Canadian politician
- Bruce George Peter Lee (born as Peter George Dinsdale; 1960), prolific British serial killer, arsonist, and mass murderer
- Reece Dinsdale, British actor
- Robert Dinsdale, English novelist
- Shirley Dinsdale, American ventriloquist
- Sid Dinsdale, American banker
- Tim Dinsdale, filmed footage supposedly of the Loch Ness Monster
- Walter Dinsdale, Canadian politician
