= 2007 New Forest District Council election =

2007 UK local government election

← 2003	3 May 2007	2011 →

59 of 60 seats to New Forest District Council 31 seats needed for a majority
	First party	Second party	Third party
Party	Conservative	Liberal Democrats	Independent
Seats before	31	28	1
Seats won	44	14	1
Seat change	▲13 (Note: 14 including by-election)	▼14	Steady
Popular vote	30,655	18,890	1,738
- Results by Ward. White ward is Bramshaw, Copythorne North and Minstead, which held a by-election in June 2007 instead.
Council control before election
Conservative
Council control after election
Conservative

The 2007 New Forest District Council election took place on 3 May 2007 to elect members to the New Forest District Council, on the same day as other local elections. The election for Bramshaw, Copythorne North and Minstead was postponed due to the death of a candidate, and therefore a by-election was held on 14 June.

== Election Summary ==
The Conservatives won 13 seats new seats (14 including the Bramshaw, Copythorne North and Minstead by-election), increasing their majority, with the Liberal Democrats losing half (14) their seats, and the independent councillor Daniel Cracknell retaining his seat. Whilst not gaining representation, the Green and Labour parties increased their vote share.

New Forest local election result 2007
Party	Seats	Gains	Losses	Net gain/loss	Seats %	Votes %	Votes	+/−
Conservative	44	13	0	▲13	74.57	56.48	30,655	▲4.99
Liberal Democrats	14	0	13	▼14	23.72	34.80	18,890	▼5.68
Independent	1	0	0	Steady	1.69	3.20	1,738	▼4.20
Green	0	0	0	Steady	0.00	2.48	1,347	▲2.22
Labour	0	0	0	Steady	0.00	2.29	1,245	▲0.68
BNP	0	0	0	Steady	0.00	0.72	393	▲0.72

== Ward Results ==
=== Ashurst, Copythorne South and Netley Marsh ===
Ashurst, Copythorne South and Netley Marsh (2)
Party	Candidate	Votes	%	±%
Conservative	Les Puttock	1,202	69.60	▲23.96
Conservative	Derek Tipp	1,191		
Liberal Democrats	Stuart Ardern	372	21.54	▼1.64
Liberal Democrats	Tony Gray	353		
Labour	Peter Sopowski	153	8.85	▼7.11
Labour	Gary Barnett	119		
Majority		830	48.06	▲25.6
Turnout		1,727		
Conservative hold		Swing		
Conservative hold		Swing		

=== Barton ===
Barton (2)
Party	Candidate	Votes	%	±%
Conservative	Goff Bek	1,574	76.81	▲3.2
Conservative	John Hutchins	1,458		
Liberal Democrats	Lisa Chatfield	475	23.18	▼3.2
Liberal Democrats	Paul Chatfield	400		
Majority		1,099	53.63	▲6.41
Turnout		2,049		
Conservative hold		Swing		
Conservative hold		Swing		

=== Bashley ===
Bashley
Party	Candidate	Votes	%	±%
Conservative	Alan Rice	750	77.88	▼1.44
Liberal Democrats	Roger Dagnall	213	22.11	▲8.71
Majority		537	55.76	▼10.16
Turnout		963		
Conservative hold		Swing		

=== Becton ===
Becton (2)
Party	Candidate	Votes	%	±%
Conservative	Fran Carpenter	1,282	75.23	▲2.92
Conservative	Paul Woods	1,238		
Liberal Democrats	Judith Baker	422	24.76	▼2.92
Liberal Democrats	John Burton	383		
Majority		860	50.46	▲5.84
Turnout		1,704		
Conservative hold		Swing		
Conservative hold		Swing		

=== Boldre and Sway ===
Boldre and Sway (2)
Party	Candidate	Votes	%	±%
Conservative	Barry Rickman	1,412	73.27	▲1.46
Conservative	Paul Woods	1,231		
Liberal Democrats	Susan Lewis	515	26.72	▲5.98
Liberal Democrats	Donald Green	410		
Majority		897	46.54	▲4.52
Turnout		1,927		
Conservative hold		Swing		
Conservative hold		Swing		

=== Bransgore and Burley ===
Bransgore and Burley (2)
Party	Candidate	Votes	%	±%
Conservative	John Penwarden	1,335	50.32	▲12.17
Conservative	Peter Greenfield	1,164		
Independent	Sally Owen	888	33.47	▼1.46
Liberal Democrats	Jacqueline Brown	430	16.20	▼10.71
Majority		447	16.84	▲13.63
Turnout		2,653		
Conservative hold		Swing		
Conservative hold		Swing		

=== Brockenhurst and Forest South East ===
Brockenhurst and Forest South East (2)
Party	Candidate	Votes	%	±%
Conservative	Maureen Holding	1,479	68.66	▼5.14
Conservative	Paul Vickers	1,302		
Liberal Democrats	Robin Harrison	435	20.19	▼6.00
Liberal Democrats	David Smith	414		
BNP	Ian Johnson	240	11.14	▲11.14
Majority		1,044	48.46	▲0.86
Turnout		2,154		
Conservative hold		Swing		
Conservative hold		Swing		

=== Buckland ===
Buckland
Party	Candidate	Votes	%	±%
Conservative	Tony Swain	510	54.31	▲18.51
Liberal Democrats	Brenda Vincent	429	45.68	▼2.77
Majority		81	8.62	
Turnout		939		
Conservative gain from Liberal Democrats		Swing		

=== Butts Ash and Dibden Purlieu ===
Butts Ash and Dibden Purlieu (2)
Party	Candidate	Votes	%	±%
Liberal Democrats	Brenda Smith	1,059	52.63	▼11.98
Liberal Democrats	Malcolm Wade	977		
Conservative	Graham Jones	953	47.36	▲11.98
Conservative	Chris Ancrum	899		
Majority		106	5.26	▼23.96
Turnout		2,012		
Liberal Democrats hold		Swing		
Liberal Democrats hold		Swing		

=== Dibden and Hythe East ===
Dibden and Hythe East (2)
Party	Candidate	Votes	%	±%
Liberal Democrats	Christopher Harrison	808	49.20	▼18.83
Liberal Democrats	Stan Wade	793		
Conservative	Eric Davey	716	43.60	▲11.64
Conservative	Robert Newell	685		
Green	John Pemberton	118	7.18	▲7.18
Majority		92	5.60	▼30.46
Turnout		1,642		
Liberal Democrats hold		Swing		
Liberal Democrats hold		Swing		

=== Downlands and Forest ===
Downlands and Forest
Party	Candidate	Votes	%	±%
Conservative	Edward Heron	714	57.62	▲15.4
Liberal Democrats	Malcolm Connolly	264	21.30	▼25.99
Green	Janet Richards	261	21.06	▲10.59
Majority		450	36.31	
Turnout		1,239		
Conservative gain from Liberal Democrats		Swing		

=== Fawley, Blackfield and Langley ===
Fawley, Blackfield and Langley (2)
Party	Candidate	Votes	%	±%
Conservative	Alexis McEvoy	1,061	57.72	▲17.51
Conservative	Bob Wappet	974		
Liberal Democrats	Barbara Maynard	777	42.27	▼17.51
Liberal Democrats	Malcolm Fidler	698		
Majority		284	15.45	
Turnout		1,838		
Conservative gain from Liberal Democrats		Swing		
Conservative gain from Liberal Democrats		Swing		

=== Fernhill ===
Fernhill (2)
Party	Candidate	Votes	%	±%
Conservative	Jill Cleary	1,479	63.27	▼1.25
Conservative	Sheila Snowden	963		
Liberal Democrats	Zoe Gilbert	464	28.12	▼7.35
Liberal Democrats	Michael Scott-Johns	441		
Labour	Amy Coakes	142	8.60	▲8.60
Majority		580	35.15	▲6.11
Turnout		1,650		
Conservative hold		Swing		
Conservative hold		Swing		

=== Fordingbridge ===
Fordingbridge (2)
Party	Candidate	Votes	%	±%
Liberal Democrats	Michael Shand	1,307	48.21	▼19.91
Liberal Democrats	Miranda Whitehead	1,051		
Conservative	Betty Price	987	36.40	▲4.53
Green	Ann Dennis	296	10.91	▲10.91
Labour	Brian Shemmings	121	4.46	▲4.46
Majority		320	11.80	▼24.44
Turnout		2,711		
Liberal Democrats hold		Swing		
Liberal Democrats hold		Swing		

=== Forest North West ===
Forest North West
Party	Candidate	Votes	%	±%
Conservative	Bill Dow	669	71.62	▲10.87
Liberal Democrats	Peter Kinnison	166	17.77	▼21.47
Green	Bundy Riley	99	10.59	▲10.59
Majority		503	53.85	▲32.35
Turnout		934		
Conservative hold		Swing		

=== Furzedown and Hardley ===
Furzedown and Hardley
Party	Candidate	Votes	%	±%
Liberal Democrats	Graham Parkes	483	60.14	▼12.16
Conservative	Paula Wappet-Madden	320	39.85	▲12.16
Majority		163	20.29	▼24.32
Turnout		803		
Liberal Democrats hold		Swing		

=== Holbury and North Blackfield ===
Holbury and North Blackfield (2)
Party	Candidate	Votes	%	±%
Liberal Democrats	Lee Dunsdon	875	58.45	▼13.22
Liberal Democrats	Kate Lord	741		
Conservative	Allan Glass	481	32.13	▲3.81
Conservative	Philip Pearce-Smith	445		
Labour	Michael Perkins	141	9.41	▲9.41
Majority		394	26.31	▲6.74
Turnout		1,497		
Liberal Democrats hold		Swing		
Liberal Democrats hold		Swing		

=== Hordle ===
Hordle (2)
Party	Candidate	Votes	%	±%
Conservative	Andrew Tinsley	1,255	70.15	▲19.97
Conservative	Penny Lovelace	1,219		
Liberal Democrats	Cliff Lewis	534	29.84	▲16.1
Liberal Democrats	Jacqui Szwaczka	434		
Majority		721	40.30	▲26.19
Turnout		1,789		
Conservative hold		Swing		
Conservative hold		Swing		

=== Hythe West and Langdown ===
Hythe West and Langdown (2)
Party	Candidate	Votes	%	±%
Liberal Democrats	Maureen Robinson	1,269	64.51	▼7.01
Liberal Democrats	Maureen McLean	1,224		
Conservative	Brian Uglow	698	35.48	▲7.01
Conservative	Jo Fowler	676		
Majority		571	29.02	▼14.02
Turnout		1,967		
Liberal Democrats hold		Swing		
Liberal Democrats hold		Swing		

=== Lymington Town ===
Lymington Town (2)
Party	Candidate	Votes	%	±%
Conservative	Elizabeth Lewis	1,505	69.87	▲0.98
Conservative	Anna Rostand	1,485		
Liberal Democrats	Anne Bene	417	19.35	▼9.79
Liberal Democrats	Jan Harber	402		
Green	Caroline Pemberton	232	10.77	▲10.77
Majority		1,088	50.51	▲8.81
Turnout		2,154		
Conservative hold		Swing		
Conservative hold		Swing		

=== Lyndhurst ===
Lyndhurst
Party	Candidate	Votes	%	±%
Conservative	Patricia Wyeth	782	74.97	▲4.35
Liberal Democrats	Keith Petty	166	15.91	▼1.91
Labour	Kenneth Kershaw	95	9.10	▼2.44
Majority		616	59.06	▲6.26
Turnout		1,043		
Conservative hold		Swing		

=== Marchwood ===
Marchwood (2)
Party	Candidate	Votes	%	±%
Conservative	Alison Hoare	777	52.28	▲10.36
Conservative	Alan Shotter	669		
Liberal Democrats	Rolli Rowlands	539	36.27	▼21.8
Liberal Democrats	Graham Walmsley	513		
Green	Beverley Golden	170	11.44	▲11.44
Majority		238	16.01	
Turnout		1,486		
Conservative gain from Liberal Democrats		Swing		
Conservative gain from Liberal Democrats		Swing		

=== Milford ===
Milford (2)
Party	Candidate	Votes	%	±%
Conservative	Melville Kendal	1,512	79.07	▲3.16
Conservative	Michael Pemberton	1,435		
Liberal Democrats	John Stokes	400	20.92	▼3.16
Majority		1,112	58.15	▲6.33
Turnout		1,912		
Conservative hold		Swing		
Conservative hold		Swing		

=== Milton ===
Milton (2)
Party	Candidate	Votes	%	±%
Conservative	Steve Davies	1,087	57.88	▼5.64
Conservative	John Ward	1,015		
Liberal Democrats	Ben Earwicker	666	35.46	▼1.01
Liberal Democrats	Wyn Davies	608		
Labour	Peter Dance	125	6.65	▲6.65
Labour	Stephen Short	112		
Majority		421	22.41	▼5.23
Turnout		1,878		
Conservative hold		Swing		
Conservative hold		Swing		

=== Pennington ===
Pennington (2)
Party	Candidate	Votes	%	±%
Conservative	Penny Jackman	791	47.47	▲16.06
Liberal Democrats	Paul Hickman	775	46.51	▼5.83
Liberal Democrats	Martina Humber	767		
Conservative	Valya Schooling	621		
Labour	Desmond Williams	100	6.00	▲6.00
Turnout		1,666		
Conservative gain from Liberal Democrats		Swing		
Liberal Democrats hold		Swing		

=== Ringwood East and Sopley ===
Ringwood East and Sopley
Party	Candidate	Votes	%	±%
Conservative	Christopher Treleaven	665	75.74	▼0.26
Liberal Democrats	Jan Westbury	213	24.25	▲0.26
Majority		452	51.48	▼0.53
Turnout		878		
Conservative hold		Swing		

=== Ringwood North ===
Ringwood North (2)
Party	Candidate	Votes	%	±%
Conservative	Christine Ford	909	50.61	▼11.77
Conservative	Michael Thierry	817		
Liberal Democrats	Peter Chambers	541	30.12	▼7.49
Liberal Democrats	Terry Scriven	614		
Labour	Peter Harper	175	9.74	▲9.74
Green	Timothy Rowe	171	9.52	▲9.52
Majority		368	20.48	▼4.28
Turnout		1,796		
Conservative hold		Swing		
Conservative hold		Swing		

=== Ringwood South ===
Ringwood South (2)
Party	Candidate	Votes	%	±%
Independent	Danny Cracknell	850	38.95	▼0.80
Conservative	Steve Rippon-Swaine	689	31.57	▼12.54
Conservative	Jeremy Heron	668		
Liberal Democrats	Diane Mortimer	450	20.62	▲4.48
Liberal Democrats	Robert Drew	393		
Labour	Colin Hale	193	8.84	▲8.84
Turnout		2,182		
Independent hold		Swing		
Conservative hold		Swing		

=== Totton Central ===
Totton Central (2)
Party	Candidate	Votes	%	±%
Conservative	Brian Lucas	645	52.05	▲14.23
Conservative	Ron Scrivens	607		
Liberal Democrats	Lesley Edwards	594	47.94	▲4.42
Liberal Democrats	Lorella Weeks	558		
Majority		51	4.11	
Turnout		1,239		
Conservative gain from Liberal Democrats		Swing		
Conservative gain from Liberal Democrats		Swing		

=== Totton East ===
Totton East (2)
Party	Candidate	Votes	%	±%
Conservative	Dean Britton	806	48.14	▼0.81
Conservative	Chris Lagdon	787		
Liberal Democrats	Lin Francis	715	42.71	▼8.33
Liberal Democrats	John Sawyer	680		
BNP	David Green	153	9.13	▲9.13
Majority		91	5.43	
Turnout		1,674		
Conservative gain from Liberal Democrats		Swing		
Conservative gain from Liberal Democrats		Swing		

=== Totton North ===
Totton North (2)
Party	Candidate	Votes	%	±%
Conservative	Mike Reid	758	55.16	▲6.31
Conservative	George Dart	756		
Liberal Democrats	Neal Scott	616	44.83	▼6.31
Liberal Democrats	Jacqueline Shaw	552		
Turnout		142		
Conservative gain from Liberal Democrats		Swing		
Liberal Democrats hold		Swing		

=== Totton South ===
Totton South (2)
Party	Candidate	Votes	%	±%
Liberal Democrats	David Harrison	910	60.02	▲1.91
Liberal Democrats	Alan Weeks	877		
Conservative	Ronnie Belfitt	606	39.97	▼1.91
Conservative	Geoff Read	589		
Majority		304	20.05	▲3.82
Turnout		1,516		
Liberal Democrats hold		Swing		
Liberal Democrats hold		Swing		

=== Totton West ===
Totton West (2)
Party	Candidate	Votes	%	±%
Conservative	Di Brooks	681	53.53	▲1.3
Conservative	Dave Russell	624		
Liberal Democrats	Bill Catt	591	46.46	▼1.3
Liberal Democrats	Len Harris	591		
Majority		90	7.07	
Turnout		1,272		
Conservative gain from Liberal Democrats		Swing		
Conservative hold		Swing		

== Bramshaw, Copythorne North and Minstead by-election ==
Whilst an election for the ward of Bramshaw, Copythrone North and Minstead was due to take place alongside the other elections the death of a candidate lead to a by election being held in June, just over a month later.

Bramshaw, Copythorne North and Minstead By-Election 14 June 2007
Party	Candidate	Votes	%	±%
Conservative	Henry Forse	436	78.0	+4.9
Liberal Democrats	Anthony Gray	123	22.0	−4.9
Majority		313	56.0	
Turnout		559	26.2	
Conservative hold		Swing		
