= 1999 New Forest District Council election =

1999 UK local government election

Elections to New Forest District Council were held on 6 May 1999. The whole council was up for election and the Conservative party gained overall control of the council from the Liberal Democrat party.

== Election result ==
New Forest local election result 1999
Party	Seats	Gains	Losses	Net gain/loss	Seats %	Votes %	Votes	+/−
Conservative	30			+7	51.7	50.4	41,530	
Liberal Democrats	25			-6	43.1	41.4	34,073	
Independent	3			-1	5.2	3.2	2,664	
Labour	0	0	0	0	0	5.0	4,100	

== Ward results ==
=== Barton ===
Barton (2)
Party	Candidate	Votes	%	±%
Conservative	Kenneth Austin	974	75.5	
Conservative	John Hutchins	903		
Liberal Democrats	David Hart	340	24.5	
Liberal Democrats	Roger Dagnall	270		
Turnout		2,487	37.0	

=== Bashley ===
Bashley (2)
Party	Candidate	Votes	%	±%
Conservative	Alan Rice	1,339	69.5	
Conservative	Delia Wilson	1,223		
Liberal Democrats	John Burton	471	23.1	
Liberal Democrats	Dean Hall	382		
Labour	Nicholas Fleming	273	7.4	
Turnout		3,688	31.0	

Becton (2)
Party	Candidate	Votes	%	±%
Conservative	Michael Kidman	1,112	68.6	
Conservative	Paul Woods	1,105		
Liberal Democrats	Peter Fullick	510	31.4	
Liberal Democrats	Beverley Scott-Johns	505		
Turnout		3,232	32.0	

=== Blackfield and Langley ===
Blackfield and Langley (2)
Party	Candidate	Votes	%	±%
Liberal Democrats	Barbara Maynard	747	54.1	
Liberal Democrats	Audrey Howe	607		
Conservative	Alexis McEvoy	497	37.3	
Conservative	Olivia Foster	437		
Labour	Michael Perkins	213	8.5	
Turnout		2,501	34.0	

=== Boldre ===
Boldre
Party	Candidate	Votes	%	±%
Conservative	Colin Wise	498	76.5	
Liberal Democrats	Margaret Cooper	153	23.5	
Majority		345	53.0	
Turnout		651	42.0	

=== Bransgore and Sopley ===
Bransgore and Sopley
Party	Candidate	Votes	%	±%
Liberal Democrats	Richard Frampton	1,022	62.7	
Conservative	Mark Crader	608	37.3	
Majority		414	25.4	
Turnout		1,630	40.0	

=== Brockenhurst ===
Brockenhurst
Party	Candidate	Votes	%	±%
Conservative	Maureen Holding	815	70.3	
Labour	Ruth Rollin	177	15.3	
Liberal Democrats	Freda Angelou	167	14.4	
Majority		638	55.0	
Turnout		1,159	42.0	

=== Colbury ===
Colbury
Party	Candidate	Votes	%	±%
Independent	Geoffrey Spikins	330	57.3	
Labour	Peter Sopowski	183	31.8	
Liberal Democrats	John Ramsbottom	63	10.9	
Majority		147	25.5	
Turnout		576	33.0	

=== Copythorne South ===
Copythorne South
Party	Candidate	Votes	%	±%
Conservative	Derek Tipp	338	57.4	
Liberal Democrats	William Croydon	251	42.6	
Majority		87	14.8	
Turnout		589	39.0	

=== Dibden and Hythe ===
Dibden and Hythe (3)
Party	Candidate	Votes	%	±%
Liberal Democrats	Stanley Wade	1,448	63.9%	
Liberal Democrats	Maureen Robinson	1,412		
Liberal Democrats	Carolyn Gradidge	1,345		
Conservative	Trevor Johnson	842	36.1%	
Conservative	David Phillips	828		
Conservative	Mary Tollett	710		
Turnout		5,137	33.7	

=== Dibden Purlieu ===
Dibden Purlieu
Party	Candidate	Votes	%	±%
Liberal Democrats	Brenda Smith	636	64.9	
Conservative	Marguerita Wrightson	344	35.1	
Majority		292	39.8	
Turnout		980	38.6	

=== Downlands ===
Downlands
Party	Candidate	Votes	%	±%
Liberal Democrats	George Locock	373	56.5	
Conservative	Martin Hasker	287	43.5	
Majority		86	13.0	
Turnout		660	45.0	

=== Fawley and Holbury ===
Fawley and Holbury (3)
Party	Candidate	Votes	%	±%
Liberal Democrats	John Coles	989	53.4%	
Liberal Democrats	Lee Dunsdon	809		
Liberal Democrats	Malcolm Fidler	709		
Conservative	Barry Brooks	618	37.8%	
Conservative	Michael Curry	578		
Conservative	Philip Pearce-Smith	575		
Labour	Debra Adamson	413	8.8	
Turnout		4,691	28.0	

=== Fordingbridge ===
Fordingbridge (2)
Party	Candidate	Votes	%	±%
Liberal Democrats	Robert Hale	1,118	64.4	
Liberal Democrats	Michael Shand	1,077		
Conservative	Colette Goodhand-Tait	632	35.6	
Conservative	Katherine Heron	584		
Turnout		3,411	37.0	

=== Forest North ===
Forest North
Party	Candidate	Votes	%	±%
Conservative	David Scott	424	50.8	
Liberal Democrats	Margaret Ferguson	410	49.2	
Majority		14	1.6	
Turnout		834	45.8	

=== Forest North West ===
Forest North West
Party	Candidate	Votes	%	±%
Conservative	William Dow	552	54.1	
Liberal Democrats	Miranda Whitehead	469	45.9	
Majority		83	8.2	
Turnout		1,021	50.0	

=== Forest South ===
Forest South
Party	Candidate	Votes	%	±%
Conservative	Susan Abernethy	501	75.8	
Liberal Democrats	Arthur Hurrell	160	24.2	
Majority		341	51.6	
Turnout		661	37.4	

=== Forest West ===
Forest West (2)
Party	Candidate	Votes	%	±%
Conservative	Patricia Drake	986	73.8	
Conservative	Peter Greenfield	936		
Liberal Democrats	Lynn Marsden	363	26.2	
Liberal Democrats	Malcolm Connolly	319		
Turnout		2,604	32.7	

=== Hordle ===
Hordle (2)
Party	Candidate	Votes	%	±%
Conservative	John Hoy	1,063	42.6	
Independent	Ernest Bowring	802	32.2	
Liberal Democrats	Jacqueline Szwaczka	328		
Liberal Democrats	Susan Cole	301		
Turnout		2,494	36.0	

=== Hythe South ===
Hythe South (3)
Party	Candidate	Votes	%	±%
Liberal Democrats	Brian Dash	1,111		
Liberal Democrats	Maureen McLean	936		
Liberal Democrats	Malcolm Wade	901		
Conservative	Brian Uglow	475		
Conservative	Brenda Spearing	456		
Conservative	Kay Moulsdale	448		
Labour	Jon Francis	369		
Turnout		4,696	28.7	

=== Lymington Town ===
Lymington Town (3)
Party	Candidate	Votes	%	±%
Conservative	Simon Hayes	1,816		
Conservative	Kevin Ault	1,726		
Conservative	Thomas Russell	1,652		
Liberal Democrats	Patricia Johnson	737		
Liberal Democrats	Peter Easton	696		
Liberal Democrats	Edward Jearrad	642		
Labour	Kathleen Smith	312		
Turnout		7,581	37.1	

=== Lyndhurst ===
Lyndhurst
Party	Candidate	Votes	%	±%
Conservative	Patricia Wyeth	741	77.6	
Labour	Kenneth Kershaw	109	11.4	
Liberal Democrats	Rosemary Gregory	105	11.0	
Majority		632	66.2	
Turnout		955	38.9	

=== Marchwood ===
Marchwood
Party	Candidate	Votes	%	±%
Liberal Democrats	Gordon Richardson	508	50.9	
Conservative	Alan Shotter	366	36.7	
Labour	Olive Bevan	124	12.4	
Majority		142	14.2	
Turnout		998	27.0	

=== Milford ===
Milford (2)
Party	Candidate	Votes	%	±%
Conservative	Melville Kendal	1,258		
Conservative	Timothy Droogleever	1,215		
Liberal Democrats	Roger Hedge	304		
Liberal Democrats	Nicola Williams	225		
Labour	Mary Tolfree	194		
Turnout		3,196	40.4	

=== Milton ===
Milton (2)
Party	Candidate	Votes	%	±%
Liberal Democrats	Benjamin Earwicker	727		
Conservative	Benjamin Rule	705		
Liberal Democrats	Wynford Davies	667		
Conservative	Donald Tungate	656		
Turnout		2,755	36.0	

=== Netley Marsh ===
Netley Marsh
Party	Candidate	Votes	%	±%
Conservative	Derek Burdle	438	78.6	
Liberal Democrats	David Russell	76	13.6	
Labour	Frederick Long	43	7.7	
Majority		362	65.0	
Turnout		557	32.8	

=== Pennington ===
Pennington (2)
Party	Candidate	Votes	%	±%
Liberal Democrats	Martina Powell	799		
Conservative	Peter Cummings	717		
Liberal Democrats	Paul Hickman	690		
Conservative	Alan Joyce	687		
Independent	Maurice White	250		
Turnout		3,143	38.0	

=== Ringwood North ===
Ringwood North (2)
Party	Candidate	Votes	%	±%
Conservative	John Waddington	794		
Conservative	Michael Thierry	698		
Liberal Democrats	Poppy Baker	337		
Liberal Democrats	Veronica Sullivan	284		
Labour	Audrey Walker	176		
Turnout		2,289	32.1	

=== Ringwood South ===
Ringwood South (2)
Party	Candidate	Votes	%	±%
Independent	Daniel Cracknell	741		
Conservative	Jeremy Heron	622		
Liberal Democrats	Peter Baker	317		
Labour	Clive Coldwell	256		
Liberal Democrats	Peter Chambers	228		
Turnout		2,164	27.7	

=== Sway ===
Sway
Party	Candidate	Votes	%	±%
Conservative	Barry Rickman	958	78.5	
Liberal Democrats	Susan Lewis	263	21.5	
Majority		695	57.0	
Turnout		1,221	45.0	

=== Totton Central ===
Totton Central (3)
Party	Candidate	Votes	%	±%
Liberal Democrats	Frank Harrison	948		
Liberal Democrats	Stephen Shepherd	889		
Liberal Democrats	Leonard Harris	783		
Conservative	Marjorie Wickham	674		
Conservative	Marion Emery	642		
Conservative	Arthur Emery	637		
Labour	Alan Goodfellow	564		
Independent	Margaret Bannister	541		
Turnout		5,678	22.8	

=== Totton North ===
Totton North (3)
Party	Candidate	Votes	%	±%
Liberal Democrats	John Dawson	854		
Conservative	Diana Brooks	699		
Liberal Democrats	Frank Bright	693		
Conservative	Penelope Rose	672		
Conservative	Christopher Webb	667		
Liberal Democrats	Fiona Downer	666		
Labour	Jennifer Ovenden	423		
Turnout		5,036	26.7	

=== Totton South ===
Totton South (2)
Party	Candidate	Votes	%	±%
Liberal Democrats	Linda Snashall	516		
Conservative	William Catt	433		
Liberal Democrats	Sharon Thery	417		
Conservative	Alan Leaver	369		
Labour	Joyce Hopgood	271		
Turnout		2,006	24.4	
