= Alexander Bell (sportsman) =

Argentine-born English cricketer and rugby union player

Personal information
- Full name: Alexander Patrick Bell
- Born: 23 February 1915; Rosario, Santa Fe, Argentina
- Died: 12 April 1956 (aged 41); Oxford, Oxfordshire, England
- Batting: Right-handed

Domestic team information
- Years: Team
- 1946–1949: Hertfordshire
- 1934: Northamptonshire

Career statistics
Competition	First-class
Matches	3
Runs scored	37
Batting average	6.16
100s/50s	–/–
Top score	24
Balls bowled	–
Wickets	–
Bowling average	–
5 wickets in innings	–
10 wickets in match	–
Best bowling	–
Catches/stumpings	2/–
- Source: Cricinfo, 17 November 2011

Alexander (Alec) Patrick Bell (23 February 1915 – 12 April 1956) was an Argentine-born English cricketer and rugby union player. Bell was a right-handed batsman and played centre for the Northampton Saints rugby team. He was born at Rosario, Santa Fe.

Bell made three first-class appearances for Northamptonshire in the 1934 County Championship against Worcestershire, Middlesex and Glamorgan. In these three matches, he scored a total of just 37 runs at an average of 6.16, with a high score of 24. He later made thirteen Minor Counties Championship appearances for Hertfordshire between 1946 and 1949.

As a rugby player he was a prolific try-scoring centre and captained the Northampton Saints for 3 years from 1943 to 1946.

Bell died from a brain trauma at Oxford, Oxfordshire on 12 April 1956.
