= 2023 New Forest District Council election =

2023 English local election

- 4 May 2023

All 48 seats to New Forest District Council 25 seats needed for a majority

	First party	Second party	Third party
Leader	Jill Cleary	Malcolm Wade
Party	Conservative	Liberal Democrats	Independent
Last election	46 seats, 58.9%	13 seats, 23.8%	1 seat, 2.6%
Seats won	26	14	4
Seat change	▼20	▲1	▲3
Popular vote	34,767	24,010	6,111
Percentage	42.1%	29.1%	7.4%
Swing	▼16.8%	▲5.3%	▲4.8%
	Fourth party	Fifth party
Party	Green	Labour
Last election	0 seats, 3.2%	0 seats, 10.8%
Seats won	3	1
Seat change	▲3	▲1
Popular vote	5,713	11,795
Percentage	6.9%	14.3%
Swing	▲3.7%	▲3.5%
- Winner of each seat at the 2023 New Forest District Council election
Leader before election
Jill Cleary
Conservative
Leader after election
Jill Cleary
Conservative

The 2023 New Forest District Council election took place on 4 May 2023 to elect members of New Forest District Council in Hampshire, England. This was on the same day as other local elections in England.

Prior to the election the council was under Conservative majority control. New ward boundaries came into effect for this election, reducing the number of seats on the council from 60 to 48. The Conservatives retained majority control.

== Summary ==
=== Election result ===
2023 New Forest District election
Party	Candidates	Seats	Gains	Losses	Net gain/loss	Seats %	Votes %	Votes	+/−
Conservative	48	26	N/A	N/A	▼20	54.2	42.1	34,767	–16.8
Liberal Democrats	40	14	N/A	N/A	▲1	29.2	29.1	24,010	+5.3
Independent	8	4	N/A	N/A	▲3	8.3	7.4	6,111	+4.8
Green	14	3	N/A	N/A	▲3	6.3	6.9	5,713	+3.7
Labour	46	1	N/A	N/A	▲1	2.1	14.3	11,795	+3.5
Britain First	1	0	N/A	N/A	Steady	0.0	0.1	108	N/A

== Ward results ==
The results for each ward were as follows:

=== Ashley, Bashley and Fernhill ===
Ashley, Bashley and Fernhill (2 seats)
Party	Candidate	Votes	%	±%
Conservative	Geoffrey Blunden	981	50.3	
Conservative	Jill Cleary	972	49.8	
Liberal Democrats	Beverley Scott-Johns	438	22.5	
Liberal Democrats	Simon Morgan	337	17.3	
Labour	Chloe Bellamy	308	15.8	
Green	Paul Moxey	271	13.9	
Labour	Katherine Roberts	244	12.5	
Green	John Pemberton	149	7.6	
Majority		534		
Turnout		1,951	31	
Registered electors		6,422		
Conservative win (new seat)				
Conservative win (new seat)				

=== Ashurst, Bramshaw, Copythorne and Netley Marsh ===
Ashurst, Bramshaw, Copythorne and Netley Marsh (2 seats)
Party	Candidate	Votes	%	±%
Conservative	Derek Tipp	1,027	46.7	
Independent	Joe Reilly	966	44.0	
Conservative	James Hartley-Binns	740	33.7	
Liberal Democrats	Benjamin Thompson	540	24.6	
Labour	Muriel Frend	350	15.9	
Labour	Timothy Mawby	272	12.4	
Majority				
Turnout		2,197	36	
Registered electors		6,102		
Conservative win (new seat)				
Independent win (new seat)				

=== Ballard ===
Ballard (1 seat)
Party	Candidate	Votes	%	±%
Conservative	Neil Tungate	348	40.7	
Labour	Helen Wallis-Dowling	167	19.6	
Liberal Democrats	Charles Baker	137	16.0	
Britain First	Nick Lambert	108	12.6	
Green	Emily Hamilton	94	11.0	
Majority		181		
Turnout		854	28	
Registered electors		3,122		
Conservative win (new seat)				

=== Barton and Becton ===
Barton and Becton (2 seats)
Party	Candidate	Votes	%	±%
Conservative	Keith Craze	1,147	56.3	
Conservative	Alan O'Sullivan	1,087	53.3	
Liberal Democrats	Rainer Preis	489	24.0	
Liberal Democrats	Susan Lewis	421	20.6	
Green	Kristina Bourdillon	310	15.2	
Green	Day Macaskill	216	10.6	
Labour	Peter Terry	200	9.8	
Majority		598		
Turnout		2,039	35	
Registered electors		5,965		
Conservative win (new seat)				
Conservative win (new seat)				

=== Bransgore, Burley, Sopley and Ringwood East ===
Bransgore, Burley, Sopley and Ringwood East (2 seats)
Party	Candidate	Votes	%	±%
Independent	Nigel Linford	805	41.9	
Green	Neil Millington	725	37.7	
Conservative	John Adams	649	33.7	
Green	Anna Collar	581	30.2	
Conservative	Dean Samber	514	26.7	
Labour	Pippa Haywood	179	9.3	
Labour	Kevin Flack	130	6.8	
Majority				
Turnout		1,923	35	
Registered electors		5,491		
Independent win (new seat)				
Green win (new seat)				

=== Brockenhurst and Denny Lodge ===
Brockenhurst and Denny Lodge (1 seat)
Party	Candidate	Votes	%	±%
Green	Adam Parker	671	50.9	
Conservative	Michael Harris	528	40.1	
Labour	Jon Horne	118	9.0	
Majority				
Turnout		1,317	44	
Registered electors		3,027		
Green win (new seat)				

=== Dibden and Dibden Purlieu ===
Dibden and Dibden Purlieu (2 seats)
Party	Candidate	Votes	%	±%
Liberal Democrats	Malcolm Wade	1,025	59.6	
Liberal Democrats	Stephanie Osborne	874	50.8	
Conservative	Emily Heron	506	29.4	
Conservative	David Twydell	455	26.5	
Labour	Leigh Smith	170	9.9	
Labour	Brian Wilkinson	137	8.0	
Majority				
Turnout		1,720	33	
Registered electors		5,266		
Liberal Democrats win (new seat)				
Liberal Democrats win (new seat)				

=== Downlands and Forest North ===
Downlands and Forest North (1 seat)
Party	Candidate	Votes	%	±%
Green	Janet Richards	562	49.0	
Conservative	Annie Bellows	496	43.2	
Labour	Martin Phillips	90	7.8	
Majority				
Turnout		1,148	41	
Registered electors		2,814		
Green win (new seat)				

=== Fawley, Blackfield, Calshot and Langley ===
Fawley, Blackfield, Calshot and Langley (2 seats)
Party	Candidate	Votes	%	±%
Conservative	Alan Alvey	747	50.3	
Conservative	Matthew Hartmann	693	46.6	
Liberal Democrats	Angela Pearson	499	33.6	
Liberal Democrats	Jeni Rose	451	30.3	
Labour	Patricia Gillam	214	14.4	
Labour	Michael Garside	206	13.9	
Majority				
Turnout		1,486	28	
Registered electors		5,427		
Conservative win (new seat)				
Conservative win (new seat)				

=== Fordingbridge, Godshill and Hyde ===
Fordingbridge, Godshill and Hyde (2 seats)
Party	Candidate	Votes	%	±%
Liberal Democrats	David Millar	1,118	52.7	
Liberal Democrats	Phil Woods	1,085	51.1	
Conservative	Ann Sevier	725	34.2	
Conservative	Robert Heron	673	31.7	
Labour	Leila Cameron	270	12.7	
Labour	Jasmine Bessey	215	10.1	
Majority				
Turnout		2,122	35	
Registered electors		6,120		
Liberal Democrats win (new seat)				
Liberal Democrats win (new seat)				

=== Forest and Solent ===
Forest and Solent (1 seat)
Party	Candidate	Votes	%	±%
Conservative	Dan Poole	554	50.4	
Green	James Gallagher	380	34.5	
Labour	Vincent Slattery	166	15.1	
Majority		174	15.8	
Turnout		1,104	37	
Registered electors		2,987		
Rejected ballots		4	0.4	
Conservative win (new seat)				

=== Hardley, Holbury and North Blackfield ===
Hardley, Holbury and North Blackfield (2 seats)
Party	Candidate	Votes	%	±%
Conservative	Allan Glass	463	35.8	
Independent	Peter Armstrong	393	30.4	
Conservative	Josie Poole	375	29.0	
Independent	Paul Saunders	253	19.6	
Labour	Sherri Johnstone	238	18.4	
Liberal Democrats	Sally Read	236	18.3	
Labour	Ceri Roberts	221	17.1	
Liberal Democrats	David Cole	177	13.7	
Majority				
Turnout		1,292	25	
Registered electors		5,296		
Conservative win (new seat)				
Independent win (new seat)				

=== Hythe Central ===
Hythe Central (2 seats)
Party	Candidate	Votes	%	±%
Liberal Democrats	Alex Wade	1,112	56.1	
Liberal Democrats	Phillip Dowd	970	49.0	
Conservative	Chris Harrison	741	37.4	
Conservative	Terri Marwood	685	34.6	
Labour	Ivan Caric	147	7.4	
Labour	Scott Saffin	128	6.5	
Majority				
Turnout		1,981	37	
Registered electors		5,359		
Liberal Democrats win (new seat)				
Liberal Democrats win (new seat)				

=== Hythe South ===
Hythe South (2 seats)
Party	Candidate	Votes	%	±%
Liberal Democrats	Mark Clark	736	55.1	
Liberal Democrats	Sean Cullen	704	52.7	
Conservative	Eric Davey	364	27.3	
Conservative	Brenda Spearing	346	25.9	
Labour	Clare Davison	186	13.9	
Labour	Katherine Herbert	171	12.8	
Majority				
Turnout		1,335	25	
Registered electors		5,426		
Liberal Democrats win (new seat)				
Liberal Democrats win (new seat)				

=== Lymington ===
Lymington (2 seats)
Party	Candidate	Votes	%	±%
Conservative	Barry Dunning	962	41.6	
Independent	Jacqui England	880	38.0	
Conservative	Simon Smith	723	31.2	
Liberal Democrats	Hannah Phillips	586	25.3	
Liberal Democrats	Ted Jearrad	528	22.8	
Labour	Trina Hart	348	15.0	
Labour	Jerry Weber	250	10.8	
Majority				
Turnout		2,314	37	
Registered electors		6,422		
Conservative win (new seat)				
Independent win (new seat)				

=== Lyndhurst and Minstead ===
Lyndhurst and Minstead (1 seat)
Party	Candidate	Votes	%	±%
Liberal Democrats	Hilary Brand	577	48.8	
Conservative	Brice Stratford	475	40.2	
Labour	Christopher Willsher	130	11.0	
Majority		102	8.6	
Turnout		1,182	40	
Registered electors		3,004		
Liberal Democrats win (new seat)				

=== Marchwood and Eling ===
Marchwood and Eling (2 seats)
Party	Candidate	Votes	%	±%
Conservative	Richard Young	938	50.9	
Liberal Democrats	Patrick Mballa	776	42.1	
Conservative	Sue Bennison	694	37.7	
Liberal Democrats	Lindsey Shelley	685	37.2	
Labour	Kenneth Kershaw	197	10.7	
Labour	Dave Moran	194	10.5	
Majority				
Turnout		1,842	31	
Registered electors		6,061		
Conservative win (new seat)				
Liberal Democrats win (new seat)				

=== Milford and Hordle ===
Milford and Hordle (3 seats)
Party	Candidate	Votes	%	±%
Conservative	David Hawkins	1,418	43.6	
Conservative	Christine Ward	1,339	41.2	
Conservative	Alvin Reid	1,317	40.5	
Independent	Ivor Spreadbury	1,000	30.8	
Liberal Democrats	Emily Jagger	936	28.8	
Green	Dominic Boddington	827	25.4	
Liberal Democrats	Sandra Delemare	705	21.7	
Labour	Helen Sloan	488	15.0	
Labour	Stuart Nundy	335	10.3	
Majority				
Turnout		3,250	36	
Registered electors		8,928		
Conservative win (new seat)				
Conservative win (new seat)				
Conservative win (new seat)				

=== Milton ===
Milton (2 seats)
Party	Candidate	Votes	%	±%
Conservative	Steve Davies	822	51.1	
Conservative	Steve Clarke	810	50.4	
Liberal Democrats	Wyn Davies	598	37.2	
Liberal Democrats	Jo Drayton	497	30.9	
Labour	Martin Ashman	295	18.3	
Majority				
Turnout		1,608	29	
Registered electors		5,624		
Conservative win (new seat)				
Conservative win (new seat)				

=== Pennington ===
Pennington (2 seats)
Party	Candidate	Votes	%	±%
Liberal Democrats	Jack Davies	1,007	54.5	
Liberal Democrats	Colm McCarthy	785	42.5	
Conservative	Tom Brindley	612	33.1	
Conservative	Ian Loveless	541	29.3	
Labour	Bronwen Bridges	283	15.3	
Labour	Joanna Sawkins	261	14.1	
Majority				
Turnout		1,847	30	
Registered electors		6,247		
Liberal Democrats win (new seat)				
Liberal Democrats win (new seat)				

=== Ringwood North & Ellingham ===
Ringwood North & Ellingham (2 seats)
Party	Candidate	Votes	%	±%
Conservative	Michael Thierry	788	40.3	
Labour	John Haywood	754	38.6	
Labour	Peter Kelleher	746	38.2	
Conservative	Derek Scott	726	37.2	
Green	Jerry Fenner	253	12.9	
Liberal Democrats	Luke Dadford	248	12.7	
Liberal Democrats	Liz Barron	224	11.5	
Majority				
Turnout		1,954	32	
Registered electors		6,148		
Conservative win (new seat)				
Labour win (new seat)				

=== Ringwood South ===
Ringwood South (2 seats)
Party	Candidate	Votes	%	±%
Conservative	Jeremy Heron	534	29.4	
Conservative	Stephen Rippon-Swaine	517	28.4	
Labour	James Swyer	487	26.8	
Labour	Glenys Turner	482	26.5	
Independent	Philip Day	481	26.4	
Independent	Gareth Deboos	464	25.5	
Green	Timothy Rowe	187	10.3	
Liberal Democrats	Jeremy Allen	180	9.9	
Liberal Democrats	Cameron McDonald	144	7.9	
Majority				
Turnout		1,819	31	
Registered electors		5,959		
Conservative win (new seat)				
Conservative win (new seat)				

=== Sway ===
Sway (1 seat)
Party	Candidate	Votes	%	±%
Conservative	Barry Rickman	737	55.3	
Green	Simon King	487	36.6	
Labour	Peter Dance	108	8.1	
Majority				
Turnout		1,332	46	
Registered electors		2,883		
Conservative win (new seat)				

=== Totton Central ===
Totton Central (2 seats)
Party	Candidate	Votes	%	±%
Conservative	John Sleep	647	36.1	
Conservative	Ian Murray	596	33.3	
Liberal Democrats	Stephen Shepherd	568	31.7	
Liberal Democrats	Matt Kangarani	555	31.0	
Labour	Adrian Johnstone	330	18.4	
Labour	David Smith	287	16.0	
Independent	Ian Coombes	243	13.6	
Independent	Frances Orchard	180	10.1	
Majority				
Turnout		1,791	32	
Registered electors		5,653		
Conservative win (new seat)				
Conservative win (new seat)				

=== Totton North ===
Totton North (3 seats)
Party	Candidate	Votes	%	±%
Conservative	Neville Penman	1,054	50.4	
Conservative	Dave Penny	814	38.9	
Conservative	Kathleen Crisell	774	37.0	
Liberal Democrats	Lin Francis	505	24.1	
Liberal Democrats	Alex Brunsdon	501	23.9	
Liberal Democrats	Steve Hardingson	457	21.8	
Labour	Lynne Garrick	340	16.3	
Labour	Roland Bishop	333	15.9	
Labour	Kenneth Garrick	322	15.4	
Independent	Ron Scrivens	229	10.9	
Independent	Chris Lagdon	217	10.4	
Majority				
Turnout		2,092	25	
Registered electors		8,484		
Conservative win (new seat)				
Conservative win (new seat)				
Conservative win (new seat)				

=== Totton South ===
Totton South (2 seats)
Party	Candidate	Votes	%	±%
Liberal Democrats	David Harrison	904	54.8	
Liberal Democrats	Caroline Rackham	695	42.1	
Conservative	Lisa Carter	607	36.8	
Conservative	Len Harris	506	30.7	
Labour	Alan Goodfellow	191	11.6	
Labour	Kit Rodgers	157	9.5	
Majority				
Turnout		1,649	27	
Registered electors		6,096		
Liberal Democrats win (new seat)				
Liberal Democrats win (new seat)				

== Changes 2023-2027 ==
=== By-elections ===
==== Bransgore, Burley, Sopley & Ringwood East ====
Bransgore, Burley, Sopley & Ringwood East by-election: 13 February 2025
Party	Candidate	Votes	%	±%
Conservative	Richard Frampton	997	60.0	+32.5
Green	Barbara Czoch	314	18.9	–11.8
Reform	Adam Elcock	257	15.5	N/A
Liberal Democrats	Iestyn Lewis	52	3.1	N/A
Labour	Sally Johnston	42	2.5	–5.1
Majority		683	41.1	N/A
Turnout		1,663	30.0	–5.0
Registered electors		5,541		
Conservative gain from Green		Swing	▲22.2	
