= 2019 New Forest District Council election =

2019 UK local government election

- 2 May 2019

All 60 seats to New Forest District Council 31 seats needed for a majority
	First party	Second party	Third party
Party	Conservative	Liberal Democrats	Independent
Seats before	58	2	0
Seats won	46	13	1
Seat change	▼12	▲11	▲1
Popular vote	43,302	17,509	1,884
- Results by Ward
Council control before election
Conservative
Council control after election
Conservative

The 2019 New Forest District Council election took place on 2 May 2019 to elect members of New Forest District Council in England. This was on the same day as other local elections. The Conservatives were the only party to stand enough candidates to gain an outright majority, as they were the only party to stand a candidate in more than half the seats, with Liberal Democrats, who defended 2 seats, standing 28 candidates, and Labour, which had no incumbents, standing 30 candidates.

== Summary ==
=== Election result ===
2019 New Forest District Council election
Party	Candidates	Seats	Gains	Losses	Net gain/loss	Seats %	Votes %	Votes	+/−
Conservative	60	46	0	12	▼12	76.7	58.9	43,302	+8.3
Liberal Democrats	28	13	11	0	▲11	21.7	23.8	17,509	+12.6
Independent	5	1	1	0	▲1	1.7	2.6	1,884	+0.9
Labour	30	0	0	0	Steady	0.0	10.8	7,975	–3.4
Green	5	0	0	0	Steady	0.0	3.2	2,333	–3.3
UKIP	2	0	0	0	Steady	0.0	0.8	572	–14.7

== Ward results ==
=== Ashurst, Copythorne South & Netley Marsh ===
Ashurst, Copythorne South & Netley Marsh (2 seats)
Party	Candidate	Votes	%	±%
Conservative	Derek Tipp	923	58.6	
Conservative	Joseph Reilly	899	57.0	
Liberal Democrats	Amy Hardingson	625	39.7	
Majority		274	17.3	
Turnout		1,576	34.0	
Registered electors		4,694		
Conservative hold				
Conservative hold				

=== Barton ===
Barton (2 seats)
Party	Candidate	Votes	%	±%
Conservative	Keith Craze	1,129	67.3	
Conservative	Alan O'Sullivan	1,123	66.9	
Liberal Democrats	Chloe Bellamy	498	29.7	
Labour Co-op	Peter Terry	264	9.9	
Majority		625	37.2	
Turnout		1,678	36.0	
Registered electors		4,877		
Conservative hold				
Conservative hold				

=== Bashley ===
Bashley (1 seat)
Party	Candidate	Votes	%	±%
Conservative	Donald Tungate	599	80.18	▲13.02
Labour	Susan Seymour	148	19.81	▲7.26
Majority		451	60.37	▲13.48
Turnout		747	34.0	
Registered electors		2,278		
Conservative hold		Swing		

=== Becton ===
Becton (2 seats)
Party	Candidate	Votes	%	±%
Conservative	Geoffrey Blunden	731	57.6	
Conservative	Christine Ward	682	53.7	
Liberal Democrats	Wynford Davies	335	26.4	
UKIP	Ann Vasilesco	217	17.1	
Labour	Ann Russell	184	14.5	
Majority		347	27.3	
Turnout		1,270	32.0	
Registered electors		4,077		
Conservative hold				
Conservative hold				

=== Boldre & Sway ===
Boldre & Sway (2 seats)
Party	Candidate	Votes	%	±%
Conservative	Barry Rickman	1,053	61.3	
Conservative	Janette Duke	854	49.7	
Green	Katherine Wilcox	843	49.0	
Majority		11	0.7	
Turnout		1,719	39.0	
Registered electors		4,460		
Conservative hold				
Conservative hold				

=== Bramshaw, Copythorne North & Minstead ===
Bramshaw, Copythorne North & Minstead (1 seat)
Party	Candidate	Votes	%	±%
Conservative	Diane Andrews	Unopposed		
Conservative hold				

=== Bransgore & Burley ===
Bransgore & Burley (2 seats)
Party	Candidate	Votes	%	±%
Conservative	Martyn Levitt	1,002	69.8	
Conservative	Mark Steele	964	67.1	
Labour	Aimee Geyther	385	26.8	
Majority		579	40.3	
Turnout		1,436	33.0	
Registered electors		4,495		
Conservative hold				
Conservative hold				

=== Brockenhurst & Forest South ===
Brockenhurst & Forest South (2 seats)
Party	Candidate	Votes	%	±%
Conservative	Maureen Holding	950	53.8	
Conservative	Michael Harris	948	53.7	
Liberal Democrats	Ruth Rollin	630	35.7	
Green	Henry Mellor	586	33.2	
Labour	Peter Dance	209	11.8	
Majority		318	18.0	
Turnout		1,766	39.0	
Registered electors		4,547		
Conservative hold				
Conservative hold				

=== Buckland ===
Buckland (1 seat)
Party	Candidate	Votes	%	±%
Conservative	Anne Corbridge	356	46.35	▼4.68
Liberal Democrats	Sandra Tyler	190	24.73	▲10.22
Independent	Edward Jearrad	116	15.10	▼4.00
Labour	Bronwen Bridges	106	13.80	▼1.53
Majority		166	21.61	▼10.31
Turnout		768	28.0	
Registered electors		2,759		
Conservative hold		Swing		

=== Butts Ash & Dibden Purlieu ===
Butts Ash & Dibden Purlieu (2 seats)
Party	Candidate	Votes	%	±%
Liberal Democrats	Malcolm Wade	1,096	61.6	
Liberal Democrats	Stephenie Osbourne	901	50.6	
Conservative	James Binns	669	37.6	
Conservative	Peter Armstrong	650	36.5	
Majority		232	13.0	
Turnout		1,780	36.0	
Registered electors		5,052		
Liberal Democrats gain from Conservative				
Liberal Democrats gain from Conservative				

=== Dibden & Hythe ===
Dibden & Hythe (2 seats)
Party	Candidate	Votes	%	±%
Liberal Democrats	Sandra Delemare	804	54.1	
Liberal Democrats	Philip Dowd	745	50.1	
Conservative	Christopher Harrison	617	41.5	
Conservative	Daniel Poole	609	41.0	
Majority		128	8.6	
Turnout		1,487	34.0	
Registered electors		4,547		
Liberal Democrats gain from Conservative				
Liberal Democrats gain from Conservative				

=== Downlands & Forest ===
Downlands & Forest (1 seat)
Party	Candidate	Votes	%	±%
Conservative	Edward Heron	597	60.73	▼17.73
Green	Janet Richards	315	32.04	▲32.04
Labour	Paul Toynton	71	7.22	▼14.31
Majority		282	28.68	▲28.25
Turnout		983	42.0	
Registered electors		2,401		
Conservative hold		Swing		

=== Fawley, Blackfield & Langley ===
Fawley, Blackfield & Langley (2 seats)
Party	Candidate	Votes	%	±%
Conservative	Alexis McEvoy	817	56.3	
Conservative	Alan Alvey	783	54.0	
Liberal Democrats	Sally-Jane Read	584	40.2	
Liberal Democrats	Roger Stephens	493	34.0	
Majority		199	13.8	
Turnout		1,451	32.0	
Registered electors		4,723		
Conservative hold				
Conservative hold				

=== Fernhill ===
Fernhill (2 seats)
Party	Candidate	Votes	%	±%
Conservative	Jill Cleary	872	66.9	
Conservative	John Ward	836	64.1	
Labour	Helen Wallis-Dowling	389	29.8	
Labour	Stephen Short	309	23.7	
Majority		447	34.3	
Turnout		1,304	28.0	
Registered electors		4,921		
Conservative hold				
Conservative hold				

=== Fordingbridge ===
Fordingbridge (2 seats)
Party	Candidate	Votes	%	±%
Conservative	Ann Sevier	762	43.8	
Conservative	Ann Bellows	726	41.7	
Liberal Democrats	Tom Cornwall	513	29.5	
Liberal Democrats	Alexandra Sugden	484	27.8	
Green	Timothy Rowe	361	20.7	
Labour	Sarah Sumner	207	11.9	
Labour	Kevin Flack	195	11.2	
Majority		213	12.2	
Turnout		1,741	34.0	
Registered electors		5,242		
Conservative hold				
Conservative hold				

=== Forest North West ===
Seat had been unopposed in 2015 election.

Forest North West (1 seat)
Party	Candidate	Votes	%	±%
Conservative	Emma Lane	445	61.97	
Green	Nicola Jolly	228	31.75	
Labour	Geoffrey Purser	45	6.26	
Majority		216	30.83	
Turnout		718	35.0	
Registered electors		2,110		
Conservative hold				

=== Furzedown & Hardley ===
Furzedown & Hardley (1 seat)
Party	Candidate	Votes	%	±%
Liberal Democrats	Mark Clark	357	46.72	▲12.55
Conservative	Josephine Poole	284	37.17	▲0.12
Labour	Adam Barak	123	16.09	▲16.09
Majority		73	9.55	▲6.67
Turnout		764	29.0	
Registered electors		2,699		
Liberal Democrats gain from Conservative		Swing		

=== Holbury & North Blackfield ===
Holbury & North Blackfield (2 seats)
Party	Candidate	Votes	%	±%
Conservative	Allan Glass	711	63.7	
Conservative	Beverley Thorne	598	53.6	
Labour	Pauline Brown	351	31.5	
Labour	Julie Renyard	334	29.9	
Majority		247	22.1	
Turnout		1,116	23.0	
Registered electors		5,000		
Conservative hold				
Conservative hold				

=== Hordle ===
Hordle (2 seats)
Party	Candidate	Votes	%	±%
Conservative	Frances Carpenter	1,190	72.6	
Conservative	Richard Reid	854	52.1	
UKIP	Paul Bailey	355	21.7	
Labour	Gordon De La Mare	344	21.0	
Majority				
Turnout		1,638	36.0	
Registered electors		4,584		
Conservative hold				
Conservative hold				

=== Hythe West & Langdown ===
Hythe West & Langdown (2 seats)
Party	Candidate	Votes	%	±%
Liberal Democrats	Alexander Wade	1,179	63.5	
Liberal Democrats	Rebecca Clark	1,148	61.8	
Conservative	Teresa Marwood	558	30.0	
Conservative	Claire Terrill	544	29.3	
Majority		590	31.8	
Turnout		1,858	38.0	
Registered electors		5,053		
Liberal Democrats hold				
Liberal Democrats gain from Conservative				

=== Lymington Town ===
Lymington Town (2 seats)
Party	Candidate	Votes	%	±%
Independent	Jacqueline England	1,083	53.2	
Conservative	Barry Dunning	1,057	51.9	
Conservative	Alan Penson	830	40.7	
Labour	Catriona Hart	441	21.6	
Majority				
Turnout		2,037	41.0	
Registered electors		4,983		
Independent gain from Conservative				
Conservative hold				

=== Lyndhurst ===
Lyndhurst (1 seat)
Party	Candidate	Votes	%	±%
Liberal Democrats	Hilary Brand	501	51.22	▲51.22
Conservative	William Andrews	477	48.77	▼11.91
Majority				
Turnout		978	40.0	
Registered electors		2,501		
Liberal Democrats gain from Conservative		Swing		

=== Marchwood ===
Marchwood (2 seats)
Party	Candidate	Votes	%	±%
Conservative	Alison Hoare	785	60.7	
Conservative	Susan Bennison	594	45.9	
Liberal Democrats	John Holden	556	43.0	
Liberal Democrats	Matthew Kitcher	489	37.8	
Majority		38	2.9	
Turnout		1,294		
Registered electors		4,565		
Conservative hold				
Conservative hold				

=== Milford ===
Milford (2 seats)
Party	Candidate	Votes	%	±%
Conservative	Christine Hopkins	1,114	74.0	
Conservative	David Hawkins	1,038	68.9	
Labour	Sally Spicer	395	26.2	
Majority		643	42.7	
Turnout		1,506	37.0	
Registered electors		4,253		
Conservative hold				
Conservative hold				

=== Milton ===
Milton (2 seats)
Party	Candidate	Votes	%	±%
Conservative	Stephen Davies	825	58.3	
Conservative	Stephen Clarke	815	57.6	
Liberal Democrats	Judith Baker	491	34.7	
Labour	Jennie Worsdale	315	22.3	
Majority		324	22.9	
Turnout		1,414	28.0	
Registered electors		5,157		
Conservative hold				
Conservative hold				

=== Pennington ===
Pennington (2 seats)
Party	Candidate	Votes	%	±%
Liberal Democrats	Jack Davies	650	44.8	
Conservative	Andrew Gossage	640	44.1	
Conservative	Michael White	617	42.5	
Liberal Democrats	Colm McCarthy	491	33.8	
Labour	Paul Button	144	9.9	
Labour	Franki Cleeter	126	8.7	
Majority		23	1.6	
Turnout		1,452	30.0	
Registered electors		4,967		
Liberal Democrats gain from Conservative				
Conservative hold				

=== Ringwood East & Sopley ===
Seat had been unopposed in 2015 election.

Ringwood East & Sopley (1 seat)
Party	Candidate	Votes	%	±%
Conservative	Keith Ring	564	75.70	
Labour	Janet Briddick	181	24.29	
Majority		745		
Turnout			33.0	
Registered electors		2,329		
Conservative hold				

=== Ringwood North ===
Ringwood North (2 seats)
Party	Candidate	Votes	%	±%
Conservative	Michael Thierry	797	57.0	
Conservative	Joshua Kidd	767	54.9	
Labour	John Haywood	526	37.6	
Labour	Peter Kelleher	512	36.6	
Majority		241	17.3	
Turnout		1,398	30.0	
Registered electors		4,925		
Conservative hold				
Conservative hold				

=== Ringwood South ===
Ringwood South (2 seats)
Party	Candidate	Votes	%	±%
Conservative	Jeremy Heron	768	57.0	
Conservative	William Rippon-Swaine	765	56.8	
Labour	Linda Turner	505	37.5	
Labour	Paul Iggulden	408	30.3	
Majority		260	19.3	
Turnout		1,348	29.0	
Registered electors		4,911		
Conservative hold				
Conservative hold				

=== Totton Central ===
Totton Central (2 seats)
Party	Candidate	Votes	%	±%
Conservative	Ian Murray	613	53.9	
Conservative	Louise Cerasoli	600	52.7	
Labour	Jayne Laysan	261	22.9	
Independent	Ronald Scrivens	259	22.8	
Labour	Katherine Herbert	236	20.7	
Independent	Frances Orchard	202	17.8	
Majority		339	29.8	
Turnout		1,138	28.0	
Registered electors		4,238		
Conservative hold				
Conservative hold				

=== Totton East ===
Totton East (2 seats)
Party	Candidate	Votes	%	±%
Liberal Democrats	Alexander Brunsdon	669	47.3	
Liberal Democrats	Mahmoud Kangarani	635	44.9	
Conservative	David Penny	538	38.0	
Conservative	Ian Coombes	535	37.8	
Independent	Christopher Lagdon	224	15.8	
Majority		97	6.9	
Turnout		1,414	29.0	
Registered electors		4,931		
Liberal Democrats gain from Conservative				
Liberal Democrats gain from Conservative				

=== Totton North ===
Totton North (2 seats)
Party	Candidate	Votes	%	±%
Conservative	Neville Penman	700	63.0	
Conservative	Arthur Davis	615	55.4	
Liberal Democrats	Jacqueline Shaw	395	35.6	
Liberal Democrats	Benjamin Thompson	322	29.0	
Majority		220	19.8	
Turnout		1,095	24.0	
Registered electors		4,774		
Conservative hold				
Conservative hold				

=== Totton South ===
Totton South (2 seats)
Party	Candidate	Votes	%	±%
Liberal Democrats	David Harrison	993	73.1	
Liberal Democrats	Caroline Rackham	735	54.1	
Conservative	Leonard Harris	411	30.2	
Conservative	Kate Lord	358	26.3	
Majority		324	23.9	
Turnout		1,359	30.0	
Registered electors		4,586		
Liberal Democrats hold				
Liberal Democrats gain from Conservative				

=== Totton West ===
Totton West (2 seats)
Party	Candidate	Votes	%	±%
Conservative	Kathleen Crisell	599	66.2	
Conservative	David Russell	545	60.2	
Labour	Helen Field	289	31.9	
Labour	Jhn Rochey-Adams	242	26.7	
Majority		256	28.3	
Turnout		905	25.0	
Registered electors		3,761		
Conservative hold				
Conservative hold				

== By-elections since 2019 ==
Hythe West and Langdown by-election, 10th March 2022
Party	Candidate	Votes	%	±%
Liberal Democrats	Sean Cullen	559	44.6	▼17.2
Conservative	Terri Marwood	497	39.7	▲9.7
Labour	James Gallagher	153	12.2	New
Independent	Matthew Kitcher	44	3.5	New
Majority		158	11.3	N/A
Turnout		1,253	31.1	▼1.9
Liberal Democrats hold				

Bransgore & Burley by-election, 23rd December 2021
Party	Candidate	Votes	%	±%
Independent	Richard Frampton	617	44.3	New
Green	Lucy Bramley	459	33.0	New
Conservative	Sarah Howard	258	18.5	▼53.7
Labour	James Swyer	59	4.2	▼23.5
Majority		62	4.95	N/A
Turnout		1,393	31.1	▼1.9
Independent gain from Conservative		Swing	▲49.0	
