= Alex Bell (footballer, born 1931) =

Scottish footballer

Personal information
- Full name: Alexander Stewart Bell
- Date of birth: 13 March 1931 (age 95)
- Place of birth: Auchinleck, Scotland
- Height: 6 ft 0 in (1.83 m)
- Position: Goalkeeper

Youth career
- 1949–1951: Glenafton Athletic

Senior career*
Years	Team	Apps	(Gls)
1951–1954	Partick Thistle	12	(0)
1954–1958	Exeter City	40	(0)
1958–1959	Grimsby Town	8	(0)
Total		60	(0)
- * Club domestic league appearances and goals

Alexander Stewart Bell (born 13 March 1931) is a Scottish former professional footballer, who played as a goalkeeper.
