= Robert Dinsdale =

Historical fiction and fantasy author

- Born: Robert Neil Dinsdale; April 1981 (age 45); Northallerton, England
- Education: University of Leeds
- Years active: 2009–present
- Children: 1
- Website: www.robertdinsdale.com

Robert Neil Dinsdale (born April 1981) is an English author of historical fiction and fantasy. His novels include The Harrowing (2009), Little Exiles (2013), The Toymakers (2018) and Once a Monster (2023).

== Early life ==
Dinsdale was born in Northallerton, North Yorkshire and grew up near Target Wood. He began writing at a young age and received his first rejection letter at age 12. He graduated from the University of Leeds.

== Career ==
Dinsdale published his debut novel The Harrowing via Faber & Faber in 2009. The novel follows two working-class brothers from Leeds, one of whom takes the other's place in the First World War. The Harrowing was longlisted for the Waverton Good Read Award. Dinsdale reunited with Faber & Faber for the publication of his second novel Three Miles, set in Leeds during the Blitz.

In 2012, Dinsdale signed a two-book deal with HarperCollins UK and Australia, through which he published Little Exiles, centred around the exile of child orphans to Australia in the after math of World War II. This was followed by Dinsdale's first fantasy novel Gingerbread, set in Belarus and drawing upon Slavic folklore, in 2014.

As announced in 2017, Dinsdale's next novel The Toymakers (also stylised as The Toy Makers) was published via Del Rey (an Ebury Publishing imprint) in February 2018. The story begins in 1906 when teen mother Cathy Wray is hired by Papa Jack's Emporium and follows the various characters through the decades. The Toymakers named a Historical Novel Society Editors' Choice and longlisted for a 2020 Dublin Literary Award Also under Del Rey, Dinsdale's sixth Paris by Starlight was published in 2020.

Dinsdale moved to Pan Macmillan for the publication of Once a Monster in 2023, a reimagining of the Minotaur myth set in Victorian London. Once a Monster was also named a Historical Novel Society Editors' Choice.

== Personal life ==
Dinsdale lives in Leigh-on-Sea and has a daughter.

== Bibliography ==
- The Harrowing (2009)
- Three Miles (2011)
- Little Exiles (2013)
- Gingerbread (2014)
- The Toymakers (2018) (also known as The Toy Makers)
- Paris by Starlight (2020)
- Once a Monster (2023)
