= New Forest District =

Coordinates: 50.879°N 1.633°W

New Forest
- Non-metropolitan district
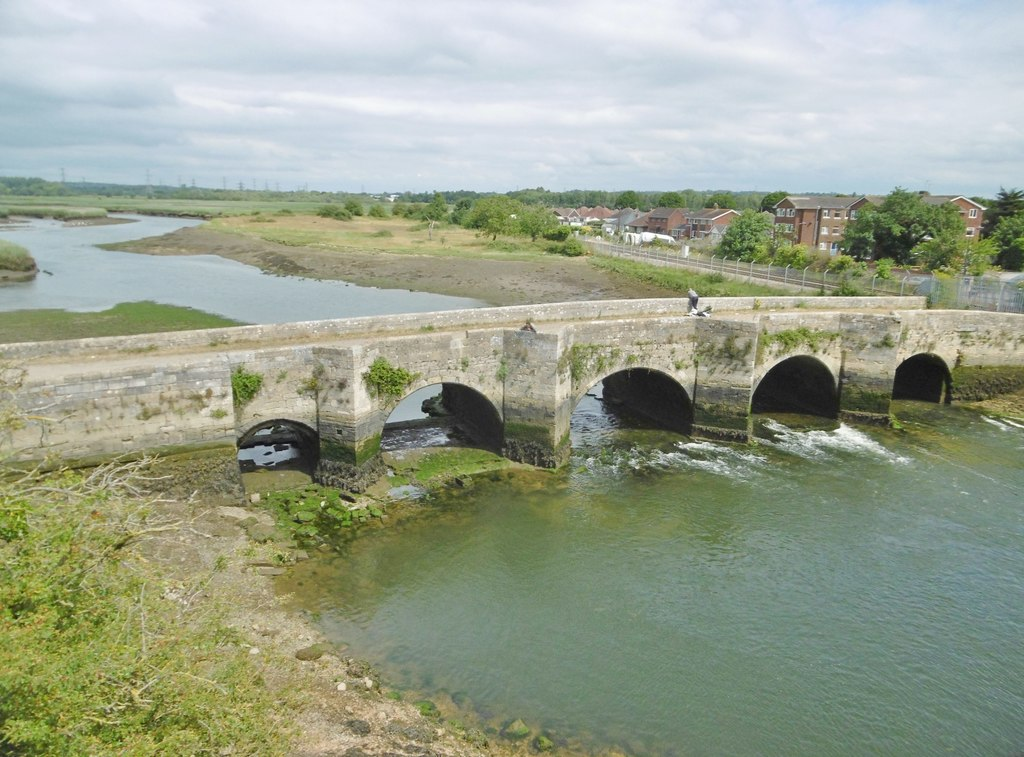
- The Redbridge Bridge in Totton
- Motto: "Old yet ever new"
- New Forest shown within Hampshire
- Sovereign state: United Kingdom
- Constituent country: England
- Region: South East England
- Non-metropolitan county: Hampshire
- Status: Non-metropolitan district
- Admin HQ: Lyndhurst
- Incorporated: 1 April 1974

Government
  - Type: Non-metropolitan district council
  - Body: New Forest District Council
  - MPs: Julian Lewis; Desmond Swayne

Area
  - Total: 290.8 sq mi (753.2 km^{2})
  - Rank: 43rd (of 296)

Population (2025)
  - Total: 175,930
  - Rank: 120th (of 296)
  - Density: 605.0/sq mi (233.6/km^{2})

Ethnicity (2021)
  - Ethnic groups: List: 96.8% White; 1.3% Mixed; 1.2% Asian; 0.4% Black; 0.4% other

Religion (2021)
  - Religion: List: 51.1% Christianity; 40.9% no religion; 6.1% not stated; 0.6% Islam; 0.5% other; 0.3% Buddhism; 0.3% Hinduism; 0.2% Judaism; 0.1% Sikhism
- Time zone: UTC0 (GMT)
  - Summer (DST): UTC+1 (BST)
- ONS code: 24UJ (ONS); E07000091 (GSS)
- OS grid reference: SU2581608959

New Forest is a local government district in Hampshire, England. Its council is based in Lyndhurst, although the largest town is Totton. The district also includes the towns of Fordingbridge, Lymington, New Milton and Ringwood. The district is named after and covers most of the New Forest National Park, which occupies much of the central part of the district. The main urban areas are around the periphery of the forest. The district has a coastline onto the Solent to the south and Southampton Water to the east.

The neighbouring districts are Bournemouth, Christchurch and Poole, Dorset, Wiltshire, Test Valley, Southampton and Eastleigh (across Southampton Water). The district also faces the Isle of Wight across the Solent.

== History ==
The district was created on 1 April 1974 under the Local Government Act 1972, covering the whole area of two former districts and most of a third, which were all abolished at the same time:

- Lymington Municipal Borough
- New Forest Rural District
- Ringwood and Fordingbridge Rural District (except the parishes of Burton and Hurn, which went to Christchurch, and the parish of St Leonards and St Ives, which went to Wimborne)

The new district was named New Forest after the forest which covers much of the area.

New Forest is one of the most populous districts in England not to be a unitary authority; at the 2021 census only four non-unitary districts had more people. The Banham Commission had recommended that New Forest should become a unitary authority in 1995, but this was rejected by the government.

In March 2026, the government announced that it would abolish the district in 2028 as part of local government reform across Hampshire. These proposals were withdrawn in September 2026.

== Governance ==
New Forest District Council

Type
- Type: Non-metropolitan district

Leadership
- Chair: Dave Penny, Conservative since 18 May 2026
- Leader: Jill Cleary, Conservative since 14 November 2022
- Chief Executive: Kate Ryan since December 2021

Structure
- Seats: 48 councillors
- Political groups: Administration (25) Conservative (25) Other parties (23) Liberal Democrats (14) Green (2) Reform (2) Labour (1) Independent (4)
- Length of term: 4 years

Elections
- Last election: 4 May 2023
- Next election: 6 May 2027

Meeting place
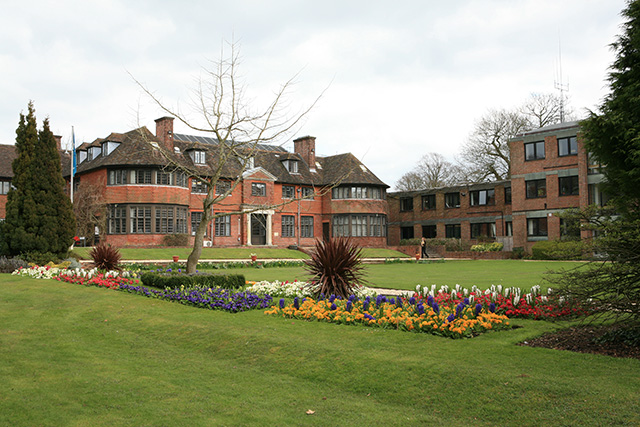
- Appletree Court, Beaulieu Road, Lyndhurst, SO43 7PA

Website
- www.newforest.gov.uk

New Forest District Council provides district-level services. County-level services are provided by Hampshire County Council. The whole district is also covered by civil parishes, which form a third tier of local government.

In the parts of the district within the New Forest National Park, town planning is the responsibility of the New Forest National Park Authority. The district council appoints four of its councillors to serve on the 22-person National Park Authority.

=== Political control ===
The council has been under no overall control since March 2026, when the Conservatives lost their majority when a councillor defected to Reform UK. The Conservatives continue to run the council as a minority administration.

The first election to the council was held in 1973, initially acting as a shadow authority alongside the outgoing authorities until the new arrangements took effect on 1 April 1974. Political control since 1974 has been as follows:

| Party in control | Years |
|---|---|
| Independent | 1974–1976 |
| Conservative | 1976–1991 |
| No overall control | 1991–1995 |
| Liberal Democrats | 1995–1999 |
| Conservative | 1999–2026 |
| No overall control | 2026–2026 |
| Conservative | 2026–Present |

=== Leadership ===
The leaders of the council since 1990 (formally the chair of the policy and resources committee prior to 2001) have been:

| Councillor | Party | From | To |
|---|---|---|---|
| Jack Webb | Conservative | pre-1990 | May 1991 |
| Jack Maynard | Liberal Democrats | 20 May 1991 | May 1993 |
| John Coles | Liberal Democrats | 24 May 1993 | May 1999 |
| Simon Hayes | Conservative | 24 May 1999 | 18 Nov 2002 |
| Mel Kendal | Conservative | 18 Nov 2002 | 31 Oct 2008 |
| Barry Rickman | Conservative | 1 Nov 2008 | 22 Mar 2021 |
| Edward Heron | Conservative | 12 Apr 2021 | 14 Nov 2022 |
| Jill Cleary | Conservative | 14 Nov 2022 | |

=== Composition ===
Following the 2023 election, and subsequent by-elections and changes of allegiance up to June 2026, the composition of the council was:

| Party | Seats |
|---|---|
| Conservative | 24 |
| Liberal Democrats | 14 |
| Green | 2 |
| Reform | 2 |
| Labour | 1 |
| Independent | 5 |
| Total | 48 |

Four of the five independent councillors sit together as a group.

=== Elections ===
Since the last boundary changes in 2023 the council has comprised 48 councillors representing 26 wards, with each ward electing one, two or three councillors. Elections are held every four years.

The district is divided between two parliamentary constituencies: New Forest East and New Forest West.

=== Premises ===
The council is based at Appletree Court on Beaulieu Road in Lyndhurst. The oldest part of the building was originally a large house, which was purchased in 1954 to become the offices of the New Forest Rural District Council. The building has been substantially extended since becoming council offices.

== Towns and parishes ==
The whole district is covered by civil parishes. The parish councils for Fordingbridge, Lymington and Pennington, New Milton, Ringwood, and Totton and Eling have declared their parishes to be towns, allowing them to take the style "town council". Whilst Brockenhurst and Lyndhurst are both post towns they have parish councils rather than town councils. The parishes are:

- Ashurst and Colbury
- Beaulieu
- Boldre
- Bramshaw
- Bransgore
- Breamore
- Brockenhurst
- Burley
- Copythorne
- Damerham
- Denny Lodge
- East Boldre
- Ellingham, Harbridge and Ibsley
- Exbury and Lepe
- Fawley
- Fordingbridge
- Godshill
- Hale
- Hordle
- Hyde
- Hythe and Dibden
- Lymington and Pennington
- Lyndhurst
- Marchwood
- Martin
- Milford-on-Sea
- Minstead
- Netley Marsh
- New Milton
- Plaitford
- Ringwood
- Rockbourne
- Sandleheath
- Sopley
- Sway
- Totton and Eling
- Whitsbury
- Woodgreen
