= Fawley railway station =

Railway station in Fawley, England

Fawley
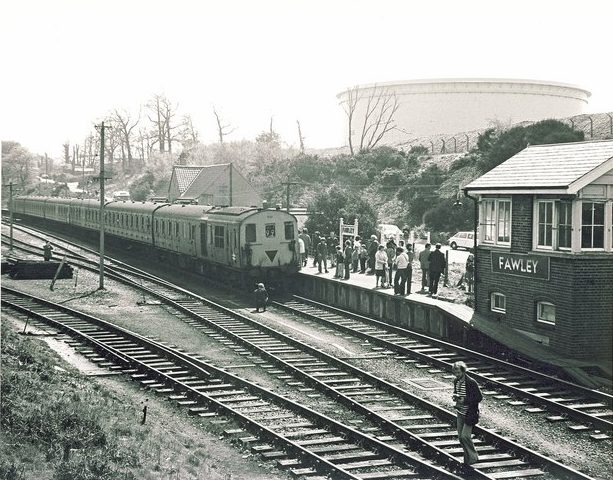
- Private charter train at Fawley, 23 April 1978

General information
- Location: Fawley, New Forest; England
- Coordinates: 50.83504°N 1.35387°W
- Platforms: 1

Other information
- Status: Disused

History
- Original company: Totton, Hythe and Fawley Light Railway
- Post-grouping: Southern Railway; Southern Region of British Railways

Key dates
- 20 July 1925: Opened
- 14 February 1966: Closed (passenger)
- 2 January 1967: Closed (general goods) but remained open for oil traffic
- 1 September 2016: Closed (oil)
Location

Fawley railway station was the terminus of the Totton, Hythe and Fawley Light Railway, which was built along the coast of Southampton Water to connect Totton and Fawley and to provide a freight link from the South West Main Line to Fawley Refinery.

== History ==
The station opened on 20 July 1925 and closed to passengers on 14 February 1966 and goods on 2 January 1967.

== Present situation ==
In June 2009 the Association of Train Operating Companies published a report (Connecting Communities: Expanding Access to the Rail Network) strongly indicating that the reopening of Hythe station, to serve the village of Hythe, north of Fawley, would be viable, in that the ratio of business, economic and social benefits to costs would be as high as 4.8. However the ATOC report did not suggest any passenger service for Fawley, or anywhere south of Hythe.

The last train serving the refinery ran on 1 September 2016, after which trains would run only as far as Marchwood.

== Proposed reopening ==
In August 2018, it was revealed that plans to reopen the Fawley Branch Line had been resurrected as part of the redevelopment known as Fawley Waters. It proposed a half-hourly service on a Monday to Saturday from Southampton Central to Fawley. At Marchwood the journey time would take 12 minutes and the linespeed would be 60 mph (97 km/h). Fawley station, if reopened, would be known as Hythe & Fawley Parkway which would serve both Hythe and Fawley. The line has been identified as a priority for reopening to passenger use by Campaign for Better Transport.

== Route ==
Preceding station	Historical railways	Following station
Hardley Halt	Southern Region of British Railways; Fawley Branch Line	Terminus
