= Hythe railway station (Hampshire) =

Railway station in Hythe, England

Hythe (Hants)
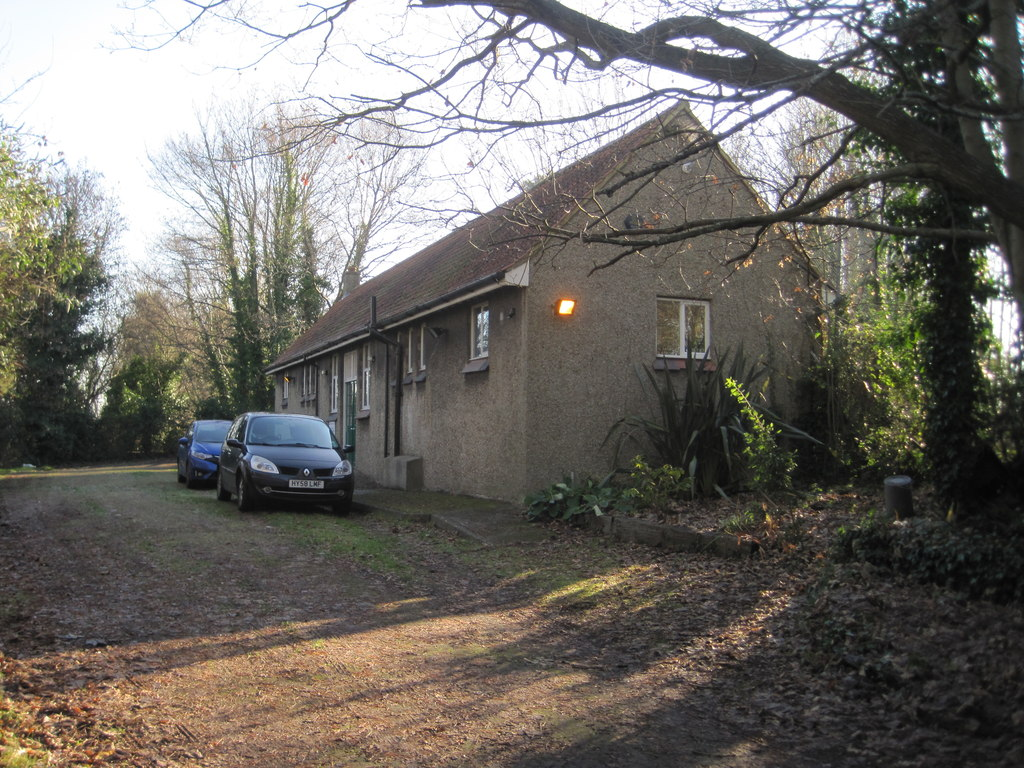
- The site of the station in 2017

General information
- Location: Hythe, New Forest; England
- Coordinates: 50.8661°N 1.3955°W
- Platforms: 1

Other information
- Status: Disused

History
- Original company: Totton, Hythe and Fawley Light Railway
- Post-grouping: Southern Railway; Southern Region of British Railways

Key dates
- 20 July 1925: Opened
- 14 February 1966: Closed to passengers
- 2 January 1967: Closed to goods
- 1 September 2016: Line closed
Location

Hythe (Hants) railway station in Hampshire was an intermediate station on the Totton, Hythe and Fawley Light Railway, which was built along the coast of Southampton Water to connect Totton and Fawley and to provide a freight link from the South West Main Line to Fawley Refinery.

== History ==
The station opened on 20 July 1925 and closed to passengers on 14 February 1966 and goods on 2 January 1967. The single-track non-electrified line through Hythe closed after the last train on 1 September 2016.

== Reopening ==
In June 2009 the Association of Train Operating Companies published a report (Connecting Communities: Expanding Access to the Rail Network) strongly indicating that the reopening of Hythe railway station would be viable, in that the ratio of business, economic and social benefits to costs would be as high as 4.8. The ATOC report gave the indicative capital cost of reopening as £3 million. ATOC's evaluation was based on a diesel service, but it recommended that electrification of the seven miles from Hythe to Totton should also be evaluated, on the basis that some services now terminating at Southampton could be extended to Hythe.

In January 2014, Hampshire County Council shelved the plans due to the business case "offering poor value for money". The scheme could however be revisited in the future if local circumstances change.

Following the withdrawal of the oil trains from Fawley in August 2016, Waterside Community Railway group held a supporters meeting at Hythe Community Centre on 17 October 2016·to discuss current plans to re-open the branch line for passenger services. The line has been identified as a priority for reopening to passenger use by Campaign for Better Transport. A series of public consultations was held between Monday 8 August and Friday 9 September 2022 to hear views on reintroducing passenger services to the Waterside Line.

== Route ==
Preceding station	Historical railways	Following station
Marchwood	Southern Region of British Railways; Fawley Branch Line	Hardley Halt
