= Marchwood railway station =

Railway station in Marchwood, England

Marchwood
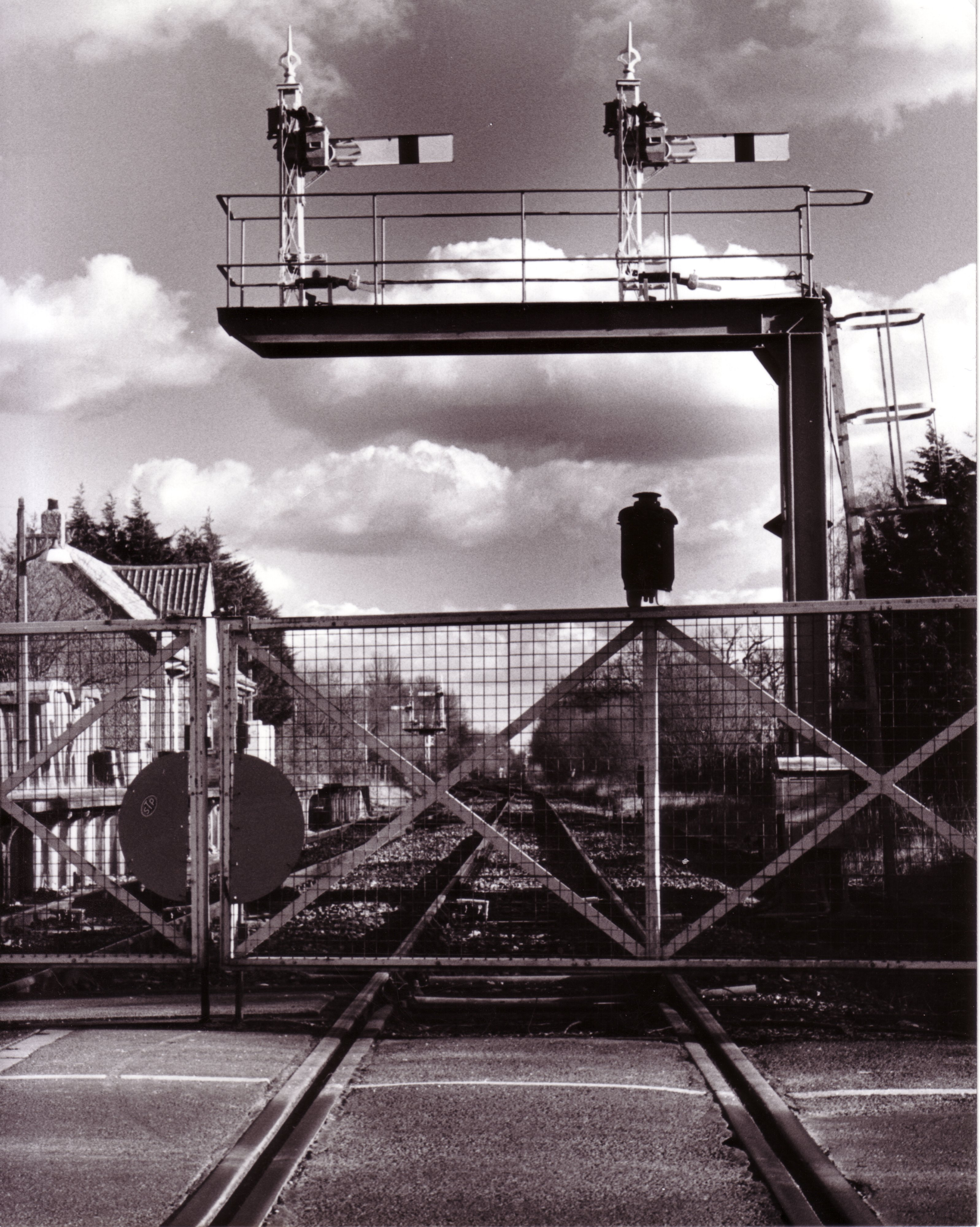
- Marchwood railway station and level crossing gates, c.1996

General information
- Location: Marchwood, New Forest; England
- Coordinates: 50.8888°N 1.4550°W
- Platforms: 1

Other information
- Status: Disused

History
- Original company: Totton, Hythe and Fawley Light Railway
- Post-grouping: Southern Railway; Southern Region of British Railways

Key dates
- 20 July 1925: Opened
- 14 February 1966: Closed to passenger traffic
Location

Marchwood railway station was an intermediate station on the Totton, Hythe and Fawley Light Railway, which was built along the coast of Southampton Water to connect Totton and Fawley and to provide a freight link from the South West Main Line to Fawley Refinery. It was 86 miles 10 chains (86.13 miles, 138.60 km) measured from London Waterloo.

== History ==
The station opened on 20 July 1925 and closed to passengers on 14 February 1966. The single-track non-electrified line remains open to serve Marchwood MOD sidings but freight services to Fawley refinery ceased in April 2016

== Future ==
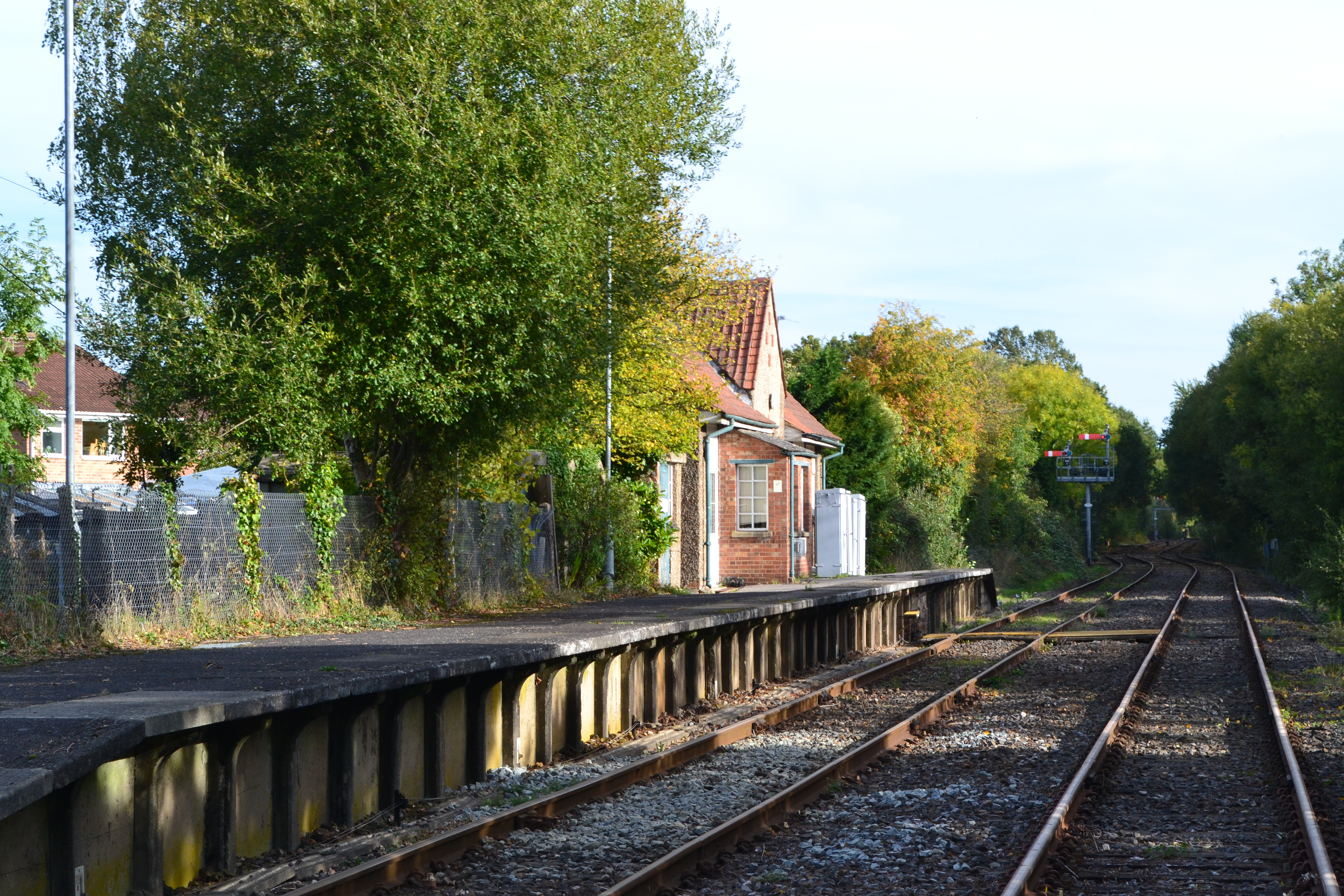
Marchwood railway station, October 2018

There has been intermittent discussion of reopening part of the Fawley branch line for passenger traffic. In June 2009 the Association of Train Operating Companies published a report (Connecting Communities: Expanding Access to the Rail Network) strongly indicating that the reopening of the next station in the Fawley direction, Hythe, would be viable, in that the ratio of business, economic and social benefits to costs would be as high as 4.8. The possibility of reopening Marchwood station was not mentioned in ATOC's proposal. Further studies for Hampshire County Council led to a 2014 decision not to devote further resources to reopening of the line, but planned future housing growth in the Waterside area, including 1,500 announced in 2017 on the site of the former Fawley Power Station has again reopened interest in the proposal. The line has been identified as a priority for reopening to passenger use by Campaign for Better Transport.

On 28 July 2020, South Western Railway ran a 'fact-finding train' down the branch line, stopping at Marchwood, to demonstrate the branch line's potential. This service carried the station's first passengers in 54 years.

A series of public consultations will be held between Monday 8 August and Friday 9 September 2022 to hear views on reintroducing passenger services to the Waterside Line.

== Route ==
Preceding station	Historical railways	Following station
Totton	Southern Railway; Fawley Branch Line	Hythe (Hampshire)

== Trivia ==
Marchwood station was the set for two episodes of the British television series The Famous Five in 1978, the station was renamed Kirrin during filming.
