= List of Beeching cuts service reopenings =

The Beeching cuts were a reduction in the size of the British railway network, along with a restructuring of British Rail, in the 1960s. Since the mid-1990s there has been significant growth in passenger numbers on the railways and renewed government interest in the role of rail in UK transport. Some closed stations have reopened, and rail passenger services have been restored on a few lines where they had been withdrawn.

Some former British Rail lines have become heritage railways: for example, the Bluebell Railway in Sussex, which reopened in stages from 1960.

== Completed reopenings ==
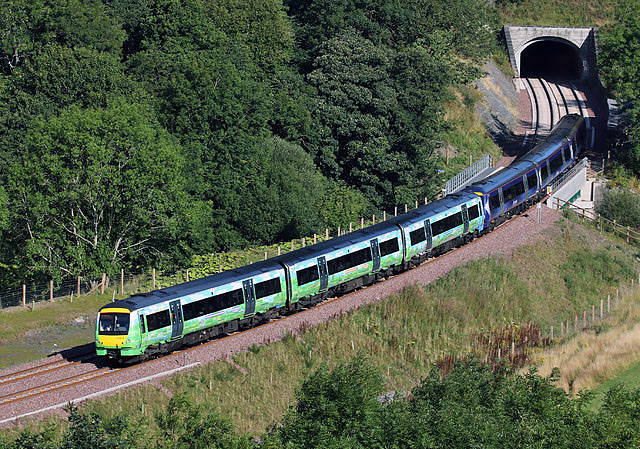
The reopened Borders Railway in Scotland

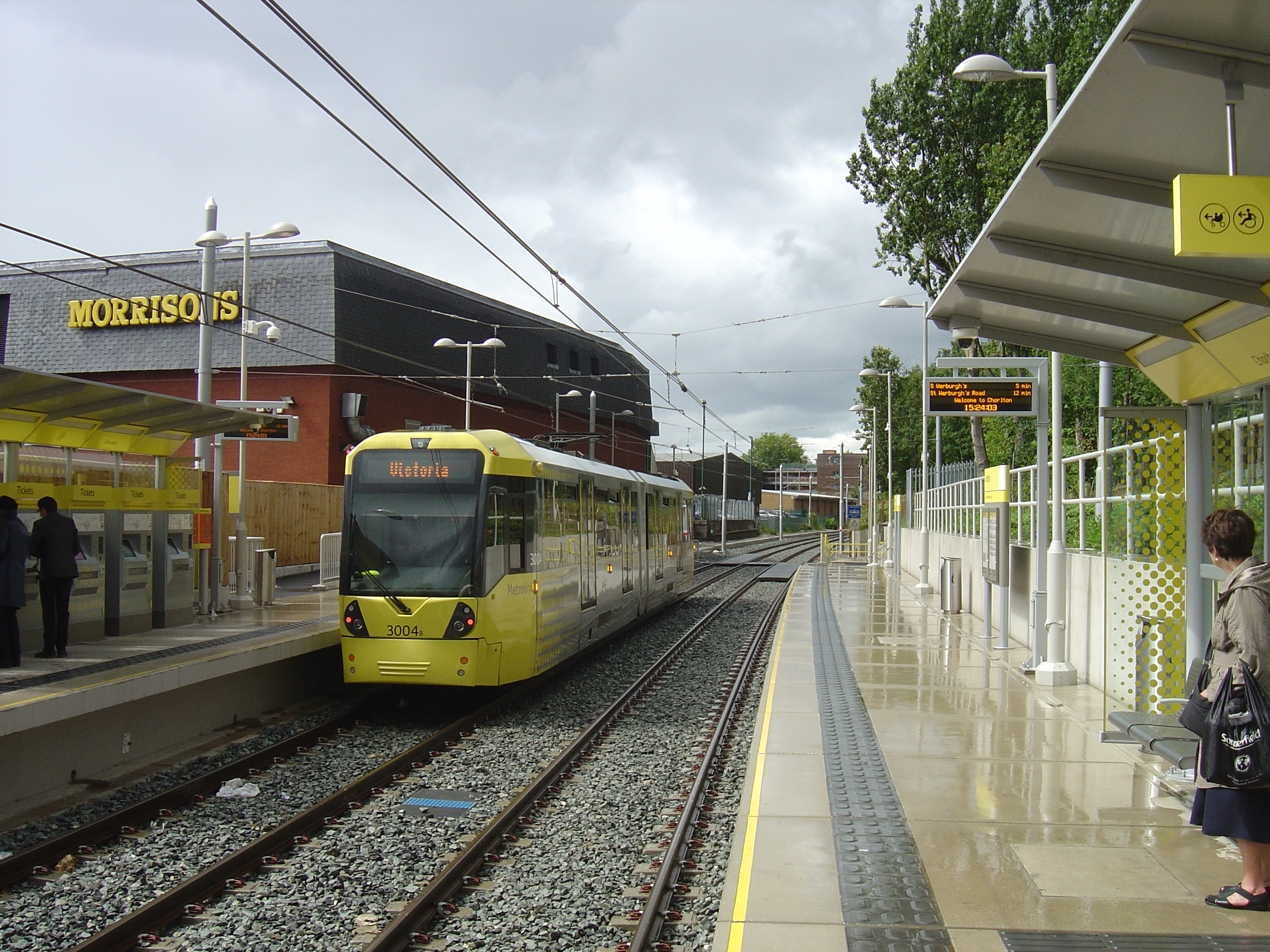
Closed lines now converted to light rail operation for Manchester Metrolink

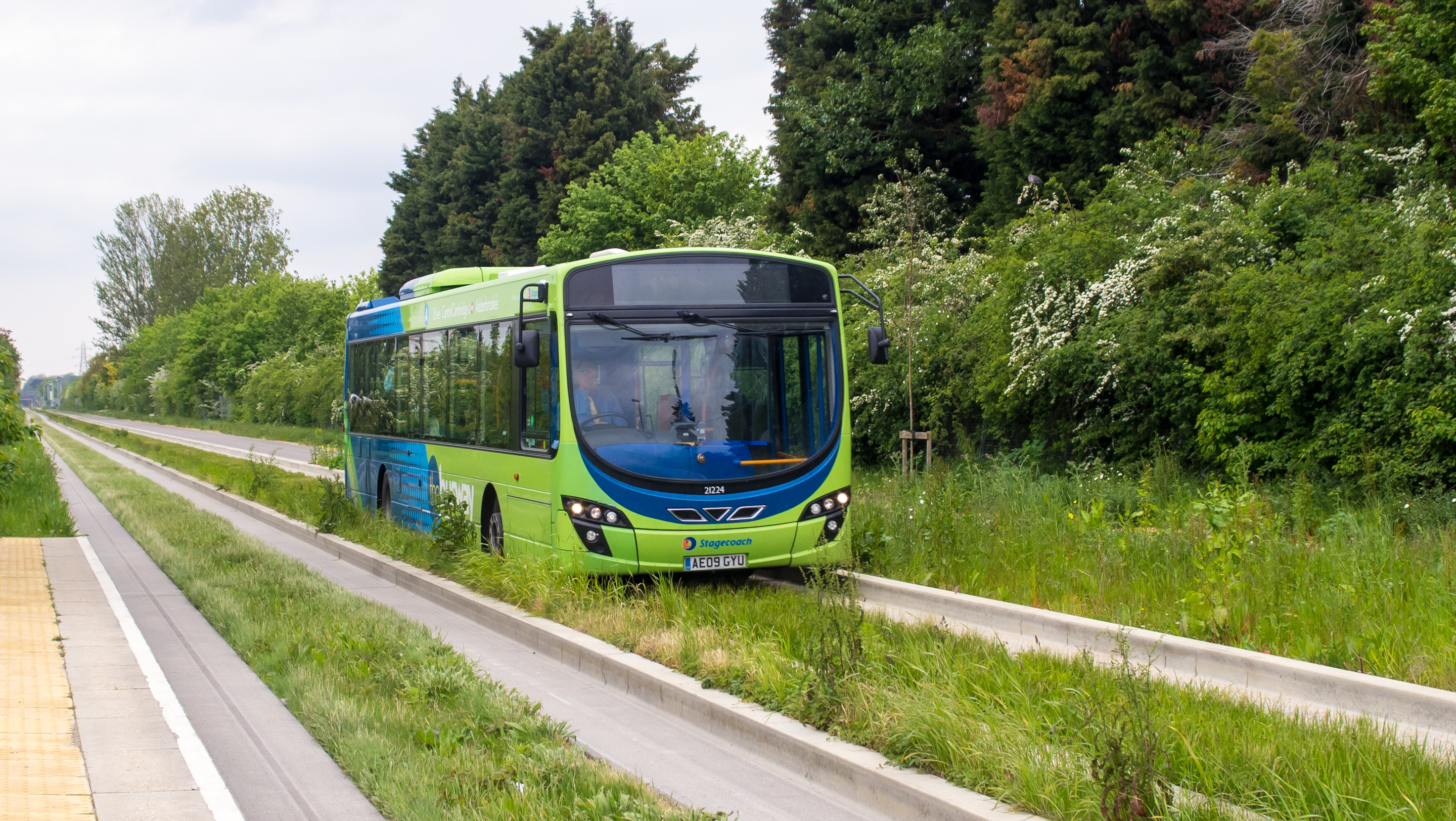
Closed line converted into a guided busway – the Cambridgeshire Guided Busway

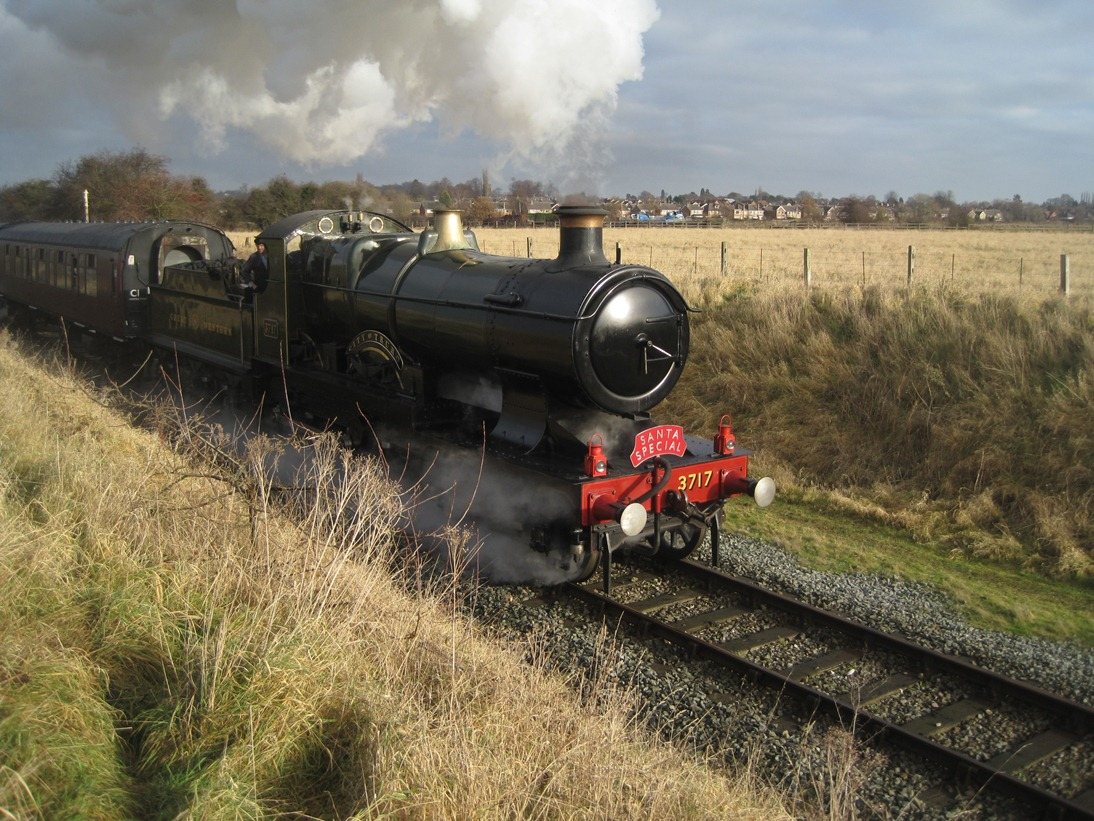
Closed line converted to a heritage railway at Great Central Railway (Nottingham)

=== London ===
- Snow Hill tunnel, south of Farringdon station, completely closed in the 1960s, was reopened for passengers in 1988 as part of Thameslink, providing a link between the Midland Main Line and the former Southern Railway via London Blackfriars station.

=== South East ===
- The Chiltern Main Line was redoubled in two stages between 1998 and 2002, between Princes Risborough and Aynho Junction.
- The Romsey to Eastleigh link, closed to regular passenger services in 1969, reopened in 2003 along with the intermediate station at Chandler's Ford in Hampshire.
- Services on the London–Aylesbury line were extended north along the former Great Central Main Line (closed in 1966) to a new station called Aylesbury Vale Parkway, which opened in December 2008.
- The line from Oxford to Bicester reopened in 1987 after closing in 1968. As part of the East West Rail project, passenger services are to be restored to the section of line from Bicester to Bletchley.

=== South West ===
- Stations reopened include Ashley Hill closed in 1964 was reopened in 2024 as Ashley Down, Ashchurch, Cam and Dursley, Feniton, Pinhoe, Templecombe and Yate.
- Service between Swindon and Trowbridge ceased in 1966 but two passenger trains each way were reinstated in 1985, along with the reopening of Melksham station. Passenger numbers rose rapidly, and the service – now increased in frequency and known as the TransWilts Line – was extended to Westbury.
- Regular passenger services between Yeovil Junction and Yeovil Pen Mill were withdrawn in 1968; a limited service was reinstated in 2015.
- The passenger service between Exeter and Okehampton was originally withdrawn in 1972. A Summer Sunday service ran from 1997 to 2019, with a full daily service reinstated in 2021.

=== East Anglia/Lincolnshire ===
- Needham Market, closed in 1967, was reopened in 1971; Soham, closed in 1965 was reopened in 2021; and Magdalen Road closed in 1968 and was reopened as Watlington in 1975.
- Peterborough–Lincoln line: the section between Peterborough and Spalding closed to passengers on 5 October 1970 and reopened on 7 June 1971.

=== East Midlands ===
- The Robin Hood Line in Nottinghamshire, between Nottingham and Worksop via Mansfield, reopened in the early 1990s. Since closure in 1964 Mansfield had been the largest town in Britain without a rail link.
- Stations at Syston, Sileby and Barrow-upon-Soar between Leicester and Loughborough closed in 1968 reopened in 1994.
- The Kettering to Manton Jn Line via Corby closed to passengers on 18 April 1966. A shuttle service between Kettering and Corby was introduced in 1987, but the service was unreliable and lost funding support from the local council, leading to its closure in 1990. The line was then reopened on 23 February 2009 with Corby served by direct trains to London and a limited number of trains continuing on towards Oakham and Melton Mowbray.
- Alfreton, Langley Mill and Ilkeston stations on the Erewash Valley line closed in 1967 have since been reopened.
- Dronfield (closed 1967 reopened 1981), Matlock Bath was closed in 1967 and reopened in 1972, Narborough was closed in 1968 but reopened two years later, Peartree was closed in 1968 and reopened 1976, Tutbury and Hatton was closed in 1966 and reopened in 1989, Willington was closed in 1968 and reopened in 1994, Wigston Glen Parva was closed in 1968 and replaced with a new station South Wigston in 1986 on an adjacent site.

=== West Midlands ===
- Birmingham Snow Hill station, after closing in 1972, was rebuilt and reopened in 1987 along with Snow Hill tunnel underneath Birmingham city centre to Birmingham Moor Street. The section of the Birmingham to Worcester via Kidderminster line between Snow Hill to Smethwick was reopened in 1995.
- The line from Snow Hill to Wolverhampton mainly reopened as the West Midlands Metro tram system.
- The line from Coventry to Nuneaton reopened to passengers in 1988, along with Bedworth station.
- The Coventry–Leamington line reopened to passengers in 1977, and the station at Kenilworth reopened on 30 April 2018.
- The passenger service between Lichfield City and Lichfield Trent Valley, withdrawn in 1965, was reinstated in 1988.
- The Walsall–Hednesford line reopened to passengers in 1989, and was extended to Rugeley Town in 1997 and Rugeley Trent Valley in 1998.
- Passenger services were reinstated between Walsall and Wolverhampton, but withdrawn in 2008 on cost and efficiency grounds. Stations at Darlaston and Willenhall were reopened in March 2026. These stations are currently served by Birmingham New Street to Shrewsbury services only, with direct services between Walsall and Wolverhampton currently being planned.
- The Cotswold Line has been redoubled in places, and Honeybourne station reopened.
- Coleshill, closed in 1968, was rebuilt and reopened in 2007.

=== North East/Yorkshire ===
- On the lines from Leeds/Bradford to Skipton the following stations, closed in 1965, have been reopened (or replaced with stations on adjacent sites): Apperley Bridge, Cononley, Frizinghall, Saltaire and Steeton and Silsden.
- The line from Wakefield Kirkgate to Pontefract Monkhill, closed in 1967, was reopened in 1992 with Pontefract Tanshelf and two new stations.
- Adwick, Fitzwilliam and Swinton (South Yorkshire) were originally closed in 1967 but new stations were opened on adjacent sites. Horden, closed in 1964, was reopened in 2020 on a different site.
- Passenger service from Bradford to Huddersfield, withdrawn in 1970, was reinstated in 2000 with reopening of Brighouse station. From 2017, trains also served Low Moor which was originally closed in 1965.
- Other stations reopened are Slaithwaite (closed 1968, reopened 1982), Bramley (West Yorkshire) (closed 1966, reopened 1983) and Sherburn-in-Elmet (closed 1965, reopened 1984)
- Line from Sunderland to South Hylton, closed in 1964, was rebuilt and reopened in 2002 as part of the Tyne and Wear Metro.
- Passenger service from Castleford to York, withdrawn in 1970, was reinstated from December 2023.
- Passenger service from Newcastle to Ashington, withdrawn in 1964, was reinstated in December 2024.

=== North West ===
- The Merseyrail line from Liverpool Central to Hunts Cross was closed in 1972 and mainly reopened in 1978.
- Wetheral, closed in 1967, was reopened in 1981; and Lostock, closed in 1966, was rebuilt in 1988. Balshaw Lane and Euxton was closed in 1969 but was rebuilt and reopened as Euxton Balshaw Lane in 1997. Lostock Hall, closed in 1969, was rebuilt on an adjacent site in 1984.
- The route out of Manchester Central over the Cheshire Lines Committee's Manchester South District Line has been reopened by Metrolink. The line opened to St Werburgh's Road (via Chorlton) in July 2011 and was extended as far as East Didsbury in May 2013.
- On the Settle and Carlisle line, most of the intermediate stations were closed in 1970 but regular passenger services were restored in 1986 to the following stations: Horton-in-Ribblesdale, Ribblehead, Dent, Garsdale, Kirkby Stephen, Langwathby, Lazonby and Kirkoswald and Armathwaite.

=== North and Mid Wales ===
- Glan Conwy, closed in 1964, reopened in 1970; and Dolgarrog closed in 1964 but reopened the following year.
- On the North Wales Coast Line the following stations closed in 1966 have been reopened: Shotton Low Level, Conwy, Llanfairpwll and Valley
- Bow Street, closed in 1965, was reopened on an adjacent site in 2021.

=== South Wales ===
- 32 new stations and four lines reopened within 20 miles (32 km) of each other: Abercynon–Aberdare, Barry–Bridgend via Llantwit Major, Bridgend–Maesteg and the Ebbw Valley Railway via Newbridge.
- Stopping trains between Cardiff and Swansea, withdrawn in 1964, were re-introduced in 1992 serving reopened stations at Pontyclun, Llanharan (opened 2007), Pencoed, Pyle, Baglan, Briton Ferry, Skewen and Llansamlet.
- Penally closed in 1964 and reopened in 1972, Sugar Loaf closed in 1965 and reopened in 1984 and Fishguard and Goodwick, which closed for regular passenger services in 1964, reopened in 2012.

=== Scotland ===
- Glasgow Central Railway between Rutherglen and Stobcross was reopened in November 1979, establishing the Argyle Line connecting the Hamilton Circle to the North Clyde Line. Intermediate stations at Dalmarnock, Bridgeton, Glasgow Central Low Level and Anderston were reopened, and a new station opened at Argyle Street.
- The Maryhill Line in Glasgow re-opened to stopping trains in 1993, which had ceased in the 1960s. It is a suburban railway line linking central Glasgow (Queen Street station) and Anniesland via Maryhill.
- The Argyle Line was extended in December 2005 when a four-mile (6.4 km) section of the Mid Lanark Lines of the Caledonian Railway reopened, serving Chatelherault, Merryton and Larkhall.
- The Glasgow and South Western Railway's Paisley Canal line was closed to passengers in 1983. The majority of the route reopened in 1990.
- The Caledonian Railway's Rutherglen and Coatbridge Railway closed to passengers in 1964. The majority of the route was reopened (with a revised terminus station at Whifflet) in 1993.
- Stirling to Alloa reopened on 19 May 2008, providing a passenger service to Alloa on the route of the former Stirling-Dunfermline main line after a 40-year gap. This line had not been marked for closure by Beeching. The restored line also provides for freight onwards to Kincardine, and ultimately to Dunfermline by the slower, single track coastal route. Coal traffic ceased in 2016 on the closure of Longannet power station.
- Other stations closed in the mid-1960s now re-opened, on lines which remained open, include Ardrossan Town, Auchinleck, Duncraig, Dunlop, Dunrobin Castle, Dyce, Gretna Green, Kilmaurs, Kingsknowe, Laurencekirk, Loch Awe, New Cumnock, and Stewarton. Some stations have reopened on adjacent sites Bridge of Allan, Camelon, East Linton, Kintore and Reston.
- A 35-mile (56 km) stretch of the former Waverley Route between Edinburgh and Tweedbank via Galashiels reopened on 6 September 2015. The closure of the line in 1969 had left the Scottish Borders without any rail links.
- The passenger service between Cardenden and Thornton Junction withdrawn in 1969 was reinstated in 1989 as part of a new Fife Circle train service.
- The Levenmouth rail link in Fife, closed to passengers in 1969, was reopened in 2024.

== Further proposals ==
In November 2017 the government announced plans to reverse some of the cuts made in the 1960s, and later cuts by British Rail, to restore lost capacity and introduce new routes to help with new housing or relieve congestion.

In 2022, proposals being pursued included:

- East West Rail, restoring passenger services between Bicester and Milton Keynes, expected to reopen in 2026. Future plans are to build a new railway between Bedford and Cambridge using part of the original alignment closed in 1968 and reopening of the line between Aylesbury Vale Parkway and Claydon Junction.
- Passenger service on the Portishead Railway stopped in 1964; plans are to reopen it from Bristol to Portishead, possibly in 2028. Freight services ceased in 1981 (unrelated to Beeching) and resumed on part of the line in 2002.
- Stourbridge Junction to Walsall line: planned to open part as Midland Metro.
- Henbury Loop as a branch line from Filton Abbey Wood to Henbury, as part of the MetroWest project in the Bristol area, due to reopen in 2026
- Charfield station, South Gloucestershire, proposed to reopen in 2027.

=== "Restoring Your Railway" (2020) ===
In January 2020, the Department for Transport announced a £500 million "Restoring Your Railway" fund and asked MPs, local authorities and community groups to make proposals to reinstate local services and reopen stations. The government also announced £1.5 million towards plans to reopen the Northumberland line, £100,000 towards assessment of the Fleetwood branch line, and £20 million for a third round of the New Stations Fund.

The £500 million would not be spent on building railway lines but on developing proposals through feasibility studies, business cases and designs. Proposals for projects would be sponsored by a local MP, gather local support, and then be put to a panel of experts chaired by the Rail Minister. Examples given were:

- upgrading a freight line to provide passenger services and restoring stations on it
- restoring track and services to an old alignment
- modifying an old route which has been built over.

Successful proposals would receive funding to develop their business case, which would be submitted to the Department for Transport in a bid for more substantial development funding.

In April 2020, the Department for Transport stated that unsuccessful proposals would receive help from the department so they could improve their proposals for a later round of ideas. At the same time, due to the COVID-19 pandemic, the Department announced a third round of ideas for November 2020.

In May 2020, the department announced that ten schemes had been successful in the first round of bidding:

- Reinstatement of Meir station, Stoke-on-Trent
- Reinstatement of the Barrow Hill Line between Sheffield and Chesterfield
- Reinstatement of the Ivanhoe Line between Burton-on-Trent and Leicester
- Reinstatement of the branch lines on the Isle of Wight to Newport and Ventnor
- Reinstatement of the passing loop on the Abbey Line between St Albans Abbey and Watford Junction
- Reopening of stations at Wellington (Somerset) and Cullompton (Devon)
- Reinstatement of the Bury to Heywood and Rochdale lines
- Reinstatement of the Clitheroe to Hellifield line
- Reinstatement of rail access to Devizes via a new station at Lydeway
- Reintroduction of passenger rail services on the Waterside line between Totton and Fawley

In November 2020, the department announced that fifteen further schemes had been successful in the second round of bidding, as well as the restoration of rail links to Okehampton:

- Reopening Beeston Castle and Tarporley, Cheshire
- Reopening St Anne's Park, Bristol
- Reopening Ferryhill, County Durham
- Reinstating links between Bolton, Radcliffe, and Bury Interchange
- Reinstating links between Stratford-upon-Avon to Honeybourne/Worcester Shrub Hill/Oxford
- A new station at Waverley, South Yorkshire
- A new station in the area of Langport/Somerton, Somerset
- Improved services from Melton Mowbray to Nottingham
- Improved services from Falmouth Town to Newquay
- Upgrading the South Fylde Line
- Reinstating the Maid Marian line between Kirkby in Ashfield on the Robin Hood Line and Pye Bridge on the Erewash Valley line
- Reinstating rail access to Cirencester
- Restoring services between Swanage and Wareham (currently Swanage Railway)
- Reinstating the South Humber rail link between Gainsborough Central and Barton-on-Humber
- A new link between Consett and Newcastle

In November 2020, the department announced that five schemes had been successful in the New Stations Fund 3:

- Edginswell, Torquay
- Thanet Parkway, Kent
- St Clears, Carmarthenshire
- Haxby, York
- Deeside Parkway, Flintshire, on the Borderlands line

In October 2021, the third and final round of successful bids were announced, taking the number of schemes accepted for further feasibility studies to 38.

- Reopen the Darlington – Weardale line to passenger services
- Reopen the Ashton – Stockport line to passenger services
- Reopen the Middlewich line in Cheshire to passenger services
- Reopen the Rawtenstall – Buckley Wells line to passenger services
- Reopen Corsham station, Wiltshire
- Reopen Stonehouse Bristol Road station, Gloucestershire
- Reinstate the line and provision of new services, Tavistock – Plymouth
- Reopen the Anglesey Central Railway (Gaerwen – Amlwch) to passenger services
- Reopen the Oswestry to Gobowen branch line
- Reopen the Stoke–Leek line
- Reopen the Askern branch line, Yorkshire
- Reopen the Don Valley line to passenger services
- Reinstate the York-Beverley line

The first project to be completed under the "Restoring Your Railway" banner was the 15½-mile Dartmoor line from Crediton to Okehampton, where services resumed on 20 November 2021. The line had closed to passengers in 1972 but had been operated as a heritage railway from 1997 to 2019. Nine months of work by Network Rail included laying 11 miles (17 km) of new track.

==== Closure of the scheme (2024) ====
Following the change of governing party after the July 2024 general election, the new Chancellor of the Exchequer, Rachel Reeves (Labour), said that projects in the Restoring Your Railway programme that had not commenced would be cancelled, as part of her Commons announcement on 29 July which aimed to reduce national public spending. Reeves said that no money had been spent during that financial year for any of the schemes that were announced as Restoring Your Railway competition winners in 2021, while £76 million had been allocated for 2024–2025.

== See also ==
- History of rail transport in Great Britain 1995 to date
