= Noadswood School =

Location
- North Road; Dibden Purlieu, Hampshire, SO45 4ZF; England
- Coordinates: 50.859°N 1.417°W

Information
- Type: Academy
- Motto: Fit for learning, fit for life
- Local authority: Hampshire
- Specialist: Sports College
- Department for Education URN: 137125 Tables
- Ofsted: Reports
- Chair of Governors: Jackie Rapson
- Headteacher: Kathryn Marshall
- Staff: 150
- Gender: Coeducational
- Age: 11 to 16
- Enrolment: 1,200
- Houses: Deerleap; Wilverley; Anderwood; Knightwood
- Website: www.noadswood.hants.sch.uk

Noadswood School is an academy school and specialist Sports College in Dibden Purlieu, Hampshire, England. It provides state funded education for children from ages 11 to 16.

== Background ==
Noadswood School serves Dibden Purlieu and Hythe on the Southampton Waterside. In 2006, the school became a specialist Sports College. The school has an on-site gymnasium, sports hall, all-weather pitch and playing courts.

In 2010, 81% of Noadswood's Year 11 students attained at least five GCSEs at A*-C grade. 67% attained at least five A*-C grades including English and Maths. These results place the school in the top 25% nationally. Noadswood has a non-selective exam entry policy.

Ofsted (2009) graded Noadswood School as "good with outstanding features". The school's provision of care, guidance and support was rated as being 'excellent'. In 2013, the school was graded as "good with outstanding features".

Noadswood School has a Learning Support Department for students with Special Educational Needs. The school is one of four in Hampshire equipped to support the learning of physically disabled children and there are on-site physiotherapy and occupational therapy facilities.
