= Dibden =

Village and parish in Hampshire, England

Coordinates: 50.8689°N 1.4196°W

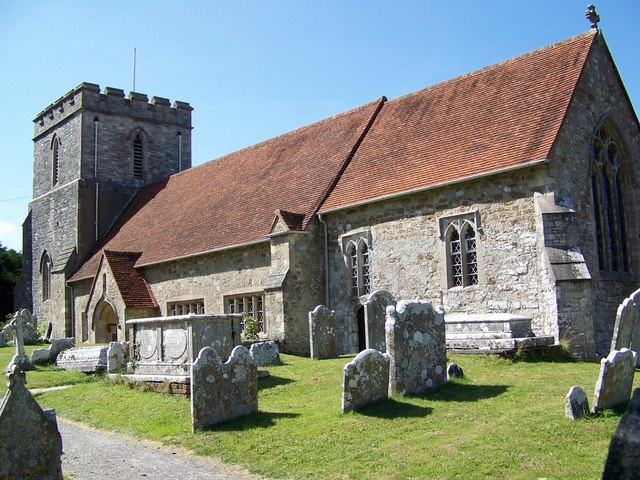
- All Saints, Dibden

- Location within Hampshire
- OS grid reference: SU409079
- Civil parish: Hythe and Dibden
- District: New Forest
- Shire county: Hampshire
- Region: South East
- Country: England
- Sovereign state: United Kingdom
- Post town: SOUTHAMPTON
- Postcode district: SO45
- Dialling code: 023
- Police: Hampshire and Isle of Wight
- Fire: Hampshire and Isle of Wight
- Ambulance: South Central
- UK Parliament: New Forest East

Dibden is a small village in Hampshire, England, which dates from the Middle Ages. It is dominated by the nearby settlements of Hythe and Dibden Purlieu. It is in the civil parish of Hythe and Dibden. It lies on the eastern edge of the New Forest in a valley, which runs into Southampton Water.

== History ==
The name "Dibden" is from the Old English for "deep valley", although the village is only slightly lower than the land around it. It is listed in the Domesday Book of 1086 as "Depedene" and was held by Odo of Winchester. Prior to 1066 it had been held by "Ketil the Steersman" from King Edward. There was a saltpan and a fishery in the manor.

The overlordship of Dibden belonged in the 12th century to Reynold de St. Valery, who died in 1166, and his son Bernard de St. Valery, who was killed at the siege of Acon in 1192, was probably the Bernard who was lord of Dibden in 1167. Descending with his granddaughters to Robert Count of Dreux, it fell, with the rest of the honour of St. Valery, into the hands of the Crown, when it was given to Richard, 1st Earl of Cornwall whose son Edmund, 2nd Earl of Cornwall died in 1300 seised of a fee there which belonged to the honour of St. Valery. Dibden was thereafter held of the Crown. It was thus held in the reign of Henry VII of Arthur, Prince of Wales.

The demesne of Dibden was at an early time split up into three parts:

In the 12th century, Reynold de St. Valery gave a third of the manor to Edmund and Osbert de Dibden. Nicholas de Dibden held this third of Dibden of Edmund Earl of Cornwall in 1300. The Dibdens held their one third of the estate down to 1428, when Agnes, daughter and heir of Thomas de Dibden, inherited it. It passed to her daughter, Alice, who became the wife of Richard Waller of Groombridge, who died in 1486. It stayed in the Waller family until 1594 when William Waller sold the manor to William Webbe, who was already lord of the other two manors in Dibden.

The part known as Dibden Hanger derived its name from the family first found holding it: John atte Hanger holding the land there in 1276. Richard son of Richard atte Hanger held this third of Edmund Earl of Cornwall in 1300. His son and namesake held it in 1346. By 1422 both this and the manor of Dibden Poleyn had come to the hands of John Hall, who granted them at that date to John Rogers. In 1544 Sir John Rogers sold the manors to William Webb, Mayor of Salisbury in 1523 and 1534. His son William Webbe died seised of the manors in 1585, leaving a son William, who in 1594 purchased the manor of "Dibden's Fee," thus uniting the three estates.

In 1300 Walter Nott held one-third of Dibden from Edmund Earl of Cornwall. Sixteen years later John Nott held it. In 1360 Walter Nott, parson of the church of Michelmersh, reserved a messuage and 2 carucates in Dibden from a grant of land which he made to Romsey Abbey. Shortly after this the estate came into the hands of the family which gave it the distinctive name of Dibden Poleyn. John Poleyn held it in 1369 and the Poleyn family was still holding it in 1413. By 1422 the manor had come, with Dibden Hanger, to the hands of John Hall, and thereafter followed the same descent.

After 1594 the three estates were united. William Webbe owned it when he died in 1627, leaving an only daughter and heir Rachel wife of Sir John Croke of Chilton. Their son John Croke had succeeded by 1650. The Harris family owned the estate throughout the 18th century. James Harris dealt with the manor by fine in 1756, and his son James Harris, 1st Earl of Malmesbury presented to the church in 1796. It passed out of their hands before the middle of the 19th century, and in 1862, it was sold to the Romsey Charity Commissioners who owned the manor into the 20th century.

The church of All Saints, which was built about 1291, was destroyed in an air raid on 20 June 1940. It was restored and reopened on 2 April 1955 using much of the original material. Buried in the churchyard are members of the Lisle family, Royalists who fought against Monmouth in the Battle of Sedgemoor.

At the beginning of the 20th century, Dibden consisted of a large number of farms scattered around the little cluster of buildings which still constitutes the village of Dibden. Like nearby Beaulieu, Dibden was at one time a liberty. The civil parish of Dibden was created in 1894. The village of Hythe was taken from Fawley parish and added to Dibden parish in 1913. Since the 1950s the villages of Hythe and Dibden Purlieu have grown enormously, and today the parish is dominated by those two settlements. In 1983 the parish was renamed to Hythe and Dibden, to reflect the importance of Hythe as a new focal point of the Parish.
