= Dibden Purlieu =

Village in Hampshire, England

Coordinates: 50.852°N 1.415°W

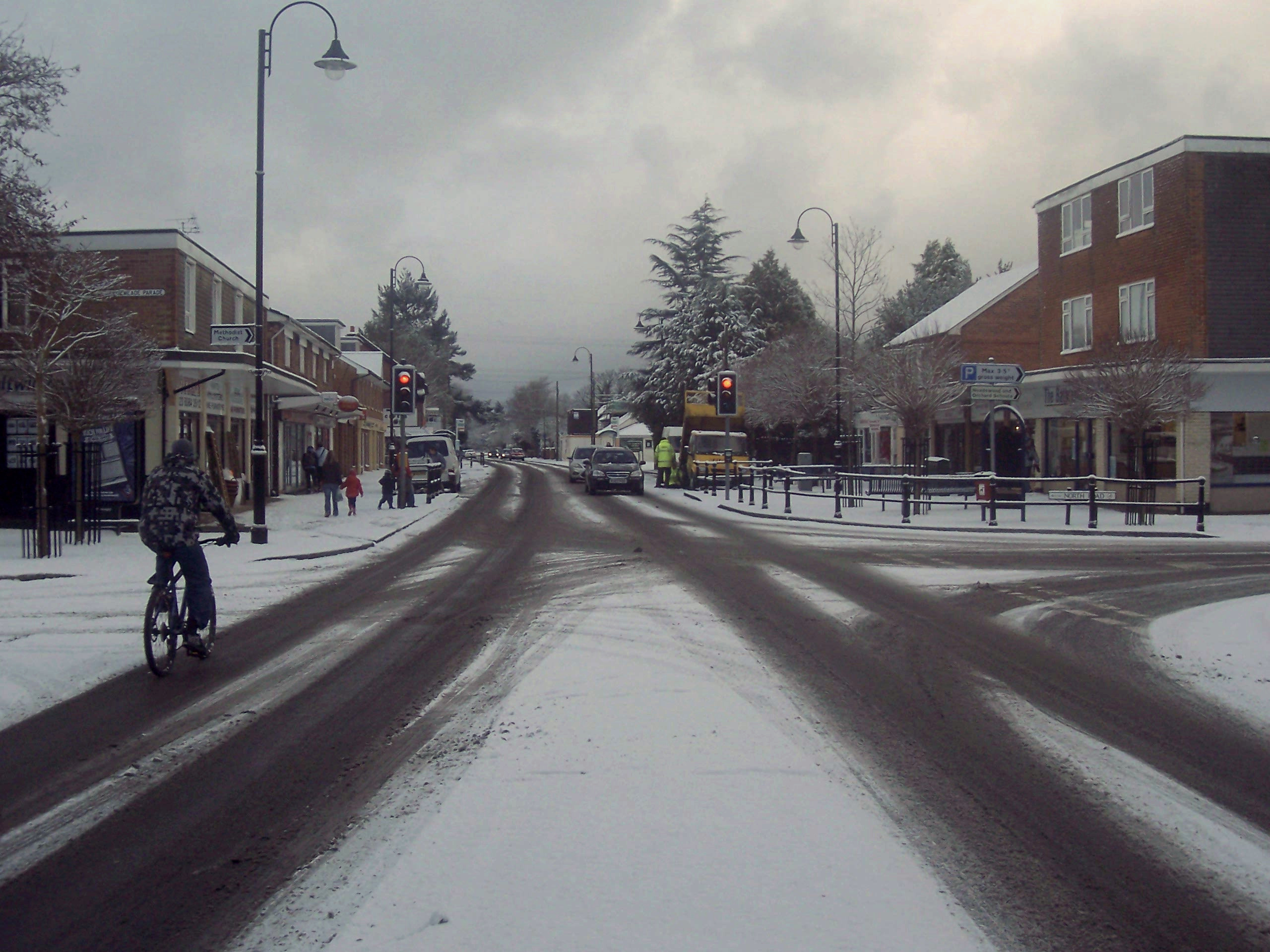
- Dibden Purlieu village centre following snowfall

- Location within Hampshire
- OS grid reference: SU412061
- Civil parish: Hythe and Dibden
- District: New Forest
- Shire county: Hampshire
- Region: South East
- Country: England
- Sovereign state: United Kingdom
- Post town: SOUTHAMPTON
- Postcode district: SO45
- Dialling code: 023
- Police: Hampshire and Isle of Wight
- Fire: Hampshire and Isle of Wight
- Ambulance: South Central
- UK Parliament: New Forest East

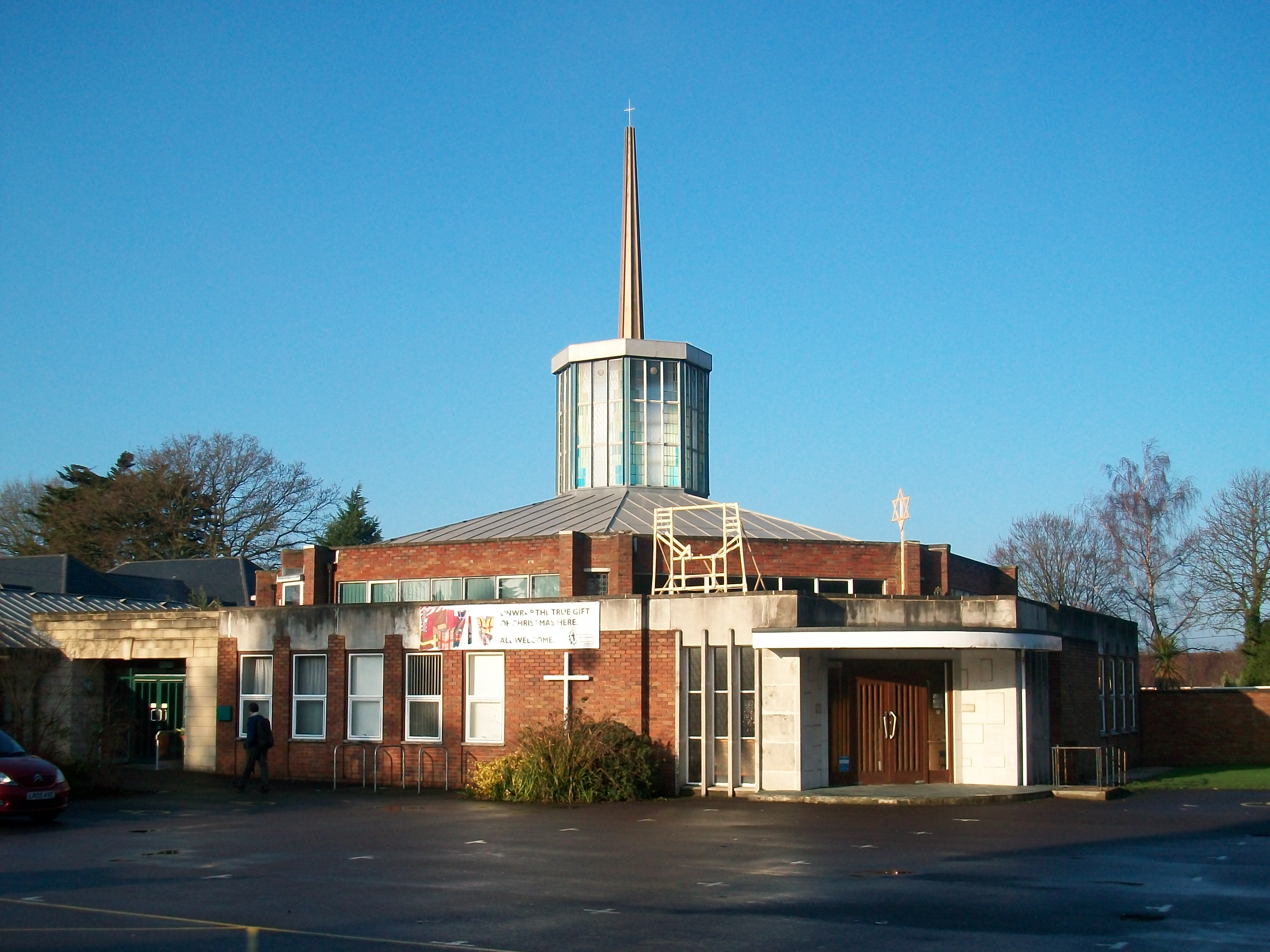
St Andrew's Church in Dibden Purlieu

Dibden Purlieu (/ˌdɪbdɛn ˈpɜːrliuː/) is a village situated on the edge of the New Forest in Hampshire, England. The village merges with the nearby town of Hythe. It is in the civil parish of Hythe and Dibden.

The approximate population is around 4000 people. The regular Bluestar bus services provide Purlieu's quickest link with the city of Southampton. Dibden Purlieu is twinned with Mauves-sur-Loire, France.

== History ==
Dibden Purlieu was in the parish of Dibden, referred to in the Domesday Book of 1086 as Deepdene, "dene" being an Anglo-Saxon word for valley. Purlieu is a Norman-French word meaning "the outskirts of a forest" – a place free from forest laws. In this particular case Dibden Purlieu was land removed from the New Forest in the 14th century when the forest boundaries were established by perambulations about 1300. In practice the king retained or claimed, certain rights in the area, and the activities of the royal foresters in enforcing forest law there were a matter of great resentment. Up to the 1950s Dibden Purlieu was a small settlement next to the village of Dibden, but the expansion of Fawley Refinery led to a demand for more houses for workers, and Hythe and Dibden Purlieu were allowed to expand into a small town. In 1983 the parish was renamed, and Dibden Purlieu is now part of the parish of Hythe and Dibden.

== Notable residents ==
- Richard Eurich RA OBE was the war artist for the Admiralty in 1941.
- Ron Lane was a wood sculptor of wildlife.
- Damian Shirazi (born 1983), cricketer, grew up in the village

== Schools ==
Dibden Purlieu has two large secondary schools; Noadswood School and Applemore College. Totton College also has a small campus in the village that specialises in adult education services.

Primary education is now provided at several schools in the village. Wildground, was the first in Armitage Avenue. The junior school opened on this site in 1962, with the infants' premises following two years later. Prior to that, the school had occupied temporary accommodation on Lunedale Road, which later included the use of the adjacent Women's Institute Hall. The village had further primary's schools added with the opening in the late 60s of the separate Orchard Infant and Orchard Junior schools on Water Lane, adjacent to Noadswood School.
