= Fawley branch line =

Branch railway in Hampshire, England

Coordinates: 50.8718°N 1.4121°W

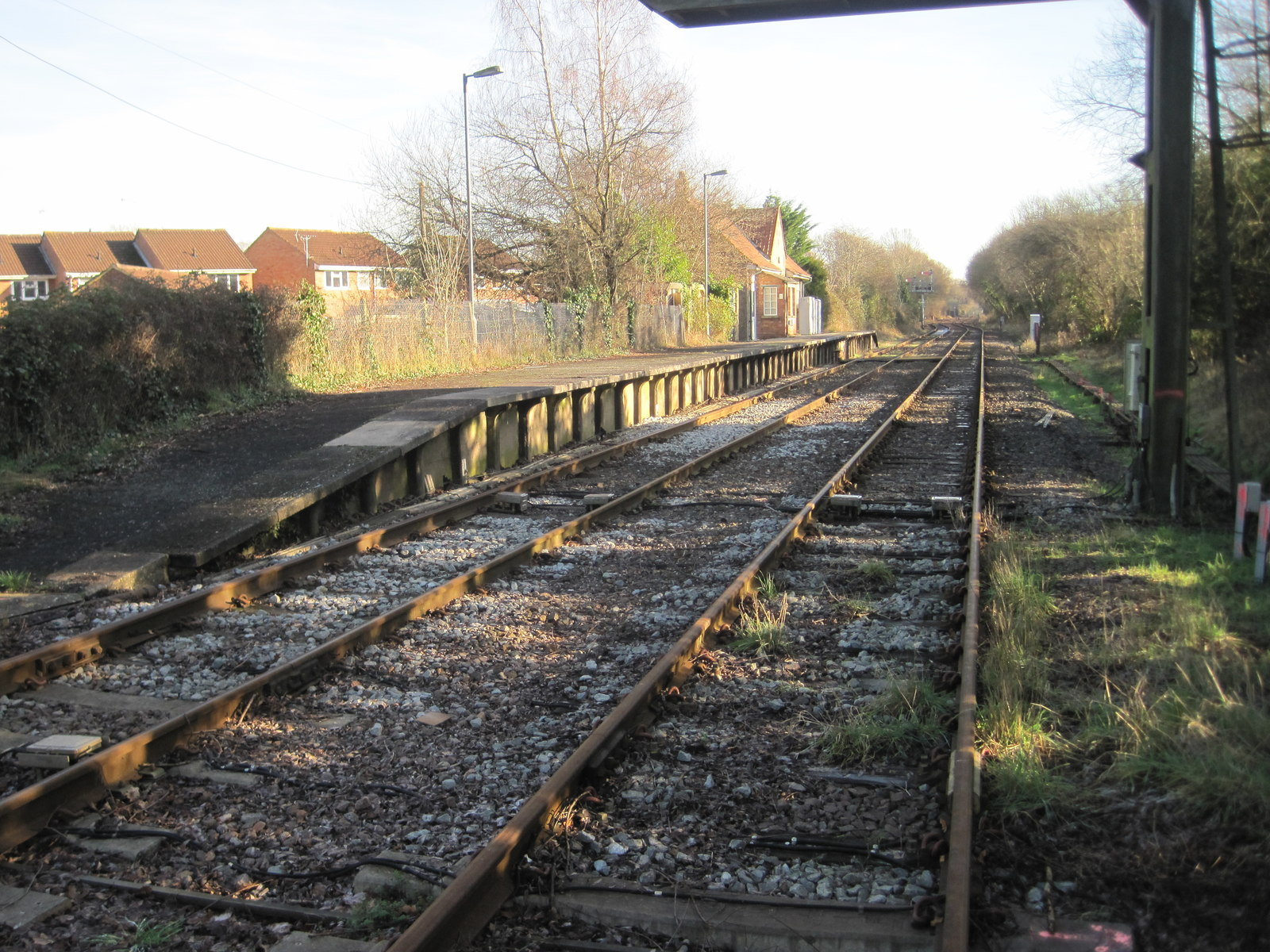
- Site of Marchwood railway station

Overview
- Stations: 0

Service
- Type: Heavy rail

History
- Opened: 1925

Technical
- Line length: 8 mi (13 km)
- Track gauge: 4 ft 8 1/2 in (1,435 mm)
Route map
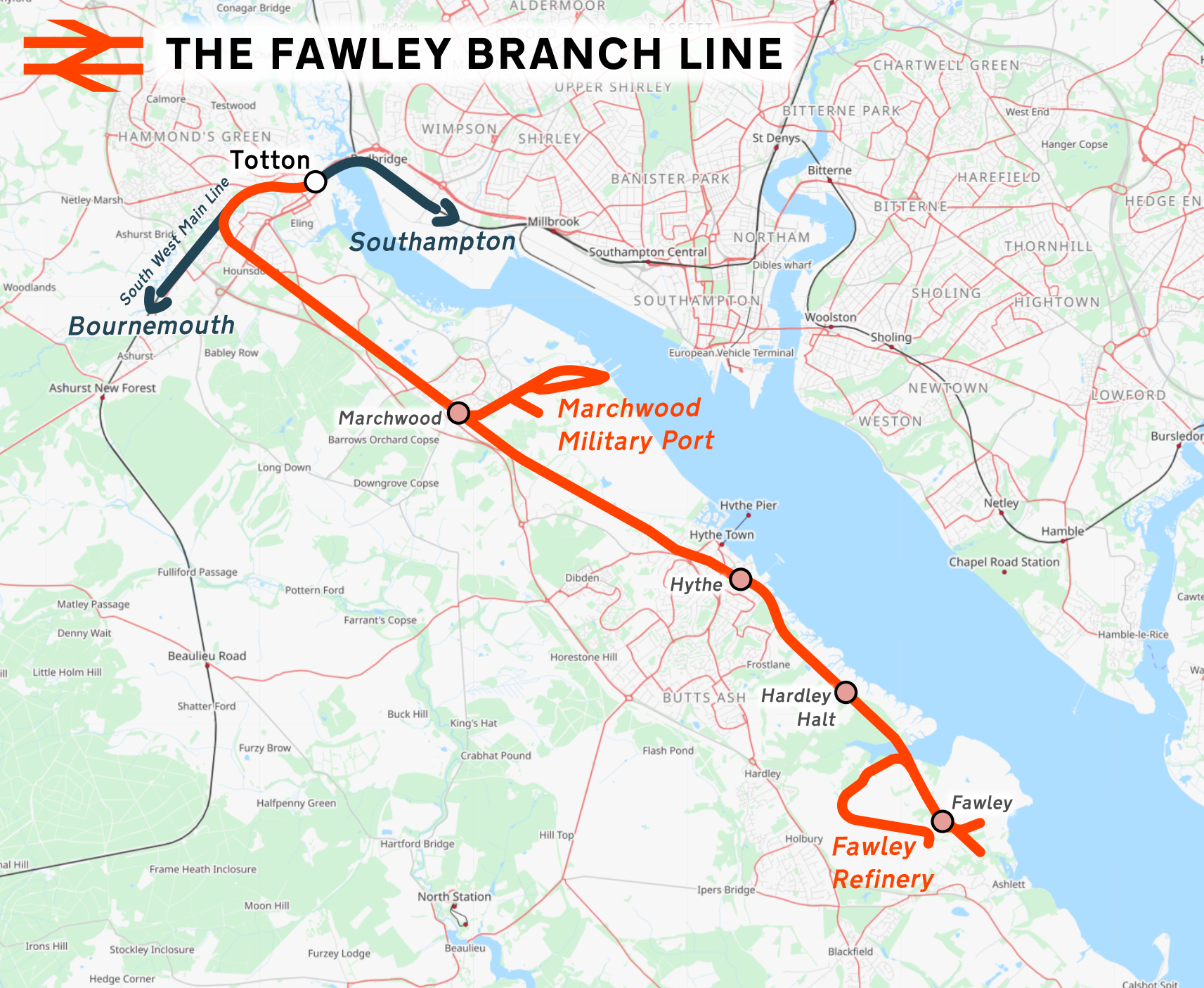
(Click to expand)

The Fawley branch line, also known as the Waterside line, is a standard-gauge railway line to Fawley, in the English county of Hampshire. It is on the opposite side of Southampton Water from the city of Southampton itself, in an area known as Waterside. For 40 years a passenger service operated, but this was withdrawn except for the occasional enthusiasts' railtour. The line serves the freight needs of Marchwood Military Port, having also served the same function for Fawley Refinery until 2016.

A proposal to reopen the line to passengers with two stations at Marchwood and Hythe and trains to Southampton Central was first made in 2009 and was incorporated into the plans for the Restoring Your Railway fund. The fund was cancelled in September 2024, resulting in the proposal for restoring passenger services being scrapped as a result.

== History ==
Authorised after some years of trying by the Totton, Hythe, and Fawley Light Railway Order 1903, the line was built under the Light Railways Act 1896 as the Totton, Hythe and Fawley Light Railway and opened on 20 July 1925. It begins at South West Main Line at Totton, west of Southampton, where Bournemouth-bound trains run parallel with the branch for one mile (1.6 km) before curving away to the south.

The passenger service served Marchwood, Hythe, and Fawley. Between Hythe and Fawley there was a Hardley Halt which opened for workmen in 1958 and closed in 1965. Operated by steam trains, then the Hampshire diesel-electric multiple units, the service was withdrawn on 14 February 1966.

At first, traffic was light but they subsequently expanded when the then largest oil refinery in Britain opened at Fawley in the 1920s. The line became part of the British Railways (Southern Region) following nationalisation in 1948. The first station to be closed was Hardley Halt on 5 April 1965, followed by Marchwood, Hythe and Fawley on 14 February 1966. The line was then only used by freight from Marchwood Military Port and Fawley Refinery until 2016.

== Reopening proposal ==
On 16 June 2009 the Association of Train Operating Companies announced it was looking into the reopening of the railway as far as Hythe, with a possibility of a further extension to Fawley if agreement could be reached with Esso, which owns the land where Fawley railway station once stood. The proposals were:

- Reopening of all former stations along the line.
- A new station in Totton called Totton West, sited just west of the junction with the main line.
- A new train service from Fawley or Hythe to Totton and on via Southampton Central, Southampton Airport Parkway, Eastleigh, Chandlers Ford and Romsey before returning to Southampton Central, Totton and Fawley or Hythe, also serving other intermediate stations.

It was envisaged that the railway link could be built over a five to 10 year period at a cost of around £3 million. The service would be operated by the then franchisee South West Trains using diesel multiple units (DMUs). If the scheme delivered a sufficient financial return, there would be a future possibility of electrification. The service was planned to run half-hourly during peak times and hourly at other times.

On 8 November 2013 Councillor David Harrison of Totton South and Marchwood obtained a copy of the final GRIP 3 Study report and shared it via his website. In the report it was stated that the service would be half-hourly, using DMUs calling at all stations between Hythe and Southampton, including a new station to be called Hounsdown (once planned to be called Totton West). A new passing loop would have to be installed at Hounsdown to allow passing of freight and passenger trains. Other upgrades would include AWS/TPWS and signalling. For reasons of security at the oil refinery, Fawley station would not be reopened as part of the scheme. It has been pointed out that there are some possible drawbacks to this scheme. For example, if the Waterside line gets the green light, the subsidy from Hampshire County Council for the Southampton & Hythe ferry service would be likely to cease, and the local bus companies which operate in the area might be at risk of losing some of their subsidy. On 21 January 2014 Hampshire County Council decided to shelve the plans to reopen the line. The council's report came down against committing further funding for the scheme due to a perceived poor value for money business case, although it said the authority should review the position should local circumstances change.

The last train serving the refinery ran on 1 September 2016, after which trains would normally run only as far as Marchwood, although the occasional private hire train would travel the branch line as far as the gates at Fawley oil refinery.

Hampshire County Council announced in November 2017 that it would look again at running passenger service due to planned housing development alongside the Waterside and on the former Fawley power plant site.

In August 2018, it was revealed that plans to reopen the line had been resurrected as part of the redevelopment known as Fawley Waters. It proposed a half-hourly service on a Monday to Saturday from Southampton Central to Fawley. At Marchwood the journey time would take 12 minutes and the line would be 60 miles per hour (100 km/h). The new Fawley station would be called ‘Hythe & Fawley Parkway’. In November 2018 Hampshire County Council announced the removal of the Hythe Ferry subsidy, despite there being no progress on the proposed rail scheme.

On 5 February 2019, the branch line was identified as a priority for reopening to passenger use by Campaign for Better Transport. Campaign for Better Transport went on to say that reopening the line would reduce air pollution and relieve pressure on congested roads adjacent to the New Forest National Park.

On 23 May 2020, the DfT announced that the Waterside Line had been shortlisted for further funding to investigate restoration of passenger services under Restoring Your Railway. This would see the reinstatement of Marchwood station and a new station at Hythe Town, a little further west of the previous station. The end of the 8-mile (13 km) line would be unused, but a southern terminus, called Hythe and Fawley Parkway, would open on the site of the Hardley Halt station.

On 28 July 2020, South Western Railway ran a 'fact-finding train' down the branch line, stopping at Marchwood, to demonstrate the branch line's potential. This service carried the station's first passengers in 54 years.

In February 2021, Hampshire County Council released an updated strategic outline business case. In the report, 3 new proposed service patterns were put forward;

- 1 train per hour (tph) running between Salisbury or Romsey and Hythe & Fawley Parkway
- 1 tph running between Salisbury or Romsey and Hythe & Fawley Parkway, and 1 tph running between London Victoria and Hythe & Fawley Parkway
- 3 tph running between Southampton and Hythe & Fawley Parkway

In the business case, it would see Marchwood station reopen, possibly with an up and down platform, and electrification of the line, though both depend on the service pattern chosen above. Hythe station would be relocated north of the existing station between School Road and New Road, near Hythe Library and a new station called Hythe and Fawley Parkway, which would be located on the site of the former Hardley Halt. A local bus shuttle would operate from Hythe & Fawley Parkway station to Fawley and the housing development on the former Fawley Power Plant site. It also proposes that three level crossings would be replaced with overbridges to minimise traffic disruption in the local areas.

On 7 May 2021, South Western Railway ran another fact-finding train down the branch line, stopping at Marchwood, to further demonstrate the branch line's potential.

On 24 March 2022 Rail reported that Network Rail is taking forward the scheme to get the line reopened. However, the proposed Hythe & Fawley Parkway station, 2 miles (3 km) south of Hythe will not be included. The service that Network Rail is proposing is a 2 car Class 158/9, running every 30 minutes between Hythe and Southampton Central. The business case is due to be submitted towards the end of 2022 to the Department of Transport, with a prospect of getting a decision in early 2024 and passenger services starting in 2025 at the earliest.

A series of public consultations were held between Monday 8 August and Friday 9 September 2022 to hear views on reintroducing passenger services to the Waterside Line. On 30 November, Network Rail reported that 84 per cent of people backed the proposal to reinstate the line for passenger service.

The cancellation of Restoring Your Railway was announced in September 2024, and with it the reopening of the Fawley branch line to passengers.

In July 2025, Grand Union announced plans to introduce a new hourly service between Marchwood and London Waterloo, operating under its Alliance Rail banner. The proposed route would call at Totton, Southampton Central, Southampton Airport Parkway, Eastleigh, Winchester, Basingstoke, and Hook, before running fast to London Waterloo. The plans form part of a wider proposal to reopen sections of the former Totton–Hythe branch line, which closed to passengers in 1966 but retains its track, signalling and level crossings. Longer‑term ambitions include reopening a relocated station at Hythe and developing a Park & Ride facility between Hythe and Hardley.

Grand Union states that the service would build on a recent comprehensive study into reopening the Waterside Line, with further sections potentially restored in a phased approach. The operation would be based locally, with trains maintained at Eastleigh or possibly Marchwood, and is expected to create around 80 full‑time jobs. The company plans to use refurbished rolling stock with reconfigured interiors offering both standard and first‑class accommodation.

According to the operator, the service would provide a direct connection from Totton to London throughout the day, increase service frequency at Eastleigh, and offer journey times of around 45 minutes between Hook and London. Grand Union also states that it intends to offer lower fares than inter‑available tickets, with on‑train ticket purchasing and railcard acceptance. A seat guarantee scheme would refund 50% of the fare if a seat cannot be provided on journeys over 30 minutes.

As of July 2025, the proposal remained under consideration by the Office of Rail and Road (ORR). Local councillor David Harrison reported that Grand Union was continuing discussions with Network Rail, and that Porterbrook had requested a Class 769 gauging run between Waterloo and Marchwood to assess clearance issues. A decision from the ORR was expected in September or October 2025.

In April 2026, further progress was reported on Alliance Rail’s proposal for a new Marchwood–Southampton–London Waterloo service. Both RailAdvent and the Southern Daily Echo stated that the Office of Rail and Road (ORR) was expected to issue a decision within the next two months regarding the application (expected by June 2026).

Alliance Rail confirmed that significant work had been undertaken to finalise a workable timetable and identify the infrastructure requirements needed to restore passenger services on the Totton–Marchwood section of the former Fawley branch line. The company also announced that the Class 769 bi‑mode units intended for the service had received certification to operate on the South West Main Line, allowing them to begin testing and gauging runs if approval is granted. The units are capable of operating on diesel between Marchwood and Totton and on third‑rail electric power for the remainder of the route.

Alliance Rail stated that Network Rail’s draft 2027 timetable includes paths for the proposed service, which the operator argues demonstrates that sufficient capacity exists on the route. Managing Director Ian Yeowart highlighted the “significant cross‑party support” from MPs, local authorities and stakeholders, and compared the proposal to recent successful reopenings such as the Okehampton and Northumberland lines.

The Daily Echo reiterated that the scheme would create around 80 full‑time jobs, and that previous attempts to restore passenger services had stalled in 2024 when a publicly funded proposal was deemed not to offer value for money. The new open‑access proposal remains privately funded.
