= Damian Shirazi =

English cricketer and educator

Personal information
- Full name: Damian Cyrus Shirazi
- Born: 23 March 1983 (age 43); Neath, Glamorgan, Wales
- Batting: Left-handed
- Bowling: Right-arm medium

Domestic team information
- Years: Team
- 2005–2008: Wiltshire
- 2009–2014: Oxfordshire

Career statistics
Competition	First-class	List A
Matches	4	4
Runs scored	139	117
Batting average	34.75	39.00
100s/50s	–/–	1/–
Top score	46*	101
Balls bowled	36	0
Wickets	1	–
Bowling average	33.00	–
5 wickets in innings	–	–
10 wickets in match	–	–
Best bowling	1/33	–
Catches/stumpings	2/–	–/–
- Source: Cricinfo, 13 March 2022

Damian Cyrus Shirazi (born 23 March 1986) is a Welsh-born English educator and former cricketer.

Shirazi was born at Neath, but grew up in England at Dibden Purlieu in Hampshire. He played his early club cricket for BAT Sports and had been on the books of Hampshire County Cricket Club since he was ten, playing matches for the county second XI between 2000 and 2004, which included a handful on the Nursery Ground at the Rose Bowl. In 2000, he was selected to play for the Hampshire Cricket Board (HCB) representative team in the NatWest Trophy against Huntingdonshire at Cove, making his List A one-day debut in the process. He made three further one-day appearances for the HCB up until 2003, with Shirazi scoring a century against Wiltshire in 2002.

Alongside cricket Shirazi began studying sports science at the Southampton Institute in 2002. Following a successful club season with BAT Sports in 2002, where he scored over 500 runs, in addition to scoring 1,326 runs for the Marylebone Cricket Club Young Cricketers, Shirazi was selected to tour with the British Universities cricket team on their two-week winter tour of South Africa; he was the first student at the institute to be selected for the team. The following season he played first-class cricket for the team against the touring New Zealanders at Fenner's. After completing his studies at the Southampton Institute, he proceeded to Loughborough University where he studied for his master's degree in coaching. He was a member of the Loughborough UCCE team and played two first-class matches for them in 2006 against Essex at Chelmsford, and Hampshire at the Rose Bowl. He also played a further first-class match in 2006 against the touring Sri Lankans at Fenner's, where he helped to secure a draw with 20 runs in over two hours on the final day delaying what looked like a likely victory for the Sri Lankans. In four first-class matches, Shirazi scored 139 runs at an average of 34.75 and a highest score of 46 not out. He played minor counties cricket for Wiltshire from 2008, appearing for the county in the Minor Counties Championship and MCCA Knockout Trophy as an opening batsman. He joined Oxford ahead of the 2009 season, playing minor counties cricket for Oxfordshire until 2014.

Shirazi is currently the master in charge of cricket at Epsom College, having previously held the same position at Dulwich College.
