= William Scammell =

British poet

William Scammell (2 January 1939, in Southampton – 29 November 2000) was a British poet.

== Life ==
He was born into a working-class family in the waterside village of Hythe on Southampton Water, but failed the eleven-plus exam. His brother is Michael Scammell.

He enrolled as a mature student at Bristol University. He taught at the Workers' Educational Association. He moved to the Lake District, with his artist wife, Jackie, and their two sons. In 1975, he moved to Cockermouth to teach at the Newcastle University. In 1991, he taught at Nottingham Trent University.

His work appeared in Granta, and Lives of the Poets,

== Awards ==
- 1982 Cholmondeley Award

== Work ==
=== Poetry ===
- —— (1979). Yes and No. Peterloo. ISBN 9780905291185.
- —— (1982). A Second Life. Peterloo. ISBN 9780905291383.
- —— (1985). Jouissance. Peterloo. ISBN 9780905291611.
- —— (1987). Eldorado. Peterloo. ISBN 9780905291888.
- —— (1992). Bleeding Heart Yard. Peterloo Poets. ISBN 9781871471281.
- —— (1992). Stare at the Moon. Bleeding Heart Yard.
- —— (1992). The Game: Tennis Poems. Peterloo Poets. ISBN 9781871471274.
- —— (1993). Five Easy Pieces. Sinclair-Stevenson. ISBN 9781856193153.
- —— (1994). Barnacle Bill. Dedalus Press. ISBN 9781873790663.
- —— (1998). All Set to Fall Off the Edge of the World. Flambard Press.

=== Editor ===
- Hughes, Ted (1983). William Scammell (ed.). Winter Pollen. Picador USA. ISBN 9780312136253.
- William Scammell, ed. (1991). The New Lake Poets. Bloodaxe Books. ISBN 9781852241469.
- William Scammell, ed. (1992). This Green Earth: A Celebration of Nature Poetry. Ellenbank. ISBN 9781873551042.
- Debjani Chatterjee, William Scammell, ed. (1991). Northern Poetry. Littlewood Press. ISBN 9780946407507.

=== Essays ===
- William Scammell (17 April 1994). "BOOK REVIEW / Could be much verse". The Independent.
- Hank Lazer, ed. (1988). "From 'Living in the World'". Title On Louis Simpson: depths beyond happiness. University of Michigan Press. ISBN 978-0-472-06382-6.
- "Words and Silences". Spectator. 281 (8882): 50–1. 31 October 1998.
- "In pursuit of the unspeakable". The Spectator. 23 September 2000.
