= Hardley Halt railway station =

Railway station in Hardley, England

Hardley Halt

General information
- Location: Hardley, New Forest; England
- Coordinates: 50.8511°N 1.3729°W
- Platforms: 1

Other information
- Status: Disused

History
- Original company: Southern Region of British Railways

Key dates
- 5 April 1954: Opened
- 5 April 1965: Closed
Location

Hardley Halt was a railway station on the Fawley branch line.

The station was opened on 5 April 1954 and was closed to passengers on 5 April 1965 (11 years after opening).

The line has been identified as a priority for reopening to passenger use by Campaign for Better Transport.

Preceding station	Historical railways	Following station
Hythe (Hampshire)	Southern Region of British Railways; Fawley Branch Line	Fawley

== Future ==
In February 2021, Hampshire County Council released an updated strategic outline business case for the Fawley branch line. In the report, 3 new proposed service patterns were put forward;

- 1 train per hour (tph) running between Salisbury or Romsey and Hythe & Fawley Parkway
- 1 tph running between Salisbury or Romsey and Hythe & Fawley Parkway, and 1 tph running between London Victoria and Hythe & Fawley Parkway
- 3 tph running between Southampton and Hythe & Fawley Parkway

In the business case, it would see Marchwood station reopen, possibly with an up and down platform, and electrification of the line, though both depend on the service pattern chosen above. Hythe station would be relocated north of the existing station between School Road and New Road, near Hythe Library and a new station called Hythe and Fawley Parkway, which would be located on the site of the former Hardley Halt. A local bus shuttle would operate from Hythe & Fawley Parkway station to Fawley and the housing development on the former Fawley Power Plant site. It also proposes that three level crossings would be replaced with overbridges to minimise traffic disruption in the local areas.

On 24 March 2022 Rail reported that Network Rail is taking forward the scheme to get the line reopened. However, the proposed Hythe & Fawley Parkway station, 2 miles (3 km) south of Hythe will not be included. The service that Network Rail is proposing is a 2 car Class 158/9, running every 30 minutes between Hythe and Southampton. The business case is due to be submitted towards the end of 2022 to the Department of Transport, with a prospect of getting a decision in early 2024 and passenger services starting in 2025 at the earliest.
