= Ron Lane =

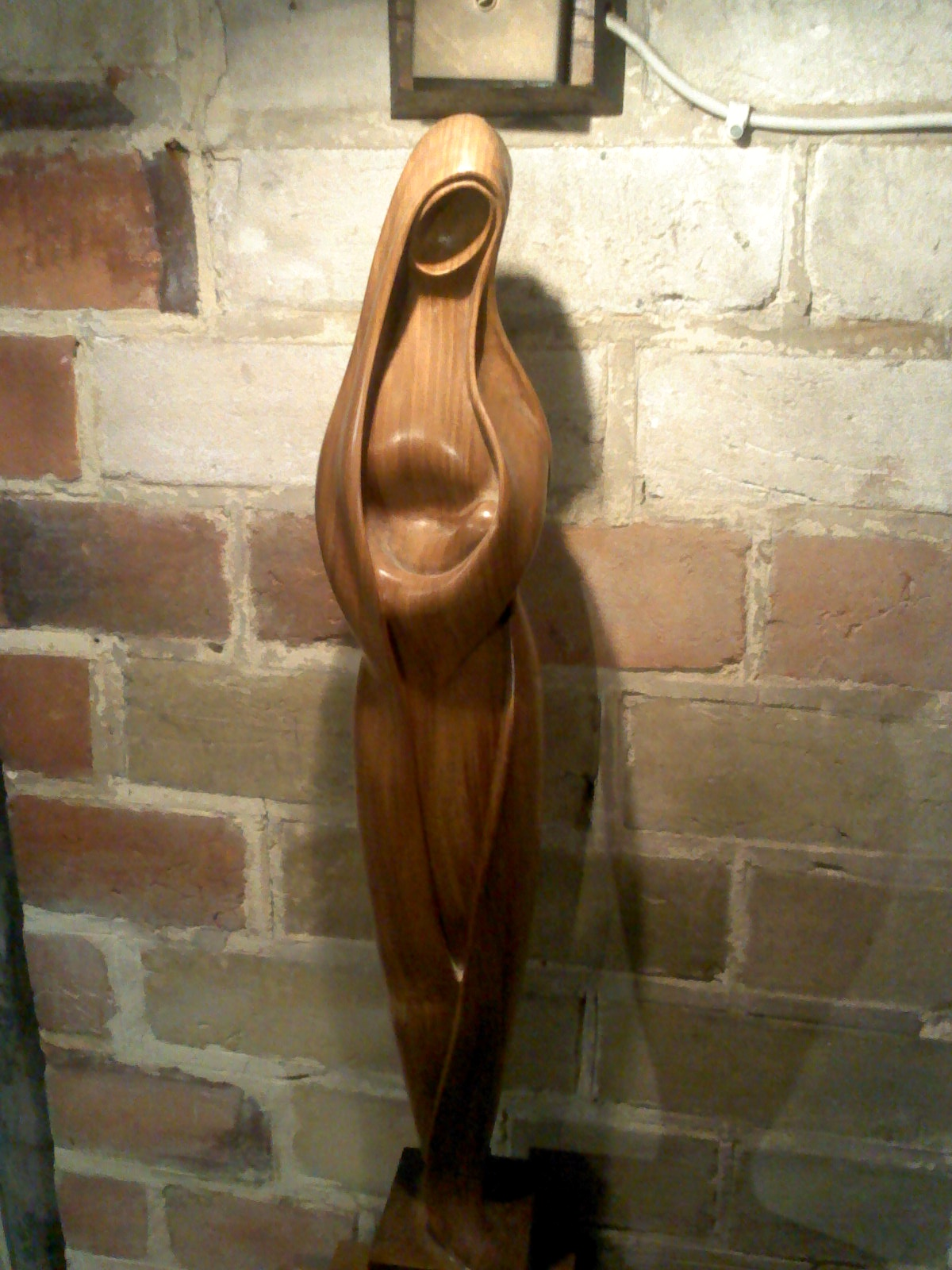
Sculpture of the madonna and child in St Michael & All Angels Church, Lyndhurst

Ron Lane (died 1976) was a woodcarver who lived in the New Forest region of Hampshire, England.

Ron Lane was a resident of Dibden Purlieu in Hampshire. He was married to Eleanor. In his lifetime he produced hundreds of wood carvings. Many of his carvings sought to capture in wood the wildlife he saw around him, and included sculptures of dogs, pheasants, owls, otters, mice, birds and fishes.

Sculptures on public display include:

- A sculpture of the madonna and child in St Michael & All Angels Church, Lyndhurst, Hampshire. The sculpture was dedicated in November 1971. Ron Lane gave a talk about his work in the church in 1972.
- An oak font cover in St Michael's Church, Inkpen. This font cover entitled "in praise of water" was made in 1972. It features walnut carvings of a series of water creatures including a vole, a dipper, a newt, a kingfisher, and a teal.
- A sculpture of the madonna and child in St Mary's Church, Crawley, Hampshire. The sculpture was a gift from two American parishioners in 1973.

The Ron Lane Memorial Prize is a regional award for excellence in woodcarving.
