= Totton railway station =

Railway station in Hampshire, England

Totton
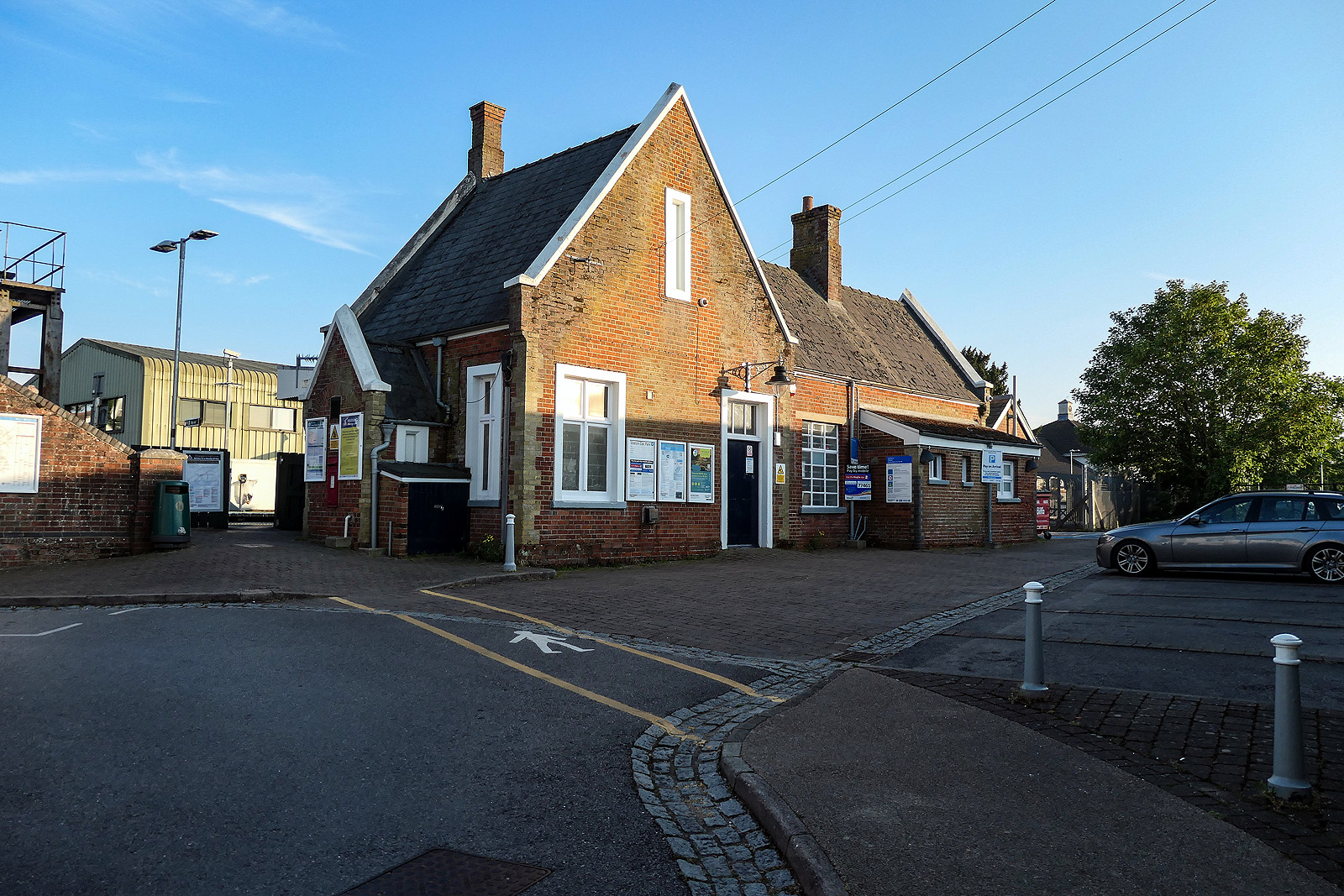
- The station building in 2023

General information
- Location: Totton and Eling, District of New Forest, England
- Coordinates: 50.9178°N 1.4826°W
- Grid reference: SU364132
- Managed by: South Western Railway
- Platforms: 2

Other information
- Station code: TTN
- Classification: DfT category E

History
- Original company: Southampton and Dorchester Railway
- Pre-grouping: London and South Western Railway
- Post-grouping: Southern Railway

Key dates
- 1859: Station opened as Eling Junction
- April 1859: Renamed Totton for Eling
- ?: Renamed Totton

Passengers
- 2020/21: ▼75,754
- 2021/22: ▲0.177 million
- 2022/23: ▲0.200 million
- 2023/24: ▲0.203 million
- 2024/25: ▲0.216 million
Location
Notes
- Passenger statistics from the Office of Rail and Road

Totton railway station serves the towns of Totton and Eling, in Hampshire, England. It is a stop on the South West Main Line and is 82 miles 43 chains (132.8 km) down the line from London Waterloo. It is managed by South Western Railway, which also operates services that stop at the station.

== History ==
The station was constructed by the London and South Western Railway and opened in 1859 as Eling Junction, after the name of the junction with the Eling Tramway branch located adjacent to the station. It was renamed Totton later the same year, after the growing community surrounding the station.

The station passed into the ownership of the Southern Railway following the passing of the Railways Act 1921 and the subsequent grouping. It became the junction station for the Fawley Branch Line, which opened in 1925. Following nationalisation of the railways in 1948, the station became part of British Railways' Southern Region; it is now owned by Network Rail and operated by South Western Railway.

Previously, the station was the terminus of a local service that ran from Totton to Romsey, via a horseshoe-shaped route through Southampton Central and Chandler's Ford. This was changed on 9 December 2007, following the new franchise, to a 'six shaped' route from Salisbury to Romsey via Southampton Central and Chandler's Ford.

== Facilities ==
The station has few facilities, with a ticket office only open during weekday morning peak hours; there is also a ticket machine available. It has a waiting room, located within the station building on platform 1, but is only available for use during the weekday morning peak time when the station staff are available. A small car park, with 11 spaces, is available for passengers.

Access to the station is available from both the north and south sides of the station, with a footbridge available to cross the track. The station entrances and the footbridge are located at the extreme east end of the platforms; there are no ticket gates present on the station meaning that the footbridge is accessible to any pedestrian wishing to cross the line.

There are two platforms:

- Platform 1: located on the north side of the station, for trains heading east towards Southampton Central and London Waterloo. A covered awning provides shelter and there are cycle shelters.
- Platform 2: located on the south side of the station, for trains heading west towards Brockenhurst, Bournemouth and Weymouth. There is a small shelter. It is accessible to wheelchair users at the west end of the platform via a pathway from High Street along the former Eling Tramway Route, which was completed in late 2024.

== Service ==
The typical off peak service pattern in trains per hour is:

- 1 tph to Bournemouth
- 1 tph to Winchester

There are additional services to Poole, Basingstoke and London Waterloo at peak times.

On Sundays, the station is served by an hourly service between London Waterloo and Poole.

The now freight-only Fawley branch line leaves the main line a short distance west of the station. The line has been identified as a priority for reopening to passenger use by Campaign for Better Transport.

Preceding station	National Rail	Following station
Southampton Central	South Western Railway South West Main Line	Ashurst New Forest
Redbridge Limited service	South Western Railway South West Main Line	Ashurst New Forest
	Historical railways	
Terminus	Southern Railway; Fawley Branch Line	Marchwood

== Connections ==
The station is also served by several bus services that stop on Commercial Road, to the north of the station; bus operators include First Hants and Dorset, Bluestar and Salisbury Reds.

All routes connect the station with Southampton and the following destinations:

- 6 to Lyndhurst and Lymington
- 8 to Marchwood and Hythe
- 11 to West Totton
- 12 to Calmore
- X7/R to Salisbury.

Additional bus services stop in the town centre nearby.

== Location ==
Totton railway station is located approximately a third of a mile away from the town centre of Totton, resulting in a location isolated and overlooked from the rest of the town. In the summer of 2015, improvements were made across the town and at the station to link the station up with the rest of the town by providing better quality lighting and roads and directional signage towards the station in the town centre.

== Community Station Adoption ==
Totton station has been adopted by the community group Totton Community Rail, under the Community Rail Network station adoption scheme, in partnership with South Western Railway. The group works to improve the station environment and run community projects, such as the new mural installed in October 2022.
