= Hythe, Hampshire =

Town in Hampshire, England

Coordinates: 50°52′08″N 1°23′56″W

Hythe
- Town
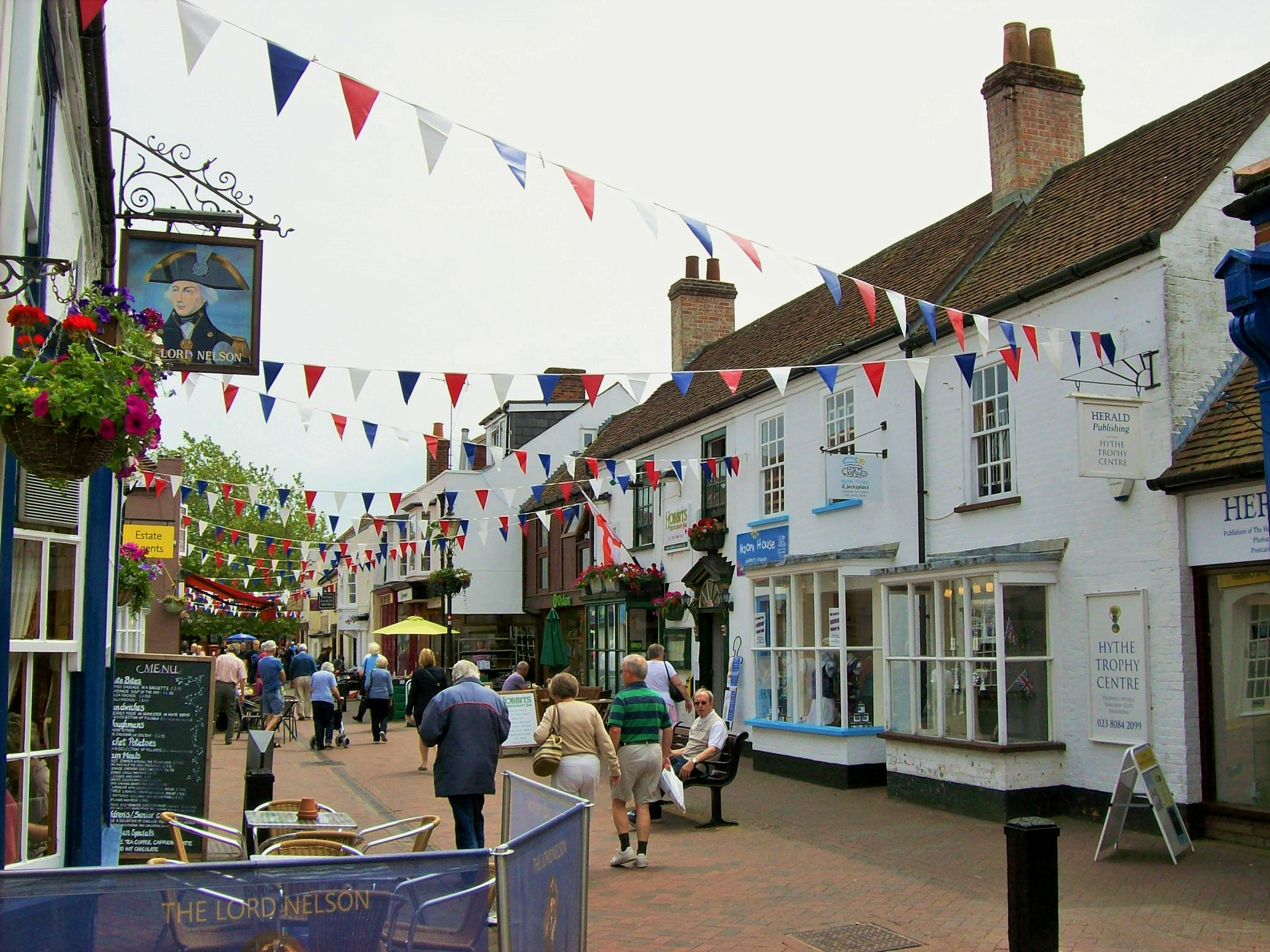
- High Street, Hythe, Hampshire

- Location within Hampshire
- Population: 20,526
- OS grid reference: SU421076
- Civil parish: Hythe and Dibden
- District: New Forest
- Shire county: Hampshire
- Region: South East
- Country: England
- Sovereign state: United Kingdom
- Post town: SOUTHAMPTON
- Postcode district: SO45
- Dialling code: 023
- Police: Hampshire and Isle of Wight
- Fire: Hampshire and Isle of Wight
- Ambulance: South Central
- UK Parliament: New Forest East
- Website: Hythe and Dibden Parish Council

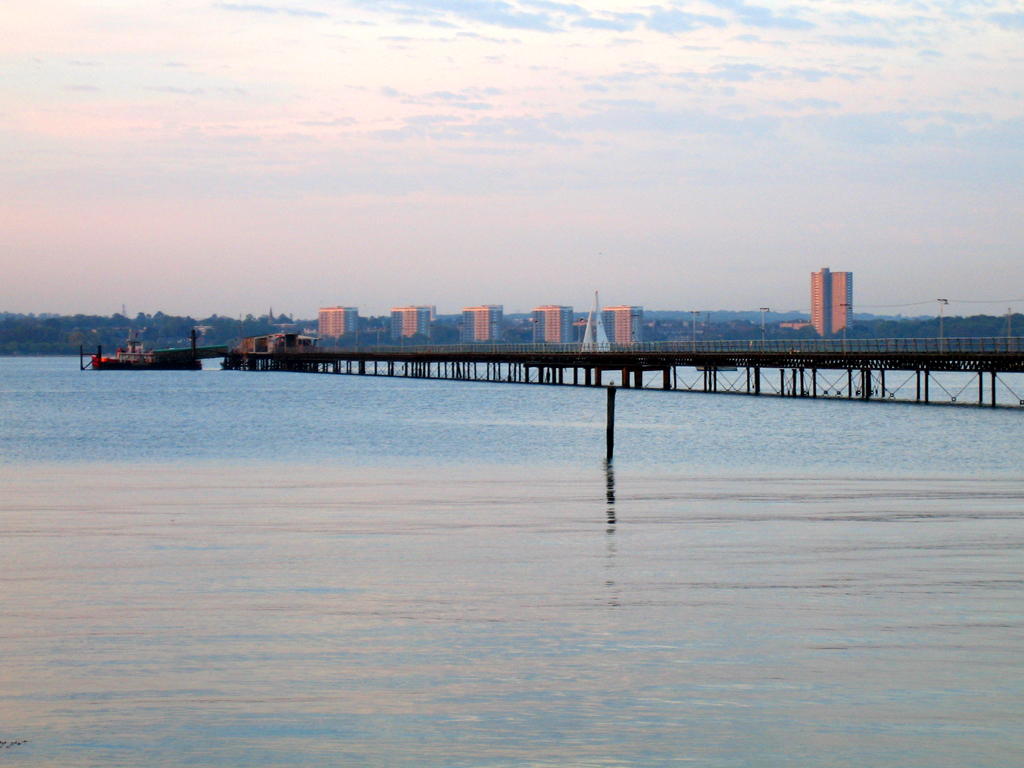
Hythe pier

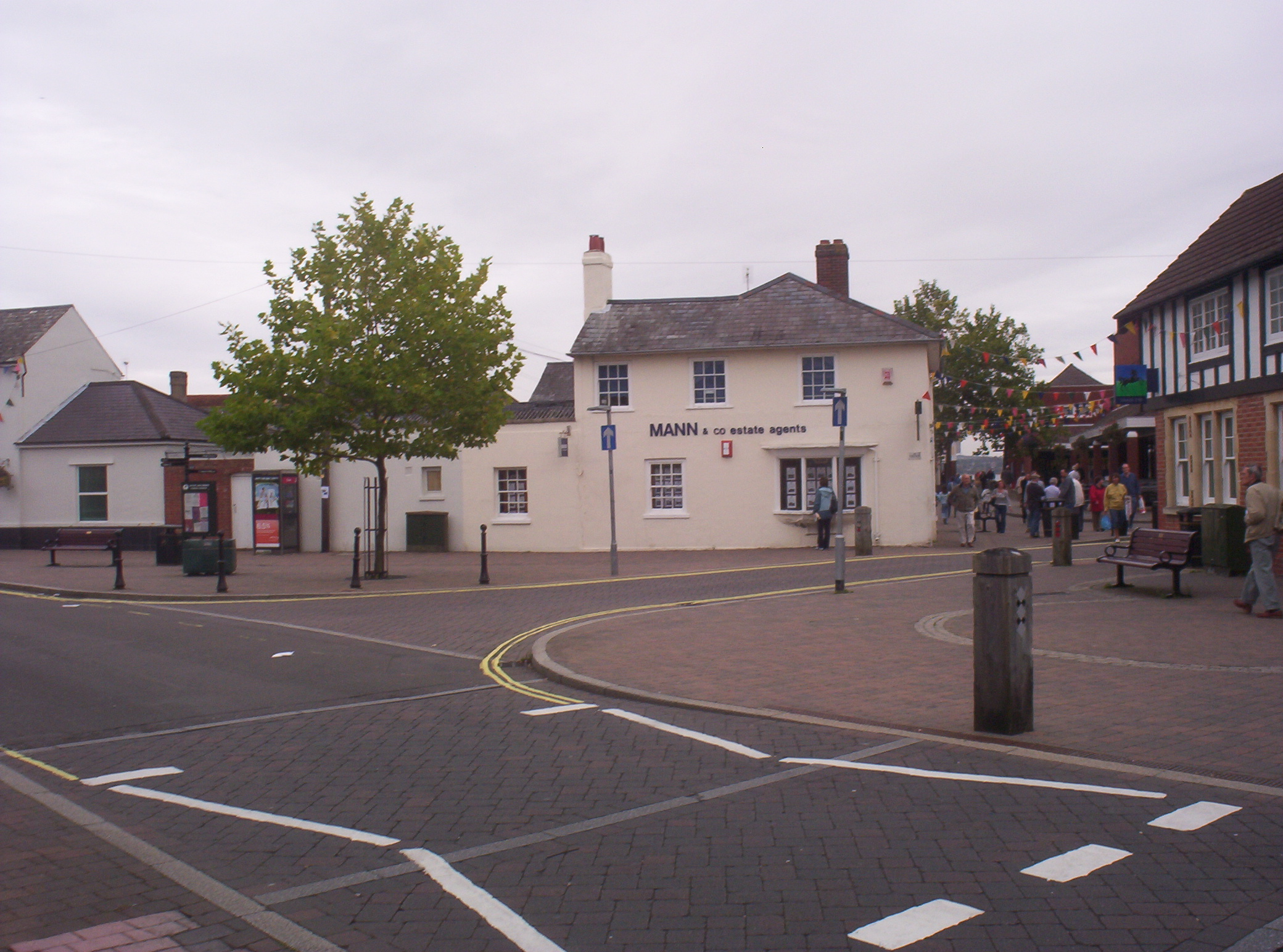
The Marsh

Hythe (/haɪð/) is a town in Hampshire, England. It is located by the shore of Southampton Water, previously connected to Southampton by ferry service. Hythe has a shopping area, a pier, and a marina for yachts.

== History ==
The name Hythe means landing-place or haven. Hythe is recorded in a Parliamentary roll from 1293. The Hythe ferry ("Hitheferye") to Southampton is marked on a map by Christopher Saxton of 1575, and on a map by John Harrison in 1788. Hythe was part of the parish of Fawley, although it became a separate ecclesiastical parish in 1841. The current church, of Saint John the Baptist, was erected in 1874. It is of red brick with Bath Stone dressings. The design was by John Oldrid Scott and replaced an earlier church dating from 1823. There were at one time stocks in the village.

The Hampshire Advertiser, 23 Dec 1837, reports the death of John Richards of Hythe (1764-1837) and notes 'the father of the deceased founded the neat little village of Hythe: previous to his time there was no building there of greater pretensions than the huts of a few fishermen. The elder Mr Richards, when he established a shipbuilding yard at Heath (as it was then called) built houses for his workmen and the village soon sprang up.'

At the beginning of the 20th century, Hythe was a "little fishing village"; with an hourly steamboat service to Southampton, and with the clubhouse of Hythe Yacht Club at the end of the pier. Hythe remained part of the civil parish of Fawley until 1913, when it became part of the parish of Dibden.

Thanks in part to the British Power Boat Company and its excellent access to the English Channel, during World War II Hythe was used as a port for the "little ships" of the Royal Navy, the Motor Torpedo Boats and the RAF Air/Sea Rescue Boats. In 1960, The Hovercraft Development Company and Sir Christopher Cockerell, its founder, moved to Hythe. There was also a small Royal Air Force base in Hythe known as RAF Hythe. Until its closure in September 2006 it was used by the United States Army to service and maintain watercraft. Part of the site is now used by the local Air Training Corps squadron.

Hythe was a village up to the 1950s, but the expansion of Fawley Refinery led to a demand for more houses for workers, and Hythe and Dibden Purlieu were allowed to expand into a small town. In 1983, following the growth of Hythe, the parish of Dibden was renamed to Hythe and Dibden, to reflect the importance of Hythe as a new focal point of the Parish. Construction of Hythe Marina began in 1985.

The town was previously served by the Hythe railway station on the Totton, Hythe and Fawley Light Railway. The station opened in 1925 and closed to passengers in 1966.

== Geography ==
Hythe has a small shopping area clustered around the High Street, which includes two supermarkets (Waitrose and Lidl), a public library, several charity shops, and small independent shops. The Hythe Pier, Railway and Ferry previously operated across Southampton Water to Southampton before the ferry's closure in 2024, but still maintains the oldest functional pier train in the world.

Hythe's position makes it a good vantage point for viewing ocean liners arriving and departing at the port of Southampton, which attracts ship-watchers to the area. Hythe has a marina, at which a large number of yachts and boats are moored. Large and expensive houses are situated around the marina, overlooking the waterside.

Ewart Recreation Ground on Jones Lane in Hythe is home to Hythe and Dibden Cricket Club. The club was formed in 1948 with the amalgamation of The Hythe Club and The Dibden Purlieu Club. The Hythe club was formed in 1860.

Hythe was home to the US Army between 1968 and 2006 at RAF Hythe. Following its closure, RAF Hythe was bought by the South East England Development Agency (SEEDA), who turned the site into a marine business park, Hythe Marine Park. Every year, usually around August, the marina hosts the RNLI (Royal National Lifeboat Institution) Great Waterside Raft Race, where teams race rafts in the Solent Estuary to raise money in support of the nearby Calshot RNLI station.

== British Power Boat Company ==
The British Power Boat Company, which manufactured racing boats and later military patrol boats, was formed on 30 September 1927 when Hubert Scott-Paine bought and renamed Hythe's shipyard, with the intention of transforming it into one of the most modern mass production boat building yards in the country. Together with his chief designer, Fred Cooper, the company produced many racing boats which won numerous awards around Europe, including Miss England II and Miss Britain III.

From 1930 the British Power Boat Company supplied seaplane tenders to the Air Ministry, commencing with RAF200, a 37 feet (11 m)-footer. In 1931 the Royal Air Force seconded T. E. Lawrence – better known as "Lawrence of Arabia" – in his service name of T. E. Shaw, to liaise with Scott-Paine on the design, trials and operations of the boat. Lawrence lodged in the village from 1931 to 1932, in Myrtle Cottage at the junction of St John Street and Shore Road. The tenders were initially powered by twin 100bhp Meadows petrol engines giving a maximum speed of 29 knots, with some later versions fitted with Perkins S6M diesels.

== Thermionic Products and RACAL Recorders ==
Thermionic Products, acquired by RACAL Electronics plc to become RACAL Recorders, was established in Hythe in the 1950s, moving to a large facility at the nearby Hardley Industrial Estate. RACAL Recorders produced a wide range of specialist magnetic tape recorders for recording multiple channels of voice, as used by air traffic control and the emergency services, and also instrumentation recorders. The company was awarded a number of patents. RACAL Recorders won several Queen's Awards for innovation and export.

== Sport and leisure ==
Hythe has a non-League football club Hythe & Dibden FC, which plays at Clayfields Sports Ground, as well as Southern Premier League cricket club Hythe & Dibden Cricket Club.

Not far away is Applemore Recreation Centre, near Applemore College, where the New Forest District Council supplies facilities, which include swimming, archery, basketball, tennis, squash and more.

Hythe's proximity to Southampton Water makes water sports easily accessible, via Hythe Marina, Hythe Marina's slipway or Hythe Sailing Club. The slipway is used for the annual RNLI Raft Race.

Hythe Sea Scouts also have good access to the water – their hut adjacent to Hythe Sailing Club. As a Royal Navy recognised group, the group has acquired a variety of kayaks, canoes and dinghies through funding. The building is currently undergoing maintenance due to erosion of the coastline putting the group at threat of being 'washed away'. A significant funding campaign, led by Chris Godfrey, raised over £80,000 to secure the ground beneath the scout hut.

== Notable residents ==
- Christopher Cockerell, invented the hovercraft, lived and died in Hythe
- T. E. Lawrence, British archaeologist, army officer, diplomat, and writer lived in the area as a child, before returning to Hythe between 1931 and 1932
- William Scammell, English poet, critic and biographer of Keith Douglas, was born in Hythe in 1939
- David Ellery, TV producer, presenter and author
- Bruce Parry, adventurer and TV presenter of shows such as Amazon with Bruce Parry
- Rik Young (born 1978), actor and dancer, grew up in Hythe
