= Applemore College =

Secondary school in Hampshire, England

Location
- Roman Road; Dibden Purlieu; Southampton, Hampshire, SO45 4RQ; England; 50.862°N 1.432°W

Information
- Type: Foundation comprehensive school
- Motto: Ambitious for all
- Established: 1969
- Local authority: Hampshire
- Department for Education URN: 116504 Tables
- Ofsted: Reports
- Chair: Chris Lund
- Headteacher: Clare Williams
- Gender: Coeducational
- Age: 11 to 16
- Enrolment: 670
- Houses: Holmsley; Hurn; Ibsley; Sopley; Beaulieu
- Website: www.applemore.hants.uk

Applemore College is a secondary school in Hampshire, England, situated in the village of Dibden Purlieu on the edge of the New Forest. It offers education to over 600 students between the ages of 11 and 16 and has specialist subject status for the teaching of Technology.

The college was built in 1969 as a comprehensive co-educational school. Clare Williams was the headteacher as of 2023.
