= Southampton Water =

Tidal estuary in England

Coordinates: 50°51′22″N 1°20′51″W

Designations

Ramsar Wetland
- Official name: Solent and Southampton Water
- Designated: 1 October 1998
- Reference no.: 965

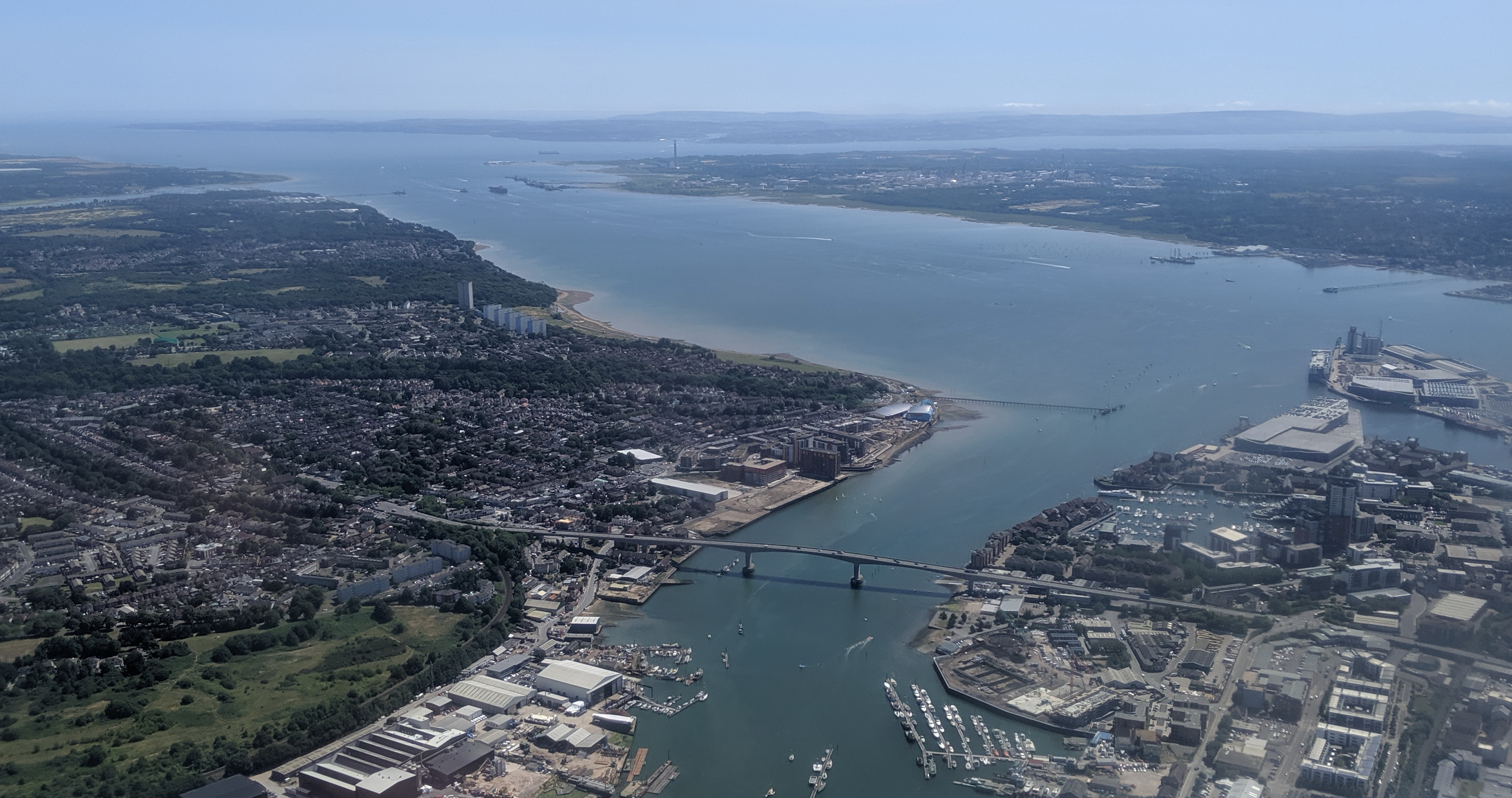
The river Itchen (lower centre) flowing into Southampton Water

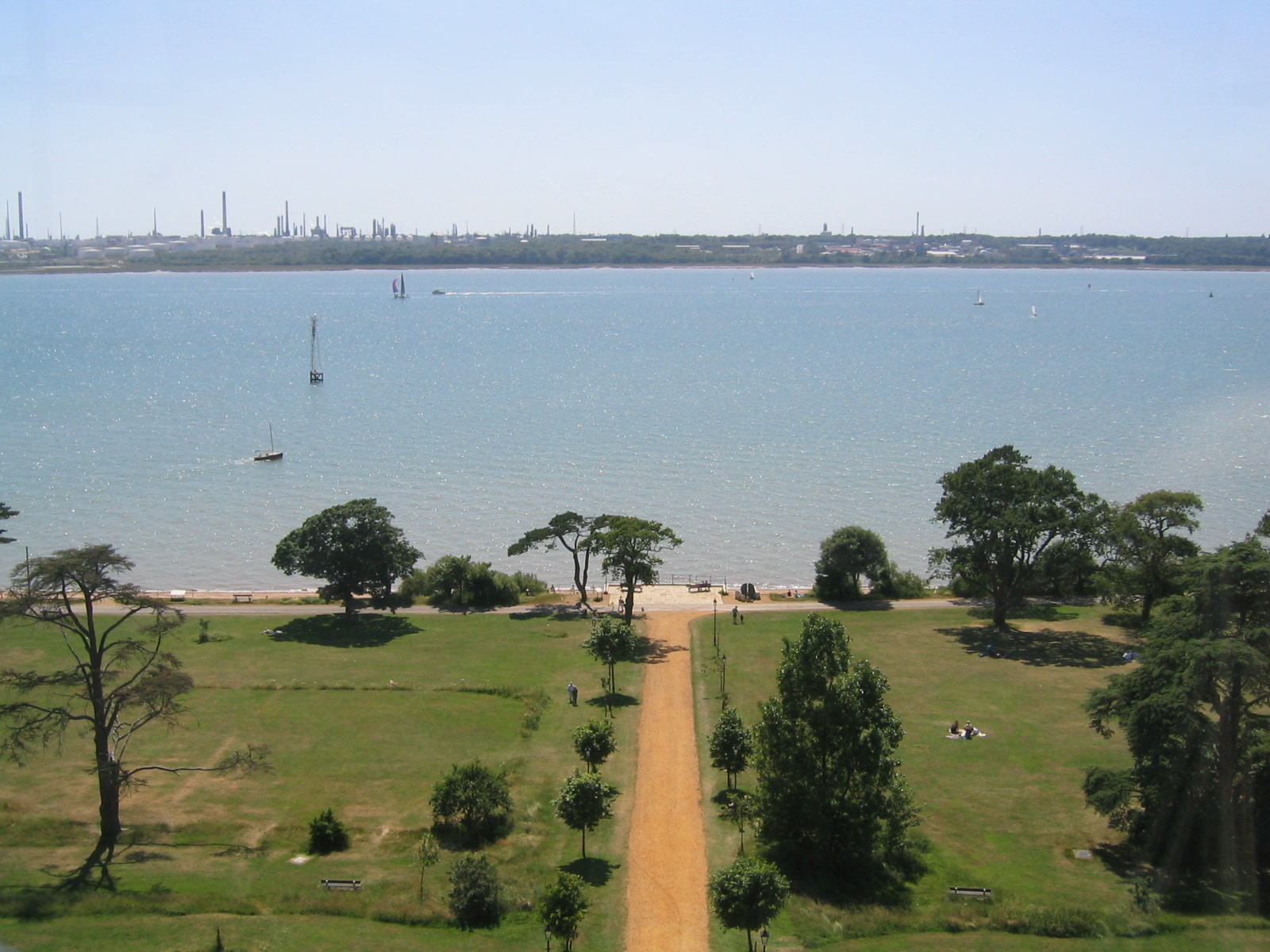
Fawley oil refinery from Netley Hospital

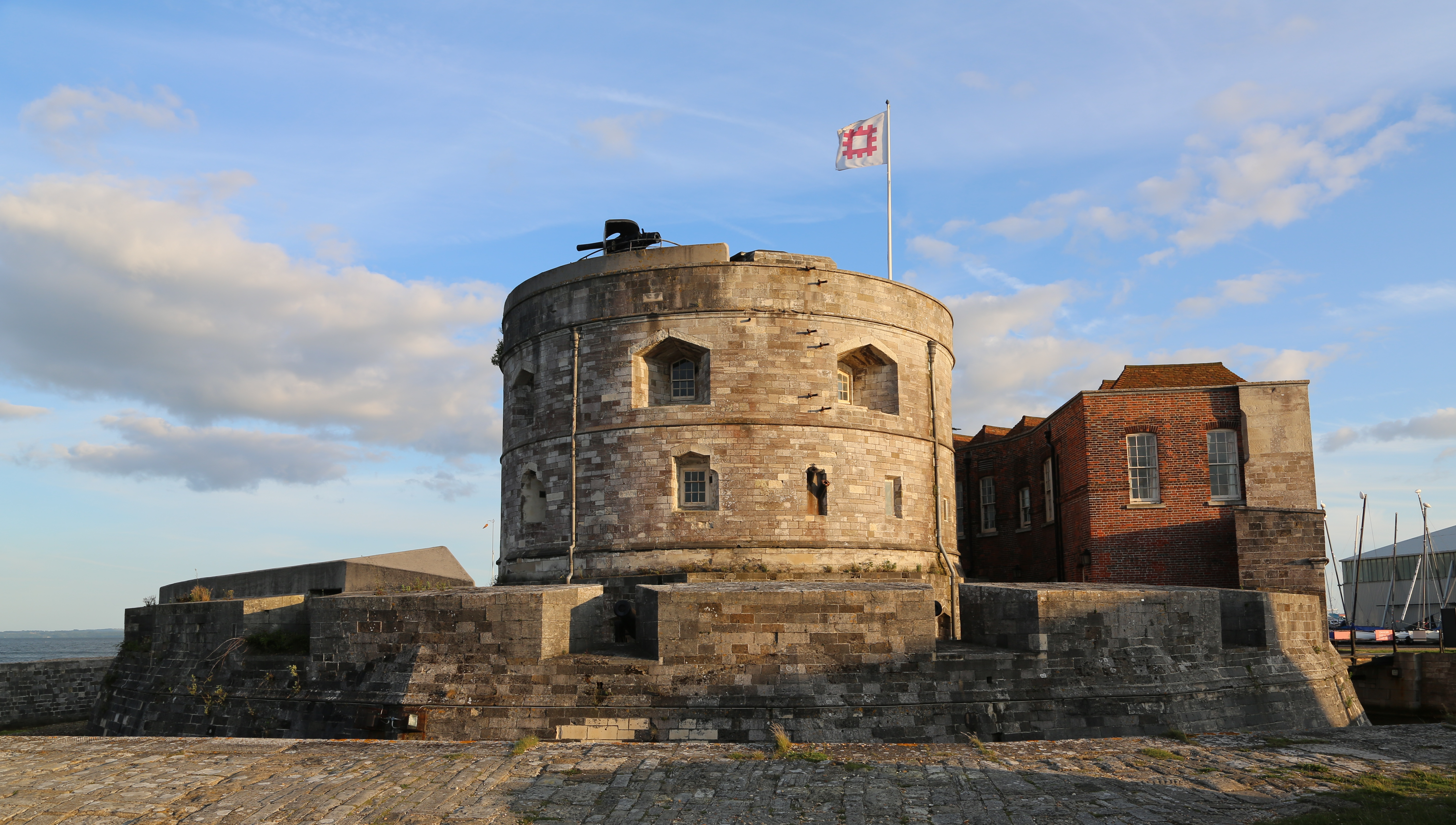
Calshot Castle protects the mouth of Southampton Water.

Southampton Water is a tidal estuary north of the Solent and the Isle of Wight in England. The city of Southampton lies at its most northerly point, where the estuaries of the River Test and River Itchen meet. Along its salt marsh-fringed western shores lie the New Forest villages of Dibden, Hythe and Fawley, and the Fawley Refinery. On the slightly steeper eastern shore are the Southampton suburb of Weston, the villages of Netley and Hamble-le-Rice, and the Royal Victoria Country Park. To the south, Southampton Water enters the Solent between Calshot Spit and Hill Head.

Southampton Water is an estuary with major potential for land use conflicts. An area of urban development (the Waterside) runs in the narrow band of land between Southampton Water and the New Forest National Park. Villages such as Marchwood, Hythe, Dibden Purlieu, Holbury and Fawley have all experienced significant growth.

== Geography ==
Geographically, Southampton Water is classified as a ria, or drowned valley, of the English Channel. It was formed by the rivers Test, Itchen and Hamble which flow into it, and became an inlet of the sea at the end of the last ice age when sea levels rose, flooding many valleys in the south of England. In particular, it is likely that Southampton Water formed partly due to the submerging of the River Solent which previously flowed through the area, and of which the River Test, River Itchen and River Medina are thought to be tributaries.

== Navigation ==
With the notable exception of the oil terminals serving Fawley Refinery, most of the dock facilities of the Port of Southampton lie upstream of the top of Southampton Water, on the estuaries of the River Test and, to a lesser extent, the River Itchen. However the development of the port, particularly as a port handling very large vessels, depended partly on certain geographical features of Southampton Water, many of which in any case extend to the upstream estuaries. Southampton Water's depth, even in its undeveloped state, was generous; this depth of water has been increased over the years with comparative ease since the soft silt of the river-bed allows for easy dredging. An additional factor is the phenomenon of the "double tide", which results in unusually prolonged periods of high water. This greatly facilitates the movements of very large ships.

Together with the Solent, Southampton Water is world-renowned for yachting. It served as one of the sailing and motorboating venues for the 1908 Summer Olympics.

== Crossings ==
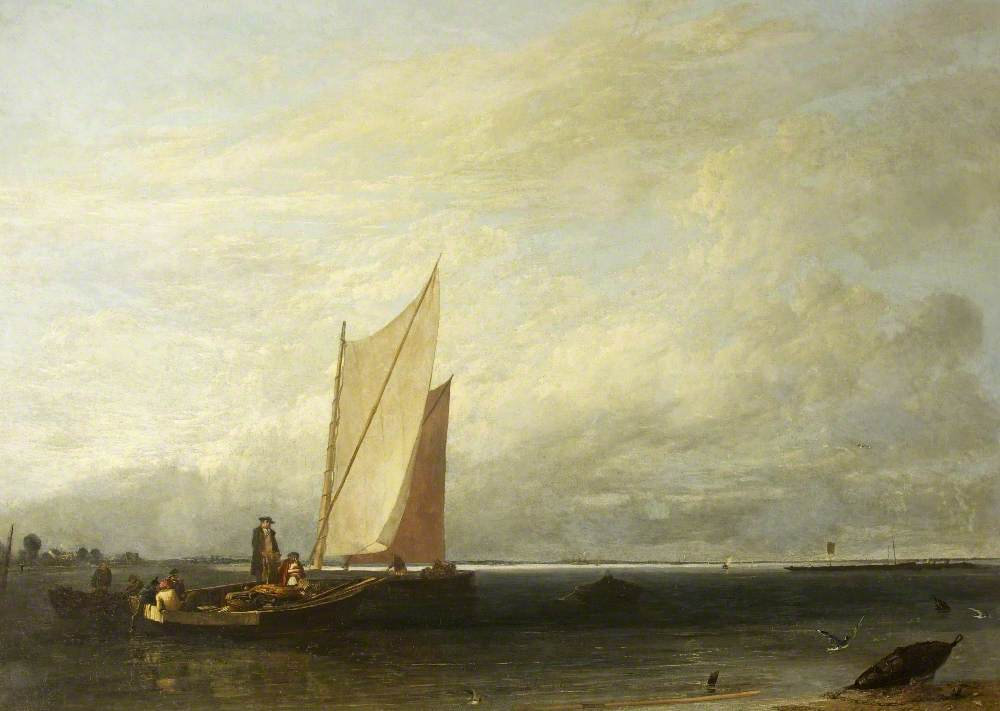
View of Southampton Water by Augustus Wall Callcott, 1815

There are no fixed transport crossings of Southampton Water or the estuary of the River Test south of the bridges that link Redbridge and Totton. The Hythe Ferry, along with its associated pier and pier railway, provides a passenger service between Town Quay in Southampton and Hythe, avoiding a 10 miles (16 km) alternative road journey. The Itchen Bridge spans the estuary of the River Itchen just upstream of the point where it flows into Southampton Water.

Fawley Tunnel carries electrical cables in a 3-metre (9.8 ft) diameter tunnel 2-mile (3.2 km) between Fawley Power Station and Chilling near Warsash.

== Dibden Bay ==
Between Hythe and Marchwood, an area of reclaimed land – Dibden Bay – was the site of a proposed port expansion by Associated British Ports. This was argued to be essential for the continued economic development of the Port of Southampton but the development was vigorously opposed by conservation groups. The intertidal marshlands of Dibden Bay have international significance (Ramsar status).

The planning enquiry eventually rejected the application from Associated British Ports recommending that the environmental value of the site could not be overruled when there were alternative sites for port expansion in southern England which had not yet been fully explored. The government accepted the recommendations of the planning inspector in April 2005.

In July 2009, Associated British Ports launched a consultation on a 20-year masterplan for Southampton port. It sets out plans for future growth: "In identifying the Dibden reclaim as the only possible location for port expansion, ABP is fully aware of the nature conservation value of the site and the adjoining foreshore… Our demand forecasts indicate that expansion into the Dibden reclaim will become necessary between 2021 and 2027".

== Invasive species ==
Crepidula fornicata sea snails are present in Southampton Water. Austrominius modestus barnacles were first observed in Southampton Water in the late 1940s.

=== Introduced species ===
In 1925 American hard-shelled clams were introduced into the River Test in an area warmed by cooling water discharge of Southampton Power Station in an attempt to breed them to allow them to be used as eel bait. Since their introduction the clams have spread through Southampton Water and into Portsmouth Harbour and Langstone Harbour.
