= Fawley Refinery =

Oil refinery in Hampshire, England

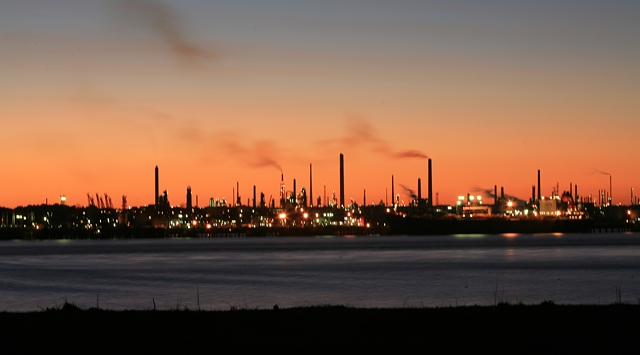

- Fawley Refinery in Hampshire
- Location: Fawley, Hampshire, UK; 50.833°N 1.365°W

Refinery details
- Owner: Esso
- Opened: 1921
- Capacity: 270,000 barrels per day (43,000 m^{3}/d)
- No. of employees: >2,500 (including contractors)
- No. of oil tanks: 330

Fawley Refinery is an oil refinery located at Fawley, Hampshire, England. The refinery is owned by Esso Petroleum Company Limited, a subsidiary of Exxon Mobil Corporation, which acquired the site in 1925. Situated on Southampton Water, it was rebuilt and extended in 1951 and is now the largest oil refinery in the United Kingdom, and one of the most complex refineries in Europe. With a capacity of 270,000 barrels (43,000 m^{3}) per day, Fawley provides 20 per cent of the UK's refinery capacity. Over 2,500 people are employed at the site.

== History ==
The refinery was established in 1921 by the Atlantic, Gulf and West Indies Oil Company on 270 hectares (670 acres) of land. The site was chosen because a large amount of land was available for development, and the area was not heavily populated, and because of the position on Southampton Water. This provided access to the large amount of water used in the refining process, and also made it possible for crude oil to be brought to the site in ocean tankers by sea. Proximity to Southampton was also a factor, as at the outset much of the plant's output was used to supply liners using Southampton Docks. Atlantic, Gulf and West Indies were bought out by British-Mexican Petroleum in 1923, and they, in turn, were taken over by the Anglo-American Oil Company in 1925, which was the British affiliate of Esso. In 1939 capacity was around 600,000 tonnes of crude oil per annum (approximately 12,000 barrels [1,900 m^{3}] per day) which met just 6.7% of UK demand. Refining ceased during World War II, when most refined oil for the UK was imported, and Fawley was used as a storage depot.

In 1949 Esso embarked on the construction of a new refinery, and a further 1,200 hectares (3,000 acres) of land were acquired. The first stage of this expansion, which came on-stream in 1951, consisted of primary distillation units, a catalytic cracker and numerous treating units. The refinery was opened by British prime minister Clement Attlee on 14 September 1951. It had an initial estimated capacity of 157,000 barrels (25,000 m^{3}) per day, or around one third of UK demand at that time. The chemical plant was created in 1958. Additional refining capacity was added, and Fawley's capacity reached around 19,500,000 tonnes of crude oil per annum in 1973 (approximately 400,000 barrels [64,000 m^{3}] per day), and has since decreased, partly because of reduced demand for oil.

== Esso refinery ==
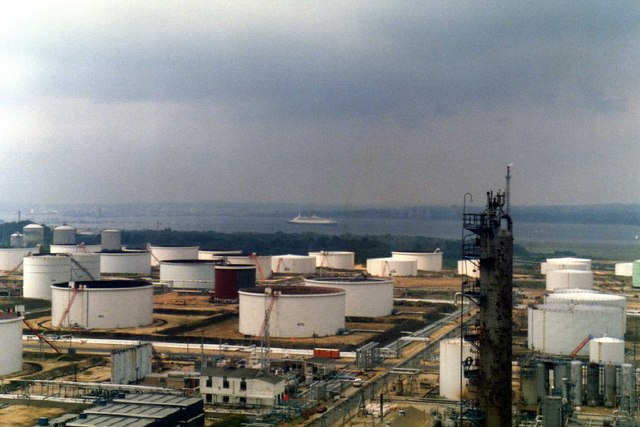
Oil storage tanks at Fawley

Fawley refinery processes around 270,000 barrels (43,000 m^{3}) of crude oil a day and provides 20 per cent of the UK's refinery capacity. Crude oil is transported by sea in tankers to the refinery's one-mile-long (1,600 m) marine terminal, which handles around 2,000 ship movements and 22 million tonnes of crude oil and other products every year. The crude oil is pumped into storage tanks before being processed.

The crude oil is distilled into different fractions, with other complex processes being performed to produce a full range of products, that includes propane and butane (LPG), petrol, jet fuel, diesel, marine fuels, heating oil, lubricant basestocks and fuel oil. Major process units include three atmospheric and three vacuum distillation units (although one atmospheric and one vacuum distillation unit was shut down in 2012), a fluid catalytic cracking unit, a resid finer, a polymerization plant, two powerformers, six hydrofiners (a new one was brought online in 2013), two sulphur extraction units, a lubricating oil manufacturing complex, an isomerization unit and a bitumen plant (which was shut down in 2009). In addition to this, the refinery is also home to the largest refrigerated LPG storage facility in Northern Europe.

About 5% of Fawley's production is distributed by rail or road, 25% by sea and 70% by pipelines. The refinery at Fawley also supplies feedstock to the adjacent chemical plant. Rail facilities at Fawley comprise LPG loading, chlorine facilities, crude offloading, a chemical facilities building, caustic facilities, butyl rubber, bitumen, gas oil and a coal road. The 10-mile-long (16 km) Fawley branch line is connected to the South West Main Line via an east-facing connection to the west of Totton station.

== Chemical plant ==
The site houses a chemical facility operated by ExxonMobil and Nalco.

The ExxonMobil chemical plant produces approximately 750,000 tonnes of chemical products every year. The initial stage for many of the chemical products was the steam cracker (shut and dismantled in 2013), which took a feedstock of heavy naphtha or gas oil from the refinery to produce basic chemical building blocks: ethylene, propene and butene. This plant is now demolished, with ethylene shipped directly in from a supplier; the propene and butene streams from the petroleum side of the refinery are used as feedstocks, mainly for the higher olefins plant and the isobutylene plant. Butene is stored in seven large pressurised spheres – known as the seven sisters – that are a prominent feature of the Fawley site.

The higher olefins plant is the largest chemical plant at Fawley. The 14 higher olefins manufactured at Fawley are shipped to other chemical plants in Europe for further processing. They are used in the manufacture of plasticizers – the component in plastics which makes them flexible – and also in the manufacture of performance fluids.

The two key chemical products produced at Fawley are halobutyl rubber and methyl ethyl ketone:

- Halobutyl rubber is the one polymer product made at Fawley. It is used to line tyres. The isobutylene feedstock for the polymers plant comes from the isobutylene plant. The solid halobutyl rubber is formed into bales and packed into crates in which it is shipped to customers around the world. The majority of tyres manufactured in Europe contain some Fawley halobutyl rubber.
- MEK (methyl ethyl ketone) is a solvent used in paints and adhesives. Residue from the isobutylene plant is used in the manufacture of MEK.

== Oil terminal ==
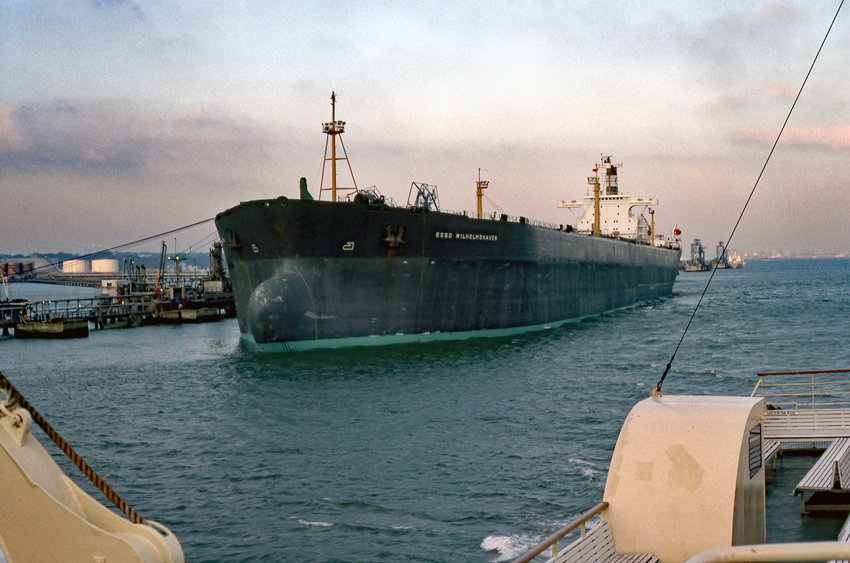
VLCC Esso Wilhelmshaven at the Fawley Refinery oil terminal

The refinery can handle VLCCs up to 244,000 tonnes displacement, with a length overall up to 368 m (1,207 ft) It has nine berths, 5 oceangoing berths with depths from 10.2 m (33 ft) to 14.9 m (49 ft), and 4 for coastal vessels with depths in the 5–6 m (16–20 ft) range.

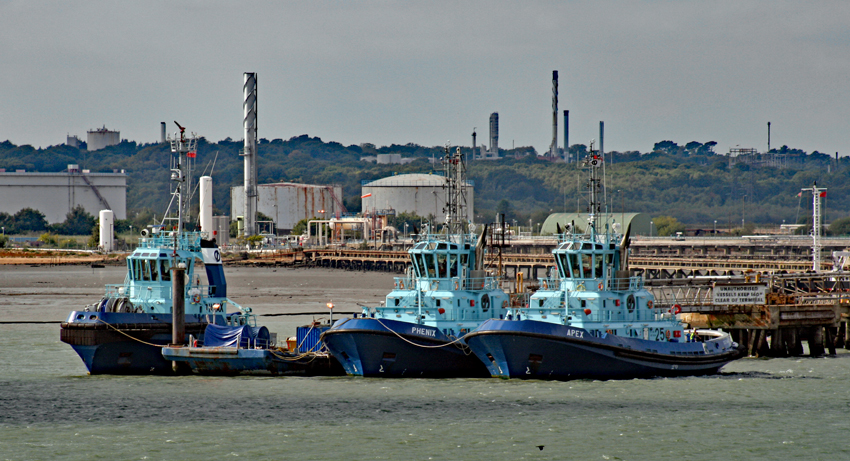
Fire fighting tugs at Fawley

A fleet of three tugs, Tenax, Phenix and Apex operated by Solent Towage, is based at the terminal. They are designed specifically for oil terminal duties with fire fighting capabilities, rescue equipment and oil spill boom equipment.

== Other facilities ==
In addition to the Esso refinery and chemicals plant, several associated industrial facilities were built in the Fawley area. These were attracted to the Esso facility either as a provider of feedstock or to provide services to other plants. The facilities built in the post-war period were as follows.

Industrial Plant on the west side of Southampton Water
| Plant | Area, ha | Commissioned |
|---|---|---|
| Fawley refinery | 506 | 1951 |
| Marchwood power station | 60 | 1955 |
| International Synthetic Rubber | 22 | 1958 |
| Monsanto Chemicals | 8 | 1958 |
| Fawley power station | 71 | 1959 |
| Union Carbide | 10 | 1960 |
| Air Products | 1.6 | 1961 |
| Hythe Gasworks | 6 | 1964 |

Marchwood and Fawley Power Stations were both supplied with heavy fuel oil from the refinery. Marchwood Power Station was fed by an 11.3 km (7.0 mi) pipeline which delivered oil to four storage tanks holding 26,000 tonnes. Fawley power station was supplied via two 10 in (25 cm) diameter, 3.2 km (2.0 mi) long, pipelines which discharged into storage tanks with a capacity of 24,000 tonnes.

Hythe gas works comprised six continuous catalytic reforming plants. These delivered up to 3.5 million m^{3} per day of town gas. The works were fed with refinery gas and naphtha feedstock via pipelines from the refinery. Air Products supplied nitrogen by pipeline for purging and start-up. Output from the works was fed to the gas grid by a 17 km (11 mi), 20 in (51 cm) diameter pipeline to Ower; and a 24 km (15 mi), 24 in (61 cm) diameter pipeline to Sopley. Gas was also supplied by undersea pipelines to the Isle of Wight.

International Synthetic Rubber manufactured rubber. The feedstock for the plant was butadiene supplied via pipeline from Esso Chemicals and styrene originally obtained from BP Grangemouth refinery. In 1969 the company commissioned a styrene monomer plant at Hythe.

Union Carbide was supplied with ethylene from the Esso plant. Union Carbide manufactured anti-freeze, brake fluids, solvents, detergents, and other chemical compounds.

Monsanto manufactured polyethylene pellets using ethylene from the Esso plant which was delivered via pipeline.

Air Products produced a range of gases. Nitrogen was supplied to the refinery, Hythe gas works, and other plant on the site.

Ethylene was also supplied from Esso Chemicals Fawley to ICI Severnside via a 6 in (15 cm) diameter cross country pipeline.

== Safety record ==
Fawley refinery has been the scene of a number of fires and explosions.

In 1935, a major oil tank blaze caused a fire that lasted many days.

In 1969, a major fire broke out in the refinery causing damage to large parts of it.

In July 2007, the BBC reported a fire in the steam generating plant of the refinery with no casualties. It caused a major part of the refinery to be shut down for a few days.

In 2008, a sailor from Honduras died after a fuel pipe fell from a refinery jib due to a corroded connecting bolt. The pipe collapsed on to the deck of the oil tanker MT Castillo de Monterreal. Esso and Austin & McLean were charged with breaching the Health and Safety Act for the accident, and were fined £100,000.

On 20 June 2010, around 20 barrels of vacuum gas oil leaked into Southampton Water as a ship was unloaded. Esso was later fined £10,000 for the incident.

In 2011, an accident at the refinery caused the death of one of its workers.

== See also ==
- Fawley Power Station
