= Winsor, Hampshire =

Village in Hampshire, England

Coordinates: 50.9220°N 1.550832°W

Winsor
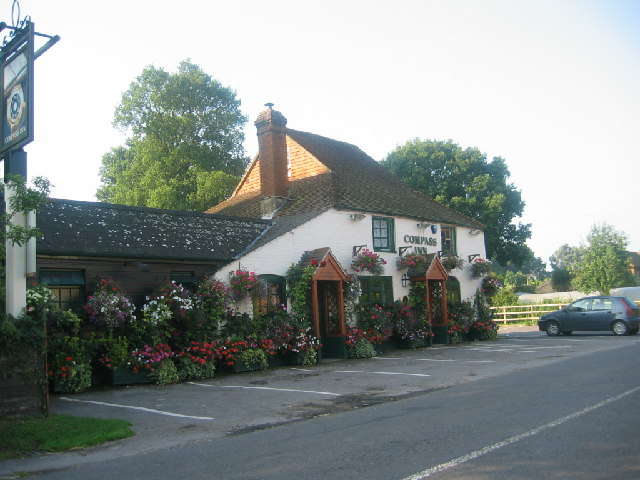
- Compass Inn, Winsor

- Location within Hampshire
- OS grid reference: SU315143
- Civil parish: Copythorne
- District: New Forest
- Shire county: Hampshire
- Region: South East
- Country: England
- Sovereign state: United Kingdom
- Post town: SOUTHAMPTON
- Postcode district: SO40
- Dialling code: 023
- Police: Hampshire and Isle of Wight
- Fire: Hampshire and Isle of Wight
- Ambulance: South Central
- UK Parliament: New Forest East

Winsor is a village in the civil parish of Copythorne, in Hampshire, England. It is situated within the boundaries of the New Forest National Park. Surrounding villages are Copythorne to the west, Netley Marsh to the southeast, and Bartley to the south west.

== History ==
Winsor is first recorded as Windesore in 1167, and Windlesore in 1222. The name apparently derives from "windels-ora" meaning "winch on a bank", an etymology shared with Windsor. In the 13th century there was an estate at Winsor and at nearby Cadnam which belonged to the nuns of Amesbury, who in 1286 obtained a grant of free warren in both estates. About the same time a second estate at Winsor was held by the Abbot of Netley, which probably formed a part of the abbot's estate at Totton. Some time after the Dissolution these lands passed to the Paulets, becoming part of the Paultons estate. A third manor at Winsor is mentioned in the 14th century when it formed part of the main manor of Eling. It was in the hands of the Bishop of Winchester in 1385, when it was granted with the manor of Eling to Winchester College.
