= Colbury =

Village in Hampshire, England

Coordinates: 50.896°N 1.506°W

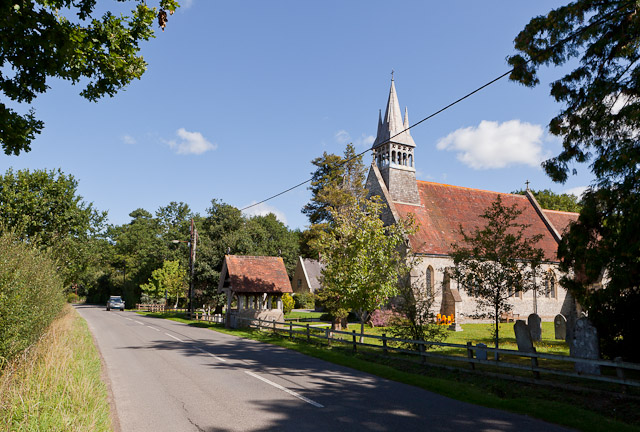
- Colbury

- Location within Hampshire
- OS grid reference: SU348108
- Civil parish: Ashurst and Colbury
- District: New Forest
- Shire county: Hampshire
- Region: South East
- Country: England
- Sovereign state: United Kingdom
- Post town: SOUTHAMPTON
- Postcode district: SO40
- Dialling code: 023
- Police: Hampshire and Isle of Wight
- Fire: Hampshire and Isle of Wight
- Ambulance: South Central
- UK Parliament: New Forest East

Colbury is a small village in the civil parish of Ashurst and Colbury, in the New Forest district, in the county of Hampshire, England. The village lies along Deerleap Lane, near the modern village of Ashurst, in the New Forest National Park.

== History ==
The name Colbury is derived from Middle English for "Cola's manor", and near Colbury is an estate called Langley which was held by "Cola the Hunter" in the Domesday Book of 1086. The manor of Colbury was given to the Abbot of Beaulieu by Robert de Punchardon sometime in the 13th century. A grant of free warren in the manor was made in 1359–60 to the Abbot and convent of Beaulieu. Successive abbots remained in possession of the manor until the dissolution of the abbey in April 1538, when it passed to the Crown. It was purchased in 1544 by John Mill and his son John. The elder John died in 1551 and the younger John was succeeded by his son Lewknor. He died in November 1587, and his son Lewknor died in the following month, leaving John his brother and heir. John was created a baronet in 1619, and the manor descended with the Mill Baronets until the death of the last baronet in 1835.

The site of the Colbury Manor House is about a mile to the northeast of Colbury village, close to the village of Eling. The house which is now there is modern, and no trace of ancient buildings survive.

Colbury was for centuries a tithing in Eling parish. Its population in 1870 was 341 people. The church in Colbury, called Christ Church, was built in 1870 by Benjamin Ferrey.

The civil parish of Colbury was one of the parishes created out of the ancient parish of Eling on 30 September 1894. Colbury parish was abolished on 1 October 1934 when 4722 acres were transferred to the parish of Denny Lodge and 750 acres were transferred to Eling. In 1931 the parish had a population of 1247. The modern parish of Ashurst and Colbury was created in 1985, but administers a much smaller area than the old Colbury parish.

The village has a hall built in 1928 as a memorial to the First World War.
