= Testwood School =

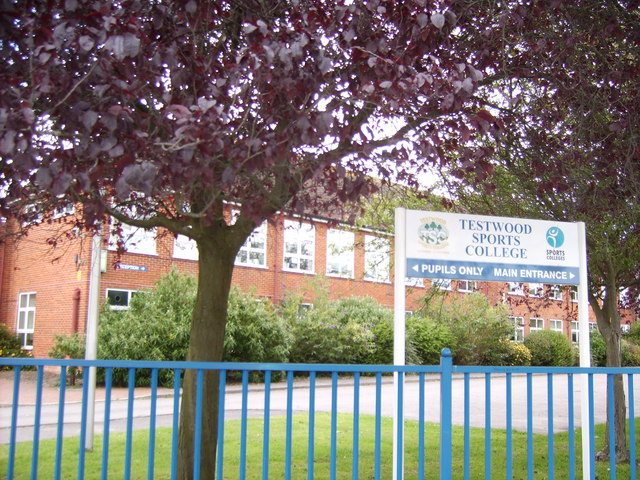

Location
- Testwood Lane; Totton; Southampton, Hampshire, SO40 3ZW; 50.925706°N 1.493250°W

Information
- Type: Academy
- Motto: Learning to Succeed
- Local authority: Hampshire
- Department for Education URN: 137315 Tables
- Ofsted: Reports
- Headteacher: Tim Webber
- Gender: Mixed
- Age: 11 to 16
- Enrolment: 694 (in 2015)
- Website: http://www.testwood.hants.sch.uk/

Testwood School (formerly Testwood Sports College) is a secondary school with academy status located in the town of Totton and Eling, England. The school was built in the late 1930s but its opening was delayed by World War II. The school takes pupils between 11 and 16, and holds adult skills classes after school hours.

== History ==
Testwood School opened in 1946 as a secondary school, and became a comprehensive school in 1969. The school is formed of the original building alongside other extensions added through the years. Major extensions were added in recent years including the Sports Hall, and an extension to the science block and library in 1997. A further extension containing more science laboratories and ICT rooms opened in 2001.

=== Sports college status ===
In 2004, the school was given the special status of sports college. With this new status, the astroturf was built, and a whole change of school image took place. The logo was changed, as was the uniform. With the specialist status, many in the local community use the school's facilities, and the school has become well known in the community. Since the status was granted, improvements have been made to the sports facilities including refurbishment of the changing facilities, and an extension to the sports hall.

Since becoming a sports college, the school has been the hub of the New Forest School Sports Partnership, which encourages and supports sports in the local community through the feeder schools, and through the Dreams and Teams project working with Serokolo High School. The NFSSP has its main base at Testwood, and another base at the other local sports college, Noadswood School.

=== Academy status ===
In late 2011, the school applied for academy status, which was granted in the autumn of 2011.

=== Name change ===
It was announced that Testwood Sports College was reverting to its previous and original name, Testwood School. This was because when the school obtained sports college status, it was to receive government funding, but the government had ended the programme a few years previously. The school decided to keep the name Testwood Sports College, as it is known for its sporting facilities. It was agreed that Testwood was not only good for sporting, but its overall curriculum, and it was decided to revert the name.

== Ofsted ==
In February 2014 Testwood received a judgement of "Inadequate" from Ofsted and was placed in special measures. In June 2014 the Governing Body of the school was sent a pre-warning letter by Lord Nash of the Department of Education advising that standards were seen as "unacceptably low" by the Secretary of State. Since the Ofsted report, I Appleton was replaced in May 2014 by J.A. Pitman. Since she has arrived there have been changes to the uniform, back to what it used to be. More positive changes have been made around the school. In July 2015, Testwood School received a good rating from Ofsted, and the school is no longer in special measures.

== Facilities ==
The school has a synthetic turf pitch, a recently refurbished sports hall, an 18-acre (73,000 m^{2}) field including two adult and two junior football pitches; tennis courts, outdoor basketball hoops, a gymnasium, fitness studio and two drama/dance studios. The school also has 35 general purpose teaching rooms, nine science laboratories, a music suite, six purpose built technology rooms, three art rooms, six ICT suites and a Learning Resource Centre. The LRC spans 450 square meters and was one of the best school libraries in the country when opened. It contains 60 computers alongside the collection of books.

== Structure ==
Pupils usually come to Testwood from the three main feeder schools: Abbotswood Junior School, Calmore Junior School and Oakfield Primary School.

Applications for School Prefect occur during Year 10, and duties continue until the final exams in Year 11. Six students per year group serve on the school council along with the Head Boy and Girl and Deputy Head Boy and Girl.

Testwood bases its organisation on tutor groups. Each has its own tutor and is part of a house system. The houses are named Bedivere, Lancelot, Galahad and Excalibur.

== See also ==
- Totton and Eling – the local town near the school
- Hounsdown School – the next nearest secondary school
