= Totton and Eling =

Civil parish in Hampshire, England

Coordinates: 50.92°N 1.49°W

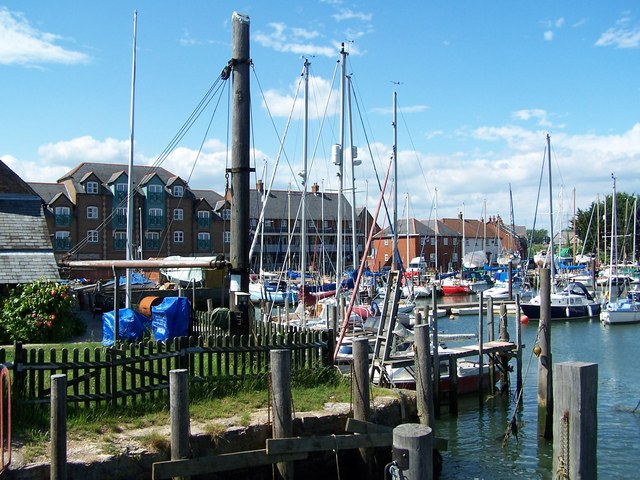
- Eling Creek, adjacent to the tide mill

- Location within Hampshire
- Population: 28,300; 28,970 (2011 Census)
- OS grid reference: SU362131
- Civil parish: Totton and Eling
- District: New Forest
- Shire county: Hampshire
- Region: South East
- Country: England
- Sovereign state: United Kingdom
- Post town: SOUTHAMPTON
- Postcode district: SO40
- Dialling code: 023
- Police: Hampshire and Isle of Wight
- Fire: Hampshire and Isle of Wight
- Ambulance: South Central
- UK Parliament: New Forest East

Totton and Eling (/ˈtɒtən ænd ˈiːlɪŋ/) is a civil parish in Hampshire, England, with a population of 28,970 people. It contains the settlements of Totton, Eling, Calmore, Hounsdown, Rushington and Testwood. It is situated between the eastern edge of the New Forest and the River Test, close to the city of Southampton but outside the city boundary; the town is within the New Forest non-metropolitan district. Surrounding towns and villages include Ashurst, Marchwood, Cadnam and Ower.

== Description ==
The areas behind Calmore Industrial Estate by the River Test have been regenerated with mineral extraction turned into lakes for boating, but their main use is as a sanctuary for local wildlife and local people to enjoy green spaces, with one lake used for fishing and boating and as a water supply resource. There is also the Hampshire & Isle of Wight Wildlife Trust's Testwood Lakes Education Centre. Walks connect the area along the Test Way running from Totton to Inkpen Beacon in Berkshire, via Romsey in Hampshire.

Eling can be accessed by crossing the railway line which divides the original old village of Totton and the areas of Eling, and Hounsdown. This goes to Brokenford which has some pathways from Totton to the A35 Bypass road at Eling recreation ground, by Bartley Water. The village's name is pronounced the same as that of the London town and borough of Ealing.

== History ==
=== Early history ===
Eling's attractions include the parish church and Eling Tide Mill Experience. St Mary's is a Norman church built on Saxon foundations with registers dating back to 1537. The Eling Tide Mill Experience is Eling Tide Mill, its visitor centre, and the outdoor walks around the mill pond at Bartley Water and the Solent Water shoreline at Goatee Beach. Eling Tide Mill is one of the very few working tide mills in the UK but cannot be equated with the mill listed in the Domesday Book in 1086. Hampshire's only surviving medieval toll bridge is here, across Bartley Water by the side of the Tide Mill. This has been in use since at least 1418 and still charges users today. The Eling Tide Mill Experience was closed for refurbishment from 2015 and reopened 9 April 2018.

=== 19th century ===
As of 1875, the name of the parish was Eling, despite Totton being the larger settlement. At this time, according to Kelly's Directory at the time, the parish was within:

- the Southern division of Hampshire
- the hundred of Redbridge
- New Forest Poor Law Union
- Romsey Petty Sessional Division
- Southampton County court district
- the Diocese of Winchester and Archdeaconry of Winchester
- and the rural deanery of Fordingbridge.

The parish was divided into 16 tithings:

- Bartley-Regis
- Bauldoxfee
- Bistern with Bartley
- Colebury
- Durley
- North Eling
- South Eling
- Langley
- Loperwood
- Marchwood
- Rumbridge
- Tatchbury
- Great Testwood
- Little Testwood
- Wade
- Wigley Ower

It was also divided into five ecclesiastical districts: Eling St Mary, North Eling, Netley, Marchwood and Colbury.

=== Recent history ===
The original village of Totton can be described as the areas of Totton, Testwood and the Salmon Leap, dissected by the A36 and the A336 and bordered by the River Test. From this, many new developments were made to expand the town. The Calmore estate was built in the early 1970s to the north of the town, and subsequent housing has merged the estate to the town as a whole. Extended housing to the Hounsdown region also occurred during the 1970s, with the construction of the school and the increased housing found there. In the late 1980s and 1990s, more housing was built to the west of the town towards Netley Marsh and along Ringwood Road. These developments, collectively referred to as West Totton, consisted of a new communal area and church and hall as well as huge amounts of new homes.

== Transport ==
Totton and Eling is served by the railway at Totton railway station, on the South West Main Line to Southampton, London Waterloo, Bournemouth and Poole, and is run by South Western Railway.

Bus services in the town are run by two main companies. Bluestar operate services to Southampton, Cadnam, Hythe, Dibden and around the town. Salisbury Reds also operate cross county routes between Salisbury and Southampton.

The town has easy access to the nearby M27 motorway, to Salisbury via the A36 Salisbury Road, to Lyndhurst and Southampton via the A35 and to the Waterside region by the A326.

The town also has numerous cycle routes, which started with the suburban cycleway through West Totton, constructed when the estate was built and running from Hounsdown to Calmore Road. This has further been extended to two on-road routes to the centre of Totton from Calmore schools down Water Lane, and down Salisbury Road. In addition, there are several links to the New Forest cycle network at Ashurst and Foxhills.

== Sport ==
One of the most successful sporting enterprises of the area has been Totton and Eling Cricket Club. Under its former guise of B.A.T. Sports, it won the Southern Premier League, the highest level of club cricket in the Hampshire area, four times in six seasons between 2001 and 2006. In September 2007 Totton and Eling C.C. became North Gear National 2020 Champions beating Ockbrook & Borrowash in the live televised final on Sky Sports.

Totton also has two local football teams, A.F.C. Totton who play at Testwood Stadium and Totton & Eling F.C. who play at Little Testwood Farm. In 2007, AFC Totton made it to the final of the FA Vase and so had the chance to play in the second competitive match at Wembley Stadium. The club were previously based at a ground in the centre of the town, however moved in 2011 to a new stadium with stand and several training pitches near the outskirts of the town in Calmore. The ground reportedly cost £2.5 million.

Rugby: Tottonians RFC play at water lane. They are an amateur club with 4 adult teams and a thriving mini & junior section. The 1st XV currently play in regional 1 south (level 6). They have won one Hampshire cup whilst playing in the London & South West leagues. Ex players include Italian international David Sisi.

The city is home to Totton Octopush Club. The club train at Totton Leisure Centre. In the 2023 Nautilus Tournament, Totton finishing 7th in Division 6.

== Schools ==
There are two secondary schools and a sixth form college within the parish. Testwood School is in the north of the town was built in the 1940s, and gained Sports College status in 2004. This resulted in improvement of facilities including building of a synthetic turf pitch and an extension to the sports hall. The Testwood school logo includes the river, the wood and salmon, indicating the nearby River Test and the salmon leap. Testwood hires out its sporting facilities after hours, namely the synthetic turf pitch, which is used frequently by the community. Testwood's pupils mainly come from the central Totton and Calmore areas.

Hounsdown School, a Specialist Science College, built in 1963, opened in 1969 is located in the Hounsdown area of the town, south of the A35. It too has experienced expansion in recent years, including the construction of a new sports hall and History Block. The Hounsdown logo is of a stylised, curved triangle. Hounsdown also hires out its sporting facilities after school, namely the swimming pool, which is used frequently by the local community and groups. Hounsdown's catchment area covers Hounsdown village, Eling, South and West Totton, and Ashurst. The catchment area of the school also extends into the New Forest, southwest past the village of Lyndhurst and north past the village of Copythorne, stopping just south of West Wellow

The sixth form college, Totton College, opened in 1955 as Totton Grammar School to provide selective education, when grammar schools were phased out it changed status to a 16 - 19 yr old FE college.

Totton has a split site special educational needs school called Forest Park School, which opened in September 2009, which caters for children from Nursery to Post 16. It's an amalgamation of 2 former SEN schools called Forest Edge School, which was located on Lydlynch Road, this is now the site of Forest Park Primary School, which was built around the old school building. The secondary school, called Forest Park Secondary School, was called Salterns school, which is located on Commercial Road. The Primary site has a range of pupils with moderate, severe and profound learning difficulties, whilst the secondary site provides education for children with severe and profound learning difficulties.

== Religion ==
The town has a number of churches in the area, the biggest and oldest being St. Mary the Virgin church in Eling. Other Anglican churches in the town include the church of St. Anne in Calmore, the church of St. Matthew in Netley Marsh and the church of St. Winfrid in Testwood. These churches form the Team parish of Totton and are part of the Diocese of Winchester. In addition to these, there is also Testwood Baptist Church and Trinity Church in West Totton (Methodist/URC). Near the town centre, there is St Theresa's of the Child Jesus, a Roman Catholic Church.

=== St. Mary the Virgin Church ===
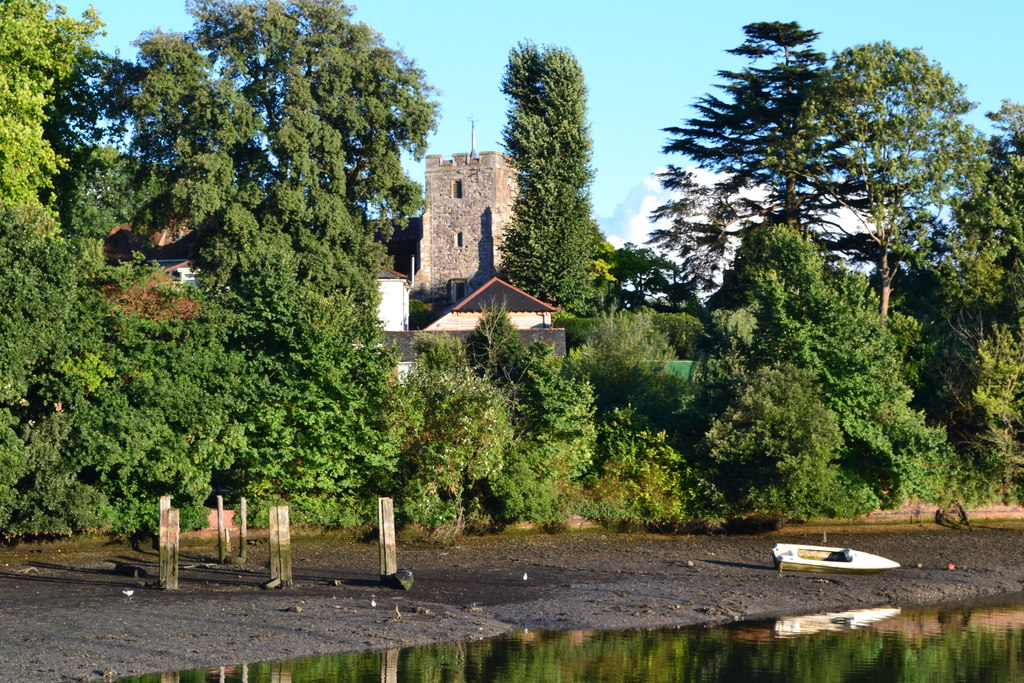
View across Eling Creek to the church of St Mary the Virgin

St Mary the Virgin is the oldest of the churches in the Totton area. Several years ago during the reordering of the church, part of a Celtic cross dating back to the 9th (possibly the 6th) century was found. The site of St Mary's has been a place of Christian worship since that date. The church building has Saxon origins.

Today the church stands on the hill looking out over the bay to the container port on the Southampton side of Millbrook.

The church has a modern interior with a light, open effect and the traditional stone, including a Saxon arch.

St Mary the Virgin Church is a part of the Anglican team ministry that covers Totton and Eling with 38,000 people within its area. Historically the mother church to the area, St Mary's is now one of four churches in the team ministry along with Calmore, Netley Marsh and Testwood. In 2003 two self-styled 'vampires' were imprisoned for harassment of the vicar of St Mary's and his family.
