= Eling, Hampshire =

Settlement in Hampshire, England

Coordinates: 50.9125°N 1.4854°W

Eling
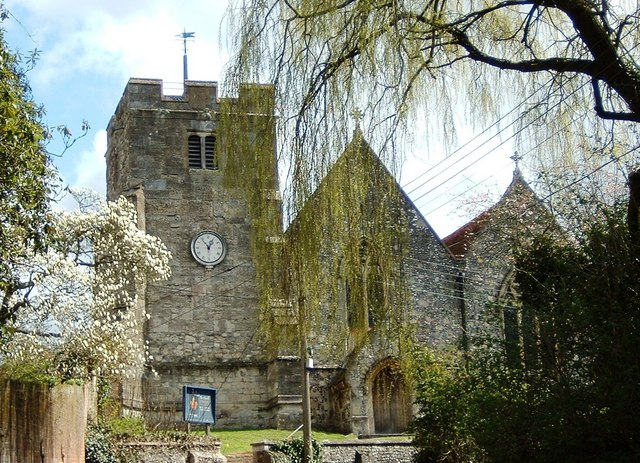

- Location within Hampshire
- Civil parish: Totton and Eling
- District: New Forest
- Shire county: Hampshire
- Region: South East
- Country: England
- Sovereign state: United Kingdom
- Post town: SOUTHAMPTON
- Postcode district: SO40
- Dialling code: 023
- Police: Hampshire and Isle of Wight
- Fire: Hampshire and Isle of Wight
- Ambulance: South Central

Eling is a village in the civil parish of Totton and Eling, in the New Forest district, in the county of Hampshire, England. The parish was originally just called Eling, even though the larger town of Totton was described as the "principal place in the parish" from as early as 1875.

The village is located 86 miles (138 km) from London and is 5 miles northwest of the centre of Southampton.

The name "Eling" means 'Edla's people'. Eling was recorded in the Domesday Book as Edlinges.

Eling is known for the Eling Tide Mill, one of only two remaining operating tide mills in the United Kingdom. Whilst a mill at Eling is mentioned in the Domesday Book of 1086, there is no evidence that there is any connection to the present mill, which was rebuilt roughly two hundred years ago after storm damage in the 1770s.

Eling has a toll bridge across a bridge which originally formed as a causeway across a dam built to create a mill pond.
