= Denny Lodge =

Coordinates: 50.8544°N 1.5047°W

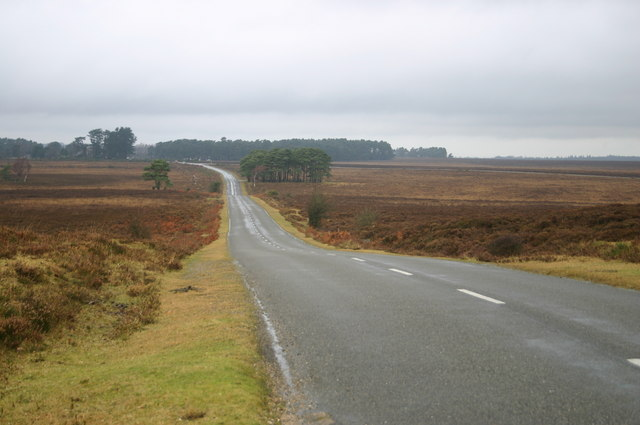
- B3056 road through the heart of the parish

- Location within Hampshire
- Population: 315
- OS grid reference: SU348062
- District: New Forest
- Shire county: Hampshire
- Region: South East
- Country: England
- Sovereign state: United Kingdom
- Police: Hampshire and Isle of Wight
- Fire: Hampshire and Isle of Wight
- Ambulance: South Central
- UK Parliament: New Forest East

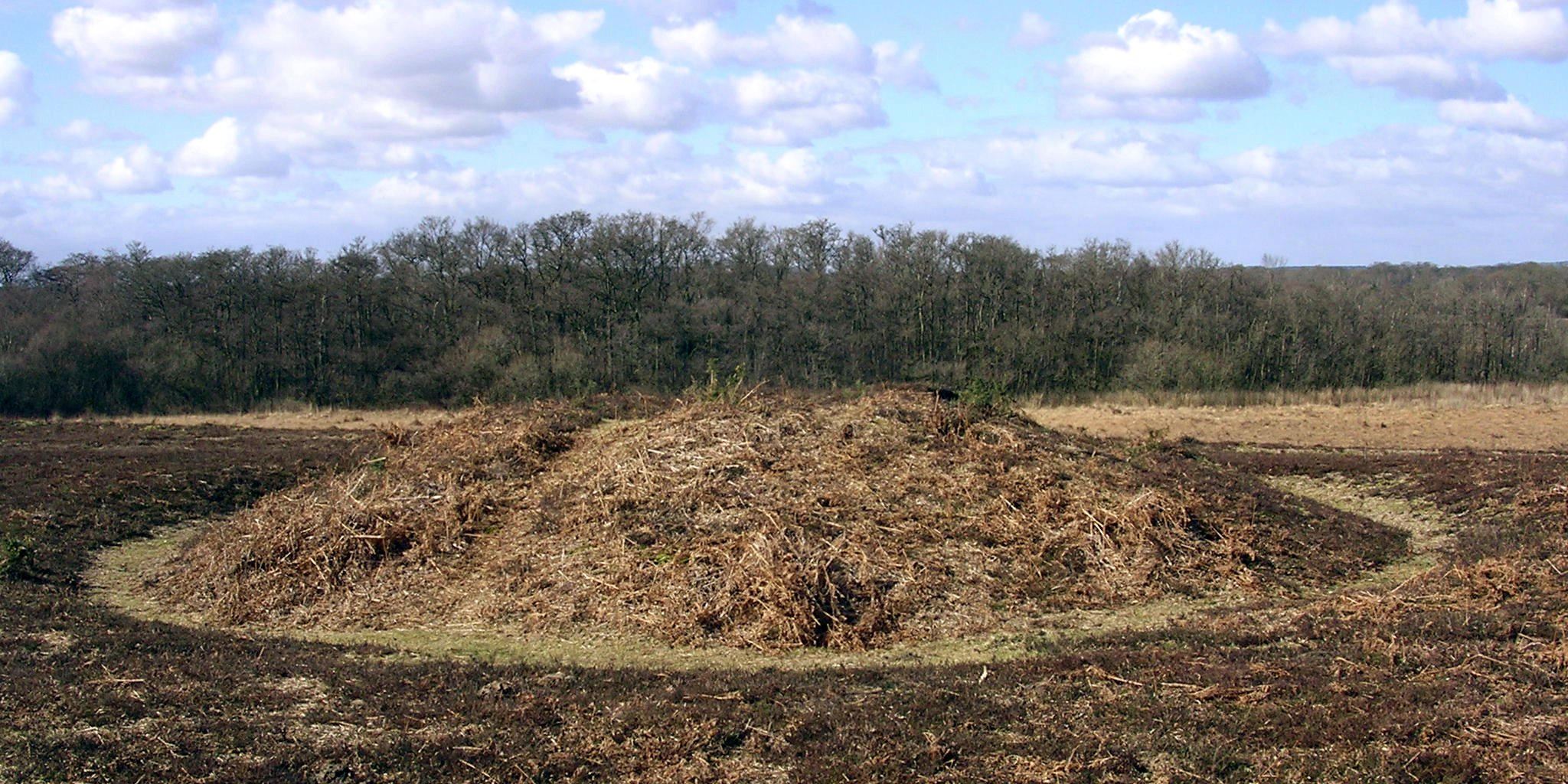
Bronze Age bowl barrow on Matley Heath

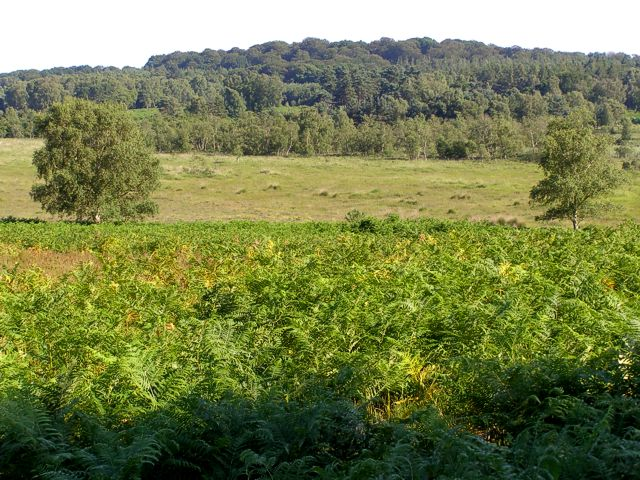
View across the Bishop of Winchester's Purlieu

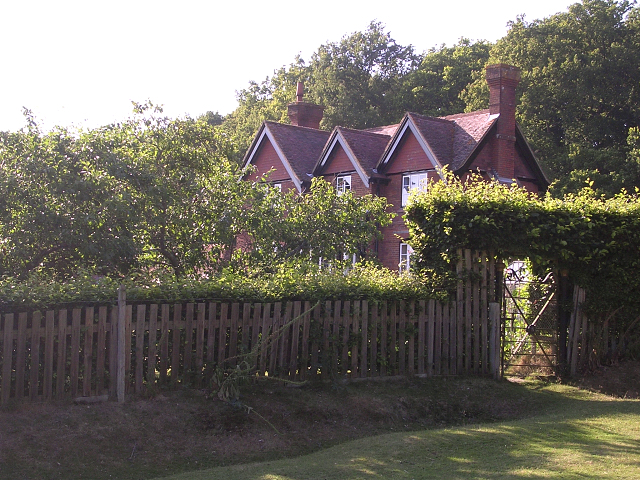
Denny Lodge - the remote building from which the parish is named

Denny Lodge is a large civil parish in the New Forest in Hampshire, England. It covers a large area of heathland and woodland encompassing much of the eastern side of the New Forest, but contains no towns, villages, churches, or schools.

== Overview ==
The parish of Denny Lodge extends from Matley Heath in the north, to King's Copse Inclosure in the south. It is bounded by, but does not include, the towns and villages of Ashurst, Lyndhurst, Brockenhurst, Beaulieu, Fawley and Hythe. The parish is bisected by the South West Main Line railway from Ashurst to Brockenhurst, and by the B3056 road from Lyndhurst to Beaulieu. The isolated Beaulieu Road railway station is at the centre of the parish, where road and rail cross.

The parish is mostly heathland and bogland, intermixed with 20th-century forest inclosures. All of the woodlands are administered by the Forestry Commission as Crown woodland. Many of the forest inclosures on the eastern border of the parish were planted in the 1960s in an attempt to screen the area from the industrial landscape alongside Southampton Water.

The parish has no church, no school, no public hall, but does contain four pubs. The parish forms part of the New Forest district of the county of Hampshire. The parish has a population of 315 people living in 140 households.

== History ==
That people have lived in the area since ancient times is evidenced by the ninety Bronze Age barrows which can be found in the parish. The name of the parish "Denny" is recorded as Dunie in 1300, Dinne in 1347, and Dynney Walke in 1589. The origin of the name is not known. The lodge, after which the parish is named, is situated near the centre of the parish, and was originally the Groom Keeper's Lodge belonging to the Crown Estate, and which later became a Head Forester's residence.

Also found near the centre of the parish is a dyked enclosure known as Bishops Dyke, or The Bishop of Winchester's Purlieu. The earthwork comprises a bank, around 1 metre high and 4 metres wide, between ditches. The precise purpose of the enclosure is not known - it may have been used as a park for grazing, but the current quality of the grazing is poor. The local legend states that King John and the bishop of Winchester were once riding together in the New Forest when the king laughingly told the bishop that he might have "as much land as he could crawl round." The bishop, who was rather fat, had a contraption made to help support him, and so managed to "crawl" round a large area. This became the Bishop's Purlieu.

Within the parish there are sites of two medieval hunting lodges, both called Church Place. The first site, close to the B3056 road to Lyndhurst, is indicated by earthwork banks and an external ditch enclosing a raised platform. The second site is in Churchplace Inclosure near Ashurst on a sandy knoll, and is a square earthwork comprising a broad bank with an outer ditch.

Also near Ashurst are the earthwork remains of a 16th-century saltpetre house. It was probably in use for the manufacture of saltpetre when monopolies for its manufacture in England were granted to Germans. It now consists of banks and hollows of various sizes enclosed in a rectangular area about 100 metres by 50 metres.

In 1847 the Southampton and Dorchester Railway was built through the New Forest, and Beaulieu Road railway station was opened in what is now the middle of the parish. The village of Beaulieu is some 3.5 miles (5.5 km) to the south of the station, and as a result, the station remains very rural.

The civil parish of Denny Lodge was created in 1868 from extra-parochial parts of the New Forest. It was enlarged in 1934 with the addition of 862 acres from Brockenhurst parish, and 4722 acres from Colbury parish which was abolished in that year.
