= Bartley, Hampshire =

Village in Hampshire, England

Coordinates: 50°55′11″N 1°33′55″W

Bartley
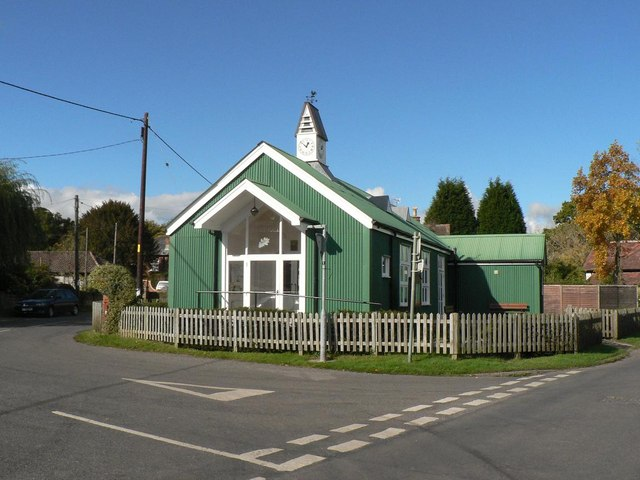
- Bartley village hall, and former church

- Location within Hampshire
- OS grid reference: SU306134
- Civil parish: Copythorne
- District: New Forest
- Shire county: Hampshire
- Region: South East
- Country: England
- Sovereign state: United Kingdom
- Post town: SOUTHAMPTON
- Postcode district: SO40
- Dialling code: 023
- Police: Hampshire and Isle of Wight
- Fire: Hampshire and Isle of Wight
- Ambulance: South Central
- UK Parliament: New Forest East

Bartley is a village in Hampshire, England, within the boundaries of the New Forest National Park, seven miles (11 km) west of Southampton.

== Overview ==
Bartley is in the civil parish of Copythorne (where the 2011 census was included). Surrounding villages are Copythorne to the north, Cadnam to the west, and Woodlands to the southeast.

At the heart of Bartley is "The Tin Church" - an Anglican church reading room built in 1900 from corrugated iron and painted green. It was used for church services until 1992. A Charitable Trust then bought and renovated it. Now it is used as a Village Hall and community centre. Also central to the community is Fourways Stores and Bartley Post Office, owned and run by the same family for over thirty years. There is a pub called "The Haywain" (featuring the painting by Constable on the pub sign). Bartley Junior School is just north of the village centre.

There are a number of entrances to the New Forest in Bartley, with cattle grids to keep the horses and other grazing animals in the forest. Bartley has a stream running near it called Bartley Water.

== History ==
The name Bartley means "birch wood". In 1586 it is recorded as "Bartlie Regis", the name being Anglicised to "Barkley Kings" on a map of 1695. Nearby Bartley Manor is an 18th-century house with a three-storey main block and two-storey wings. Bartley Lodge is also an 18th-century house which now operates as a hotel.
