= Netley Marsh =

Village in Hampshire, England

Coordinates: 50.9167°N 1.5333°W

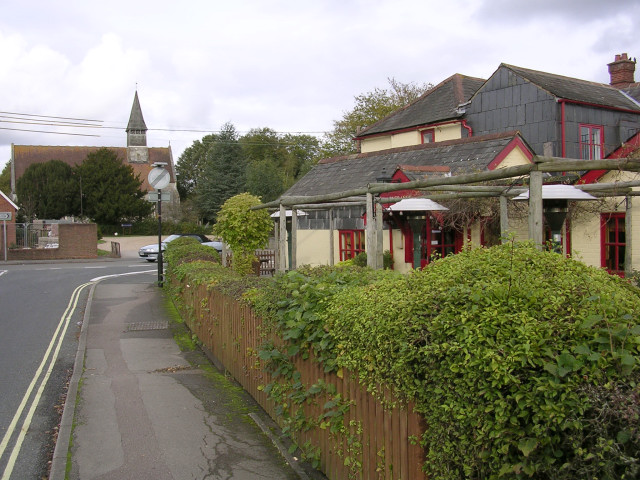
- Netley Marsh

- Location within Hampshire
- Population: 2,012
- OS grid reference: SU329131
- Civil parish: Netley Marsh
- District: New Forest
- Shire county: Hampshire
- Region: South East
- Country: England
- Sovereign state: United Kingdom
- Post town: SOUTHAMPTON
- Postcode district: SO40
- Dialling code: 023
- Police: Hampshire and Isle of Wight
- Fire: Hampshire and Isle of Wight
- Ambulance: South Central
- UK Parliament: New Forest East

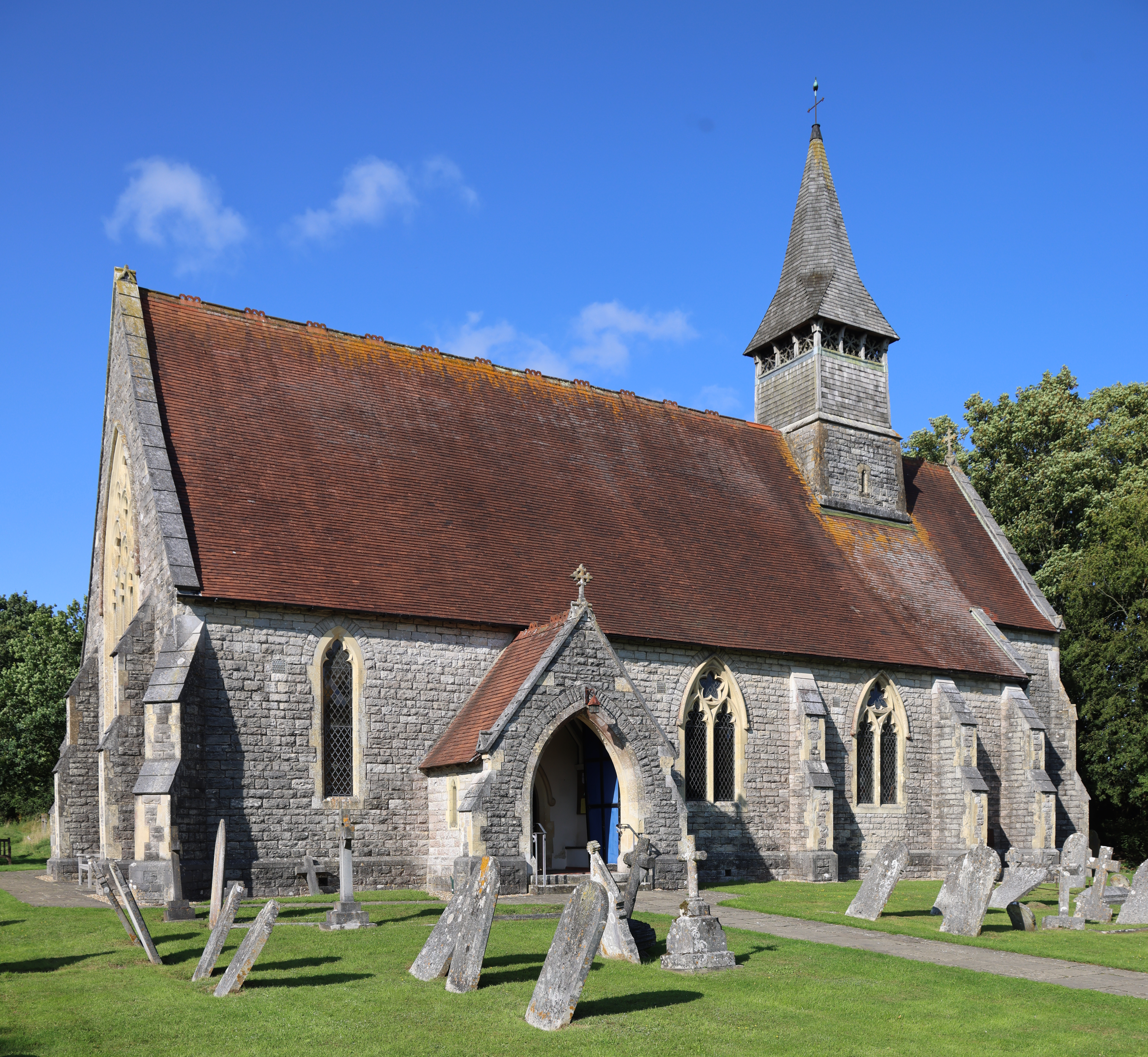
St Matthew's church

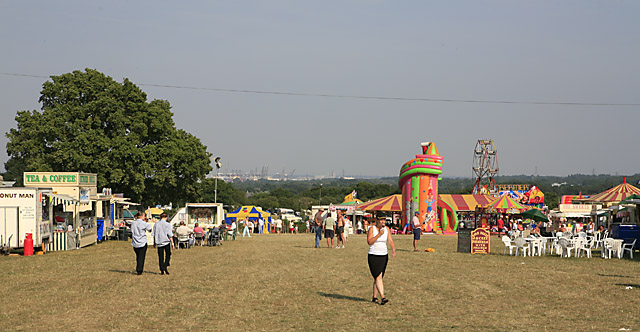
Netley Marsh Steam and Craft Show

Netley Marsh is a village and civil parish in Hampshire, close to the town of Totton. It lies within the New Forest District, and the New Forest National Park. It is the supposed site of the battle between an invading Anglo Saxon army, under Cerdic and a British army under the probably fictitious king Natanleod in the year 508.

== Overview ==
Netley Marsh lies to the west of Southampton. The village is on the A336 road from Cadnam to Totton. The parish is bounded by Bartley Water in the south, and River Blackwater in the north. The village of Woodlands is in the south of the parish, and the hamlets of Hillstreet and Ower (chiefly in Copythorne parish) are to the north. The M27 motorway runs through this parish, taking roughly the route of the Roman road from Nursling to Cadnam.

Since 1971, the village has been host to the annual Netley Marsh Steam and Craft Show, a three-day event dedicated to demonstrations of steam-powered vehicles and traction engines held in July of each year. The original event was named a Puff-in and was held to raise money for repairing St Matthew's the village church.

Netley Marsh is the base for the international development charity Tools for Self Reliance, which refurbishes and ships old tools and sewing machines to Africa.

== History ==
Netley Marsh is often identified with the "Natanleaga" described in the Anglo-Saxon Chronicle under the year 508, where it is reported that the Anglo-Saxon kings Cerdic and Cynric "killed a certain British king named Natanleod, and five-thousand men with him – after whom the land as far as Cerdic's ford was named Natanleaga". Whatever the truth concerning the battle, it is unlikely that there was a king called Natanleod – he was probably invented to explain the place-name Natanleaga. In fact the place-name is probably derived from the Old English elements *næt ("wet", a reconstructed cognate of German nass) and lēah, meaning "wet wood". The original meaning would have ceased to be apparent after the word *næt fell out of use.

Netley is next recorded as "Nateleg" in 1248. The name "Netley Marsh" appears as such on maps from 1759. The church, dedicated to Saint Matthew, was built around 1855, and consists of a nave and chancel with a bell turret on west side of the chancel.

To the west of the village the Hampshire Reformatory School opened in 1855. It was built for the purpose of reclaiming juvenile offenders, and had accommodation for 60 boys. It was closed in 1908. The civil parish of Netley Marsh was one of the parishes formed from the ancient parish of Eling in 1894. The village suffered some damage during World War II, when one day in 1942 an enemy plane dropped bombs on the church and along Woodlands Road, causing the deaths of three people. A stained glass window in the church that was destroyed during the war was replaced in 1954.

=== Tatchbury ===
One mile north of Netley Marsh is the ancient site of Tatchbury. There is an Iron Age Hill fort here called Tatchbury Mount. It has been partly built over by the hospital buildings of Tatchbury Mount Hospital but the outline of the fort can still be seen.

Next to the hill fort is the ancient manor of Tatchbury. Its history dates from the 10th century when a hide and a half of land in Tatchbury and Slackstead was given to Hyde Abbey (near Winchester) on its foundation in 903 by Edward the Elder. The Domesday Book refers to another half hide being given to the Abbey sometime after 1066 by Edsi the Sheriff. The abbot and convent evidently held the manor in demesne from the 12th to the 13th century, and a rent from Litchfield and Tatchbury was included in the estates of the Abbey at the time of the Dissolution.

Another estate in Tatchbury is recorded in the 13th century which may have been the nucleus of the later manor which was held in 1316 by Elias Baldet, and of which John Romsey died seised in 1494, holding it of the warden of Winchester College. The Oviatt family held the manor for much of the 17th and 18th century, before passing to the Wake family who held it until the late 19th century. Tatchbury Manor House today is mostly a brick Victorian building, but which incorporates part of the old 13th century manor house.
