= Raymond Pitman =

English cricketer

Personal information
- Full name: Raymond Walter Charles Pitman
- Born: 21 February 1933; Bartley, Hampshire, England
- Died: 5 June 1998 (aged 65); Rhos-on-Sea, Denbighshire, Wales
- Batting: Right-handed
- Bowling: Right-arm medium-fast

Domestic team information
- Years: Team
- 1954–1959: Hampshire

Career statistics
Competition	First-class
Matches	50
Runs scored	926
Batting average	13.61
100s/50s	–/1
Top score	77
Balls bowled	95
Wickets	1
Bowling average	68.00
5 wickets in innings	–
10 wickets in match	–
Best bowling	1/4
Catches/stumpings	42/–
- Source: Cricinfo, 15 February 2010

Raymond Walter Charles Pitman (21 February 1933 — 5 June 1998) was an English first-class cricketer.

Pitman was born in February 1933 at Bartley, Hampshire. Having spent four years playing for Hampshire second team, Pitman made his debut in first-class cricket for the Hampshire first team against Oxford University at Oxford in 1954. Later that season he made three appearances in the County Championship, but did not feature for Hampshire the following season. He became a more established figure in the Hampshire team from 1956 to 1958, making 43 first-class appearances between those seasons and played most regularly in 1958, making 24 appearances. He recorded his only half century during that season, making a score of 77 against Derbyshire in Hampshire's last match of the 1958 County Championship. He made just three first-class appearances in 1959, before a broken finger against the Marylebone Cricket Club at Lord's ruled him out for three-weeks; this match subsequently turned out to be his last for Hampshire. He was described by Wisden as an "aggressive batsman", though it was also suggested by the same publication that as a cricketer he never quite made the grade. In exactly fifty first-class matches, he scored 926 runs at an average of 13.61.

Following his retirement from county cricket, he played club cricket in Scotland. Pitman later held a coaching and administrative post at Rydal Penrhos School at Colwyn Bay in Wales. Shortly after Pitman's retirement at the age of 65, he was diagnosed with cancer and subsequently died in June 1998 at Rhos-on-Sea, Denbighshire.
