= Ashurst, Hampshire =

Village in Hampshire, England

Coordinates: 50.894817°N 1.516685°W

Ashurst
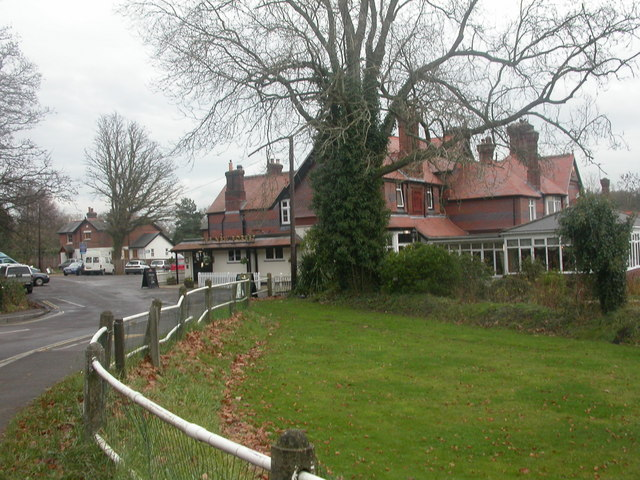

- Location within Hampshire
- Population: 2,093 (2011 Census)
- OS grid reference: SU3408810704
- Civil parish: Ashurst and Colbury
- District: New Forest
- Shire county: Hampshire
- Region: South East
- Country: England
- Sovereign state: United Kingdom
- Post town: SOUTHAMPTON
- Postcode district: SO40
- Dialling code: 023
- Police: Hampshire and Isle of Wight
- Fire: Hampshire and Isle of Wight
- Ambulance: South Central
- UK Parliament: New Forest East

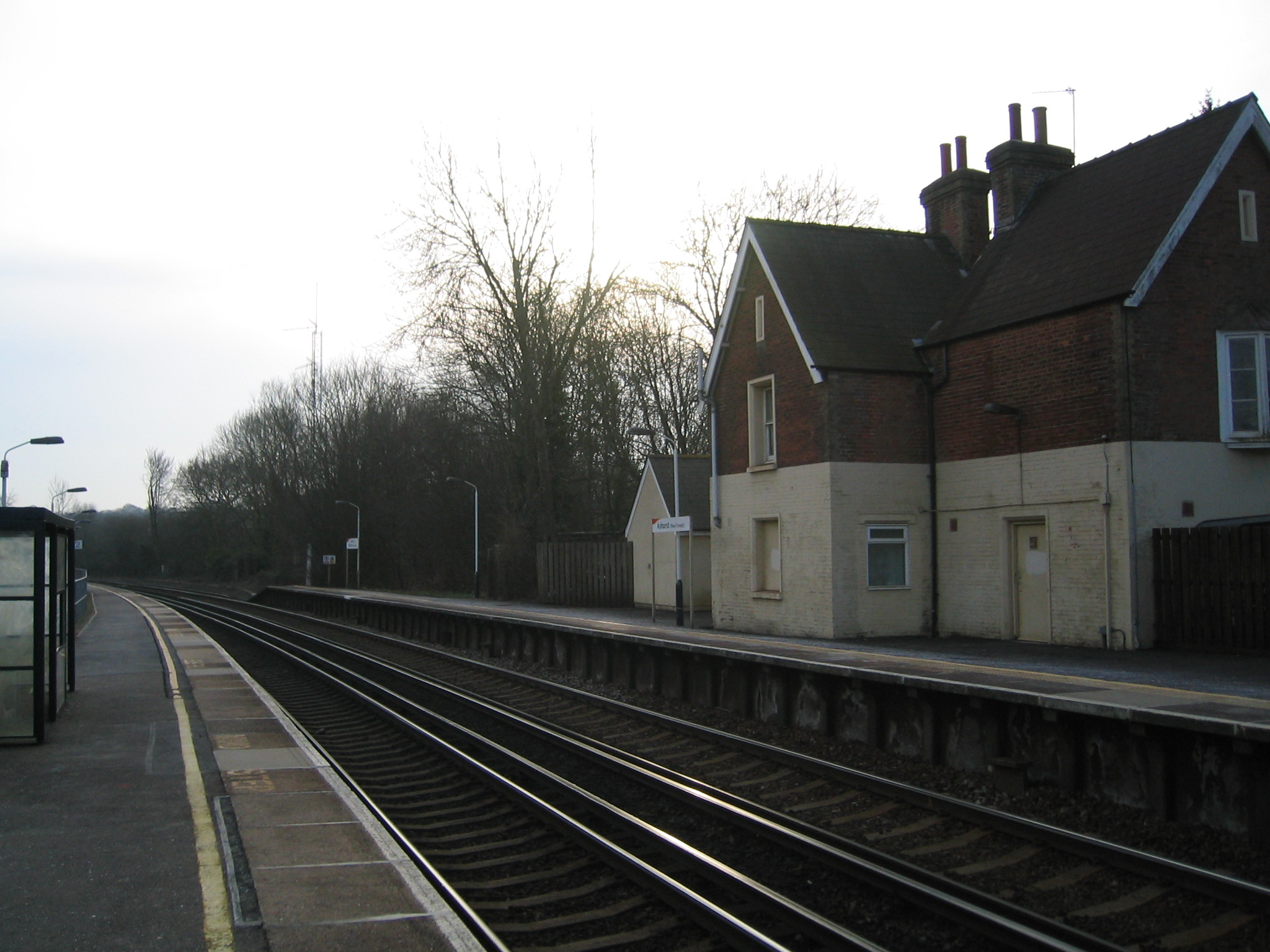
Ashurst Station

Ashurst is a village in the New Forest district of Hampshire, England, which together with Colbury hamlet makes the parish of Ashurst and Colbury. Ashurst is on the A35 road near the Southampton conurbation. According to the 2001 census the parish had a population of 2,011, increasing to 2,093 at the 2011 Census. The parish is on the edge of the designated New Forest National Park area. The village has a campsite, some shops and a railway station. The parish is bounded to the west by Netley Marsh parish and the Bartley Water, to the north by the A326 road and Totton and Eling, and to the south by Denny Lodge parish in the New Forest.

Ashurst is close to the City of Southampton and is often considered an exurb of it, a large percentage of its population being commuters.

Millvina Dean, the last survivor of the sinking of RMS Titanic, was living in Ashurst at the time of her death in May 2009 at the age of 97.

== Amenities ==
There are many businesses along the main road through Ashurst, including pubs, restaurants, boutique clothing and accessories shop, a vet, an upholsterer, a hair salon, a car accessories shop and a car dealer. The post office closed at the end of January 2019.

== Education ==
There are two schools in Ashurst, Foxhills Infant School and Foxhills Junior School. Foxhills Infant School teaches pupils between the ages of four and seven and as of May 2011 had in total 210 pupils on roll. It shares its grounds with Foxhills Junior School, where many of the Infant School pupils progress onto. The Junior School was opened as a middle school in September 1977 when the buildings and facilities of the original Junior School, which had been established ten years previously, were substantially enlarged and extended to provide for the 8–12 middle school age range. In 1993, it became a Junior School once again taking in children aged between 7 and 11. The school had around 332 children on roll in September 2010 and the current Headteacher is Andrew Shore. The majority of pupils come from the neighbouring Foxhills Infants School, Eling Infants School or Hazelwood First School. In its most recent Ofsted inspection report in 2010, it received a Grade 2 (good).

Both schools enjoy a 16-acre site with large playgrounds and many resources, including a 6-acre nature reserve with a pond. The reserve, during the last few years, has benefited from a £22K grant from the Millennium Heritage Fund which allowed construction paths and access routes for year-round use. The whole school building area is protected by CCTV and a private patrol company.

Also on the same site is Ashurst Pre-School that currently takes 86 children from two years nine months to five years on roll.

During secondary school, most children enroll in Hounsdown, two villages across in Totton.

== Transport links ==
Ashurst is well served by transport links, the largest being the Ashurst railway station, with services operated by South Western Railway. The station is on the South West Main Line from London Waterloo to Weymouth. Ashurst is also on the Bluestar 6 Bus Route (recently replacing the Wilts and Dorset's 56/56A route) that runs from Lymington to Southampton.
