= Charles Lyell (botanist) =

Scottish botanist (1767–1849)

- Born: 7 March 1767; Southampton Buildings, Holborn, London
- Died: 8 November 1849 (aged 82); Kinnordy
- Occupation: Botanist
- Known for: Translator of Dante
- Notable work: The Canzoniere of Dante ... including the poems of the Vita Nuova and Convito

Charles Lyell (1767–1849) was a Scottish botanist, known also as a translator of Dante.

== Life ==
Lyell was born on 7 March 1767, at Kinnordy, Forfarshire, Scotland. He was the eldest son of Charles Lyell of Kinnordy, Forfarshire, Scotland, and Mary Beale of West Looe; his sister Anne married Gilbert Heathcote.

== Education ==
He was educated at St Paul's School, London, the University of St. Andrews and Peterhouse, Cambridge, where he graduated B.A. in 1791, proceeding M.A. in 1794.

A law student at Lincoln's Inn, Lyell also travelled. In 1796 he inherited the Kinnordy estate at Kirriemuir. He gave up law as a profession, and married.

From 1797 to 1825 Lyell lived at Bartley Lodge in the New Forest; in 1813 he became a fellow of the Linnean Society. In 1826 he settled at Kinnordy, and he died there on 8 November 1849, leaving a library of works relating to his studies.

== Works ==
Lyell concentrated on botany, especially the study of mosses; several species of these plants bear his name, besides the genus Lyellia of Robert Brown. He also contributed lichens to James Edward Smith's English Botany. While not publishing, he corresponded with William Jackson Hooker, James Sowerby and Brown.

In 1835 Lyell published, at his own expense, a translation The Canzoniere of Dante ... including the poems of the Vita Nuova and Convito. In 1842 another edition of The Vita Nuova and Convito was published in London, and in 1845 a collection of translations, The Lyrical Poems of Dante. In 1847 he issued in Paris Notes to J. Hardouin's "Doutes proposées sur l'âge du Dante".

== Family ==
Lyell married in 1796 Frances, a daughter of Thomas Smith of Maker Hall, Swaledale, Yorkshire, by whom he had three sons and seven daughters. His wife died in 1850. His eldest son was Sir Charles Lyell. A son Henry went into the army, and another, Thomas, into the navy.

== Notes ==
Attribution

This article incorporates text from a publication now in the public domain: Lee, Sidney, ed. (1893). "Lyell, Charles (1767-1849)". Dictionary of National Biography. Vol. 34. London: Smith, Elder & Co.
