= Woodlands, Hampshire =

Village in Hampshire, England

Coordinates: 50°54′15″N 1°32′32″W

Woodlands
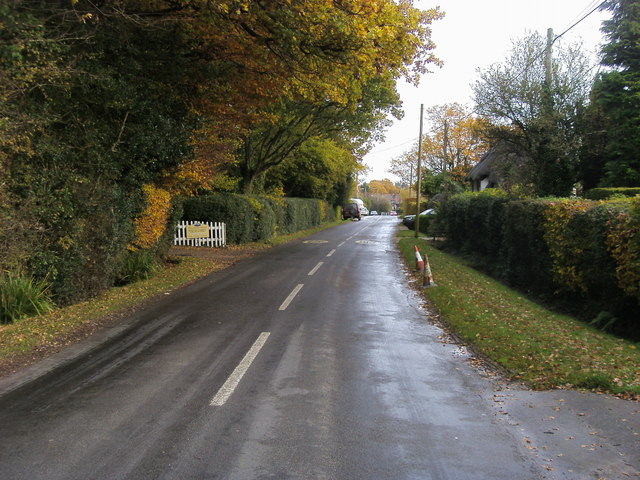
- Woodlands Road

- Location within Hampshire
- OS grid reference: SU323117
- Civil parish: Netley Marsh
- District: New Forest
- Shire county: Hampshire
- Region: South East
- Country: England
- Sovereign state: United Kingdom
- Post town: SOUTHAMPTON
- Postcode district: SO40
- Dialling code: 023
- Police: Hampshire and Isle of Wight
- Fire: Hampshire and Isle of Wight
- Ambulance: South Central
- UK Parliament: New Forest East

Woodlands is a village in the New Forest National Park of Hampshire, England. The village lies 6 miles (9.7 km) west from Southampton and 2 3/4 miles (4.4 km) north-east from Lyndhurst. The village is in the civil parish of Netley Marsh.

== History ==
Before the 20th century, Woodlands was a sparsely populated settlement. Two historic buildings are known as Goldenhayes and Woodlands Lodge Hotel. The latter was a hunting lodge dating from around 1770 – it was converted to a hotel in the 1950s. There was a pub here by the beginning of the 20th century known as The Royal Oak – now known as The Gamekeeper. Woodlands experienced some growth following the arrival of Sir Richard Leys, a major employer in the 1920s. Sir Richard had Woodlands House built in 1905, and a number of other Edwardian houses in Woodlands commissioned by him - Lampits house was his coach house where his chauffeur lived, and a house on the double bend near Busketts Lawn was his stables. More infilling of houses occurred in the 1920s and 1930s, and especially in the post World War II period with the building of many of the bungalows along the northern end of Woodlands Road.

== Features ==
Woodlands, being located within the New Forest boundary, is primarily made up of forest enclosures. The closest being Woodlands enclosure, which contains many different footpaths and bridleways some leading to the closest town, Lyndhurst. The enclosure itself is used by a wide variety of people including, dog walkers and horse riders.

Woodlands is a destination for tourists and sightseers, and is home to several B&Bs and one hotel with a three-star rating, the Woodland Lodge Hotel.
