= Natanleod =

Alleged king of the Britons

- Died: circa 508; Netley Marsh

Natanleod, according to the Anglo-Saxon Chronicle, was a king of the Britons ruling over a territory located in what is now Hampshire. His inclusion in the Chronicle is widely believed to be the product of folk etymology.

== History ==
Under the year 508, a date which is not to be relied upon, the Anglo-Saxon Chronicle reports that Cerdic and Cynric "killed a certain British king named Natanleod, and 5 thousand men with him – after whom the land as far as Cerdic's ford was named Natanleaga". Cerdic's ford is identified with North Charford and South Charford in modern Hampshire and Natanleaga with a marshy area, Netley Marsh, close to the town of Totton in Hampshire. This claim is disputed by Andrew Breeze, who takes the account to be genuine. Bernard Mees, while agnostic to the entry's truth, notes that the story could be a garbled recollection of Brythonic infighting in sub-Roman Britain given Cerdic's own name is known to be of Celtic origin.

Natanleaga, however, is generally thought not to preserve the name of a defeated British king, but is instead derived from the Old English element næt ("wet") (in its weak oblique form natan). However this hypothesized weak oblique form is not otherwise attested according to Bernard Mees. Potential onomastic evidence for a Celtic origin exists: a recent find of pottery at a Roman settlement at Healam Bridge west of Pickhill, North Yorkshire contains the Gaulish name Natonus, which could be linguistically related. According to this theory the second element of this name is the Old English lēod ("prince" or "chief") and the source used by the Chronicle's compiler may have read something like "Natan leod". Edwin Guest in 1842 suggested a similar derivation, although lacking the Healam Bridge evidence supposed "Nate to be a fem. subst. signifying a district, Natanleod will mean the Prince of Nate, and Natanleaga the lea of Nate."

If his origin is as an invented persona, Natanleod is not unique in the early part of the Chronicle. Similar folk etymologies are believed to have produced the Jutish king Wihtgar, Port, the supposed eponym of Portsmouth, and others. James Campbell notes the similarity between such Anglo-Saxon traditions and the Middle Irish language dindshenchas, such as the Metrical Dindshenchas, which record traditions about places.

In the 18th and 19th centuries, Natanleod was frequently identified with Ambrosius Aurelianus, or even Uther Pendragon. Edward Gibbon, in The History of the Decline and Fall of the Roman Empire, refers to this identification with scepticism: "By the unanimous, though doubtful, conjecture of our antiquarians, Ambrosius is confounded with Natanleod, who lost his own life and five thousand of his subjects in a battle against Cerdic, the West Saxon."
