= Ower =

Hamlet in Hampshire, England

Coordinates: 50°57′N 1°32′W

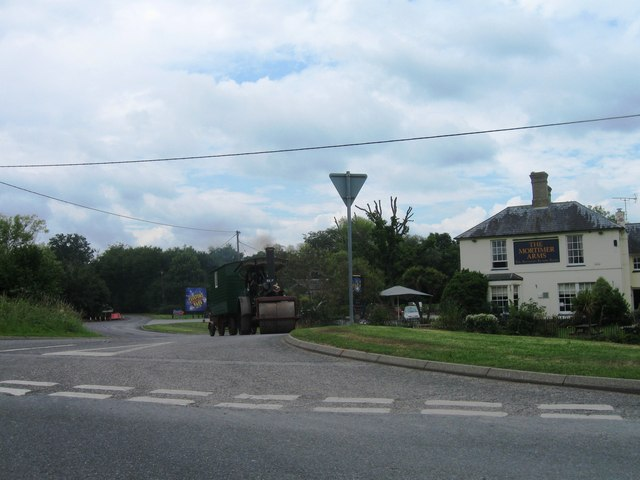
- Road junction at Ower

- Location within Hampshire
- OS grid reference: SU325165
- Civil parish: Copythorne; Netley Marsh
- District: New Forest
- Shire county: Hampshire
- Region: South East
- Country: England
- Sovereign state: United Kingdom
- Post town: ROMSEY
- Postcode district: SO51
- Dialling code: 023
- Police: Hampshire and Isle of Wight
- Fire: Hampshire and Isle of Wight
- Ambulance: South Central
- UK Parliament: New Forest East

Ower is a hamlet in the New Forest district of Hampshire, England. Its nearest towns are Totton – approximately 3 miles (4.8 km) to the southeast, and Romsey – around 4 miles (6.4 km) to the north-east.

Ower lies on the A36 road northwest of Totton. It lies mostly within the civil parish of Copythorne (where the majority of the population was included), although buildings on the east side of the road are in the civil parish of Netley Marsh. It is, however, somewhat cut off from these two parishes by the M27 motorway which passes immediately to the south of the hamlet.
