= Cadnam =

Village in Hampshire, England

Coordinates: 50.91°N 01.58°W

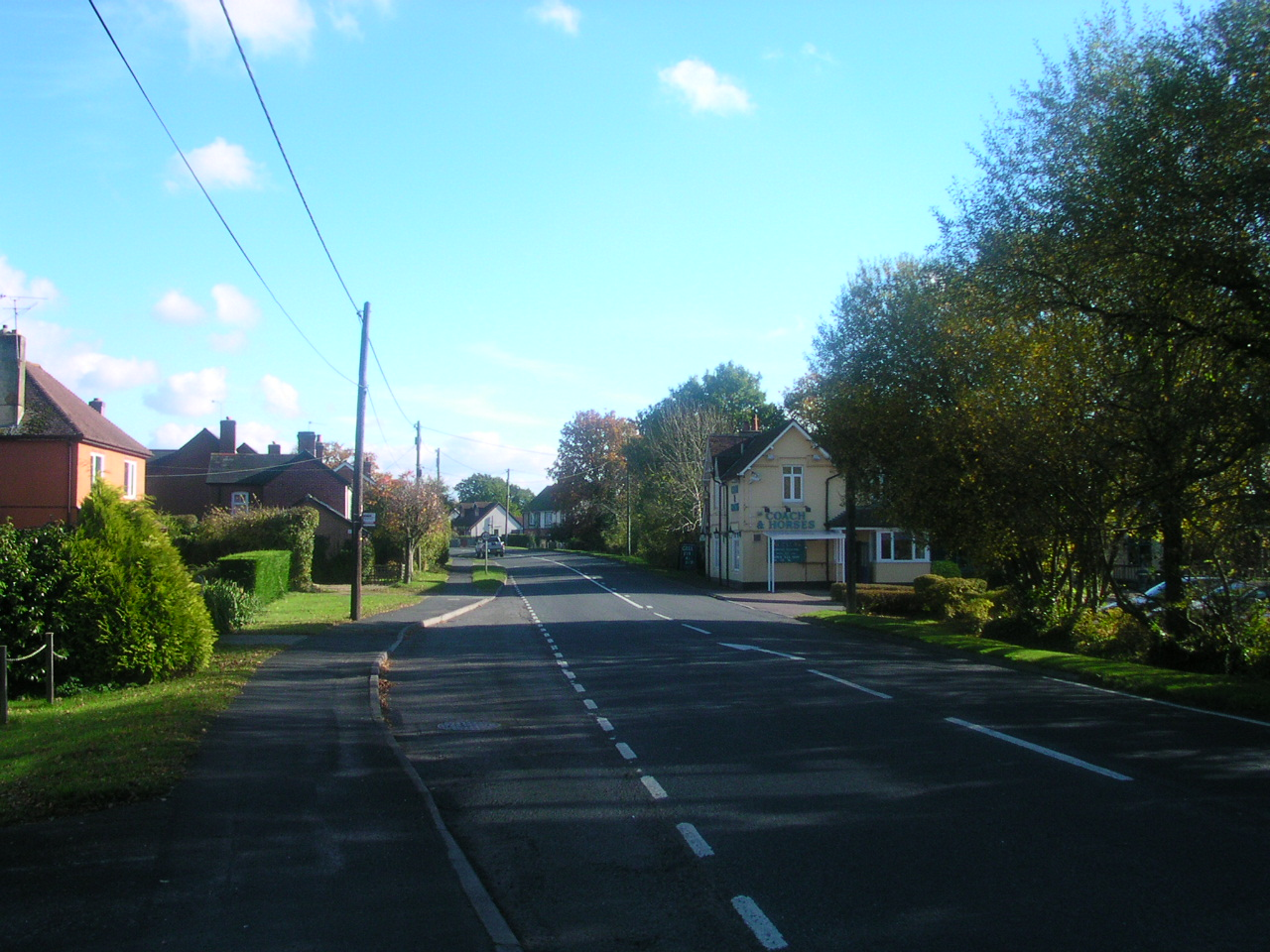
- The road to Netley Marsh

- Location within Hampshire
- OS grid reference: SU2913
- Civil parish: Copythorne
- District: New Forest
- Shire county: Hampshire
- Region: South East
- Country: England
- Sovereign state: United Kingdom
- Post town: SOUTHAMPTON
- Postcode district: SO40
- Dialling code: 023
- Police: Hampshire and Isle of Wight
- Fire: Hampshire and Isle of Wight
- Ambulance: South Central
- UK Parliament: New Forest East

Cadnam is a village situated in Hampshire, England, within the boundaries of the New Forest National Park. The village has existed since the medieval period, when it was (and still is) an important crossroads between Southampton and the towns of Dorset.

== Overview ==
Cadnam is part of the civil parish of Copythorne, a smaller village lying a mile to the north.

The village is situated at the crossroads between the Romsey to Ringwood road (the A31 road) and the Southampton to Fordingbridge B3079. This makes it an important link between Southampton and the towns of Dorset via Ringwood, and towns in Wiltshire via Fordingbridge. The A337 road links Cadnam with the small port at Lymington. The western end (Junction 1) of the M27 motorway is at Cadnam. Surrounding villages are Copythorne to the northeast, and Bartley to the southeast.

There are a number of pubs in Cadnam, including the White Hart (after White Hart), The Sir John Barleycorn (after John Barleycorn) and The Coach And Horses located halfway through Cadnam on Southampton Road. There is also a hotel, The Bartley Lodge Hotel, and a Methodist church. The village has a petrol station with a convenience store.

Cadnam is home to Cadnam Cricket Club (established in 1880) who play on the Lambs Corner ground (adjacent to the road to Lyndhurst).

== History ==
Cadnam is first recorded in the 1270s as Cadenham. The name apparently means the farmstead ("ham") of a man named Cadda.

In the 13th century there was an estate at Cadnam and at nearby Winsor which belonged to the nuns of Amesbury, who in 1286 obtained a grant of free warren in both estates. It seems to have formed part of the manor of Wigley, and the rent of tenants at Cadnam was paid to Amesbury Abbey until the Dissolution. Land at Cadnam and Winsor was granted with the manor of Wigley to Edmund Vaughan in 1545. All of these lands subsequently became part of the Paultons estate.

A Congregational chapel at Cadnam was founded in 1790.

== The Cadnam Oak ==
The Cadnam Oak, at the south-east corner of a crossroads in Cadnam (grid reference SU292136), is thought to be a "boundary tree" of the New Forest. Legend has it that the Cadnam Oak puts forth green leaves on Christmas Day, being leafless immediately before and after the day. The current tree is actually a descendant of the first Cadnam Oak, but the fame still continues. Popular tradition even has it that the tree only buds on Old Christmas Day on 6 January, refusing to acknowledge the Gregorian calendar change of 1752.

== Notable residents ==
- Bentley Collingwood Hilliam
- Sir Charles Lyell spent much of his childhood at Bartley Lodge
