= Copythorne =

Village and parish in Hampshire, England

Coordinates: 50.930°N 1.564°W

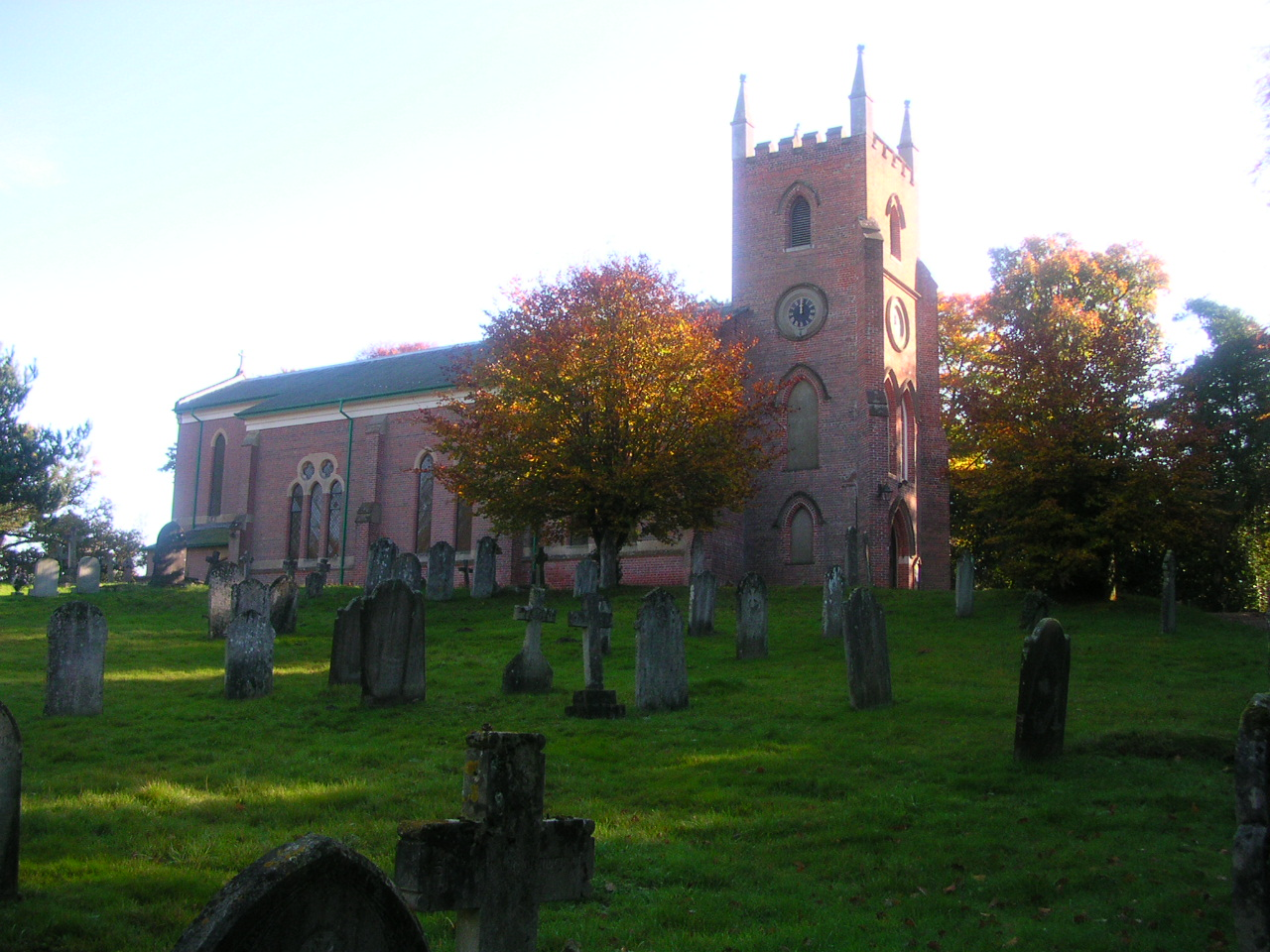
- St. Mary's church, Copythorne

- Location within Hampshire
- Population: 2,673 (2011 Census including Ower)
- OS grid reference: SU308147
- Civil parish: Copythorne
- District: New Forest
- Shire county: Hampshire
- Region: South East
- Country: England
- Sovereign state: United Kingdom
- Post town: SOUTHAMPTON
- Postcode district: SO40
- Dialling code: 023
- Police: Hampshire and Isle of Wight
- Fire: Hampshire and Isle of Wight
- Ambulance: South Central
- UK Parliament: New Forest East

Copythorne is a village and civil parish in Hampshire, England, within the boundaries of the New Forest National Park.

== Overview ==
Copythorne is in the north-eastern part of the New Forest. The village is on the A31 Romsey Road, just south of the M27 motorway which splits the parish into two. There is an Anglican parish church dedicated to Saint Mary, an Infants School, and a hall.

The parish contains the villages of Bartley, Cadnam, Newbridge, and Winsor, together with the hamlet of Wigley and part of the hamlet of Ower. To the north of the village is Copythorne Common; parts of Cadnam Common and Furzley Common are also in the parish, as well as Shelly Common in the far north. There is woodland in the south and north of the parish, and Paultons Park – an old estate with a modern theme park – is also in the parish.

== History ==
Copythorne is first recorded as Coppethorne in the 14th century. The name means "Cropped (haw)thorn", which relates to the practice of pollarding trees to provide feed for animals.

There are several Bronze Age barrows in the parish, locally called "Money Hills". At approximately the site of the present church, the Roman road from Nursling suddenly turned south towards Cadnam roundabout.

In the Middle Ages much of the land in the area was part of the monastic estates of Amesbury, Netley, and Glastonbury. After the Dissolution many of these lands become part of the Paultons estate.

Saint Mary's Church in Copythorne is a red brick structure built in 1834, with alterations made around 1891–2. The civil parish of Copythorne was one of those created out of the ancient parish of Eling in 1894.

== Scouts ==
Copythorne is home to Stanley's Own scout group, one of the longest established Scout Groups and was founded in 1910 by Major R C H Sloane-Stanley who was a colleague of Baden Powell. It has its Headquarters in Romsey Road, Copythorne.

The original Scout Hut was built in 1912 and is probably the oldest Headquarters in Hampshire still in use.

== Carnival ==
The carnival in Copythorne has been running since 1947, the aim of the carnival weekend is to raise funds for the local scout group the 2nd New Forest North (Stanleys Own) Scouts, Charity Number 1015583.
