= Tools for Self Reliance =

- Established: 1979 (47 years ago)
- Types: nonprofit organization
- Headquarters: Southampton
- Country: United Kingdom
- Revenue: 698,770 pound sterling (2024)
- Employees: 10 (2024)
- Volunteers: 350 (2024)

Tools for Self Reliance is an international development charity in the United Kingdom which recycles and refurbishes tools and sewing machines and supplies them to partners in Africa in conjunction with training programmes.

Tools for Self Reliance has a network of volunteers in the UK who refurbish donated tools and prepare kits suitable for use by trades people and small-scale enterprises in Africa. The main recipient countries are Tanzania, Uganda, Ghana, Zambia, Sierra Leone and Malawi.

Tools for Self Reliance was founded in 1980 and is based in Netley Marsh, Hampshire, and is a registered charity. Its patrons include Archbishop Desmond Tutu.

Tools for Self Reliance was a member of the anti-poverty campaign Make Poverty History in 2005. The Chief Executive Officer of Tools for Self Reliance is Sarah Ingleby.

== Early history ==
The original values behind the establishment of Tools for Self Reliance were outlined in a book, Questioning Development by Glyn Roberts. This argued that Northern volunteer-sending organisations should analyse "underdevelopment" in terms of power, and should act in solidarity with manual workers in the Third World. In November 1978, Roberts and other returned volunteers joined with students in Portsmouth in house-to-house collections of unwanted tools. In June 1979, a first consignment of 1,400 refurbished tools went (with shipment paid for by UNESCO's Youth Division) to SIDO, the Small Industries Development Organisation in Tanzania. Tanzania was selected because of its development philosophy and policies, outlined most notably in the Arusha Declaration (1967) by President Julius Nyerere. Many who got involved with Tools for Self Reliance found the principles inspiring. (One of these pioneers was Eddie Grimble who, thirty-four years later, is still actively involved!)

The tools idea took off very rapidly, with collecting and refurbishing groups forming in England, Wales and Scotland, and soon an influx of tools threatened to overwhelm the tiny volunteer administration based in Gosport. Much of 1979 and 1980 was spent trying to form an efficient yet democratic organisational structure for the NGO, and also seeking premises large enough to cope with the storage, refurbishment and shipping of tools. In 1980, Tools for Self Reliance was registered as a non-profit company and a year later, with support from Peter Gardner and the Minstead Lodge community, it raised a loan to buy a dilapidated property at Netley Marsh, near Southampton. It gained charitable status in 1982.

Throughout much of the 1980s Tools for Self Reliance struggled to survive, with 60-70 volunteer groups across the country putting in thousands of hours of practical and administrative work. Schools, universities, Rotarians and churches backed them up with tool collections, transport and money. Funds were always limited, though the situation occasionally improved thanks to a successful BBC Week's Good Cause appeal by Bishop Trevor Huddleston (1983), and support from Quaker and other foundations.

By the late 1980s and early 1990s most of these problems had diminished and the organisation was providing some 40-50,000 tools a year to seven countries in Africa and Central America. Tools for Self Reliance built up long-term partnerships with indigenous organisations as they, in turn, gave training and support to the young and unemployed, to women's groups, to disabled people and refugees. Another key area was the promotion of village (blacksmith) tool production and repair, and, through its overseas partners, Tools for Self Reliance sponsored tool-making competitions, conferences and exhibitions, at the district, national and international level.

Tools for Self Reliance always aimed to be more than a vehicle for technical assistance by insisting that simply providing tools and training will not solve worldwide poverty, which has deeper roots in the unfair distribution of power between and within nations. By the mid 1990s, similar organisations had formed in Europe, Australia and Japan, and Tools for Self Reliance was taking its message to international conferences such as the United Nations Conference on Environment and Development (Geneva, 1990) and the World Summit for Social Development in Copenhagen (1995).
