= Bartley Lodge =

Coordinates: 50°54′59″N 1°34′38″W

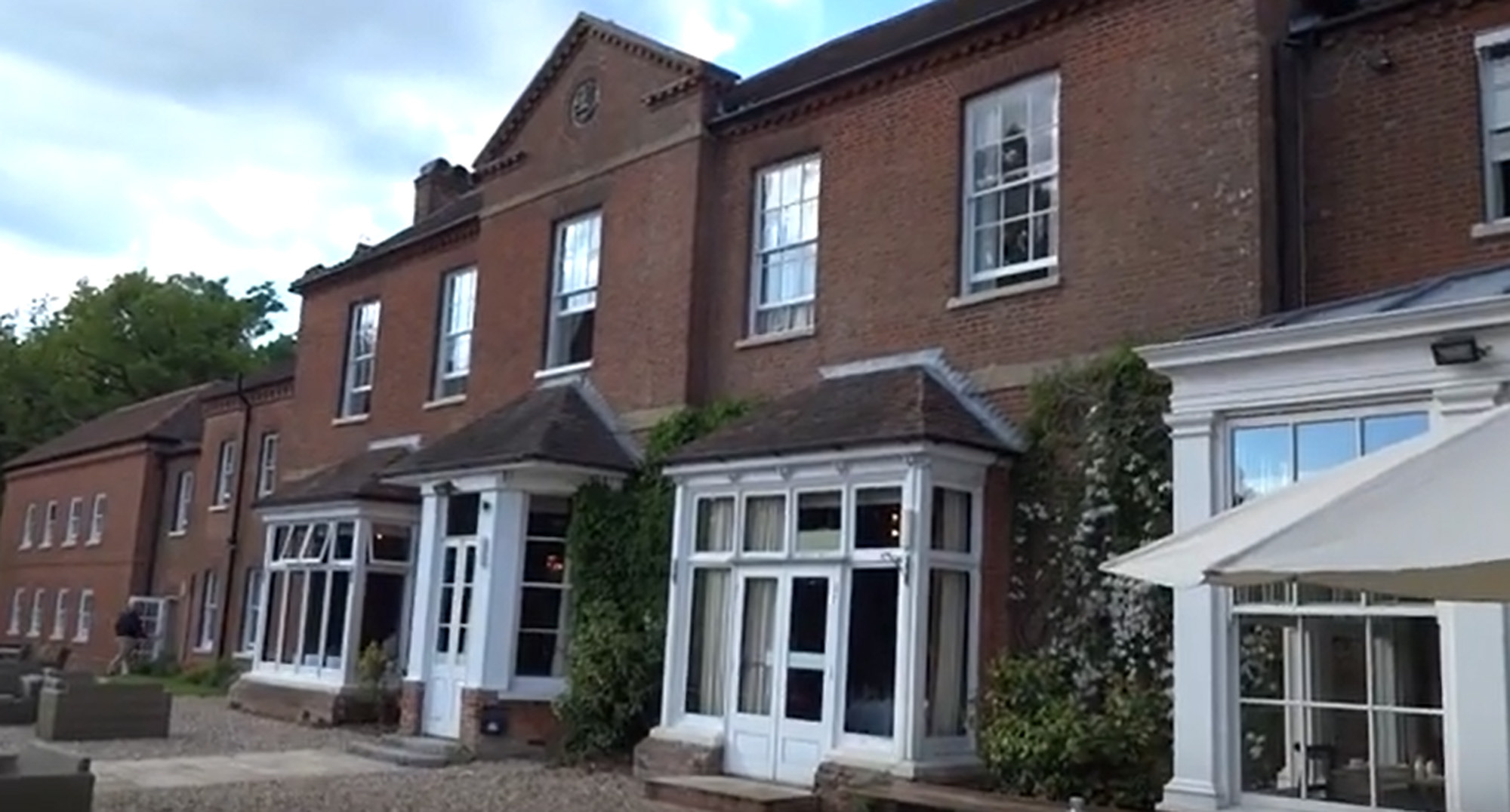
Bartley Lodge

Bartley Lodge is a country house near Cadnam in Hampshire, England, within the boundaries of the New Forest National Park. It was built in the 18th century to take advantage of the hunting offered in the surrounding New Forest. Most famously, the eminent geologist Sir Charles Lyell spent his childhood here. The building is now a hotel.

== Early residents ==
Edward Gilbert, the Deputy Surveyor General of his Majesty's Woods and Forests, and large landowner appears to have built the house in about 1770. At this time it was called “Lamb’s Corner”. In his memoirs the Reverend Richard Warner remembers visiting Edward's son Vincent Hawkins Gilbert at this property and says “Mr Gilbert’s father had built a very pleasant mansion on his property at “Lamb’s Corner” but died just previous to its completion”. Edward died in the 1770s so it is about this time that the Lodge was constructed.

Edward Gilbert was born in 1718. In 1752 he married Mary Hawkins who was the daughter of Vincent Hawkins, the owner of land in Lyndhurst. In 1856 he was appointed Deputy Surveyor General of his Majesty's Woods and Forests. He acquired a considerable amount of property in the New Forest area including his wife's inherited estate in Lyndhurst. The couple had only one son Vincent Hawkins Gilbert (1752-1798) who was the first Master of the New Forest Foxhounds. There is a portrait of him by Daniel Gardner with Sir William Heathcote and his son.

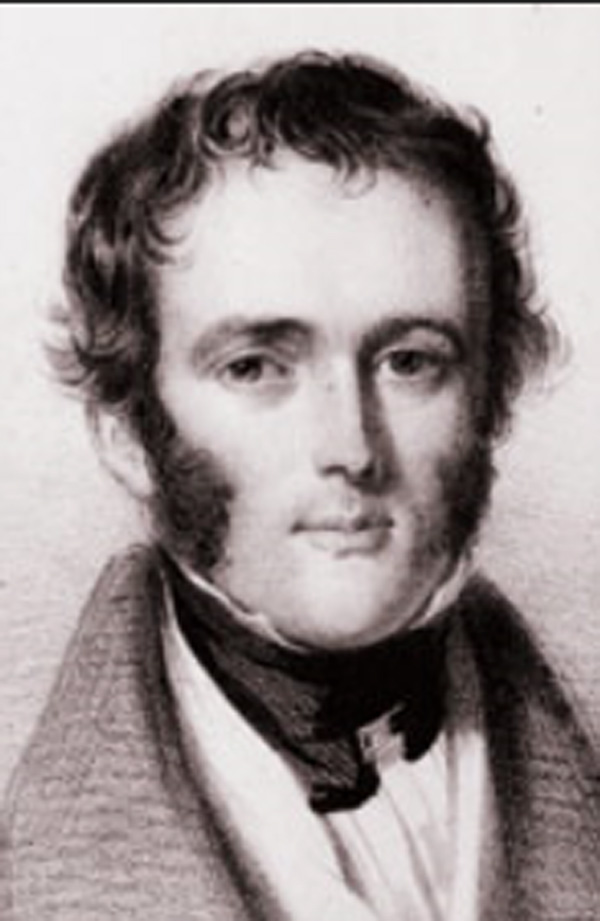
Sir Charles Lyell (1797–1875)

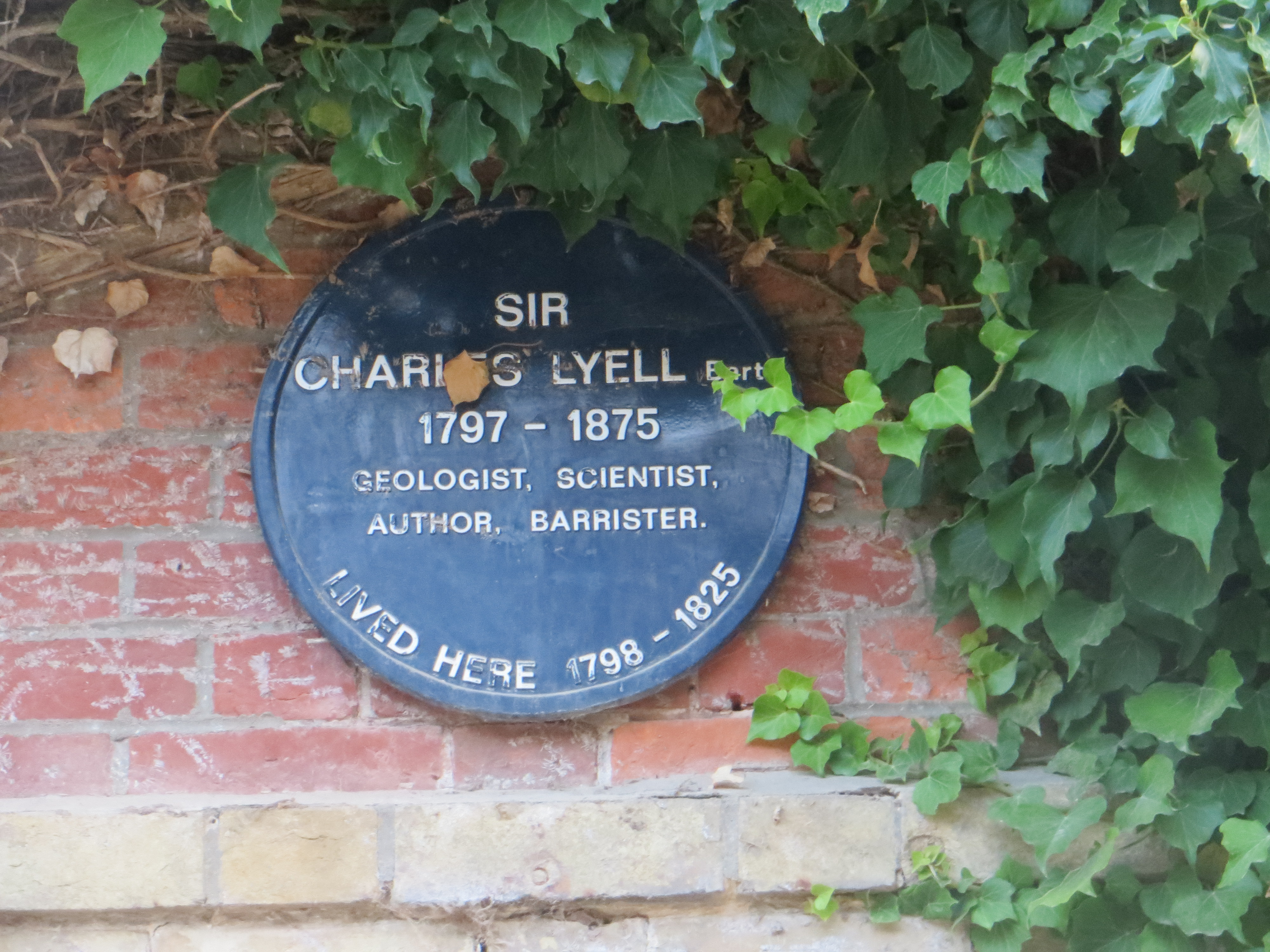
Plaque commemorating Sir Charles Lyell's childhood at Bartley Lodge.

He died in 1798 and left Bartley Lodge to his son Major Edward Gilbert (1784-1868). It was shortly after his father's death that Major Gilbert let the property to the Charles Lyell (1767–1849) who was a notable botanist who stayed there with his family for the next 28 years. Their family seat was Kinnordy House, Angus, Scotland.

Sir Charles Lyell (1797–1875), the famous geologist, was a member of this family and spent most of his childhood there. He wrote an autobiography in which he frequently mentions Bartley Lodge. He said

"We lived at Bartley and walked out among that beautiful wild forest with the nurses...Bartley belonged to a Major Gilbert, and consisted of eighty English acres, seventy of which was laid down in grass, and produced hay, which was celebrated as the best in the county for the hunters — for Lyndhurst was only two miles off where the New Forest hounds were kept. The hay harvest, therefore, was a great concern at Bartley, and when we returned home for each summer holiday the mowing was always just beginning. We (Tom and I) used to attend the mowers all day, and learnt to mow a little, and used to tumble about with Marianne and Fanny in the haycocks, and ride in the loaded wagons to the haystack. It lasted the greater part of our five or six weeks' holidays, as part of the land was always three weeks later in being cut. I have always since thought haymaking the most delightful of sights. We always had our small rakes and forks, and used to try how much we could glean after the wagon. As the whole of this grass land was unenclosed, and surrounded the house, it made a good-sized park, and was full of fine old oaks."

Major Edward Gilbert married Jane Ludlow in 1828 and for some years they lived at Bartley lodge but they often rented it to wealthy tenants for long periods. In 1837 he rented it for a year to the Shore family. Their eldest daughter Emily Shore wrote a diary which is highly regarded today. A whole section of the diary tells of her time at Bartley Lodge. She describes the drawing room and two of the bedrooms in the following terms.

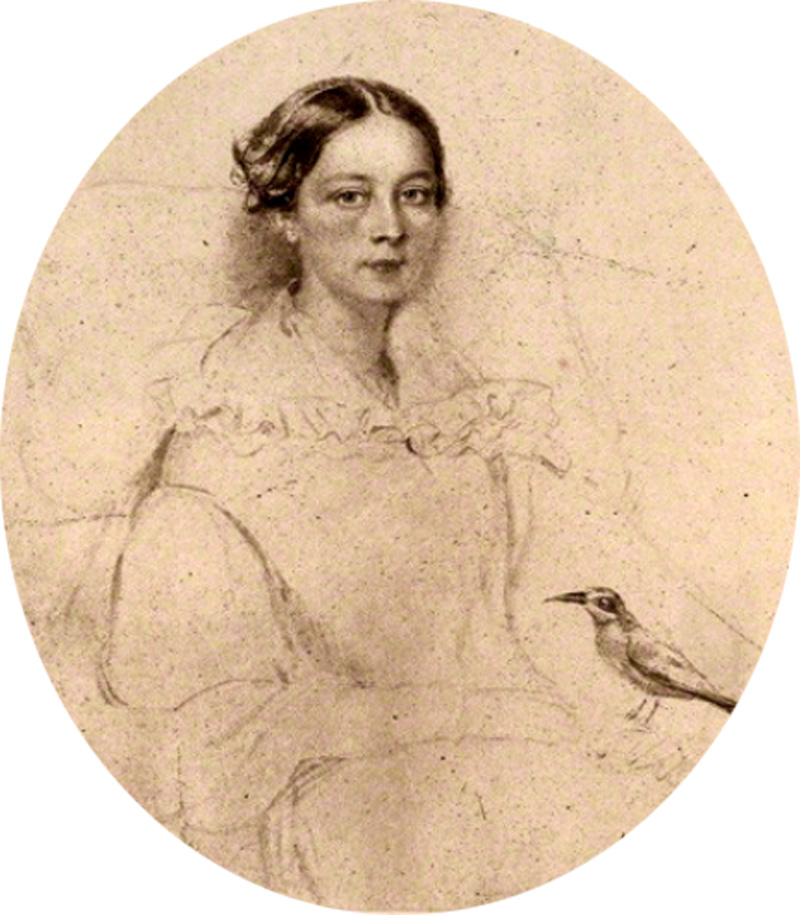
Emily Shore

"The first is a large lofty room, twenty-four feet long. I like it better than that at Woodbury. It has a pretty light paper, a very handsome, old- fashioned, carved chimney-piece, and two windows. Mamma's room is just the same size. Mine I quite love. It is at the back of the house, and has two windows looking out into the garden and forest beyond."

She describes part of the front of the house as follows.

""I sat out of doors for an hour or two in the afternoon, in a little sheltered spot in front of the house, before the eastern wing, which recedes a few feet back. It is a very small piece of grass, between rhododendrons on one side, and laurustinus on the other, with the wall of the house covered with jessamines behind. In front is the park and forest so that altogether it is a sweet little spot, and I enjoyed sitting here very much. It was a calm, delicious day, the forest bathed in sunlight, the sky a pure pale blue. On my left, close to the wall of the house, is an oak grey with lichens. Here I watched the merry ox-eyes flitting from twig to twig, and tapping them with head downwards and the handsome nuthatch, with his loud clear whistle, running up the boughs like a mouse, and hammering at them with all the concentrated force of his powerful body. In the herbage of the park, I heard the mingled tinkling warble of a dozen goldfinches the sweet song of the robin sounded from tree to tree. From the forest arose a few melodious notes of the thrush, and the loud laugh of the green woodpecker. A pied wagtail with his cheerful "chippeet" alighted on the roof of the house above me a lark flew across the park, uttering his pretty plaintive cry. In the garden, the scream of the jay and the chattering of jackdaws completed the gay, though not always melodious, concert."

The Shores advertised the contents for sale in December 1838 as they were leaving the country.

== Later residents ==
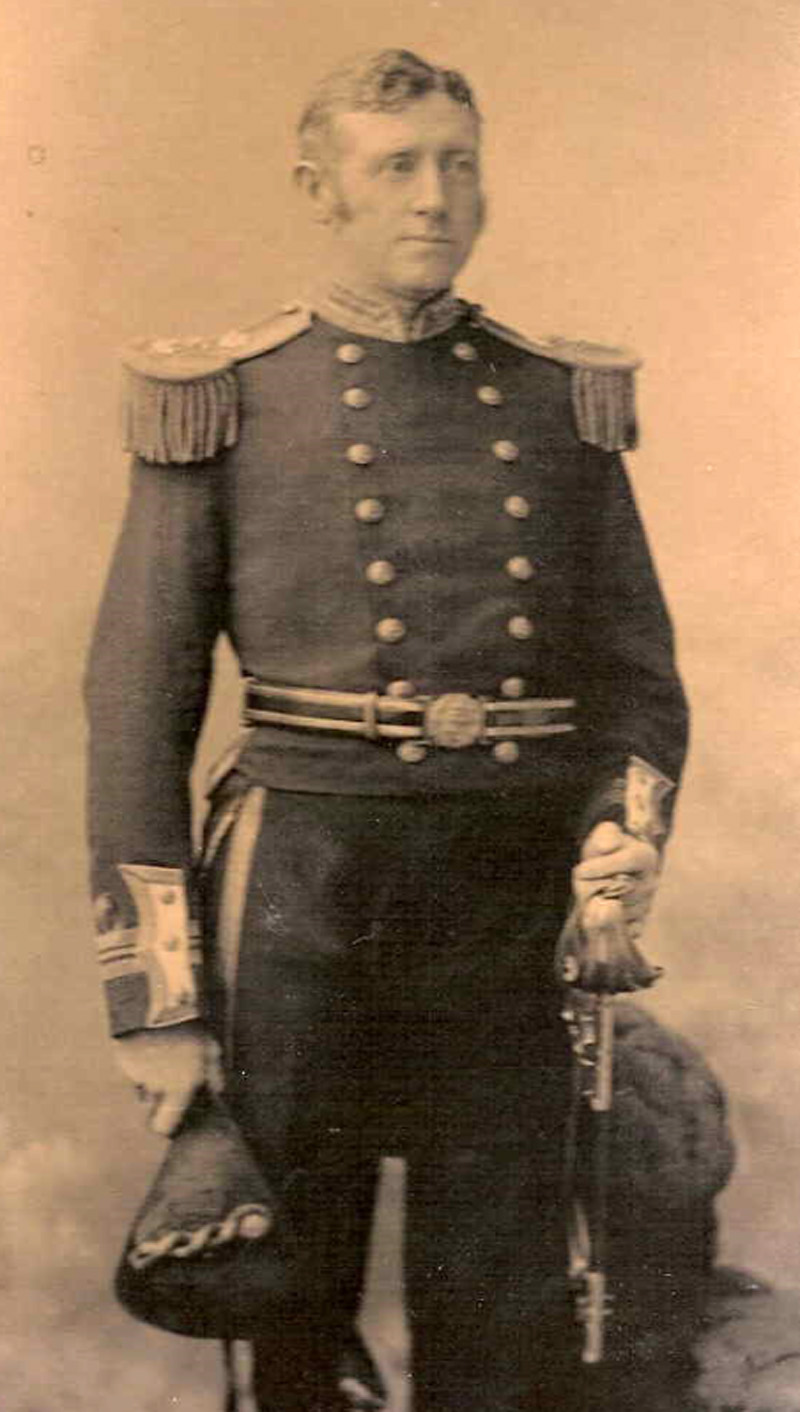
Lieutenant Frederick George Innes Lillingston

Major Edward Gilbert died in 1868 and the house was rented periodically for the next twelve years. It was put on the market in 1879 including "two prettily designed lodges from the Lyndhurst-road and Bartley-green". Both these old roads can still be traced on foot. Old Lyndhurst Road was rerouted to the present roundabout leaving the old road as a straight track across the north west of the estate. The Bartley Green road is now a gated Forestry Commission track and the former drive from there to the house is disused and heavily overgrown.

In 1880 the house was bought by Frederick George Innes Lillingston who with his family lived there until 1891. Lillingston (1849-1904) was a lieutenant in the Royal Navy. He was born in 1849 and was the only son of Isaac William Lillingston. His father owned the large estate of Lochalsh in Scotland and Balmacara House. In 1871 he married Frances Elizabeth O’Brien and the couple had nine children. He made extension to the house to accommodate his large family. However, in 1891 he decided to sell the property and move to Torquay. It was purchased by Major Francis Bertram Dalrymple.

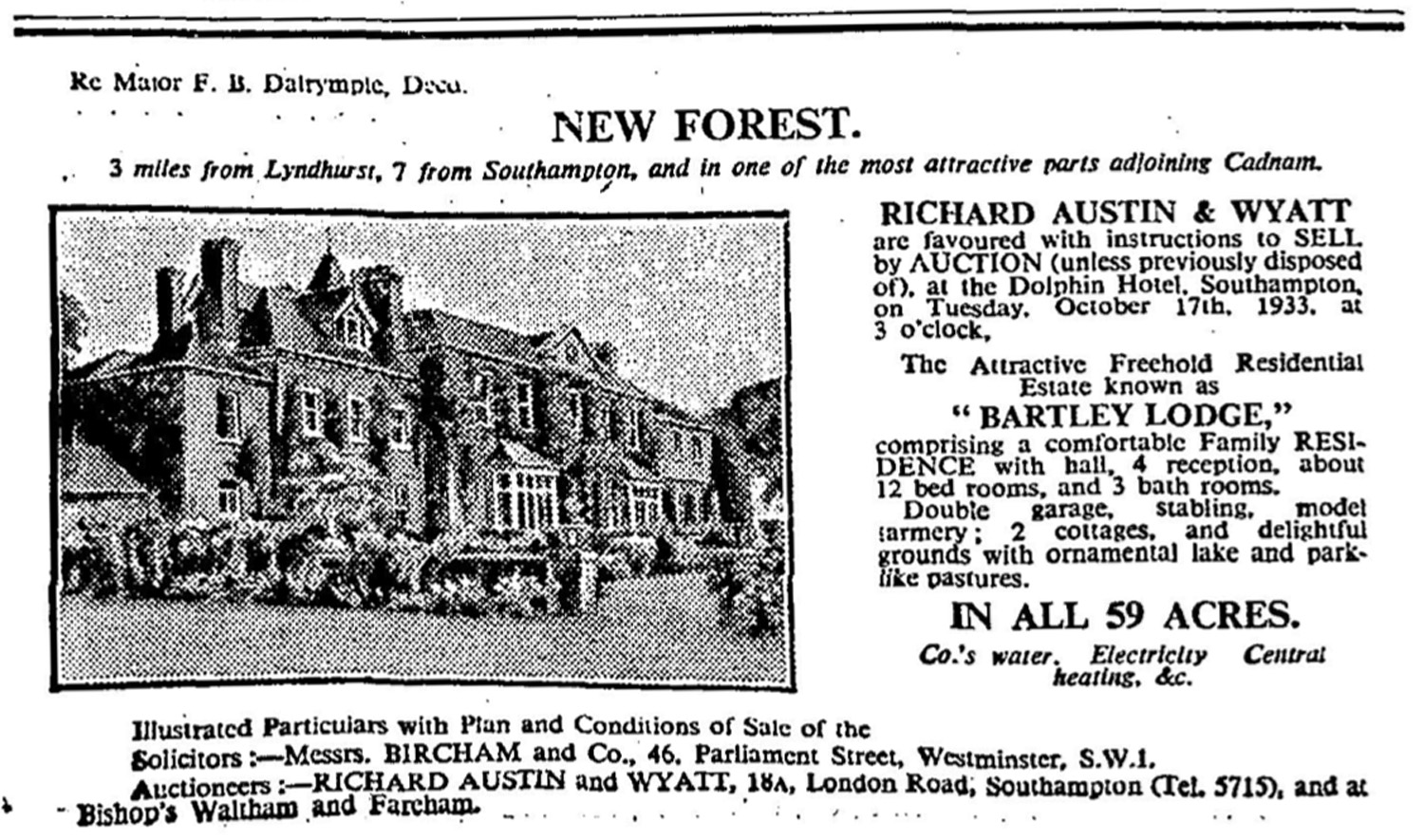
Sale notice for Bartley Lodge 1933

Francis Bertram Dalrymple (1850-1932) was a major in the Royal Artillery. He was born in 1850 in Paddington. His father was Robert Farre Dalrymple, a wealthy London lawyer. He was married twice. His first wife Anna Gertrude Hope whom he married in 1878 died in 1895. Three years later he married Alice Maud Everett. Major Dalrymple was a keen horticulturalist and in 1899 he and his head gardener formed the Bartley Horticultural Society. Each year a flower show was held at Bartley Lodge and was hailed as the finest show in the New Forest. The Horticultural Society still exists today and holds an annual show. Major Dalrymple died in 1932 and the house was put on the Market for £10000, it was sold in 1935 for £5000.

The next owner was Philip Henley Dodgson, who lived there with his family until 1961. Dodgson (1892-1961) was born in 1892, the son of Henley Frederick Dodgson. He attended Winchester College and was admitted to Trinity College, Cambridge in 1910. He received his BA in Law/Political Economy in 1913. During the First World War he served as a captain in the Royal Field Artillery and was awarded the Military Cross. In 1918 he married Eveline Fulton and the couple had three children. He died in 1961 and Eveline continued to live at Bartley Lodge until her death in 1972. The property was then sold and converted to a hotel.
