= Hounsdown School =

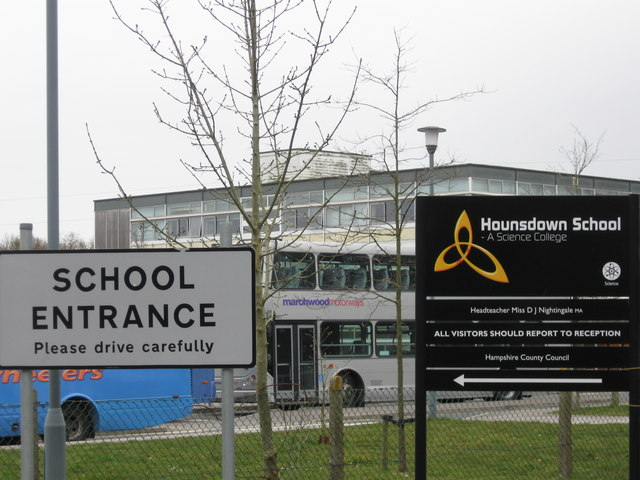

Location
- Jacobs Gutter Lane; Totton; Southampton; Southampton, Hampshire, SO40 9FT; England; 50.904687°N 1.492459°W

Information
- Type: Academy
- Motto: 'Be The Best That You Can Be'
- Established: 1969
- Local authority: Hampshire
- Specialist: Science/IT
- Department for Education URN: 137229 Tables
- Ofsted: Reports
- Chair of Governors: John Lewis
- Headteacher: David Veal
- Staff: 150
- Gender: Co-educational
- Age: 11 to 16
- Enrolment: 1240
- Houses: Beaulieu, Rhinefield, Knightwood, Bolderwood
- Colours: Black, Gold, Blue, Red, Purple, Green
- Website: https://www.hounsdown.hants.sch.uk/

Hounsdown School is a secondary school in Totton, near Southampton, Hampshire, England The school has 1,240 pupils, spanning ages 11 to 16. Classes are held in renovated 1960s buildings and new specialist blocks built since 2000.

== Science College and Academy status ==
Hounsdown gained Science College status in 2005, and the school changed its official title to 'Hounsdown School – A Science College'. With the new title came a new logo, new uniform and a £500,000 government grant to be spent on science equipment.

On 1 August 2011, Hounsdown School officially gained academy status.

== Ofsted ==
The school's most recent Ofsted inspection judgement, in 2024, was Good.

== Department for Education Investment ==
In May 2013, Hounsdown School was successful in achieving approximately £1.3 million for essential Capital refurbishments/decorating works.

== Structure ==
Pupils begin at the school in year seven, most having attended one of the three feeder primary schools: Abbotswood Junior School (majority), Bartley Junior School or Foxhills Junior School. Until KS3 SATs were abandoned nationally, pupils studied the Key Stage 3 syllabus until the SATs. In 2005, instead of taking SATs in year nine, the decision was taken that students would take them in year 8 to give students an extra year of GCSE help. They then pick a cycle of three subjects at the end of year 8 (e.g. drama, music, history) and a language to carry on into year nine. Students then try out these subjects and pick their final GCSE options at the end of year nine, which they could drop at any time during year 10. Many schools in Scotland and Wales use a more traditional system, which, in year nine, has pupils consolidating their learning from primary school and KS3. GCSE courses start for all subjects in year 10, with the examinations held during the summer term of year 11. Pupils can then enter employment, or continue their education at 6th Form College.

Colleges which most students go onto from Hounsdown are Totton, and Brockenhurst.

== Key Stage Four ==
Unlike most schools, pupils at Hounsdown start studying for their GCSE in year nine, rather than year 10. The pupils choose their GCSE options at the end of year eight, but they can be changed at the start of year 9 at the pupil's behest. Compulsory subjects including Science, Mathematics, English, a language and Religious Education (also known as Ethics & Beliefs) although this may be subject to change. Students were previously required to take one course from the Design and Technology category but these are no longer compulsory.

Most students take their final GCSE exams in Year 11 but some students take them in Year 10 for particular subjects. Coursework, commonly associated with subjects such as Art and Design and Technology, is also accounted towards their final GCSE grades.

== Learning Resource centre ==
The Resources Centre provides a wide range of materials for pupils to use for their coursework in different subjects. The Resources Centre is involved with the Hampshire Book Award, and pupils regularly review new books for the school's library service.

The library keeps audio tapes, CDs, and computers, the latter of which include word-processing programs. Photocopying and document-production is also available at the library. The Library has movie editing facilities and has a range of Technical Resources.

== Facilities/ Sport ==
The school provides for hire a swimming pool, two rugby pitches, two football pitches, their classrooms, the sports hall and the Library (Resources Centre). The Main hall provides a large and flexible staging area where concerts and productions are regularly performed, and is also equipped with lighting and PA theatre equipment. The School provides 6 ICT suites and in early 2013, the school applied for funding for an Apple Mac suite, now situated in the Art block. The Library (Resources Centre) was refurbished in 2009 and provides a vast array of books, as well as 50 Networked computers, and a number of Apple Macs. The school has 10 science laboratories, a sports hall and 3 Drama studios and a dance studio, each fitted with multi-fixture lighting rigs and PA systems, also used for lower scale productions. In 2014, the East Block was completed of Re-cladding, a brand-new purpose built Dance Studio was built next to the Sports Hall and the Music areas were refurbished with the inclusion of a new recording studio for GCSE work and professional standard compositions. In 2020 a new history block was established and has now been completed, no temporary classrooms were needed as the new state-of-the-art block was built in a different area of the school grounds.

== Hounsdown Eco-School status ==
Hounsdown has an eco-school system that consists of 72 representatives (2 from each tutor group). There is an eco-school club that runs every Monday at lunchtime, which is led by the science department's community links class teacher and is run mainly by the lead team that consists of pupils from all years that have shown a high interest in Eco schools. The school has won the bronze and silver awards and achieved the green flag which was raised on 22 October 2009.

=== Organic garden project ===
The Organic Garden Project is a project funded by the Young Roots Lottery fund. The project is a pupil-led, fully functional organic garden behind the drama and sports hall it was opened by Chris Packham in 2009.
