= Bartley Water =

River in Hampshire, England

Coordinates: 50°54′42″N 1°28′49″W

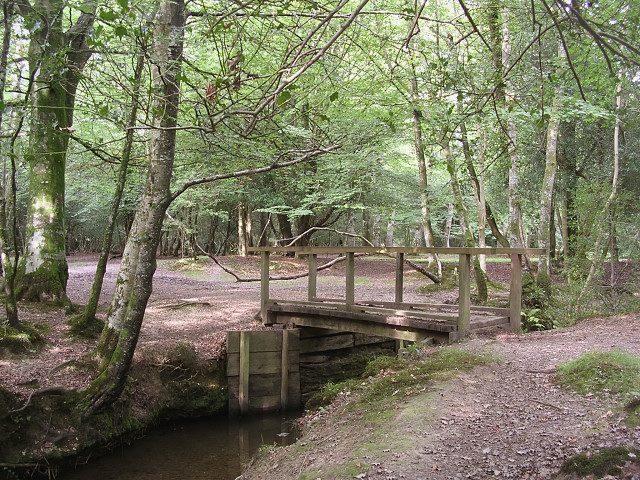
- west of Busketts Lawn Inclosure

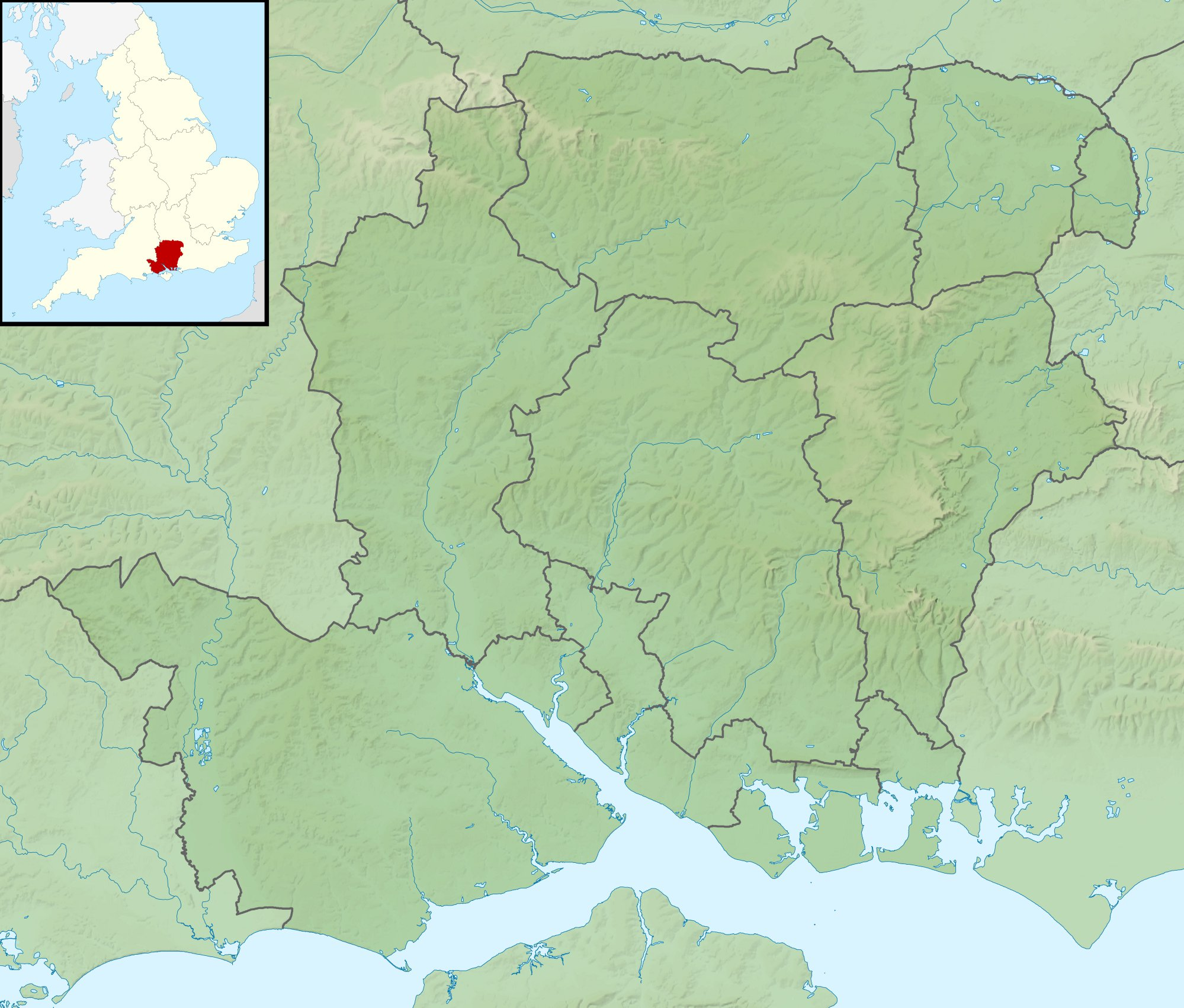
- Bartley Water Confluence of both its branches (Southeast England)

Bartley Water is a two-branch small river in the New Forest district of Hampshire, England. It drains the north and northeast of the New Forest National Park up to the A31 road, a watershed and two villages against the northeast side of the park.

Its two upper branches unite in Bartley from where it flows northeast to Eling and becomes a narrow tidal estuary into the Southampton Water which is an arm of the Solent.

The tidal part of the river (but not the natural low water flow) drives the working historic Eling Tide Mill at Eling, where a toll road crosses the river.

The river is also an important recreational and wildlife haven, especially at the tidal, Eling end of the river. Despite being shallow in many places, the stream is home to brown and rainbow trout that average about 10 to 12 inches (25 to 30 cm) long.

Its furthest source is the Mill Stream, which is the main contributor to its south branch and rises northwest of Lyndhurst, Hampshire.
