= Totton =

Town in Hampshire, England

Coordinates: 50.918879°N 1.4887938°W

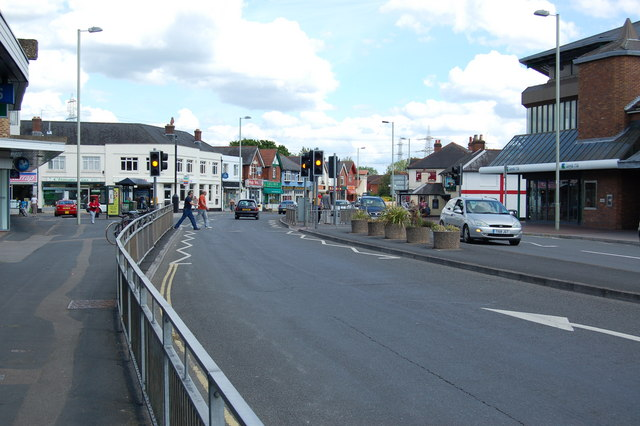

- Location within Hampshire
- Area: 7.072 km^{2} (2.731 sq mi)
- Population: 28,094 (2021 census)
  - Density: 3,973/km^{2} (10,290/sq mi)
- Civil parish: Totton and Eling
- District: New Forest
- Shire county: Hampshire
- Region: South East
- Country: England
- Sovereign state: United Kingdom
- Post town: SOUTHAMPTON
- Postcode district: SO40
- Dialling code: 023
- Police: Hampshire and Isle of Wight
- Fire: Hampshire and Isle of Wight
- Ambulance: South Central
- UK Parliament: New Forest East

Totton is a town in the civil parish of Totton and Eling, in the New Forest district of Hampshire, England. In 2021 it had a population of 28,094.

== History ==
The name "Totton" means 'Tot(r)ingtun' farm of 'Tot(t)a', "Totton was "Totinctone" in 985 and "Totyngton" in 1174-1199. Totton was recorded in the Domesday Book as Dodintune.

Totton claimed to be the largest village in England until it was made a town in 1974. The town is often considered to be made up of several smaller villages, such as Testwood, Calmore and Hammonds Green (as well as the original village of Totton) which have been connected by new clusters of housing to form the town as it is today. This is backed up by the presence of several areas of local shops, which served their respective villages in the past, and to an extent still do today. Until the 1967 forest perambulation fencing, New Forest ponies were free to roam its streets. The town's built up area has swollen significantly since the later half of the 20th century and now forms a near continuous web of development with surrounding villages, with Ower, Netley Marsh and Ashurst in particular having little or no discernible distinction in built up area.

Totton's town centre has changed little since the 1970s. Commercial Road and the A35 causeway are the main exit routes from the town.

=== Early history ===
The Iron Age Hillfort at Tatchbury Mount is evidence of early settlement in the Totton area and Netley Marsh on the edge of Totton was the site of an early battle between Anglo Saxon invaders under Cerdic and Romano-Celtic peoples under Natanleod. The construction of Testwood Lakes revealed a treasure-trove of ancient artefacts including one of the oldest known bridges in England, believed to date to around c.1,500BC.

Totton Appears on the "Hantoniae sive Sovthantonensis Comitatvs" map in Joan Blaeu's Atlas Major Vol. 5 Published in 1665

The area's history is inevitably closely connected with ship and boat building but more with its timber trade. It was the site of much illegal dealing in the timber unlawfully obtained from the New Forest.
