= New Forest East =

UK Parliament constituency (since 1997)

Coordinates: 50.820°N 1.467°W

- County constituency for the House of Commons
- Boundaries since 2010
- Boundary of New Forest East in South East England
- County: Hampshire
- Electorate: 73,823 (2023)
- Major settlements: Brockenhurst, Totton, Hythe, Ashurst

Current constituency
- Created: 1997
- Member of Parliament: Julian Lewis (Conservative)
- Seats: One
- Created from: Romsey and Waterside; New Forest

New Forest East is a constituency (Note: A county constituency (for the purposes of election expenses and type of returning officer)) in Hampshire represented in the House of Commons of the UK Parliament since its creation in 1997 by Julian Lewis of the Conservative Party. (Note: As with all constituencies, the constituency elects one Member of Parliament (MP) by the first past the post system of election at least every five years.)

== Constituency profile ==
New Forest East is a constituency in Hampshire. It covers the towns and villages on west bank of Southampton Water and most of the sparsely-populated New Forest National Park. Its largest town is Totton, which has a population of around 28,000. Other settlements include the town of Hythe and the villages of Marchwood, Lyndhurst, Brockenhurst, Sway, Holbury and Blackfield.

Totton is a mostly suburban town with average levels of wealth. Much of the town, which is separated from the city of Southampton by the River Test, was developed in the late 20th century. To the south are large industrial estates; Marchwood has a military port and electricity generation facilities, and adjacent to Holbury is Fawley Refinery, the largest oil refinery in the United Kingdom. The inland villages within the New Forest are generally affluent. Beaulieu is popular with tourists and is the location of the National Motor Museum. House prices across the constituency are generally higher than the national and South East England averages.

New Forest East is home to a large retiree population. Residents have high rates of homeownership and average levels of education. Household income is above average and there is a low rate of child poverty. A high proportion of residents work in the manufacturing and tourism sectors and a low percentage claim unemployment benefits. White people made up 97% of the population at the 2021 census.

At the local council level, the inland areas are mostly represented by Conservatives whilst more Liberal Democrats were elected in the east, especially in Hythe. An estimated 59% of voters in New Forest East supported leaving the European Union in the 2016 referendum, higher than the nationwide figure of 52%.

== Boundaries ==
1997–2010: The District of New Forest wards of Blackfield and Langley, Boldre, Brockenhurst, Colbury, Copythorne South, Dibden and Hythe North, Dibden Purlieu, Fawley Holbury, Forest North, Forest South, Hythe South, Lyndhurst, Marchwood, Netley Marsh, Totton Central, Totton North, and Totton South.

2010–2023: The District of New Forest wards of Ashurst, Copythorne South and Netley Marsh, Boldre and Sway, Bramshaw, Copythorne North and Minstead, Brockenhurst and Forest South East, Butts Ash and Dibden Purlieu, Dibden and Hythe East, Fawley, Blackfield and Langley, Furzedown and Hardley, Holbury and North Blackfield, Hythe West and Langdown, Lyndhurst, Marchwood, Totton Central, Totton East, Totton North, Totton South, and Totton West.

2023–present: Following a review of local authority ward boundaries, which became effective in May 2023, the constituency now comprises the following:

- The District of New Forest wards of: Ashurst, Bramshaw, Copythorne & Netley Marsh; Brockenhurst & Denny Lodge; Dibden & Dibden Purlieu; Fawley, Blackfield, Calshot & Langley; Forest & Solent; Hardley, Holbury & North Blackfield; Hythe Central; Hythe South; Lyndhurst & Minstead; Marchwood & Eling; Sway; Totton Central; Totton North; Totton South.

The 2023 Periodic Review of Westminster constituencies, which was based on the ward structure in place at 1 December 2020, left the boundaries unchanged.

== History ==
This constituency was created when the old New Forest constituency was divided for the 1997 general election. All election results but one since its creation suggest that it is a Conservative safe seat. The 2001 election produced a marginal victory when the Liberal Democrats came within 4,000 votes of winning, closer than any challengers since.

== Members of Parliament ==
New Forest and Romsey & Waterside prior to 1997

Election	Member	Party
1997	Sir Julian Lewis	Conservative
July 2020	Sir Julian Lewis	Independent
December 2020	Sir Julian Lewis	Conservative

== Elections ==
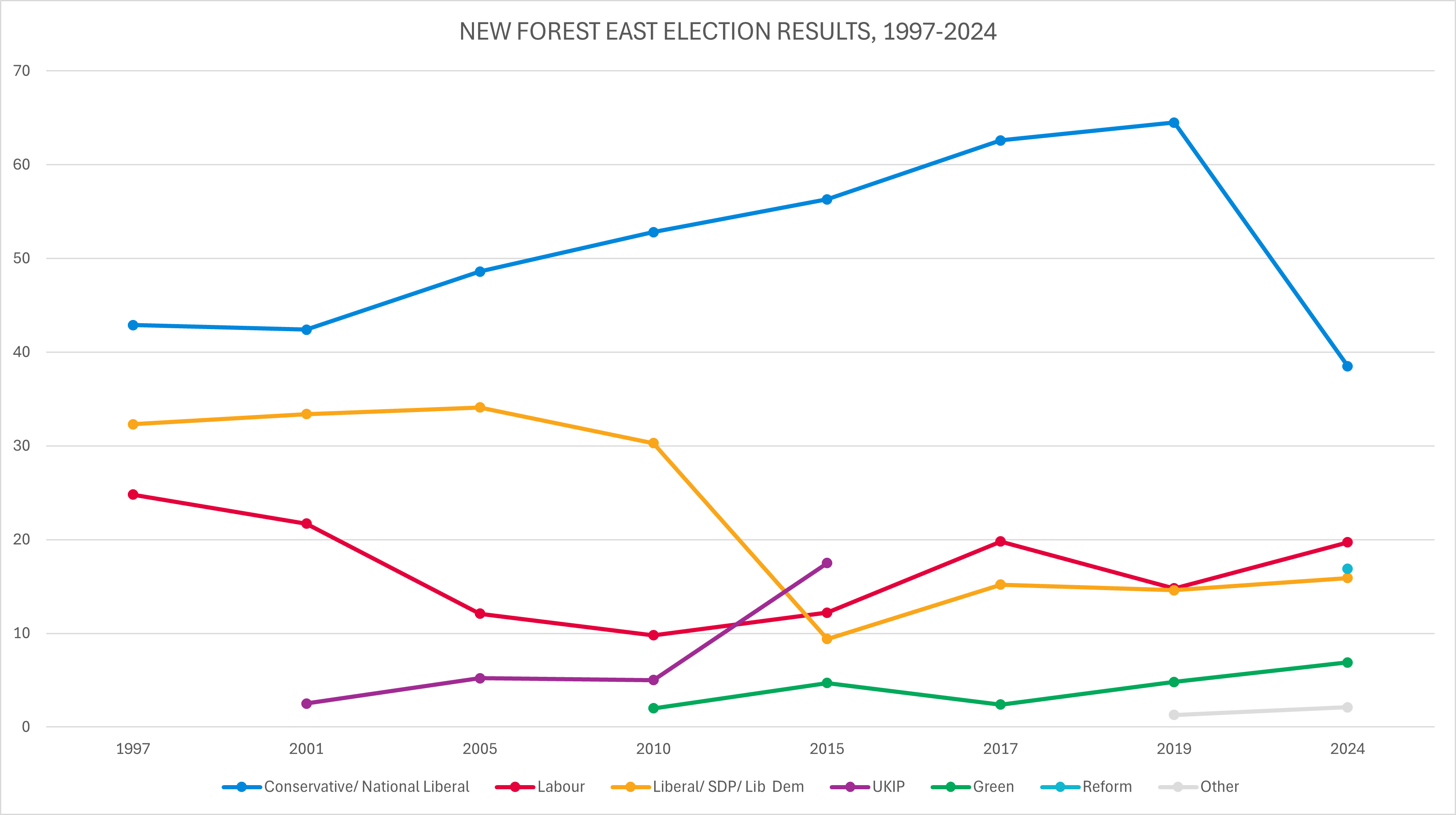
Election results 1997-2024

=== Elections in the 2020s ===
General election 2024: New Forest East
Party	Candidate	Votes	%	±%
Conservative	Julian Lewis	17,412	38.5	−26.0
Labour	Sasjkia Otto	8,917	19.7	+4.9
Reform	Roy Swales	7,646	16.9	N/A
Liberal Democrats	Caroline Rackham	7,198	15.9	+1.3
Green	Simon King	3,118	6.9	+2.1
Monster Raving Loony	Mad Hatter	529	1.2	N/A
Animal Welfare	Andrew Knight	410	0.9	−0.4
Majority		8,495	18.8	−30.9
Turnout		45,230	64.0	−4.8
Registered electors		70,618		
Conservative hold		Swing	−15.5	

=== Elections in the 2010s ===
General election 2019: New Forest East
Party	Candidate	Votes	%	±%
Conservative	Julian Lewis	32,769	64.5	+1.9
Labour	Julie Hope	7,518	14.8	−5.0
Liberal Democrats	Bob Johnston	7,390	14.6	−0.6
Green	Nicola Jolly	2,434	4.8	+2.4
Animal Welfare	Andrew Knight	675	1.3	N/A
Majority		25,251	49.7	+6.9
Turnout		50,786	69.0	−2.4
Conservative hold		Swing	+3.45	

General election 2017: New Forest East
Party	Candidate	Votes	%	±%
Conservative	Julian Lewis	32,162	62.6	+6.3
Labour	Julie Renyard	10,167	19.8	+7.6
Liberal Democrats	David Harrison	7,786	15.2	+5.8
Green	Henry Mellor	1,251	2.4	−2.3
Majority		21,995	42.8	+4.0
Turnout		51,366	71.4	+3.4
Conservative hold		Swing	−0.6	

General election 2015: New Forest East
Party	Candidate	Votes	%	±%
Conservative	Julian Lewis	27,819	56.3	+3.5
UKIP	Roy Swales	8,657	17.5	+12.5
Labour	Andrew Pope	6,018	12.2	+2.4
Liberal Democrats	Bruce Tennent	4,626	9.4	−20.8
Green	Sally May	2,327	4.7	+2.7
Majority		19,162	38.8	+16.2
Turnout		49,447	68.0	−0.7
Conservative hold		Swing	+11.2	

General election 2010: New Forest East
Party	Candidate	Votes	%	±%
Conservative	Julian Lewis	26,443	52.8	+3.4
Liberal Democrats	Terry Scriven	15,136	30.3	−3.1
Labour	Peter W.J. Sopowski	4,915	9.8	−2.4
UKIP	Peter A. Day	2,518	5.0	−0.1
Green	Beverley J. Golden	1,024	2.0	N/A
Majority		11,307	22.6	+8.1
Turnout		50,036	68.7	+2.6
Conservative hold		Swing	+3.2	

=== Elections in the 2000s ===
General election 2005: New Forest East
Party	Candidate	Votes	%	±%
Conservative	Julian Lewis	21,975	48.6	+6.2
Liberal Democrats	Brian Dash	15,424	34.1	+0.7
Labour	Stephen Roberts	5,492	12.1	−9.6
UKIP	Katy Davies	2,344	5.2	+2.7
Majority		6,551	14.5	+5.5
Turnout		45,235	65.9	+2.7
Conservative hold		Swing	+2.7	

General election 2001: New Forest East
Party	Candidate	Votes	%	±%
Conservative	Julian Lewis	17,902	42.4	−0.5
Liberal Democrats	Brian Dash	14,073	33.4	+1.1
Labour	Alan Goodfellow	9,141	21.7	−3.1
UKIP	William Howe	1,062	2.5	N/A
Majority		3,829	9.0	−1.6
Turnout		42,178	63.2	−11.4
Conservative hold		Swing	−0.8	

=== Elections in the 1990s ===
General election 1997: New Forest East
Party	Candidate	Votes	%	±%
Conservative	Julian Lewis	21,053	42.9	
Liberal Democrats	George Dawson	15,838	32.3	
Labour	Alan Goodfellow	12,161	24.8	
Majority		5,215	10.6	
Turnout		49,052	74.6	
Conservative win (new seat)				

== See also ==
- List of parliamentary constituencies in Hampshire
- List of parliamentary constituencies in the South East England (region)

== Sources ==
- Election result, 2005 (BBC)
- Election results, 1997 - 2001 (BBC)
- Election results, 1997–2001 (Election Demon)
- Election results, 1997 - 2005 (Guardian)
