= A36 road =

Major road in south-west England

A36

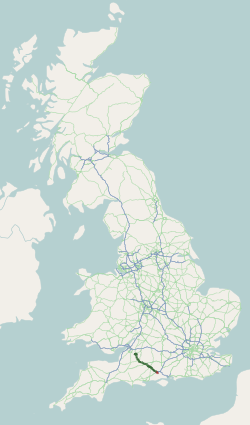

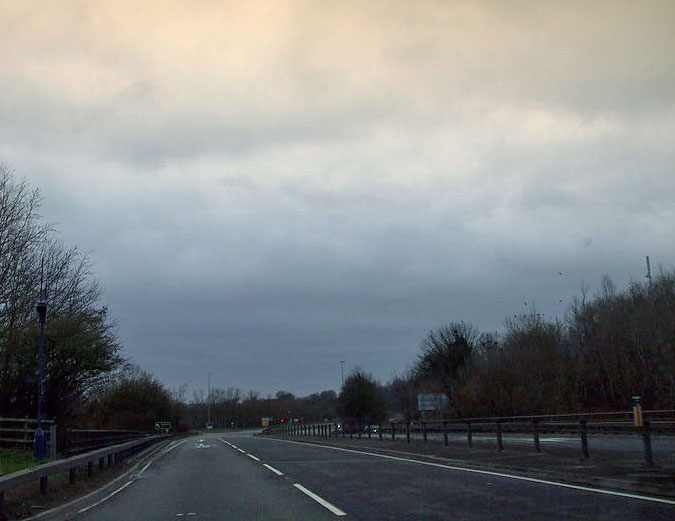
- A36 close to its junction with the A303

Route information
- Length: 63.7 mi (102.5 km)

Major junctions
- North end: A4 near Bath
- A361 near Beckington A350 near Warminster A303 at Deptford; A30 near Salisbury A338 in Salisbury M27 near Totton
- South end: A35 in Totton

Location
- Country: United Kingdom
- Primary destinations: Warminster; Salisbury; Southampton; Bath

Road network
- Roads in the United Kingdom; Motorways; A and B road zones
← A35	→ A37

The A36 is a trunk road and primary route in southwest England that links the port city of Southampton to the city of Bath. At Bath, the A36 connects with the A4 to Bristol, thus providing a road link between the major ports of Southampton and Bristol. It also provides a link between Bristol and London via the A303.

== Route ==
Originally, the A36 continued to Avonmouth, beyond Bristol, but this section was renumbered to the A4.

Within Bath the A36 acts as a ring road on the southern side of the river, from the junction with the A4 at Newbridge to the west of the city. From here traffic can continue to Bristol on the A4 or to Wells and Weston-super-Mare via the A39 and A368 roads. Another link to the A4 on the eastern side at Cleveland Bridge, which provides a route to the M4 motorway via the A46, is highly congested. Plans for a direct link road connecting the A36 with the A46 have been under consideration for a number of years.

The A36 leaves Bath in an easterly direction towards Bathampton, then turns south to follow the Avon through its steep-sided valley, climbing out of the valley beyond Limpley Stoke. The road passes near a number of towns and a city, including Frome, Warminster, Wilton and Salisbury in Wiltshire, and Totton in Hampshire, on the western outskirts of Southampton, where it meets the M27 motorway and the A35.

== Standard of route ==
The majority of the A36 is built to single carriageway standard, but parts of it have been upgraded to dual carriageway. The A36 is dual carriageway for its 1 mile (1.6 km) bypass of the village of Beckington, 3 miles (5 km), briefly combined with the A361 north of Frome. It shares part of Warminster bypass with the A350. It is also dualled for approximately 1 mile (1.6 km) near its grade separated junction with the A303 road, 8 miles (13 km) north-west of Wilton.

The A36 in Salisbury acts as the city's ring road, bypassing the city centre to dual carriageway standard. Just south-east of Salisbury the largest dualled section runs for about 4 miles (6 km), bypassing the village of Alderbury. Then, the road is briefly dualled from its roundabout with the A3090 to the M27 motorway (junction 2) – this part of the road is erroneously thought by some to have been previously known as the A36(M); prior to the opening of the Totton Western Bypass on the other side of the junction, it was named as a spur of the M27, and hence is built to motorway standards. The A36 reverts to single carriageway standard through Totton until it terminates.

== Junction list ==
County	Location	mi	km	Destinations	Notes
Somerset	Newton St Loe	0.0	0.0	A4 (Bristol Road / Newbridge Road) to A39 – Bristol, Wells, Corston, Newbridge, Weston	Northern terminus
Somerset	Bath	1.6	2.6	Windsor Bridge Road (A3604 north) / Brook Road to A431 – Bitton, Weston, Newbridge	Weston and Newbridge signed westbound only; southern terminus of A3604
Somerset	Bath	2.6	4.2	A367 (Broad Quay / Wells Road) to A37 – City centre, Radstock, Shepton Mallet	City centre signed eastbound only
Somerset	Bath	2.8– 3.0	4.5– 4.8	Claverton Street (A3062 south) – Claverton Down, Combe Down	Northern terminus of A3062
Somerset	Bath	3.6	5.8	Bathwick Street to A4 / A46 / M4 – Chippenham, Stroud	
Somerset	Norton St Philip	11.4	18.3	A366 east – Trowbridge, Farleigh Hungerford	Northern terminus of A366 concurrency
Somerset	Norton St Philip	11.6	18.7	A366 west (Farleigh Road) to A362 – Norton St Philip, Radstock	Southern terminus of A366 concurrency
Somerset	Beckington	14.5	23.3	A361 north-east / to Bath Road – Trowbridge, Beckington, Southwick, Rudge, Rode	Northern terminus of A361 concurrency
Somerset	Beckington	15.2	24.5	A361 / Warminster Road / Old Warminster Road – Taunton, Frome, Beckington	Southern terminus of A361 concurrency
Wiltshire	Chapmanslade	18.0– 18.2	29.0– 29.3	A3098 – Westbury, Chapmanslade, Dilton Marsh	Grade–separated junction
Wiltshire	Warminster	19.8	31.9	A350 north / B3414 (Bath Road) to A363 – Chippenham, Trowbridge, Warminster, Westbury	Northern terminus of A350 concurrency
Wiltshire	Warminster	21.4	34.4	A362 west / Victoria Road – Frome, Corsley Heath, Warminster	Eastern terminus of A362
Wiltshire	Warminster	22.7	36.5	A350 south / Deverill Road – Poole, Blandford, Shaftesbury, Longbridge Deverill, Crockerton, Warminster	Poole and Shaftesbury signed southbound only; southern terminus of A350 concurrency
Wiltshire	Deptford	32.7– 33.1	52.6– 53.3	A303 – Andover, Winterbourne Stoke, Honiton, Exeter, Wylye, Mere, London, Amesbury	London and Amesbury signed southbound only; junction on A303
Wiltshire	Wilton	41.0	66.0	A30 west (Minster Street) / The Avenue to A360 – Wilton, Devizes, Shaftesbury	A30 and Shaftesbury signed westbound only; western terminus of A30 concurrency
Wiltshire	Wilton–Quidhampton boundary	41.4	66.6	A3094 east (Netherhampton Road) to A338 – Bournemouth, Ringwood	Only route signed westbound; western terminus of A3094
Wiltshire	Salisbury	43.3	69.7	A360 north-west (Devizes Road) / Fisherton Street – Devizes	South-eastern terminus of A360
Wiltshire	Salisbury	43.6– 43.7	70.2– 70.3	Central Salisbury	Grade–separated junction
Wiltshire	Salisbury	43.8	70.5	A345 north (Castle Road) / Castle Street – Amesbury	Western terminus of A345 concurrency
Wiltshire	Salisbury	44.3	71.3	A30 east / A338 north to St Mark's Avenue / Wain-a-Long Road / Estcourt Road / A343 – London, Marlborough, Andover, Laverstock	Eastern terminus of A30 concurrency; western terminus of A338 concurrency
Wiltshire	Salisbury	44.6	71.8	Bourne Hill / Estcourt Road	Grade–separated junction; westbound exit only
Wiltshire	Salisbury	44.6	71.8	Kelsey Road / Rampart Road	Grade–separated junction; eastbound exit only
Wiltshire	Salisbury	44.8– 44.9	72.1– 72.3	Multistorey car park	Grade–separated junction
Wiltshire	Salisbury	45.1	72.6	A338 south / A354 south (Churchill Way South) – Bournemouth, Blandford	Eastern terminus of A338 / A354 concurrency
Wiltshire	Alderbury	48.9– 49.4	78.7– 79.5	West Dean, Farley, Grimstead, Alderbury, Whaddon	
Wiltshire	Whiteparish	51.5	82.9	A27 east (Brickworth Road) – Romsey, Whiteparish	Western terminus of A27
Hampshire	Copythorne–Netley Marsh–Romsey Extra boundary	59.3	95.4	M27 / A3090 north-east to A326 – Southampton, Portsmouth, Ringwood, Fawley, Romsey, Totton, Bournemouth	Bournemouth signed northbound only; south-western terminus of A3090
Hampshire	Netley Marsh	60.2	96.9	A31 south-west (Romsey Road) to A337 – Copythorne, Cadnam, Lyndhurst	North-eastern terminus of A31
Hampshire	Netley Marsh	60.6– 60.8	97.5– 97.8	A326 to M27 / A3090 – Salisbury, Romsey, Fawley, Totton (west & south)	
Hampshire	Totton	63.1	101.5	A336 west (Ringwood Road) – Cadnam, Eling, Netley Marsh, Totton (west)	Netley Marsh and Totton signed northbound only; eastern terminus of A336
Hampshire	Totton	63.7	102.5	A33 east to M271 / M27 – Southampton	Eastern terminus; no access to A33 west or from A33 east
1.000 mi = 1.609 km; 1.000 km = 0.621 mi: Concurrency terminus; Incomplete access

== Points of interest ==
Point	Coordinates (Links to map resources)	OS Grid Ref	Notes
Bath	51.3892°N 2.3971°W	ST724656	Bath, Somerset
Southampton	50.9221°N 1.4703°W	SU373137	Southampton
