= Bloxworth =

Village and civil parish in Dorset, England

Coordinates: 50.7512°N 2.1685°W

- Former post office, Bloxworth

- Location within Dorset
- Population: 200
- OS grid reference: SY882946
- Civil parish: Bloxworth
- Unitary authority: Dorset
- Ceremonial county: Dorset
- Region: South West
- Country: England
- Sovereign state: United Kingdom
- Post town: Wareham
- Postcode district: BH20
- Police: Dorset
- Fire: Dorset and Wiltshire
- Ambulance: South Western
- UK Parliament: Mid Dorset and North Poole

Bloxworth is a village and civil parish in the English county of Dorset, within Wareham Forest on the A35 road 5 miles (8 km) west of Poole. In the 2011 census the civil parish had 80 households and a population of 200. Bloxworth Heath is home to Woolsbarrow Hillfort.

To the northwest of the village is Bloxworth House, the first brick building in Dorset.

The hamlet of East Bloxworth lies about a mile to the east of the village.

== Notable people ==
- Octavius Pickard-Cambridge FRS (1828–1917), clergyman and zoologist.
