= Spur route =

Short road forming a branch from a freeway, Interstate Highway, or motorway

Diagrams showing how a spur connects to a third city, and numbering scheme

A spur route is a short road forming a branch from a longer, more important road such as a freeway, Interstate Highway, or motorway. A bypass or beltway is not considered a spur route as it typically reconnects with another or the same major road.

== Canada ==
In the province of Ontario, most spur routes are designated as A or B, such as Highway 17A, or 7B. A stands for "Alternate Route", and usually links a highway to a town's central core or main attraction, while B stands for "Business Route" or "Bypass", but are used when a main highway is routed around a town and away from its former alignment. The designation of "C" was used twice (Highway 3C and 40C), and is assumed to mean "Connector". Both highways have long since been retired and are now county roads. There was also one road with the D designation (Highway 8D, later the original Highway 102), and this may have stood for "Diversion", as it was along the first completed divided highway in Canada at the time (Cootes Drive in Hamilton).

== India ==
The Indian National Highway system designates spur routes of the main National Highways with letter suffixes. For example, National Highway 1 has four spur routes: NH 1A, NH 1B, NH 1C, and NH 1D, the shortest of which is just 6 kilometres (3.7 mi) in length (NH 1C) and the longest is 663 kilometres (412 mi) (NH 1A). While the spur routes essentially originate at the parent National Highway, they are not merely secondary in status as some of the spur routes serve important cities in India. For example, Srinagar, the capital of the state of Jammu and Kashmir, is served by the spur route NH 1A. Some spur routes are specifically used to connect important Indian ports: NH 5A links Paradip with its parent NH 5 and NH 7A links Tuticorin with NH 7).

== Italy ==
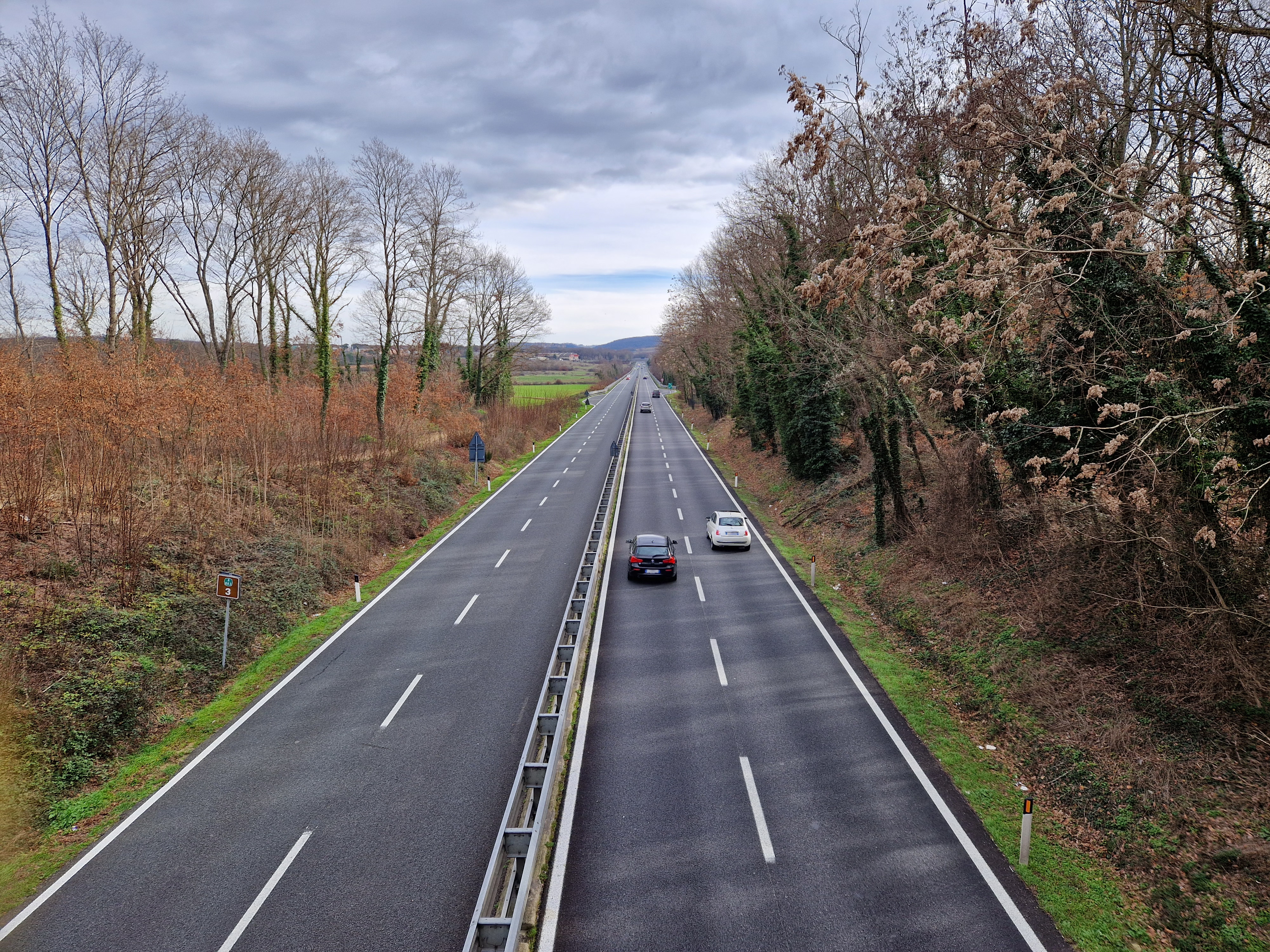
Raccordo autostradale RA3

The acronym RA stands for Raccordo autostradale (translated as "motorway connection"), a relatively short spur route that connects an autostrada (Italian for motorway) to a nearby city or tourist resort not directly served by the motorway. These spurs are owned and managed by Anas. Some spurs are toll-free motorways (type-A), but most are type-B or type-C roads. All RA have separate carriageways with two lanes in each direction. Generally, they do not have an emergency lane.

== Japan ==
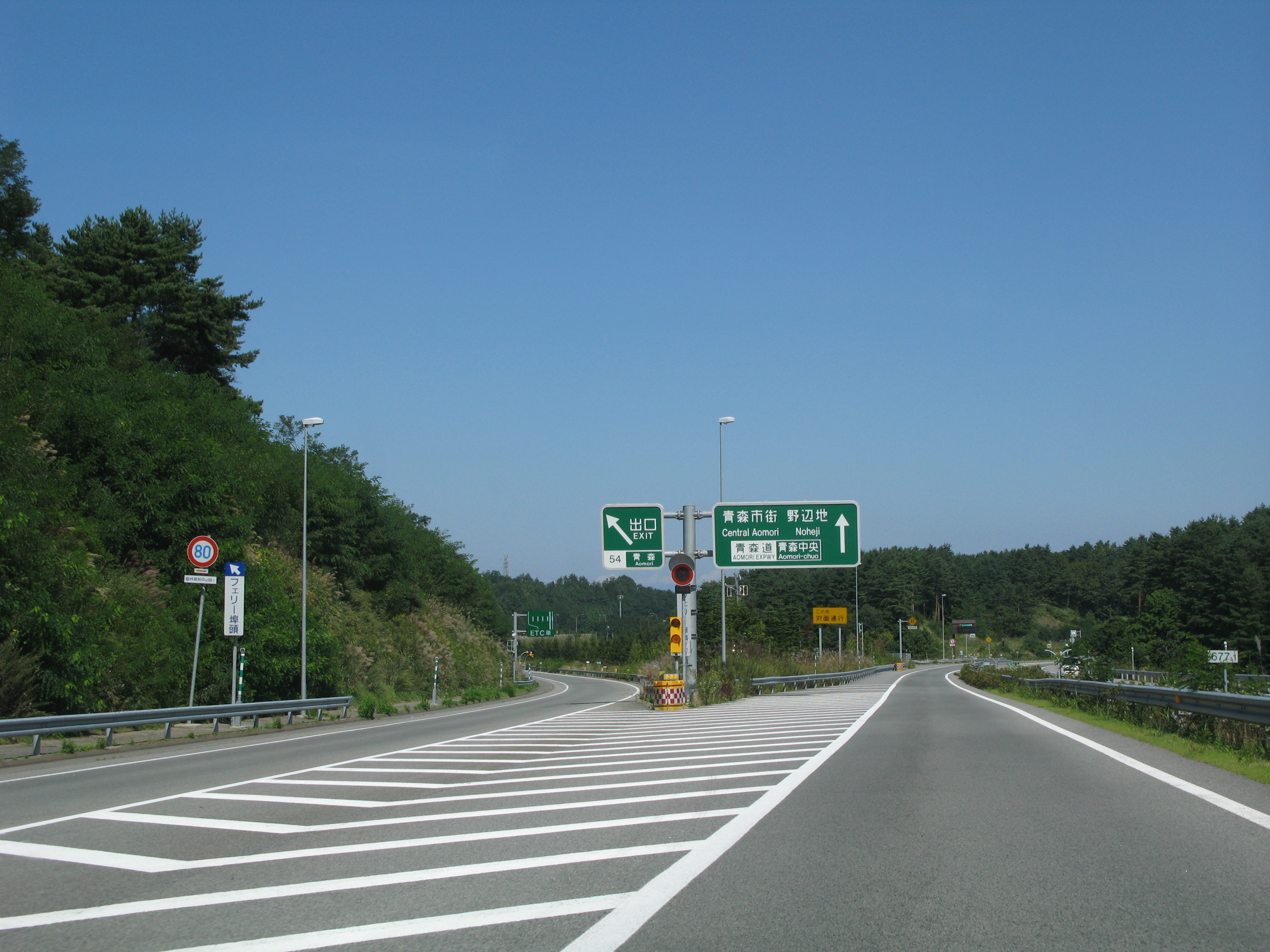
The Aomori Expressway (E4A) spur splits from the Tōhoku Expressway (E4)

In Japan, spurs of its expressways are usually designated with an added letter "A". This designation applies to all routes that are part of a "family" of routes with the "parent" route lacking the added "A". Examples of spur routes in the system include the Aomori Expressway (E4A), linking the Tōhoku Expressway (E4) to the eastern limits of Aomori, and the Sasson Expressway (E5A), linking the Dō-Ō Expressway (E5) to Otaru; however, some expressways that lack the "A" designation could also be considered spurs, such as the Kansai-Kūkō Expressway (E71) or the Ōita Airport Road (E97).

== New Zealand ==
In New Zealand, spurs on state highways are usually designated with an added letter. Examples include SH 2B, linking SH 2 to Napier Airport, and SH 6A, linking SH 6 with Queenstown town center. Not all such alphabetic suffixes refer to spurs, however; ring roads and linking roads between highways are also so designated. Conversely, some State Highways could themselves be considered spurs, notably SH 78, New Zealand's shortest state highway, which links SH 1 in Timaru city center with the Port of Timaru.

Such spurs and spur roads leading from smaller urban thoroughfares to individual facilities are often referred to in New Zealand as "feeder roads".

== Romania ==
All national roads, local roads and county roads have spur routes. A good example is DN1 and DN1A. DN1A goes from Bucharest to Brașov via Buftea, and have an intersection with DN1 at Ploiești. After Ploiești, DN1A goes to Vălenii de Munte, Cheia, and then DN1A goes directly onto the Brașov.

== United Kingdom ==
In the UK, a spur route carries the same definition, but the numbering rules differ.

=== Same-number spurs ===
Short spurs from primary roads or motorways typically are not given a unique number, and three arms of the junction will apparently have the same number. For example, the A14 has a same-number spur to the A1(M) motorway at Huntingdon in Cambridgeshire, the M23 motorway has one to Gatwick Airport in West Sussex and the M4 has one to Heathrow Airport. To distinguish the spur on road signs, the road it leads to is usually given - for example "Gatwick Airport (A23)".

=== Unique-number spurs ===
Typically, slightly longer spurs, or those with intermediate junctions of their own, are given unique numbers to distinguish them from their parent road, for example, the A48(M) motorway, a spur of the M4. There is a loose numbering system for these spurs on the motorway network, not dissimilar to the US system – the road takes a three-digit number derived from that of the parent road. Examples include the M602 motorway (spur of the M60 and M62 motorways), M621 motorway (spur of the M62 and M1 motorways), and M271 motorway (spur of the M27 motorway). There are anomalous spur numbers though, for instance the M898 motorway (spur of the M8 motorway; number given to match with a unique A-number road) and the unique case of the M181 motorway, a spur of a spur M180 motorway, and that of the M18 motorway

A-road spurs do not follow a noticeable numbering system; they would be impossible to assign due to the quantity of A-road numbers in use.

== United States ==
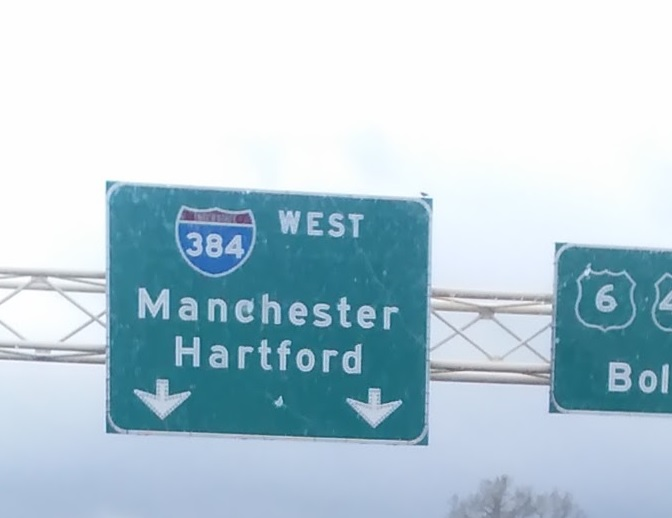
Interstate 384, a spur of Interstate 84 in Connecticut

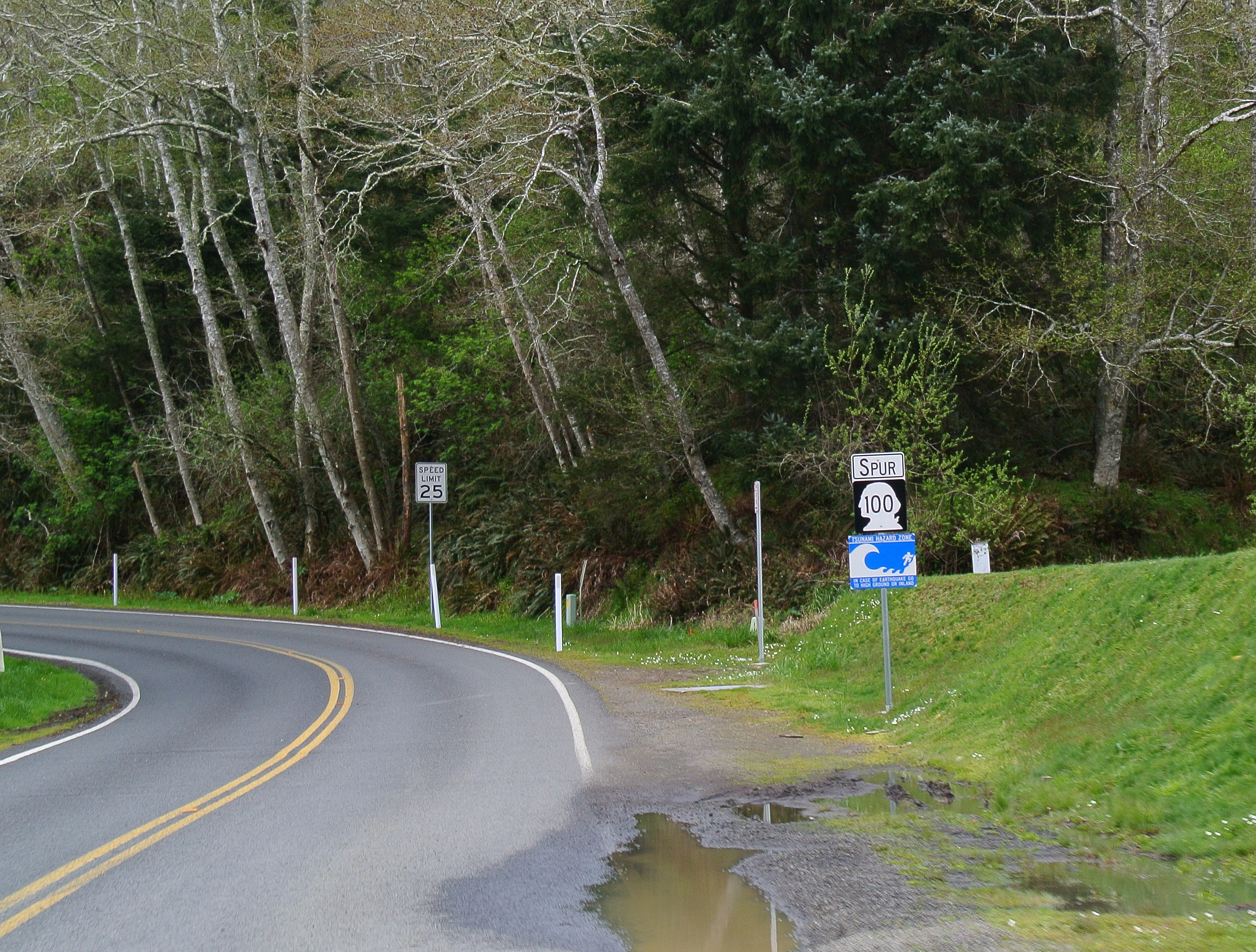
Spur route of Washington State Route 100

In the US, many Interstate Highways have spur routes when they enter a large metropolitan area. Interstate spur routes are numbered with a three-digit number. The last two digits of the number are the number of the "parent" Interstate (Interstate 238, which connects Interstate 880 with Interstate 580 near Hayward, CA, is the only exception to this); e.g. a spur route of Interstate 90 could be 990; a spur route of Interstate 5 could be 105.

Spur Interstate routes have three-digit numbers with an odd first digit. A subsidiary route either passing through a city or bypassing it and then reconnecting to a major highway would receive an even first digit, and be considered a loop rather than a spur. For example, in the case of Interstate 5, Interstate 105 is a spur route ending at Los Angeles International Airport, whereas Interstate 405 begins and ends at Interstate 5, bypassing downtown Los Angeles.

Spurs are also found branching from US highways, state routes, and county routes, often as extended onramps and offramps of expressways.

There are many numbering violations in the spur route numbering system, thus the general rules above do not always apply (e.g. U.S. Route 400—there is no parent "route 0").

== See also ==
- Special route
- Loop route
