= A37 road =

Road in England

A37

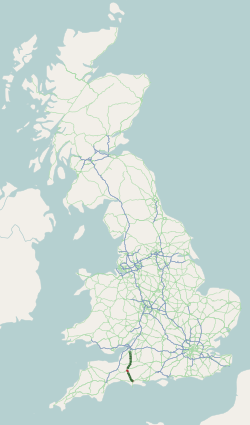

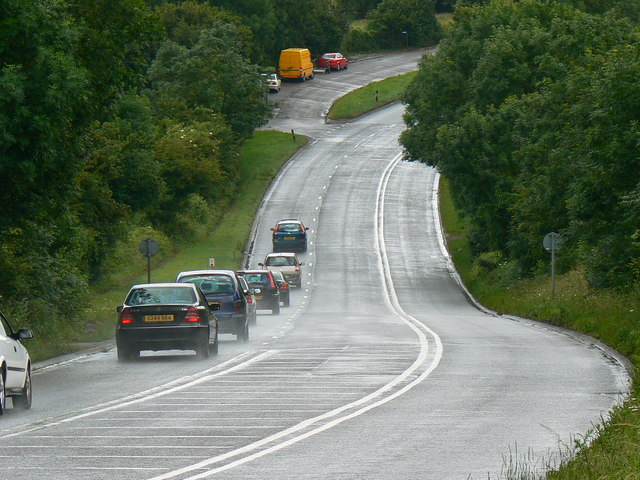
- The A37 north of Pensford

Route information
- Length: 60.4 mi (97.2 km)

Major junctions
- South end: A35 / A352 near Dorchester; 50.712°N 2.473°W

- A30 in Yeovil A303 in Ilchester A372 near Podimore A361 near Shepton Mallet A371 near Shepton Mallet; A39 near Farrington Gurney A368 near Pensford A4174 in Bristol
- North end: A4 in Bristol; 51.444°N 2.578°W

Location
- Country: United Kingdom
- Counties: Dorset, Somerset
- Primary destinations: Bristol; Shepton Mallet; Yeovil; Dorchester

Road network
- Roads in the United Kingdom; Motorways; A and B road zones
← A36	→ A38

The A37 is a major road in south west England.

== Route ==
It runs north from the A35 at Dorchester in Dorset into Somerset through Yeovil and Shepton Mallet before terminating at the Three Lamps junction with the A4 in central Bristol. The road is entirely single carriageway, except in the Yeovil and Bristol built-up areas, at Ilchester (where it multiplexes with the A303), and north of Dorchester.

From the Podimore roundabout northeast of Ilchester to Shepton Mallet the route traces that of the Fosse Way.

== History ==
The original A37 in 1922 started in Fortuneswell on the Isle of Portland, however, the section to Dorchester was soon renumbered A354, presumably to create a link between the port of Weymouth and the A30 at Salisbury, from where the route would continue to London. Such a route has now been superseded by the M27 and M3.

One of the worst accident spots on the A37 was the A371 junction just south of Shepton Mallet. The junction was always very busy and suffered long traffic queues due to the nature of the road. The junction was also a point where traffic would converge or pass through from multiple locations, this was further exacerbated by the A361 Glastonbury junction which backed right onto the first junction. This muddled configuration resulted in numerous road traffic accidents, many of which were fatal.

After a long campaign for the junction to be replaced, a roundabout was constructed in 1999 significantly improving road safety and traffic flow. There have been few other construction schemes on the road in recent decades.

In recent years most of the overtaking lanes, provided on steep stretches just south of Bristol, have been blocked out with chevrons.

== Future ==
A potential extension of the A4174 Avon Ring Road from the Hicks Gate Roundabout near Keynsham to the A37 south of Whitchurch would provide a direct link to the M32 and M4 north of Bristol.

== Junction list ==
County	Location	mi	km	Destinations	Notes
Dorset	Winterbourne Market–Bradford Peverell–Dorchester boundary	0.0	0.0	A35 / A352 south / B3150 / Bridport Road to A354 / A31 – Honiton, Poole, Weymouth, Blandford, Ringwood, Dorchester, Winterbourne Abbas, Bridport, Winterbourne Monkton, Puddletown, Wareham, Martinstown	Southern terminus; southern terminus of A352 concurrency
Dorset	Charminster	1.6	2.6	A352 north (North Street) – Charminster, Cerne Abbas, Sherborne	Northern terminus of A352 concurrency
Dorset	Frampton	4.6	7.4	A356 north-west (Dorchester Road) – Crewkerne, Frampton, Maiden Newton	South-eastern terminus of A356
Somerset	Yeovil	18.9	30.4	A30 west to M5 / A303 – Chard, Crewkerne, Exeter, Taunton	Only A30, Chard, and Crewkerne signed southbound; southern terminus of A30 concurrency
Somerset	Yeovil	19.3	31.1	Lysander Road (A3088 west) / Brunswick Street to M5 / A303 – Taunton, Exeter, Chard, Crewkerne, Montacute, Stoke-sub-Hamdon	Montacute and Stoke-sub-Hamdon signed westbound only; eastern terminus of A3088
Somerset	Yeovil	19.9	32.0	A30 east (Reckleford) / Park Road – Town centre, Sherborne	Eastern terminus of A30 concurrency
Somerset	Yeovil	20.1	32.3	A359 north (Mudford Road) / Preston Road – Frome, Odcombe, Montacute, Queen Camel, Marston Magna, Mudford	Southern terminus of A359
Somerset	Ilchester	24.7– 25.4	39.8– 40.9	A303 south-west to M5 / A358 – Exeter, Taunton	To M5 signed northbound only, To A358 southbound only
Somerset	Yeovilton	27.4	44.1	A303 north-east / A372 north-west / Podimore Road to B3151 – London, Andover, Langport, Wincanton, Sparkford, Podimore, Street, Somerton, Yeovilton	Yeovilton signed southbound only; northern terminus of A303 concurrency; south-eastern terminus of A372
Somerset	Pilton–Doulting–Shepton Mallet boundary	39.4	63.4	A361 south (East Compton Road) – Glastonbury, Taunton, Pilton	Southern terminus of A361 concurrency
Somerset	Shepton Mallet	39.5	63.6	A371 south-east to A303 / B3081 – Castle Cary, Evercreech	Southern terminus of A371 concurrency
Somerset	Shepton Mallet	40.0– 40.7	64.4– 65.5	A361 north / A371 north-west – Frome, Shepton Mallet, Wells	Northern terminus of A361 / A371 concurrency
Somerset	Ashwick	42.9	69.0	A367 north (Bath Road) – Radstock, Oakhill, Stratton-on-the-Fosse, Bath	Only Bath signed southbound only; southern terminus of A367
Somerset	Ston Easton	48.6	78.2	A39 south-west – Wells	Southern terminus of A39 concurrency
Somerset	Farrington Gurney	49.1	79.0	A362 east – Midsomer Norton, Radstock, Frome	Western terminus of A362
Somerset	High Littleton	50.0	80.5	A39 north-east (Wells Road) to B3355 – Bath, High Littleton, Hallatrow, Paulton	Northern terminus of A39 concurrency
Somerset	Chelwood	53.5	86.1	A368 – Bath, Weston-super-Mare, Chelwood, Marksbury, Keynsham, Bishop Sutton, Chew Valley Lake	
Somerset	Bristol	59.0	95.0	A4174 (Airport Road / Wootton Park) to M5 / M32 / M4 / A38 / A4 – Bath, Taunton, Avonmouth, Bristol Airport, Brislington, St Philip's Marsh, Hartcliffe, Bishopsworth	Only Bath, Taunton, and Avonmouth signed southbound
Somerset	Bristol	60.4	97.2	A4 west – City centre, Knowle, Totterdown	Northern terminus; no access to A4 east or from A4 west
1.000 mi = 1.609 km; 1.000 km = 0.621 mi: Concurrency terminus; Incomplete access
