= E97 =

E97 may refer to:

- European route E97
- King's Indian Defense, Encyclopedia of Chess Openings code
- Hiji Bypass and Ōita Airport Road, route E97 in Japan
