= Lytchett =

Lytchett may refer to the following places in England:

- Lytchett Bay, part of Poole Harbour, Dorset
- Lytchett Heath
- Lytchett Matravers
- Lytchett Minster, a village in Dorset
- Lytchett Minster and Upton, a civil parish in Dorset
