= Decoy Heath =

Heathland in Dorset, England

Coordinates: 50°43′11″N 2°07′21″W

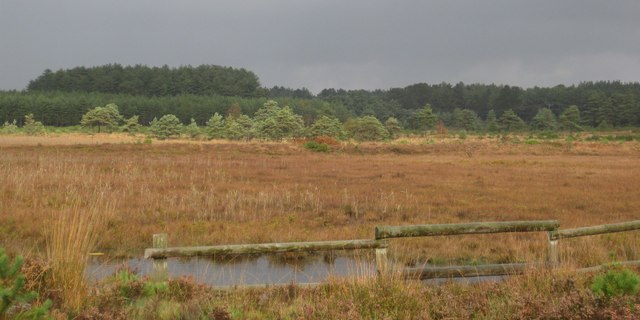
View over Decoy Heath

Decoy Heath is an area of open heathland and bog forming part of Wareham Forest west of the Poole-Bournemouth conurbation in south Dorset, England. It is part of the Dorset Heaths.

Decoy Heath is the lower part of Morden Bog, which is a National Nature Reserve, and lies in the centre of Wareham Forest about 2.5 kilometres north-northwest of the village of Sandford to the west of the B 3075. To the east, across the B road is Gore Heath; to the north, beyond the Sherford River, the land rises up to the open hillsides of Chitten Hill (41m) and to the south to wooded slopes of Great Ovens Hill (37m). To the west are Morden Heath, Northport Heath and Trigon Hill. The Hardy Way runs along the western edge of the heath and there is a memorial by the wayside.

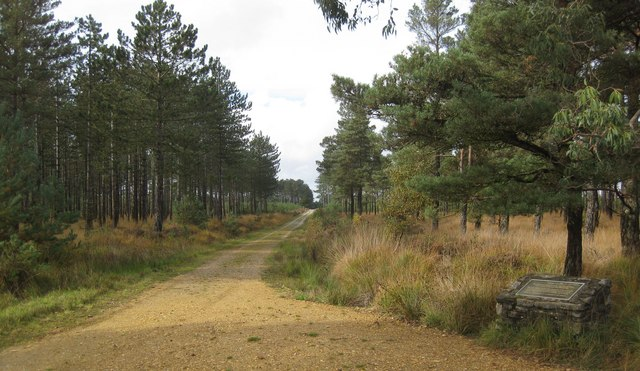
Parsons Pleaser Memorial on Decoy Heath

The Decoy Pond and its associated overnight shelter are a scheduled monument. It is one of only two surviving decoy ponds in Dorset.
