= Upton, Dorset =

Town in Dorset, England

Coordinates: 50.7384°N 2.0289°W

Upton
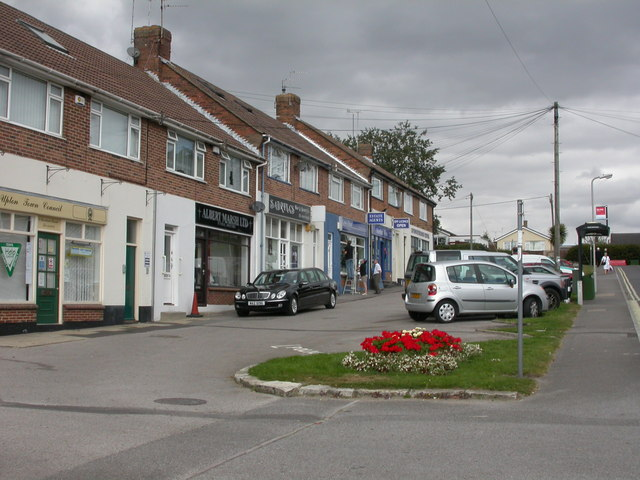
- Shops at Upton

- Location within Dorset
- OS grid reference: SY978932
- Civil parish: Lytchett Minster and Upton
- Unitary authority: Dorset
- Ceremonial county: Dorset
- Region: South West
- Country: England
- Sovereign state: United Kingdom
- Post town: POOLE
- Postcode district: BH16
- Dialling code: 01202
- Police: Dorset
- Fire: Dorset and Wiltshire
- Ambulance: South Western
- UK Parliament: Mid Dorset and North Poole

Upton is a town in south-east Dorset, England. Upton is to the east of Holton Heath and Upton Heath, and to the north of the Poole suburb of Hamworthy. It is the second largest town in the Purbeck Hills.

== Geography ==
The town is built around a road junction where the Blandford to Hamworthy road crosses the main Poole to Dorchester road. The Poole suburbs of Hamworthy and Turlin Moor adjoin to the south, and Lytchett Minster village lies a short distance to the west.

The town is bounded by several areas of open space. To the north, Upton Heath is a Site of Special Scientific Interest (SSSI), while, eastwards, Upton Wood and the former estate Upton Country Park separate the town from Holes Bay. To the south, Lytchett Bay is part of Poole Harbour SSSI.

Although mostly residential, Upton features a small industrial estate .

In 2000, The Upton Clock Tower was built at the Upton Crossroads to celebrate the new millennium and represent the town pride. A dementia care home was opened at the Crossroads in 2015 on the prominent former site of The Greenridge pub opposite Upton Library and Upton Health Centre. It features a pharmacy and a coffee shop.

There are more shops in Moorland Parade, at the top of Moorland Way, where the Lytchett Minster & Upton Town Council offices are located.

Upton has two churches. Upton Methodist Church's Wesleyan Chapel was built in 1865, while planning permission for the present St Dunstan's church and the adjoining Community Centre was granted in 1991, replacing an older church on the same site.

== Governance ==
Upton forms part of the civil parish of Lytchett Minster and Upton, which in turn forms part of the Dorset unitary authority area. It is within the Mid Dorset and North Poole constituency of the House of Commons.

=== European Parliament ===
Between 1979 and 2020, Upton was represented in the European Parliament.

From 1979 to 1984, Upton was part of the single member district of Wessex, and represented by Conservative Member of the European Parliament James Spicer.

From 1984 to 1994, Upton was part of the Dorset East and Hampshire West constituency and from 1994 to 1999, Upton was part of the Dorset and East Devon constituency represented by Conservative Bryan Cassidy.

Upton was included in the South West England constituency for elections to the European Parliament from 1999 to 2020.

== Education ==
Upton has two state schools, Upton Infant School and Upton Junior School, which are feeder schools for Lytchett Minster School. The Yarrells Preparatory School and Ladybirds Playschool (previously L.U.C.A. Ladybirds) are also based in the town. Upton Methodists Pre-School is based at the Methodist church

== Transport ==
Upton lies at the intersection of the A35 and the A350. The town is served by Wilts & Dorset bus routes numbers 8, 9, 10 and 40 and FirstGroup's X54 service. Together, these provide links to Hamworthy, Creekmoor, Poole, Wareham, Lytchett Matravers, Swanage and Weymouth.

Hamworthy is the nearest railway station, with twice-hourly trains in each direction on the South West Main Line between London Waterloo and Weymouth. Poole station, while more distant, provides more frequent services.
