= Bloxworth Heath =

Heathland near Wareham, Dorset, England

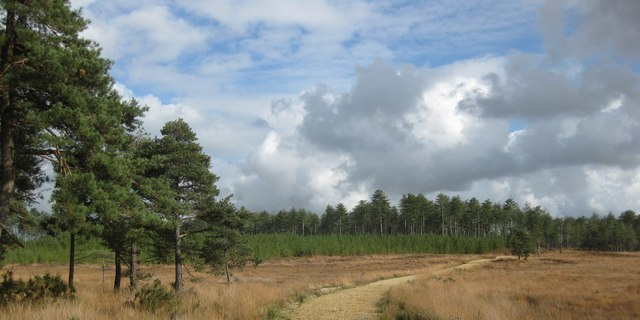
Bloxworth Heath looking east

Bloxworth Heath is a four-square-mile area of heathland north of the town of Wareham in the county of Dorset, England. It is part of Wareham Forest.

== Location ==
Bloxworth Heath lies about 6 kilometres southeast of the town of Bere Regis in Dorset and around 7 kilometres northwest of Wareham. It forms a low forested plateau between the rivers Sherford to the northeast and Piddle to the southwest. It is situated on either side of the minor road from Bere Regis to Wareham and south of the A35. To the west are Bere Heath and Philliols Heath, to the southwest is the Piddle valley, to the south is the Lower Hyde Heath, to the east is Morden Heath, to the northeast is Black Heath and to the north, on the far side of the A35, is Bere Wood and the village of Bloxworth.

== Hillfort ==
In the middle of Bloxworth Heath on a small knoll is the hillfort of Woolsbarrow. This is the highest point of the heath (67 m) and offers good views over the area. There is a trig point at the top.

== Flora and fauna ==
Bloxworth Heath is home to two very rare species of fauna: the ground crab spider, Xysticus luctator, and the short-tailed blue butterfly (Cupido argiades), which was originally called the Bloxworth blue as this is where it was first recorded in 1885.

== Walking ==
Bloxworth Heath is a popular walking area and there are car parks at Sugar Hill in the centre of the area and at Stroud Bridge in the south, both on the minor road from Bere Regis to Wareham. There are numerous trails including the Hardy Way and Wareham Forest Way.
