= Gore Heath =

Coordinates: 50.723°N 2.108°W

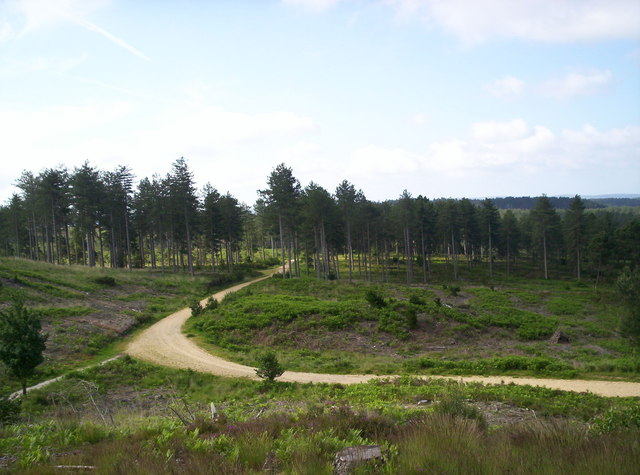
Gore Heath

Gore Heath is an area of coniferous woodland and open heathland forming part of Wareham Forest west of the Poole-Bournemouth conurbation in south Dorset, England. It is part of the Dorset Heaths and an SSSI.

Gore Heath lies about 1 kilometre west of the hamlet of Organford and 2 kilometres north of Sandford. To the west, on the far side of the B3075, are Decoy Heath and Morden Heath. Its northern boundary is the River Sherford, beyond which is farmland and the hamlet of Slepe on the A 35.

Gore Heath is a popular walking, horse riding and cycling destination as well as a habitat for rare sand lizards and ground-nesting birds.

It has recently been the centre of a controversial plan to turn most of the area over for the extraction of gravel with fears that it will subsequently become a landfill site.
