= Lytchett Minster =

Village in Dorset, England

Coordinates: 50.7359°N 2.0569°W

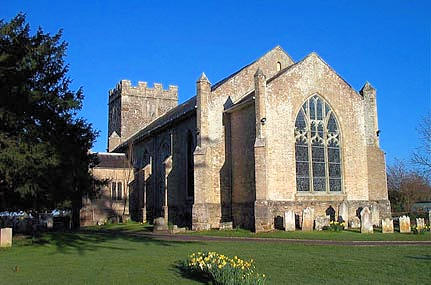
- Lytchett Minster Parish Church

- Location within Dorset
- OS grid reference: SY960931
- Civil parish: Lytchett Minster and Upton
- Unitary authority: Dorset
- Ceremonial county: Dorset
- Region: South West
- Country: England
- Sovereign state: United Kingdom
- Post town: POOLE
- Postcode district: BH16
- Dialling code: 01202
- Police: Dorset
- Fire: Dorset and Wiltshire
- Ambulance: South Western
- UK Parliament: Mid Dorset and North Poole

Lytchett Minster is a village in Dorset, England. It lies around 4 miles (6.4 km) north-west of Poole town centre. The village forms part of the civil parish of Lytchett Minster and Upton, Upton now being a suburb of Poole.

== Etymology ==
The name of Lytchett Minster is first attested in the Domesday Book of 1086 as Lichet. This name comes from the Brittonic words that survive in modern Welsh as llwyd ("grey") and coed ("wood"). The name is first attested with addition of Minster in 1244, in forms such as Licheminster. This was used to distinguish the settlement from Lytchett Matravers and arose because the estate was a chapelry of the minster Sturminster Marshall.

== Geography ==
=== Location ===
Lytchett Minster lies on low-lying farmland around 2 kilometres (1.2 miles) west of the Poole district of Upton, 2.5 kilometres (1.6 miles) southeast of the village of Lytchett Matravers, and 1.2 miles east-northeast of Organford. To the northeast are Lytchett Heath, Beacon Hill and Upton Heath; to the southwest are Gore Heath and Holton Heath. The A35 dual carriageway bypasses the village to the east and south.

== History and culture ==
Lytchett Minster is home to a number of manor houses, one of which now hosts the local secondary school.

=== South Lytchett Manor ===
In 1890 Baronet and MP Sir Elliott Lees bought land in Dorset and moved into South Lytchett Manor. The Manor was requisitioned in WW2, serving as the battery headquarters of an anti-aircraft defence regiment. After Sir John Lees' death in 1955, his heir, Sir Thomas Lees, decided to sell rather than renovate, and the Lees family moved to Post Green House, then a farmhouse on the estate. It was bought by the local Council and became Lytchett Minster Secondary Modern School, now Lytchett Minster School.

=== Post Green ===
In July 1942 Lieutenant Colonel Sir Francis Younghusband, explorer and spiritual writer, suffered a stroke. He then retired to Post Green House, as a guest of Lady Madeline Lees, where he died shortly after. He was buried in the village churchyard.

Lady Madeline Lees (née Pelly) was a passionate Christian with a desire to communicate the story of Jesus. After the local school Nativity play for many years, she decided it was time to produce something that could be shown around the world. So she roped in the whole village as actors, retired actor Gerald Rawlinson as a narrator, plus extras from Poole, Upton and other villages to create two successful amateur religious films, "A Voice Crying in the Wilderness" (1958) and "Messiah", released in 1960.

In the mid-1960s, Sir Thomas Lees and his wife, Lady Faith, started offering hospitality to people in need, accommodating up to 25 people at a time in their home and later expanding this community support using local homes they owned, to form the Post Green Community. The Post Green Community organized camps, retreats and seminars that attracted Christians from all over UK and abroad. It was associated with David Watson, Graham Pulkingham and the Charismatic movement, while remaining under the umbrella of the Church of England.

Sir Tom, realising how precious the land at Holton was, turned down a multi-million pound offer from a developer and designated it for charitable use as the East Holton Charity, renamed Holton Lee in 1992, had charitable trust status to develop an environmental and arts centre for disabled people. Since 2015 the charity has been taken over by UK charity Livability.

== Governance ==
Lytchett Minster is within the Mid Dorset and North Poole constituency of the House of Commons. Until 31 January 2020, it was within the South West England constituency of the European Parliament. Two electoral wards exist: Lychett Minster and Upton East, and Lychett Minster and Upton West. As well as including most of Upton, the wards extend to the Beacon Hill area to the north and Bulbury to the west. The total population of the two wards at the 2011 Census was 7,983.
