= Rownhams services =

Motorway service area in Hampshire, England

Rownhams Services
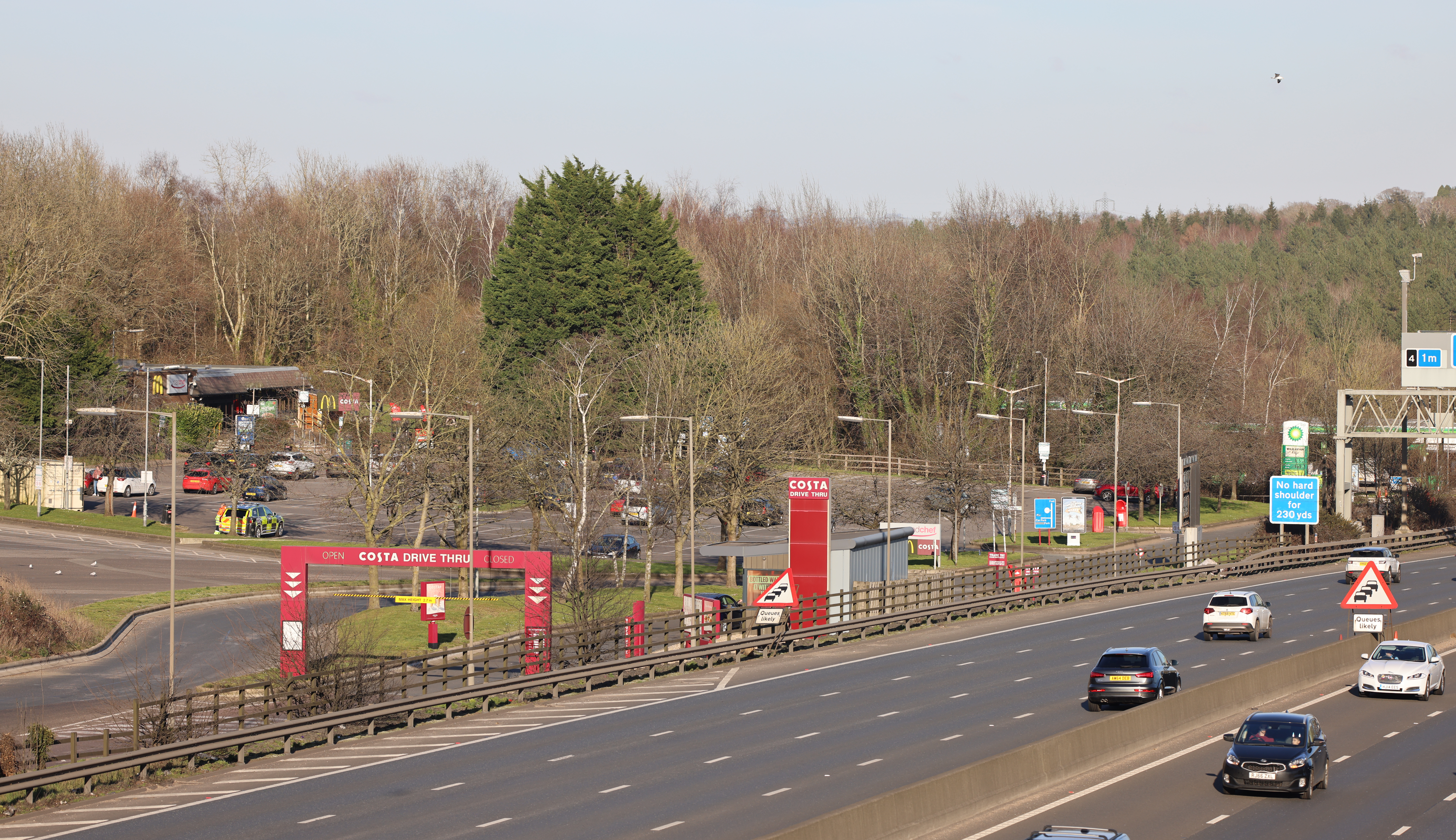
- The eastbound services

- Location within Hampshire

Information
- County: Hampshire
- Road: M27
- Coordinates: 50.9583°N 1.4489°W
- Operator: Roadchef
- Date opened: 1977
- Website: www.roadchef.com/locations/rownhams-south

Rownhams services is a motorway service station on the M27 motorway, close to the junction for the M271 motorway which leads into Southampton. It is owned by Roadchef.

== History ==
The nearby village did not realise how close the M27 motorway would go to the local housing, and desperately tried to move the motorway north. The village was hugely disappointed when the motorway was not moved away from the village.

== Structure ==
In 2012, the westbound side was refurbished, and a McDonald's restaurant was added. Eastbound traffic can access this by walking through a subway under the motorway.
