= Ōita Airport Road =

Road in Japan

Ōita Airport Road
- 国道大分空港号
- 大分空港道路

Route information
- Maintained by Ōita Prefecture Road Corporation
- Length: 22.9 km (14.2 mi)
- Existed: 1991–present
- Component highways: National Route 213

Major junctions
- From: Hiji Interchange; National Route 213 / Hiji Bypass in Hiji
- To: Shioya Crossing; National Route 213 in Kunisaki

Location
- Country: Japan

Highway system
- National highways of Japan; Expressways of Japan

Ōita Airport Road (大分空港道路, Ōita Kūkōdōro) is a formerly tolled road in Ōita Prefecture. It is owned and operated by the Ōita Prefecture Road Corporation. The route is signed E97 under Ministry of Land, Infrastructure, Transport and Tourism's "2016 Proposal for Realization of Expressway Numbering."

== Route description ==
The Ōita Airport Road begins at a signaled intersection with Japan National Route 213 just to the east of central Hiji. From there it briefly travels north to meet its spur route, a route that links it to the Hiji Bypass. When the routes merge, they turn to the northeast, traveling out of Hiji and in to Kitsuki. The road curves more to the east in Kitsuki and then enters the southern part of Kunisaki. It ends in Kunisaki upon meeting Route 213 once again.

== History ==
The Ōita Airport Road opened on 25 November 1991. A spur route of the toll road, connecting it to the Hiji Bypass, was opened on 30 March 2002. Tolls were removed from the road on 1 December 2010. Many sections of the road have been widened from two lanes to four since its opening.

== Junction list ==
The entire expressway is in Ōita Prefecture.

Location	km	mi	Exit	Name	Destinations	Notes
Hiji	0.0	0.0	–	Hiji Crossing	National Route 213	Western terminus; at-grade intersection
Hiji	2.5	1.6	2	Fujiwara	Ōita Airport Road (spur route) west	Eastbound entrance, westbound exit
Kitsuki	2.8	1.7	PA	Aiwara		Eastbound access only
Kitsuki	10.6	6.6	3	Kitsuki	Ōita Prefecture Route 49	Toll booth closed on 1 December 2010
Kunisaki	18.7	11.6	4	Aki	Ōita Prefecture Route 404	
Kunisaki	20.4	12.7	–	Shioya Crossing	National Route 213	Eastern terminus; at-grade intersection
Through to National Route 213 / Ōita Airport Road
1.000 mi = 1.609 km; 1.000 km = 0.621 mi: Incomplete access; Route transition

=== Spur to Hiji Bypass ===
Location	km	mi	Exit	Name	Destinations	Notes
Through to Hiji Bypass
Hiji	0	0.0	1	Hiji	Hiji Bypass; National Route 10	Western terminus
Hiji	2.5	1.6	2	Fujiwara	Ōita Airport Road (main route)	Eastern terminus
Through to Ōita Airport Road (main route)
1.000 mi = 1.609 km; 1.000 km = 0.621 mi: Route transition
