= Holton Heath railway station =

Railway station in Dorset, England

Coordinates: 50.711°N 2.078°W

Holton Heath
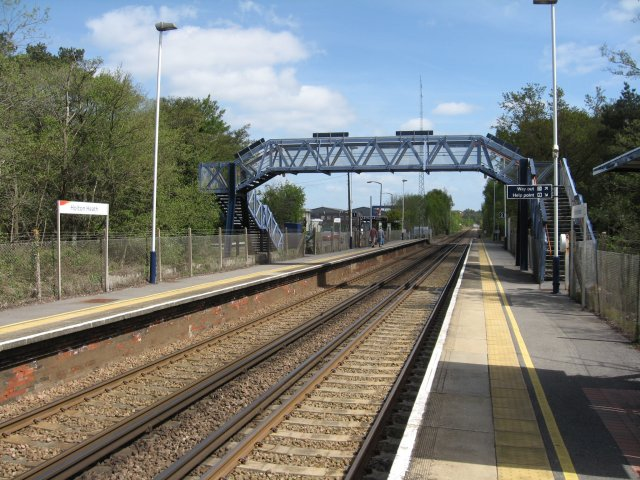

General information
- Location: Wareham St Martin, Dorset Council; England
- Grid reference: SY945901
- Manager: South Western Railway
- Platforms: 2

Other information
- Station code: HOL
- Classification: DfT category F2

History
- Pre-grouping: London and South Western Railway
- Post-grouping: Southern Railway

Key dates
- 3 April 1916: opened for Admiralty staff use
- 14 July 1924: opened to public

Passengers
- 2021/22: ▲23,432
- 2022/23: ▲27,498
- 2023/24: ▲31,700
- 2024/25: ▲42,058
- 2025/26: ▼39,936
Location
Notes
- Passenger statistics from the Office of Rail and Road

Holton Heath railway station serves the area of Holton Heath in Wareham St Martin, Dorset, England. It is 118 miles 61 chains (191.1 km) down the line from London Waterloo. It was built to serve the Royal Navy Cordite Factory, Holton Heath during the First World War. It did not open to the public until 1924.

== History ==
Holton Heath has been unstaffed since 1964, and the signal box removed on 3 November 1969.

On 20 April 1989 a fatal accident occurred just beyond the siding on the London side of the station. A light locomotive, which had just completed shunting duties at the Winfrith nuclear facility, collided with the rear of a freight train. The driver of the light locomotive, Clive Brooker, died in the accident.

== Description ==
The platforms are able to accommodate trains of up to five coaches. The station is one of the few remaining on the line not to be equipped with a self-service ticket machine, only a Permit to Travel machine, located on platform 1.

== Services ==
The station is served hourly by London to Weymouth semi-fast trains during the day. This replaced the now-defunct hourly Wareham to Brockenhurst service in 2008. There are no services in the evening (after 20.00) or on Sundays.

Until 1967, trains through the station were normally steam hauled. Between 1967 and 1988, passenger services were normally provided by Class 33/1 diesel locomotives with Class 438 coaching stock (also known as 4-TC units). The line was electrified in 1988, using the standard British Rail Southern Region direct current third rail at 750 volts. Class 442 electric multiple units were initially used following electrification, until being displaced by new Class 444 electric multiple units in 2007.

Preceding station	National Rail	Following station
Hamworthy	South Western Railway; London Waterloo - Weymouth	Wareham
