= A338 road =

Road in southern England

A338

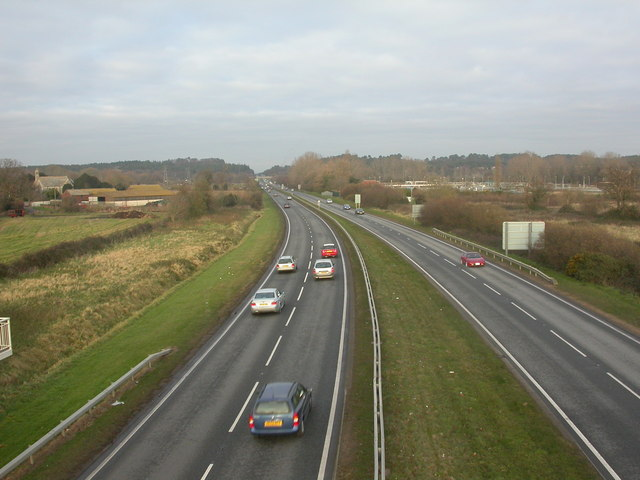

Route information
- Length: 84 mi (135 km)

Major junctions
- South end: Poole, Dorset A35; 50.7240°N 1.9070°W
- A347 A3049 A3060; A31 A354 A3094; A36; A30 A303 A3026 A342 A346; A4 J14 → M4 motorway A417 A415

- North end: Besselsleigh, Oxfordshire A420; 51.7029°N 1.3487°W

Location
- Country: United Kingdom
- Primary destinations: Bournemouth; Ringwood; Salisbury; Tidworth; Wantage

Road network
- Roads in the United Kingdom; Motorways; A and B road zones
| ← A337 | → A339 |

The A338 is a major primary route in southern England, that runs from the junction with the A35 at Poole in Dorset to the junction with the A420 at Besselsleigh in Oxfordshire, a distance of 84 miles (135 km).

In Bournemouth and Poole, the road is known as the Wessex Way.

== Route ==
The road begins at County Gates in Westbourne, before heading northward as a grade separated dual carriageway, one of the main roads in the South East Dorset conurbation. From near Bournemouth International Airport it follows the western side of the Avon valley, joining the route of the A31 road heading north-east for 1 1/2 miles (2.4 km) to cross the valley, before turning left at Ringwood in Hampshire where it joins the original, single carriageway route to the east of the river.

Heading northward up the east side of the Avon, it crosses to the west again near the town of Fordingbridge. After crossing into Wiltshire near Downton, it meets the A354 road at a roundabout near Britford on the southern outskirts of Salisbury, before joining the route of the A36 road as it bypasses the city centre to dual carriageway standard. It then joins the A30 road at St. Mark's Roundabout, before separating in a north-easterly direction to follow the entire length of the River Bourne. It has a grade-separated junction with the main A303 road and then passes through the town of Tidworth. From there the road travels north to Collingbourne Ducis, where it twists through the village around the church to a mini-roundabout. It turns left to continue northwards alongside the Bourne through another narrow stretch at Collingbourne Kingston to another mini-roundabout before again heading north.

Near Burbage the continued route north to Swindon is designated A346, the A338 turning off to the right at a roundabout and heading east then north-east and crossing the border into Berkshire. It passes through the town of Hungerford, where it meets the A4 road (to Marlborough and Newbury). It meets the M4 motorway at junction 14, passes through the village of Great Shefford and crosses into Oxfordshire. It goes through Wantage where it meets the A417 road, and past the villages of Grove, East Hanney and Frilford. It terminates at its junction with the A420 road near Bessels Leigh, 6 miles (9.7 km) south-west of Oxford.

== History ==
The section of the A338 south of the A31 to the west of the Avon consists mostly of a relatively newly built road. Part is constructed along the trackbed of the former Ringwood, Christchurch and Bournemouth Railway which closed in 1935. Originally, the A338 went from Ringwood to Christchurch on the east side of the valley, along what is now the B3347.

=== Central Bournemouth speed limit ===
The Bournemouth Town Centre section of the A338 Wessex Way is carried on viaducts across the Bourne Valley. On 21 January 2010 Bournemouth Borough Council imposed a 40 mph speed limit on this section of A338 dual carriageway (between Bournemouth West Roundabout and St Paul's Roundabout) in an attempt to reduce the accident rate of 198 accidents in four years. The experimental speed limit was run for six months and provoked fierce opposition from the town's residents, with a protest group on Facebook gaining thousands of members who argued that other options such as improving the slip-road lengths should have been trialled before lowering the speed limit.

=== Repair work and funding ===
In 1975 an underpass for the Wessex Way was built underneath Richmond Hill Roundabout in Richmond Hill, Bournemouth.

In February 2011 it was announced that £20m of funding for repair works on the 6.5 miles (10.5 km) stretch south of the junction with the A31 was turned down by the government. Dorset County Council had planned to start work in September 2010, but had to await funding following a Spending Review. As a result of the funding request being unsuccessful, ad hoc work will now be carried out over a number of years instead of a period of about 6 months as originally planned. Dorset and Bournemouth councils are expected to meet the cost of the ad hoc work at around £1m per year.

== Ringwood to Salisbury upgrade campaign ==
The section of A338 between the A31 dual carriageway at Ringwood and Salisbury's A36 Churchill Way is built on a substandard single carriageway alignment with multiple sharp bends as the road follows the line of the River Avon. This section of the road has a poor safety record; it is heavily trafficked and the resulting risky overtaking is responsible for a number of head-on collisions.

Following four fatal head-on collision accidents in 2008 alone, local residents have renewed their calls for the road to be upgraded to dual carriageway to provide a safe overtaking facility and deal with the capacity problems.

== Culture ==
The A338 figures in Thomas Hardy's 'Jude the Obscure', chapter 3. The point where the road crests the downs before beginning the steep drop into Wantage ('Alfredston') is the spot where young Jude stands one evening and looks out for the first time on Oxford ('Christminster').
