= Organford =

Hamlet in Dorset, England

Coordinates: 50.7296°N 2.0863°W

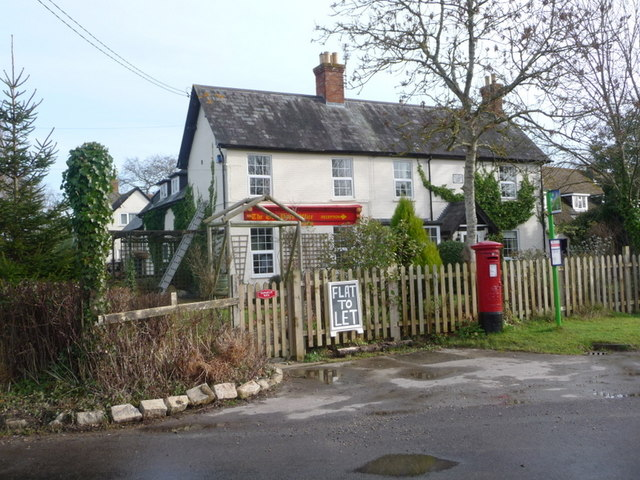
- The Old Post Office at Organford

- Location within Dorset
- OS grid reference: SY940922
- Unitary authority: Dorset
- Ceremonial county: Dorset
- Region: South West
- Country: England
- Sovereign state: United Kingdom
- Police: Dorset
- Fire: Dorset and Wiltshire
- Ambulance: South Western
- UK Parliament: Mid Dorset and North Poole

Organford is a hamlet in the county of Dorset, England. It is located just south of the A35 between Lytchett Minster and Slepe.
