= Upton, south Test Valley =

Coordinates: 50.950°N 1.469°W

Upton
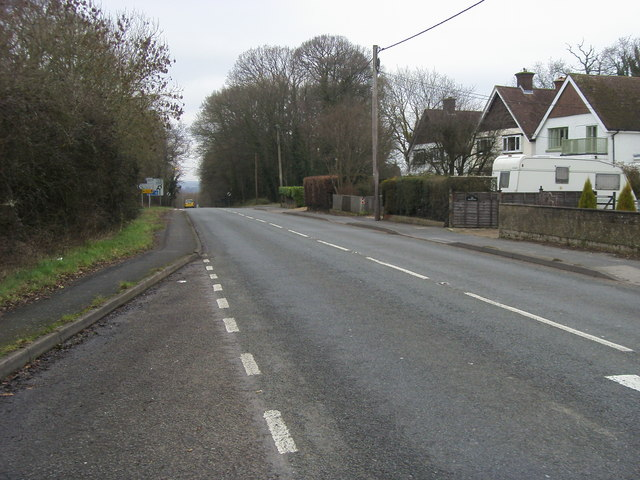

- Location within Hampshire
- OS grid reference: SU372169
- Civil parish: Nursling and Rownhams
- District: Test Valley
- Shire county: Hampshire
- Region: South East
- Country: England
- Sovereign state: United Kingdom
- Post town: Southampton
- Postcode district: SO16
- Dialling code: 023
- Police: Hampshire and Isle of Wight
- Fire: Hampshire and Isle of Wight
- Ambulance: South Central
- UK Parliament: Romsey and Southampton North

Upton is a hamlet in the civil parish of Nursling and Rownhams, in the Test Valley district, in Hampshire, England, located approximately 1 mile north of Nursling.

It lies beside the main Romsey Road (A3057) leading north from Shirley as it rises over Horns Hill. In the 19th century, the hamlet consisted of one or two cottages and a smithy, as well as country house known as Upton House. The housing development of Upton Crescent was built in the 1930s on the site of the former Upton House. The hamlet is near the starting point of the M271 motorway.
