= Japan National Route 212 =

Road in Japan

National Route 212
- 国道212号
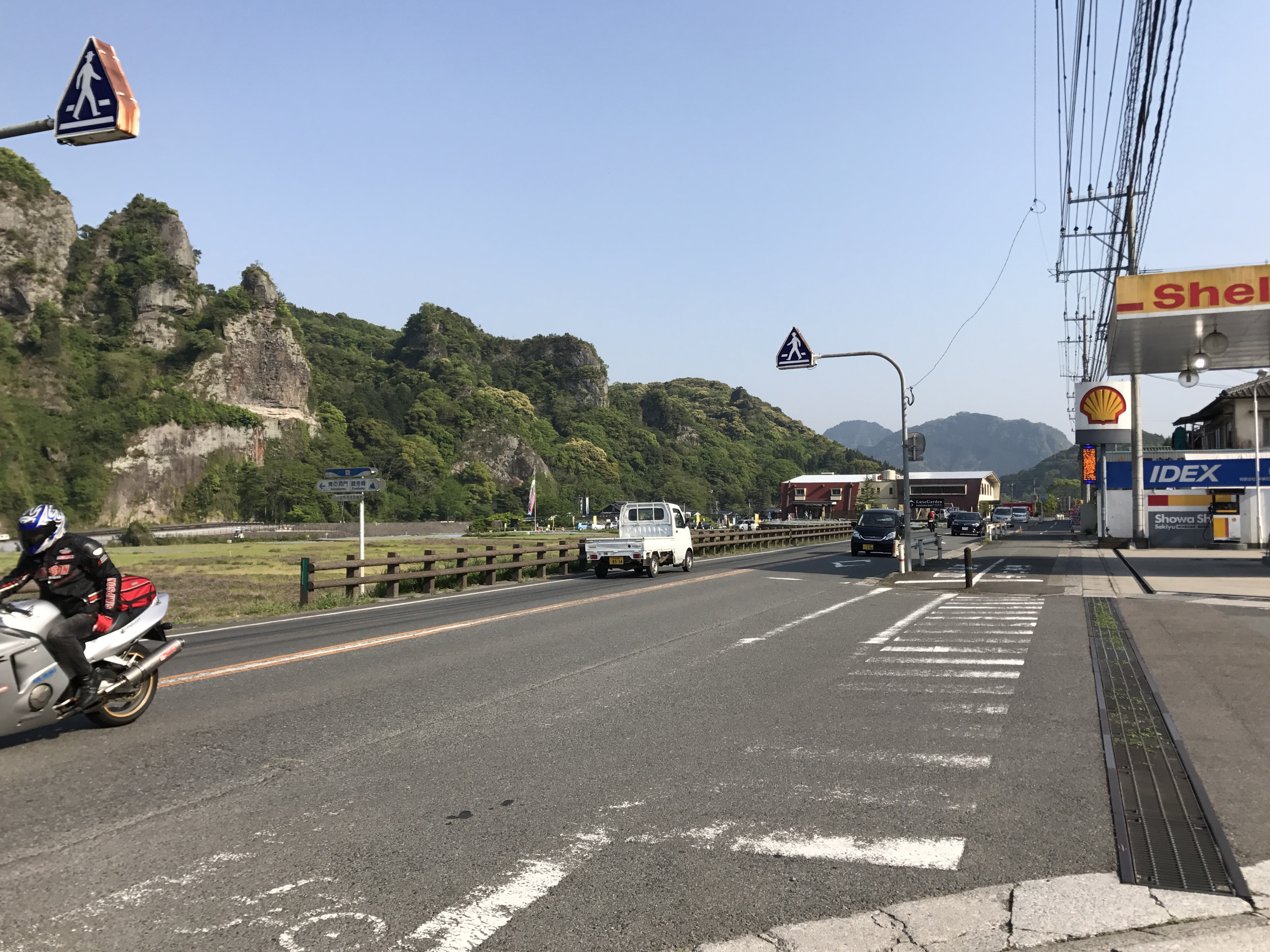

Route information
- Length: 106.8 km (66.4 mi)
- Existed: 18 May 1953–present

Major junctions
- North end: National Route 213 in Nakatsu
- South end: National Route 57 in Aso

Location
- Country: Japan

Highway system
- National highways of Japan; Expressways of Japan
← National Route 211	→ National Route 213

National Route 212 is a national highway of Japan connecting Nakatsu, Ōita, and Aso, Kumamoto, in Japan, with a total length of 106.8 km (66.36 mi).
