= Sandford, Dorset =

Village in Dorset, England

Coordinates: 50.70767°N 2.097022°W

Sandford
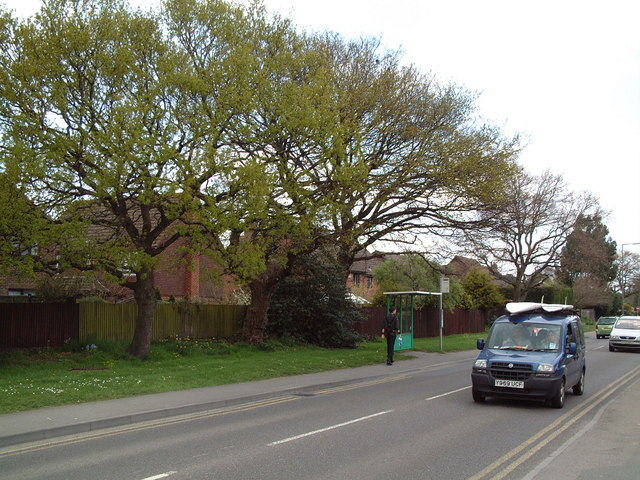
- Sandford Road

- Location within Dorset
- OS grid reference: SY931898
- Civil parish: Wareham St. Martin
- Unitary authority: Dorset
- Ceremonial county: Dorset
- Region: South West
- Country: England
- Sovereign state: United Kingdom
- Police: Dorset
- Fire: Dorset and Wiltshire
- Ambulance: South Western
- UK Parliament: Mid Dorset and North Poole

Sandford is a village in the English county of Dorset, on the A351 road some two miles from Wareham and seven miles from Poole.

Sandford forms the only significant settlement within the civil parish of Wareham St. Martin, which otherwise covers much of the rural area to the north of Wareham. The parish was formerly part of the Purbeck local government district and now lies within the unitary authority of Dorset. It is within the Mid Dorset and North Poole constituency of the House of Commons. Prior to Brexit in 2020, it was in the South West England constituency of the European Parliament. The electoral ward is also called St. Martin, and includes Holton Heath with the surrounding countryside. The village contains one school, Sandford St Martin's Primary School. The total population at the 2011 census was 2,774.

To the north lies Gore Heath, part of Wareham Forest, which is the subject of a controversial proposal for gravel extraction.
