= Winterborne Monkton =

Village in Dorset, England

Coordinates: 50.69°N 2.4587°W

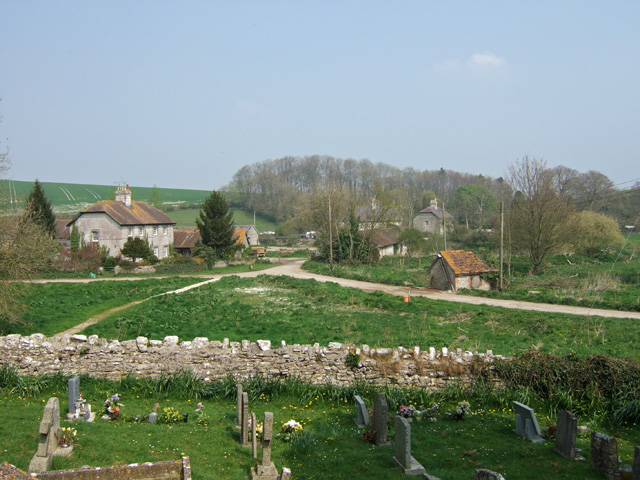
- Winterborne Monkton

- Location within Dorset
- Population: 50
- OS grid reference: SY676878
- Unitary authority: Dorset
- Ceremonial county: Dorset
- Region: South West
- Country: England
- Sovereign state: United Kingdom
- Post town: Dorchester
- Postcode district: DT2
- Police: Dorset
- Fire: Dorset and Wiltshire
- Ambulance: South Western
- UK Parliament: West Dorset

Winterborne Monkton is a small village and civil parish in the county of Dorset in southern England. It lies close to the A354 road between the county town Dorchester, 1.5 miles (2.4 km) to the north, and the coastal resort Weymouth, 5 miles (8.0 km) to the south. Dorset County Council's 2013 mid-year estimate of the parish population was 50.

Winterborne Monkton village consists of a few houses and the church of St Simon & St Jude.

The hill fort of Maiden Castle stands to the northwest.
