= Upton Clock Tower =

Clock tower in Upton, England

Coordinates: 50.7386°N 2.0293°W

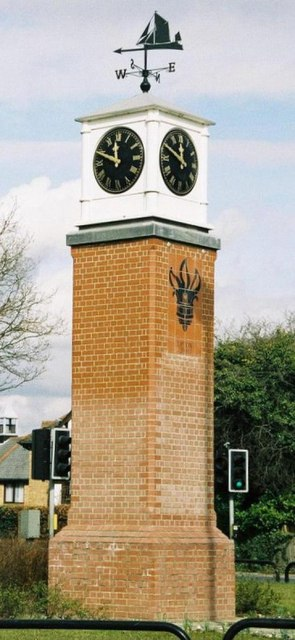
The clock tower in 2005.

The Upton Clock Tower is a landmark in Upton, Dorset.

== History ==
The clock tower was built to celebrate the new millennium in 2000.

In 2014, an Armistice Day plaque was added to the side of the clock tower.

In April 2024, an ornamental beehive was stolen from the clock tower.
