= Hillyfields, Hampshire =

Suburb of Southampton, England

Coordinates: 50.937685°N 1.46596°W

Hilyfields
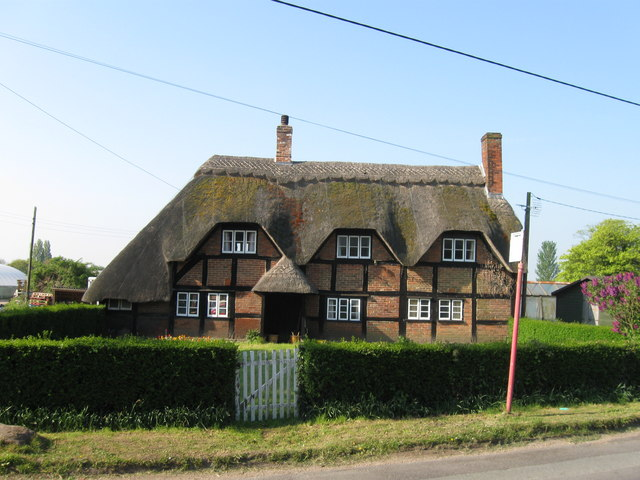
- Farmhouse, Hillyfields

- Location within Hampshire
- OS grid reference: SU3608115485
- Civil parish: Nursling and Rownhams
- District: Test Valley
- Shire county: Hampshire
- Region: South East
- Country: England
- Sovereign state: United Kingdom
- Post town: SOUTHAMPTON
- Postcode district: SO16
- Dialling code: 023
- Police: Hampshire and Isle of Wight
- Fire: Hampshire and Isle of Wight
- Ambulance: South Central
- UK Parliament: Romsey and Southampton North

Hillyfields is a village and suburb of Southampton in the civil parish of Nursling and Rownhams, in the Test Valley district of Hampshire, England. The suburb lies east of the River Test and M271 motorway.
