= Downton, Hampshire =

Hamlet in Hampshire, England

Coordinates: 50.74°N 01.62°W

Downton
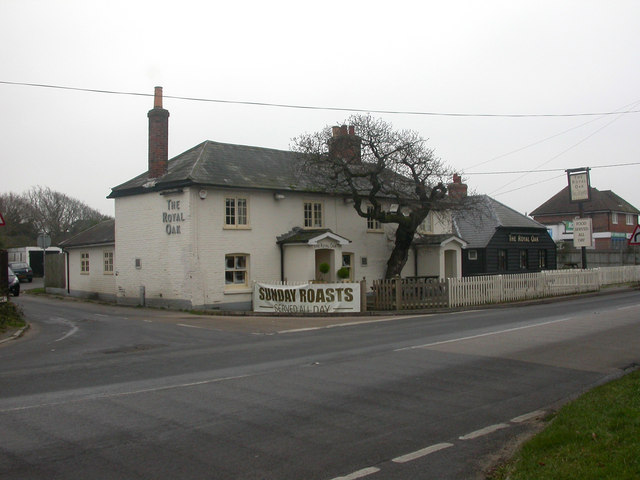
- Downton, The Royal Oak

- Location within Hampshire
- OS grid reference: SZ2693
- Civil parish: Hordle; Milford-on-Sea
- District: New Forest
- Shire county: Hampshire
- Region: South East
- Country: England
- Sovereign state: United Kingdom
- Post town: LYMINGTON
- Postcode district: SO41
- Police: Hampshire and Isle of Wight
- Fire: Hampshire and Isle of Wight
- Ambulance: South Central
- UK Parliament: New Forest West

Downton is a hamlet in Hampshire, England, clustered around a crossroads on the A337 road (Lymington to New Milton) with a lane to the sea southwards whilst another lane leads north to Hordle. Most of the population today live in the part that has been re-allocated to the civil parish of Milford-on-Sea (in which statistical urban area the majority of the population at the 2011 Census was included); the area north of the A337 is in Hordle. Part of the Green belt, its population fluctuates as it has two holiday/static home parks with amenities and some small camp sites.

== Lengthened accessway to coast ==
The part of the cliff and beach known as Taddiford Gap most associated with Downton has become inaccessible directly from Downton due to coastal erosion. A forest path through Shorefield Holiday Park reaches West Road car park, with amenities, from which Hordle Cliff Beach (also known as Milford Beach) can be accessed, more than five miles of favourable bathing and sunbathing, weather and conditions depending.

== History ==
Downton is first mentioned in the Pipe rolls for 1160 as a 'new place'. The name is first recorded as Dunchinton although more commonly Donketon and Coates states that this is most likely derived from Dunneca's farm or otherwise from *OE dunnocatu-n (farm of hedge sparrows). In 1263 the estate seems to have belonged to Thomas de Orweye although, by 1397, it had expanded to include part of Everton in Milford. After c. 1500 the manor became part of the extensive possessions of the Milles family of Southampton, builders of Hurst Castle. The manor was purchased at end of the 18th century by Sir William Cornwallis (with adjoining manors in Milford) whose heir, Anne Whitby was the grandmother of Col. William Cornwallis-West. His son George Cornwallis-West went bankrupt around 1920 and the estate was sold. The western part, owned by the Ashley Clinton family, was sold a few years later although the planned large scale development was prevented.

Piecemeal house building followed for the next few decades. Before the 1980s, the A337 road west of Downton made six sharp turns, but the road has since been straightened.

The region has always been one of dispersed settlement although the inn known as The Royal Oak, Downton provided one centre for the provision of services in Hordle. Whilst the inn remains, today the adjacent businesses are car-related. In 2009 permission was granted for gravel extraction on a nearby site, despite opposition from local residents.
