= Upton Heath =

Heathland in central southern England

Coordinates: 50.750°N 2.022°W

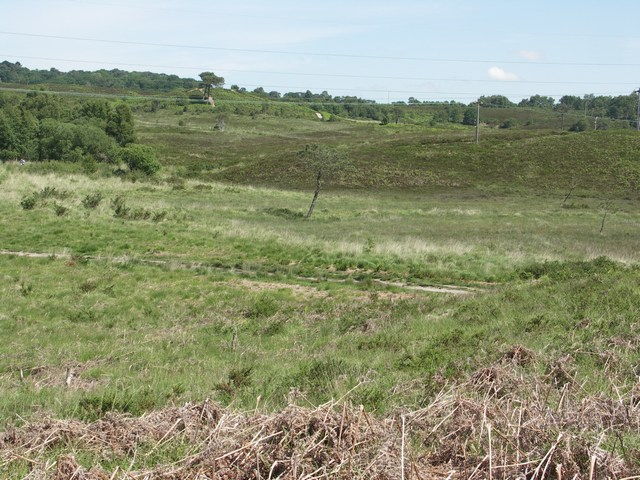
Typical countryside on Upton Heath

Upton Heath is one of the largest remaining fragments of a heath that once stretched across central southern England from Dorchester to Christchurch and beyond. It is now confined to an area immediately west of Upton and Poole, much of which is protected. From the Heath there are views across Poole Harbour, Corfe Castle and the Isle of Purbeck.

== Geography ==
Upton Heath is part of the natural region of the Dorset Heaths and covers an area of 205 hectares. It lies within the Poole Basin and is bounded by the village of Corfe Mullen to the north, the Poole district of Broadstone to the northeast, Creekmoor to the east, the A35 dual carriageway to the south and the hamlet of Beacon Hill to the southwest. Lytchett Matravers lies about 4 kilometres to the west beyond Lychett Heath and the village of Upton lies to the south over the other side of the A35. The highest point on Upton Heath is the trig point at SY983956, which has extensive views to the south.

== Nature Reserve ==
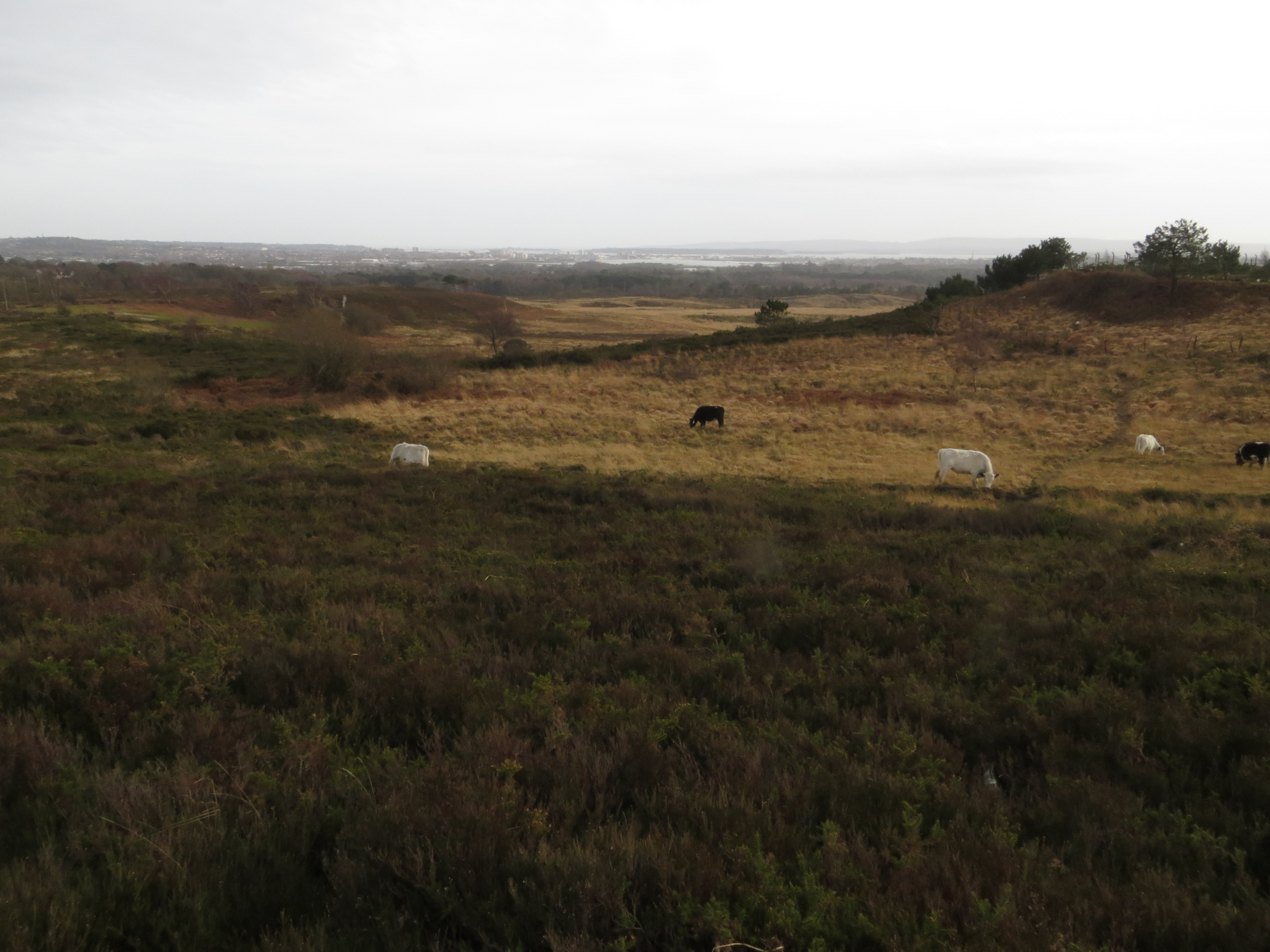
Upton Heath looking towards Poole Harbour

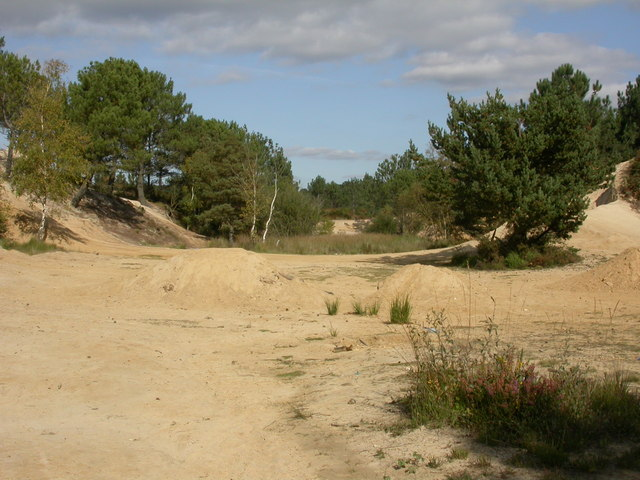
Old sandpit on Upton Heath

Much of the area has been designated as the Upton Heath Nature Reserve and is largely managed by the Dorset Wildlife Trust. It is wild, wet and generally unsuitable for building which is why it was not developed as Poole expanded. However abandoned sand pits and clay pits reflect its historic use for the pottery and brick making industries.

=== Fauna and flora ===
Of particular interest on the heath are its reptiles – all six native British reptile species are found in the dry areas of the heath: the adder, grass snake, smooth snake, slowworm, viviparous lizard and sand lizard. Resident birds include the European stonechat, European nightjar, and rare Dartford warbler. In addition, the boggy areas support many dragonfly species as well as carnivorous round-leaved sundew and raft spiders. Local butterflies including the silver-studded blue and grayling. Amongst the rare flowering plants on the reserve are the marsh gentian and Dorset heath.

=== Heath fires ===
In June 2011, one third of the heath was devastated by what one source described as the "worst fire at Upton Heath for 35 years". Local people had to evacuate their homes and 200 firefighters were engaged as the fire spread rapidly over a square kilometre. Dorset Wildlife Trust said that the fire had happened at the peak of the bird and reptile breeding season and had put wildlife development back 25 years. Two men believed to be responsible for starting the fire were being sought by police and the Crimestoppers offered a reward.

In the aftermath of the Upton Heath Fire, an organisation called Heathwatch was formed with local people volunteering to act as wardens. Two men, wanted by police, were arrested as a result of the initiative.

On 5 August 2022, a wildfire broke out on Upton Heath. Investigators believe the fire was started deliberately.

== Access ==
There is a public car park just northeast of the trig point. Otherwise access is limited due to the difficult terrain. There are public footpaths along the perimeter of the heath and one along the line of the dismantled railway in the south of the area.

Trail leaflets describing walks on the heath are available from Dorset Wildlife Trust.
