= Slepe =

Hamlet in Dorset, England

Coordinates: 50°44′19″N 2°06′05″W

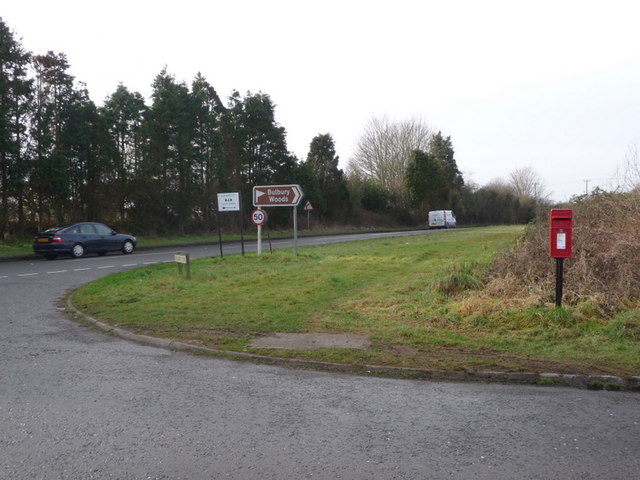
- This postbox, alongside the A35, used to serve the village of Slepe until it was removed in 2024.

- Location within Dorset
- OS grid reference: SY929933
- Unitary authority: Dorset
- Ceremonial county: Dorset
- Region: South West
- Country: England
- Sovereign state: United Kingdom
- Police: Dorset
- Fire: Dorset and Wiltshire
- Ambulance: South Western
- UK Parliament: Mid Dorset and North Poole

Slepe is a hamlet in the county of Dorset, England. It is located on the A35 east of Organford.
