= Lytchett Minster and Upton =

Civil parish in Dorset, England

Coordinates: 50.7381°N 2.0407°W

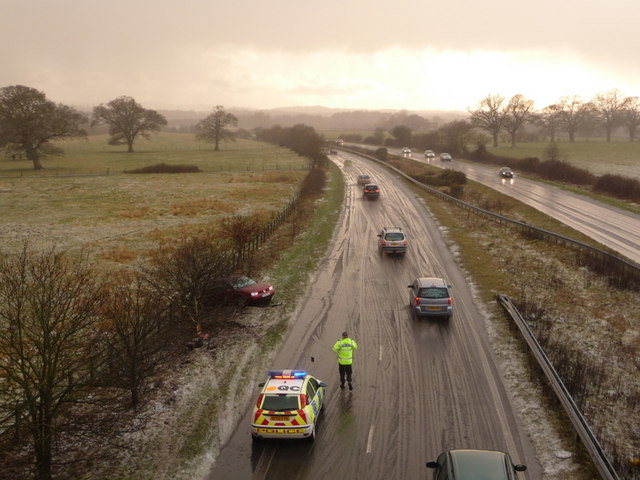
- A35 road between Lytchett Minster and Upton

- Location within Dorset
- Area: 14.35 km^{2} (5.54 sq mi)
- Population: 7,573 (2001 census)
  - Density: 528/km^{2} (1,370/sq mi)
- Civil parish: Lytchett Minster and Upton
- Unitary authority: Dorset
- Ceremonial county: Dorset
- Region: South West
- Country: England
- Sovereign state: United Kingdom
- UK Parliament: Mid Dorset and North Poole

Lytchett Minster and Upton, formerly just Lytchett Minster, is a civil parish in the Dorset district, in the ceremonial county of Dorset, England. The parish comprises the village of Lytchett Minster and the nearby built up area of Upton, which is contiguous with the urban area of Poole.

The parish has an area of 14.35 square kilometres. At the time of the 2001 census, it had a population of 7,573 living in 3,227 dwellings. It is within the Mid Dorset and North Poole constituency of the House of Commons. On 19 July 1986 the parish was rename from "Lytchett Minster" to "Lytchett Minster & Upton".

It was in Poole Rural District from 1894 to 1933, and Wareham and Purbeck Rural District from 1933 to 1974. It was then in Purbeck District from 1974 until Dorset became a unitary district in 2019.
