= Hiji Bypass =

Road in Japan

Hiji Bypass
- 国道%route%号
- 日出バイパス

Route information
- Maintained by West Nippon Expressway Company
- Length: 9.0 km (5.6 mi)
- Existed: 2002–present
- Component highways: National Route 10

Major junctions
- From: Hayami Interchange; Higashikyushu Expressway in Hiji, Ōita
- To: Hiji Interchange; National Route 213 / Ōita Airport Road in Hiji, Ōita

Location
- Country: Japan

Highway system
- National highways of Japan; Expressways of Japan

Hiji Bypass (日出バイパス, Hiji Baipasu) is a toll road in Ōita Prefecture. It is owned and operated by the West Nippon Expressway Company (NEXCO West Japan). The route is signed E97 under Ministry of Land, Infrastructure, Transport and Tourism's "2016 Proposal for Realization of Expressway Numbering."

== Junction list ==
The entire expressway is in Ōita Prefecture.

| Location | km | mi | Exit | Name | Destinations | Notes |
|---|---|---|---|---|---|---|
| Hiji | 0 | 0.0 | 13 | Hayami | Higashikyushu Expressway (Usa-Beppu Road)– Beppu, Oita, Usa, Fukuoka, Kitakyushu; Oita Prefecture Route 24 | |
| Hiji | 9.0 | 5.6 | 1 | Hiji | National Route 10– Central Hiji, Beppu, Oita, Nakatsu, Kitakyushu | |
Through to National Route 213 / Ōita Airport Road
1.000 mi = 1.609 km; 1.000 km = 0.621 mi

== See also ==
- Japan National Route 10
