= Creekmoor =

Settlement in Dorset, England

Coordinates: 50°44′43″N 2°00′14″W

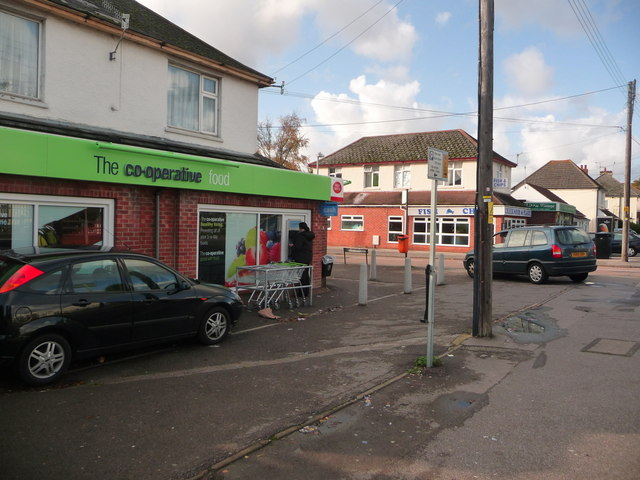
Shops at Creekmoor

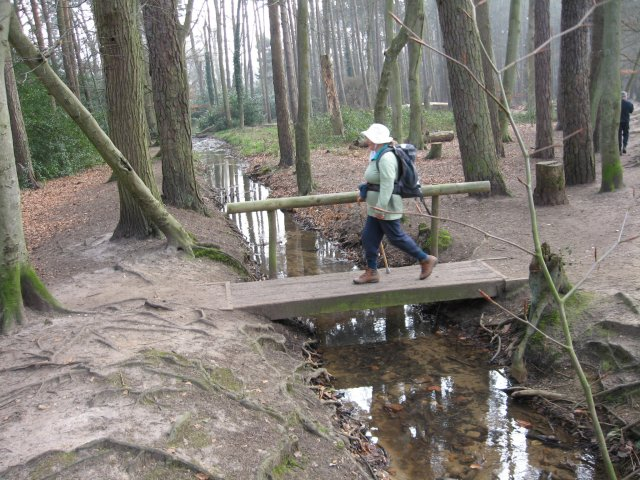
Upton Heath woodland on the western border of Creekmoor

Creekmoor is a suburb and electoral ward of Poole in Dorset, England. The ward, which also contains the Waterloo neighbourhood, has a population of 9,470. Bordered by the Upton Heath Nature Reserve and Upton Country Park, the area is mainly populated by families.

== Facilities ==
Shopping in Creekmoor includes a Co-Op Supermarket, a pet shop, and a pharmacy which are accessed via a large free car park. Creekmoor also contains a Makro Superstore, and some smaller shops including a convenience store.

There is a chip shop and a Chinese takeaway located on Creekmoor Lane. The local pub is called "The Acorn".

== Politics ==
Creekmoor is part of the Creekmoor ward which elects two councillors to Bournemouth, Christchurch and Poole Council, and also the Poole parliamentary constituency. As of 2024 it is represented by Judy Butt of the Poole Engage Party and Paul Slade of the Liberal Democrats.
