= Trigon Hill =

Hill in Dorset, England

Highest point
- Elevation: 54 m (177 ft)
- Prominence: 35 m (115 ft)
- Parent peak: Lewesdon Hill
- Listing: TuMP
- Coordinates: 50.7078°N 2.1537°W

Geography
- Location: Dorset, England
- OS grid: SY892898
- Topo map: OS Explorer OL15E

Trigon Hill is a hill on the edge of a clay pit near Cold Harbour, Dorset, on the Dorset Heaths. It rises about 3 kilometres northwest of the centre of Wareham.
