= Woolsbarrow Hillfort =

Hillfort in Dorset, England

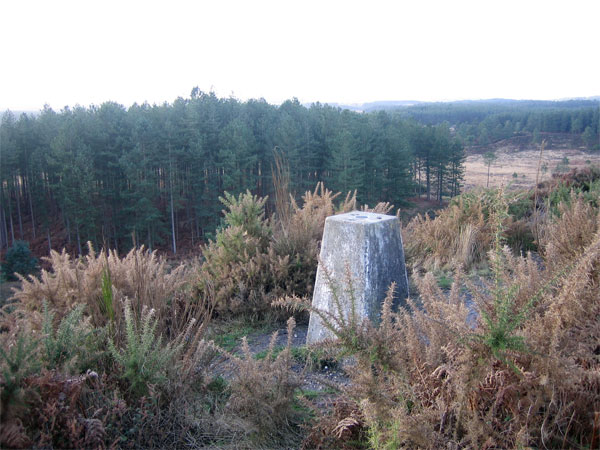
- Trig point on top of the hillfort
- Interactive map of Woolsbarrow Hillfort
- 50°43′53.07″N 2°9′10.96″W
- Location: Dorset
- Region: England

History
- Built: Late Bronze Age to the Early Iron Age (8th - 5th centuries BC)

Site notes
- Elevation: 67 m (220 ft)
- Area: 2 1/4 acres (0.91 ha)

Identifiers
- Atlas of Hillforts: 1018437

Scheduled monument
- Designated: 26 February 1962

Woolsbarrow Hillfort is a hillfort on Bloxworth Heath in the county of Dorset, England. It dates to the period from the Late Bronze Age to the Early Iron Age (8th–5th centuries BC) and is classed as an ancient monument. Despite the hillfort only being at an altitude of 220 feet (67 m) it is said to "dominate the surrounding heathland."

== Location ==
Woolsbarrow Hillfort is located in a clearing in the forests of Bloxworth Heath. The nearest town is Bere Regis, about 3 1/4 miles (5.2 km) to the west-northwest of the hillfort. The heath is a popular walking area and the site can be reached by public footpath.

== Description ==
Woolsbarrow is a slight univallate hillfort on a flat-topped knoll on the plateau of Bloxworth Heath, which separates the rivers Sherford to the east and Piddle to the west. The hillfort is marked by a single rampart about 20 feet (6.1 m) below the top of the gravel knoll and covers an area of around 2 1/4 acres (0.91 ha). The eastern part of the hillfort has been damaged by sand and gravel extraction, but much of it survives well and has the potential for further archaeological evidence to be uncovered.

It is one of only about 150 slight univallate hillforts nationally and is of national importance.
