= A337 road =

Road in southern England

A337

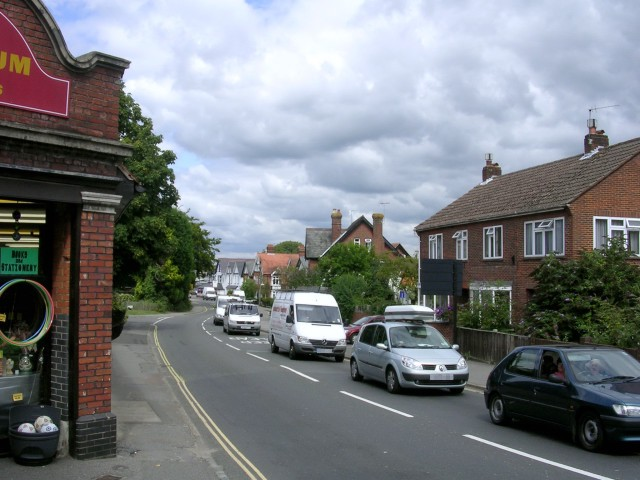
- Traffic queuing on the A337 (Romsey Road) in Lyndhurst

Route information
- Length: 21.5 mi (34.6 km)

Major junctions
- north end: Cadnam; 50.9202°N 1.5817°W
- A31 A336; A35
- southwest end: Christchurch; 50.7426°N 1.7405°W

Location
- Country: United Kingdom
- Constituent country: England

Road network
- Roads in the United Kingdom; Motorways; A and B road zones
← A336	→ A338

The A337 road is a road in southern England that runs from the M27 motorway in Hampshire to Christchurch in Dorset.

== Route of Road ==
The A337 begins at junction 1 of the M27 motorway near Cadnam. It heads south through the New Forest to the large village of Lyndhurst. On account of the A337 being one of only a few main roads into the New Forest, it is frequently congested. In Lyndhurst the A337 meets the A35 road, and rings Lyndhurst village centre as a large roundabout. It continues south through the village of Brockenhurst, where it crosses the South West Main Line at a level crossing, to the town of Lymington. In Lymington the A337 avoids the town centre, and heads west through Everton and Downton to the town of New Milton. It crosses the border into Dorset, travels through Highcliffe High Street and terminates at a roundabout with the A35 road in Christchurch.
