= Japan National Route 213 =

National highway in Japan

National Route 213
- 国道213号
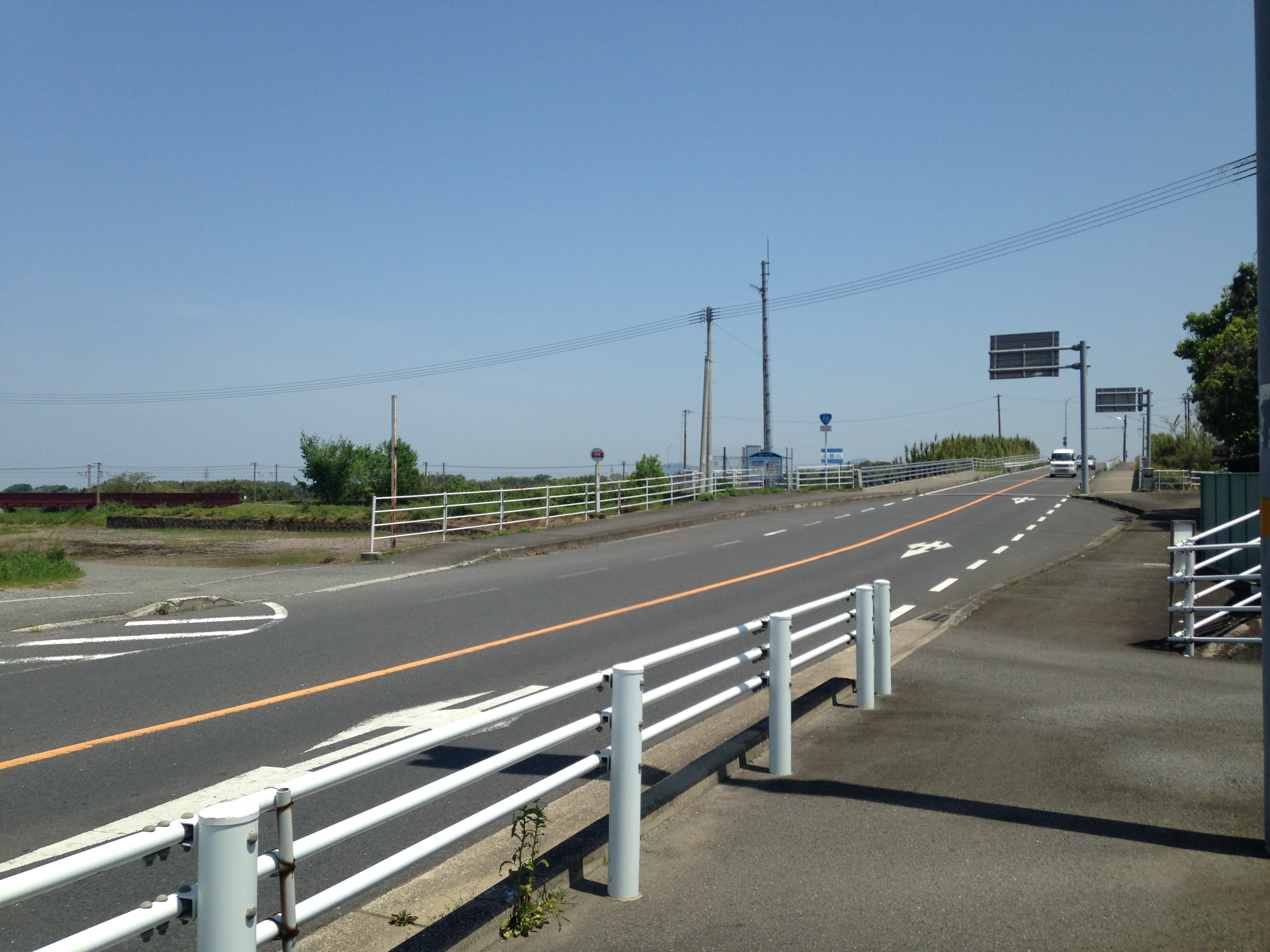

Route information
- Length: 124.8 km (77.5 mi)
- Existed: 18 May 1953–present

Major junctions
- North end: National Route 212 in Nakatsu
- South end: National Route 10 in Beppu

Location
- Country: Japan

Highway system
- National highways of Japan; Expressways of Japan
← National Route 212	→ National Route 217

National Route 213 is a national highway of Japan connecting Beppu and Nakatsu in Japan, with a total length of 124.8 km (77.55 mi).
