= Wareham Forest =

Heath in Dorset, England

- Location within Dorset
- Interactive map of Wareham Forest

Geography
- Location: Dorset, England
- OS grid: SY900900
- Coordinates: 50.718°N 2.166°W

Wareham Forest is an area of countryside in Dorset, England, consisting of open heathland, including Decoy Heath and Gore Heath, and plantations of conifers such as Morden Heath and Bloxworth Heath. The site is managed by Forestry England for conservation and recreation. Situated next to the A35 road between Dorchester and Poole; the forest provides a home for sika deer, the Dartford warbler and a population of sand lizards.

== History ==
Wareham Forest featured in the American magazine Life on 20 October 1947. The article describes a fire that raged for four days across Wareham Heath in the summer of that year. The fire severed the road from Wareham to Bere Regis and exploded ammunition left behind from Second World War troop manoeuvres. The photograph accompanying the Life piece shows fire-fighters trying to counteract the blaze, which saw flames leap to over 150 feet in height. Thanks to these efforts, a majority of the forest was saved. A 55-acre tourist park and campsite now makes up part of Wareham Forest. In 2012, a married couple walking their dog over the heath had to be rescued by the Dorset Fire and Rescue Service, after they became stuck in a freezing swamp. In May 2020, a large-scale fire, the Wareham Forest fire, was believed to have been started by a disposable barbecue or camp fire and worsened by warm, dry conditions. The fire left 550 acres (220 hectares) of the forest damaged.

== Ecosystem ==
A track that passes through the site comprises part of the 'Wareham Forest Way', a walk that leads from Wareham to Sturminster Marshall. There is also a route for cyclists called the Sika Cycle Trail. Situated to the east of the forest is Morden Bog National Nature Reserve. Calluna (or heather) and grasses such as Molinia caerulea (or purple moor grass) grow readily at Wareham Forest, give grazing fodder to a population of sika. The nationally scarce Dartford warbler and the nightjar has been observed around here, and sand lizards may also be spotted. The iconic fly agaric (Amanita muscaria), hallucinogenic toadstool, has been recorded within the forest. In 2006 the Journal of Zoology published the results of a nine-year study that looked into the breeding frequency of the site's smooth snakes (Coronella austriaca).

== In fiction ==
The forest provides a backdrop for scenes within R. Hyslop's Wolf's-Head novel, set in the time of Æthelwulf of Wessex.
