= Holton Heath =

Area of Wareham St Martin, Dorset, England

Coordinates: 50.717°N 2.074°W

Holton Heath is an area of the parish of Wareham St Martin, Dorset, England. The area includes a trading estate, on the site of the former Royal Navy Cordite Factory, Holton Heath, (RNCF). East of the trading estate is the Holton Heath National Nature Reserve, currently closed to the public.

The area is served by the Holton Heath railway station.

== History ==
In 1890 Baronet and MP Sir Elliott Lees bought land in Dorset and moved into South Lytchett Manor, in Lytchett Minster, north-east of Holton Heath. Much of the Holton land was requisitioned by the Royal Navy for a cordite factory (RNCF) in the First World War but the family retained East Holton Farm, later to become Holton Lee, an environmental and arts centre for disabled people.

Holton Heath was chosen in 1914 because of its remote location, away from centres of population, and its good transportation links, on a backwater of Poole Harbour, adjacent to the London and South Western Railway, and the A351 Wareham to Poole road.

Holton Heath railway station was opened to serve the RNCF. A jetty, Rockley Jetty, was also constructed in Poole Harbour just outside the main site, to transport cordite by boat to Gosport. The jetty was linked into the factory's railway system.

During the Second World War, the site was a target for German bombers and so a plan to protect it was instigated. This consisted of creating several "Starfish" decoy sites in the village of Arne, three miles to the south east, containing flammable material that would be ignited to give the appearance of a burning building. This was put to the test on the night of 3–4 June 1942 when bombers dropped hundreds of bombs on the decoy site, practically destroying the village of Arne, but leaving the Cordite Factory unscathed.

The cordite factory at Holton Heath closed after the Second World War and the site became an Admiralty research establishment. In the late 1990s the military left the site altogether.
