= M27 motorway =

Motorway in Hampshire, England

M27
- M27 highlighted in blue
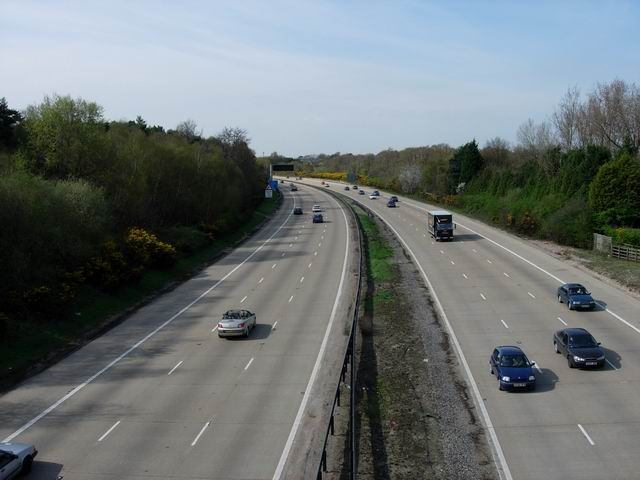
- Between junctions 5 and 7, (Note: There is no junction 6.) 2006

Route information
- Maintained by National Highways
- Length: 27.9 mi (44.9 km)
- Existed: 1972–present
- History: Constructed 1972–83

Major junctions
- West end: Cadnam; 50.9182°N 1.5930°W
- J3 → M271 motorway J4 → M3 motorway J9 ->A27 J12 → M275 motorway
- East end: Portsmouth; 50.8366°N 1.0650°W

Location
- Country: United Kingdom
- Primary destinations: Southampton, Fareham, Portsmouth, (Ringwood), (Bournemouth), (Salisbury), (Winchester), (Chichester)

Road network
- Roads in the United Kingdom; Motorways; A and B road zones
← M26	→ M32

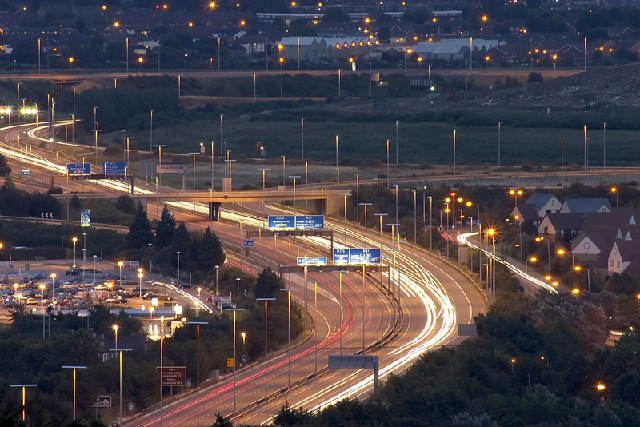
Looking down onto the M27 from Portsdown Hill

The M27 is a motorway in Hampshire, England. It is 27.9 miles (44.9 km) long and runs between Cadnam and Portsmouth. It was opened in stages between 1975 and 1983, providing the largest two urban areas in Hampshire (Southampton and Portsmouth) with a direct motorway link. An extension into the county of West Sussex was planned but never constructed. A number of smaller motorways were proposed, connecting the city centres of Southampton and Portsmouth to the motorway; of these only the M271 and M275 were built. Three sections of the M27 have since been widened to four lanes each way, the first between junctions 7 and 8, the second between junctions 3 and 4, and the third begins at the slip road where junction 11 joins until mid-way to junction 12.

== Route ==
Running approximately parallel both to the coast of the Solent and to the A27, the M27 starts as an eastwards continuation of the A31 from Bournemouth and Poole, at Cadnam in the New Forest. The motorway meets the A36 from Salisbury, crosses the Wessex Main Line railway, and then meets the M271 to central Southampton. After the M271, the road becomes a dual four lane motorway and passes Rownhams services, it then meets the M3, (two lanes going off, two lanes continuing to the other side of the junction) reverting to a dual three lane motorway as it passes to the north of Southampton, passes Southampton Airport, meeting junction 7 and becoming dual four lanes again, then becoming dual three lanes after junction 8, it then runs alongside the West Coastway Line as it heads south-east towards Fareham. It then runs alongside the northern outskirts of Fareham, briefly with a fourth climbing lane in either direction, before its junction with the M275 to Portsmouth. Very shortly after this point the motorway ends, becoming the A27, a four lane dual carriageway almost to motorway standards until the junction with the A3 (M) motorway. The official reason for this section of road not being a continuation of the motorway is the hard shoulders being too narrow. Although the M275 which the M27 junctions with, has no hard shoulders along its entire length.

== History ==
=== Planning ===
In 1964 it was called the South Coast trunk road. In January 1966, seventeen miles of the A27 would have a completely new section from the A3 at Portsbridge to the A33 at Bassett, but there was no mention of any motorway.

A public inquiry was held at Eastleigh, for six weeks, from September 1969. The route was first published on December 12 1968.

There was another public inquiry in early January 1971 into a one-mile section near Swaythling. An earlier route would have been straight through the Ford factory. The route from Chilworth to Windhover was subsequently moved.

The route for eight miles east of Havant was published in early July 1972.

Another public inquiry was held in early July 1976 in Eastleigh, for the connection to the M3, and had much disruption from hecklers.

A service area was planned for Meon, Hampshire near Fareham in 1986.

=== Construction ===
The Funtley to Portsbridge contract was given to Amey on February 28 1973, for £9.5m, being 7.5 miles.

The Chilworth to Ower ten-mile section opened on Monday December 22 1975.

=== Opening dates ===
The M27 was opened in stages (in common with many UK motorways) between 1975 and 1983.

- Junction 1 to 2 opened 20 August 1975
- Junction 2 to 4 opened in December 1975
- Junction 4 to 7 opened in 1983
- Junction 7 to 8 opened in February 1978
- Junction 8 to 12 opened in March 1976

The South Stoneham Crematorium, which was located north of South Stoneham Cemetery, was demolished during 1973 to make way for the construction of the M27 motorway. The South Stoneham garden of remembrance is now located at the north end of the cemetery, adjacent to the motorway.

On 12 October 2026, the newly constructed link road (A3222) for junction 10 opened, allowing eastbound motorway traffic to exit at the junction and local traffic to join the motorway westbound. The previous westbound off-slip is now closed and has been rerouted to the link road, allowing for easier access to join the A32 southbound towards Fareham. The original eastbound on-slip remains in place.

=== Unfulfilled plans ===
There were proposals, by the Institution of Highway Engineers in 1936, for a road that would run all the way along the south coast. The government in their Trunk Roads Act 1946 (9 & 10 Geo. 6. c. 30) established that there should be a trunk road between Folkestone and Honiton. The south coast road did not materialise, however the M27 was developed from these long standing plans. The termination of M27 at Cadnam was due to an understanding with the Verderers of the New Forest that the motorway should not run through the Forest.

The M27 was meant to be extended to Chichester; a sign of this is the width of the A27 road between junction 12 and the junction with the A3(M), which has three or four lanes, a hard shoulder and grade-separated junctions. It is not part of the M27 as its hard shoulders are not quite wide enough to comply with motorway regulations.

The M272 was meant to go from junction 5 through Portswood to the centre of Southampton. The M272 was instead built (in much-reduced form) as the A335 Thomas Lewis Way.

Junction 6 was never built – there were plans for a motorway spur (probably to be numbered M273) connecting the M27 to the centre of the Townhill Park area of Southampton.

The planned Meon Valley Services, service area just east of junction 9 was never constructed. The long westbound exit slip road at junction 9 was designed to allow an entry to and exit from the service area.

=== 2015 incident ===
In November 2015, an elderly woman died after falling from the A3057 bridge that crosses over the M27, into westbound traffic, just before junction 3. She had not taken her anti-psychotic medication, and escaped from her Southampton home through an upstairs window before climbing off the garage roof and running away.

=== Smart motorway conversion ===
In March 2018, work began to convert the section between junctions 11 and 4 to a smart motorway. The scheme will turn the hard shoulder into a permanent fourth running lane, adding refuge areas along the route and installing new CCTV and speed cameras with mandatory variable speed limit signs.

In early January 2019, official work began when average speed cameras were switched on between junctions 5 and 4. Average speed cameras further along on the scheme will be turned on as work continues along the route. The work has suffered repeated delays, originally due to be complete in spring 2021. The commissioning phase began in mid February 2022, during which time the smart motorway technology will be tested, including stopped vehicle detection radars. This is with a fully open carriageway and a 60 mph (97 km/h) speed limit controlled by electronic signs on new gantries and CCTV and speed cameras. The 60 mph limit was lifted on 29 June 2022 when the upgraded section was fully opened and returned to the national speed limit.

=== Junction 5-7 concrete overlay ===
In February 2024, National Highways began a project to resurface the concrete section of the M27 between junctions 5 and 7. A 180 mm (7.1-inch) layer of low noise surface asphalt is being overlaid on top of the existing concrete surface, with the intent of improving the road surface and reduce road noise to neighbours of the motorway. A contraflow system is being used throughout the process and the project is due to be completed by Spring 2026.

== Junctions ==
Data from driver location signs are used to provide distance and carriageway identifier information. Where a junction spans several hundred metres and start and end points are available, both are cited.

M27 motorway junctions
miles	km	Westbound exits (B carriageway)	Junction	Eastbound exits (A carriageway)	Coordinates
0.0; 1.2	0.0; 2.0	Road continues as A31 to The WEST, Poole, Bournemouth and Ringwood	Terminus; J1	Cadnam A336, Brook, Bramshaw B3079, Lyndhurst A337	50.9205°N 1.5896°W
0.0; 1.2	0.0; 2.0	The New Forest, Cadnam, Lyndhurst A337	Terminus; J1	Start of motorway	50.9205°N 1.5896°W
4.2; 4.6	6.8; 7.4	Salisbury A36, Fawley A326	J2	Salisbury, Romsey A36, Fawley A326, Paultons Park	50.9458°N 1.5295°W
6.6; 6.8	10.6; 11.0	Southampton, The Docks M271(S), Romsey M271(N)	J3	Southampton, The Docks M271	50.9458°N 1.4764°W
		Rownhams Services (Roadchef)	Services	Rownhams Services (Roadchef)	50.9573°N 1.4492°W
9.4; 9.8	15.2; 15.7	The MIDLANDS, London, Winchester M3	J4	The MIDLANDS, London, Winchester M3	50.9539°N 1.4077°W
11.7; 11.9	18.9; 19.2	Southampton, Eastleigh, Airport A335	J5	Southampton, Eastleigh, Airport A335	50.9495°N 1.3712°W
		Non- existent	J6	'Non-existent'	
15.5; 15.7	24.9; 25.2	Hedge End A334	J7	Hedge End, Botley A334	50.9170°N 1.3176°W
16.2; 17.0	26.0; 27.4	Southampton, Hamble, East Docks A3024	J8	Southampton (E), Hamble A3024	50.8984°N 1.3122°W
19.9; 20.6	32.1; 33.1	Fareham (W) A27, Whiteley	J9	Fareham (W) A27, Whiteley	50.8743°N 1.2526°W
23.2; 23.5	37.4; 37.8	Alton A32 (Via A32/A3222 link road)	J10	Alton A32 (Via A32/A3222 link road)	50.8668°N 1.1823°W
24.4; 24.7	39.2; 39.8	Fareham (C) A27, Gosport (A32)	J11	Fareham (C) A27, Gosport (A32)	50.8600°N 1.1576°W
27.7; 28.1	44.6; 45.2	Portsmouth, Ferries M275	J12	Cosham, Paulsgrove, Hilsea A27, Portsmouth (W), Ferries M275	50.8421°N 1.0927°W
29.0	46.6	Start of motorway	Terminus	No exit, access to A3 via J12	50.9205°N 1.5896°W
29.0	46.6	Cosham A3(N), Hilsea A3(S)	Terminus	Road continues as A27 to Havant, Portsmouth (E), Chichester, Brighton and London (A3(M))	50.9205°N 1.5896°W
Notes: Distances in kilometres and carriageway identifiers are obtained from driver location signs/location marker posts. Where a junction spans several hundred metres (yards) and the data is available, both the start and finish values for the junction are shown.; Coordinate data from ACME Mapper.
1.000 mi = 1.609 km; 1.000 km = 0.621 mi: Incomplete access

== See also ==
- List of motorways in the United Kingdom
