= A354 road =

Road in England

A354

Route information
- Length: 51 mi (82 km)

Major junctions
- North end: Salisbury; 51.0571°N 1.7946°W
- A338 A350; A35 A352 A353
- South end: Portland; 50.5629°N 2.4493°W

Location
- Country: United Kingdom
- Primary destinations: Salisbury, Blandford Forum, Dorchester, Weymouth, Portland

Road network
- Roads in the United Kingdom; Motorways; A and B road zones

The A354 is a primary route in England which runs from Salisbury in Wiltshire to Easton on the Isle of Portland in Dorset, a total distance of 51 miles (82 km). From Salisbury the road crosses Cranborne Chase. At Woodyates the road follows the route of Ackling Dyke, a Roman Road for a short distance. The A354 briefly merges with the A350 at the Blandford Forum bypass before crossing the Dorset Downs and merging with the A35 at the Puddletown bypass. 7 miles (11 km) to the west it splits from the Dorchester bypass and runs south. The road now bypasses Upwey and Broadwey on a new section of road which has some two lane sections going north and one lane continuously going south towards Weymouth. After the old and new sections meet at Manor Roundabout the road follows down Weymouth Way alongside Radipole Lake. The final stretch runs across a short bridge over Chesil beach onto Portland. Historically the section between Dorchester and Fortuneswell was part of the A37 with the extension to Easton being the original B3154. This section of the A37 became part of the A354 in 1935 but the B3154 was only renumbered as part of the A354 in the 1980s.

== Weymouth Relief Road ==
The project was to build a 3.75-mile (6.04 km) single carriageway road, with a crawler lane along part of it, linking the A354 Manor Roundabout near Radipole wwith the A354 at the top of Ridgeway Hill. The main carriageway of the Weymouth Relief Road opened on Thursday 17 March 2011.

The 2012 Olympics at Portland played a major factor in making £89m funding for the road available.

== The History of Improving the A354 Dorchester Road ==
Date	Event
1983	The Dorset Structure Plan proposed to construct the A354 Weymouth, Ridgeway to Mount Pleasant improvement as a primary route.
December 1987 to April 1988	A public inquiry was held into proposals for development in the Lorton area which included a new single-carriageway route running from Mount Pleasant to Littlemoor. These proposals were refused consent by the Secretary of State.
Between 1989 and 1992	Various studies and consultation exercises undertaken into alternative route options and alignments for a dual carriageway road between the South Dorset Ridgeway and north Weymouth.
1992	Work began on a planning application and Environmental Statement for this scheme.
July 1994	A dual carriageway road along the alignment was granted planning permission.
1996	A public inquiry into the Compulsory Purchase and Side Road Orders was held. The Secretary of State approved these orders. However, work on the scheme was never started as, following a Government review of road construction, the funding for the scheme was not forthcoming. The planning permission lapsed after 5 years. Following the lapse of permission Dorset County Council undertook a review of the previously consented scheme. The previous dual carriageway route was rejected in light of changing policy guidance, developments within the area of the proposed route and new information about the ecological value of areas along the route. A new preferred route for a single carriageway road was identified, running from Manor Roundabout alongside the eastern side of the Weymouth/Dorchester railway to Littlemoor, through Littlemoor and then parallel with the alignment of the railway to the Ridgeway (often referred to as the Orange Route).
December 2003	The Government Office of the South West confirmed that this scheme was 'Provisionally Accepted', subject to completion of all relevant statutory processes and final approval of Ministers.
September 2005	A planning application and Environmental Statement for a road along the preferred route was submitted by Dorset County Council. However, the application was not determined as, following its submission and at the request of the planning authority, the council carried out further studies, including an examination of the potential for further reducing the effects on the environment, especially those parts which are nationally designated. As a result of the council's re-assessment, changes were made to the September 2005 proposals, primarily to the stretch of road through the Area of Outstanding Natural Beauty.
March 2011	The Relief Road was opened.
