= M271 motorway =

Motorway in Hampshire, England

M271
- M271 highlighted in blue
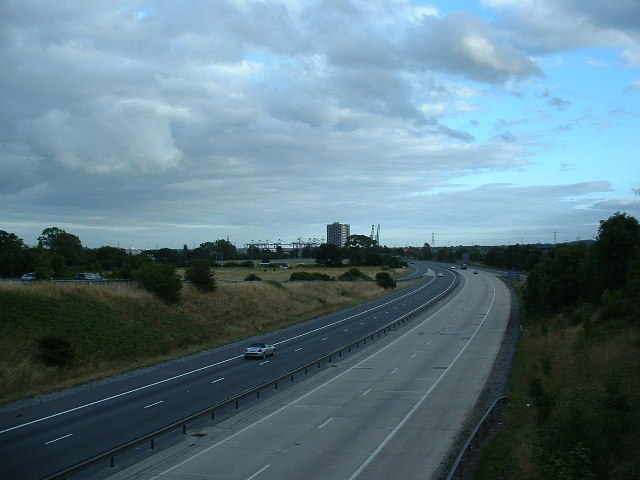

Route information
- Maintained by National Highways
- Length: 3.0 mi (4.8 km)
- Existed: 1975–present

Major junctions
- South end: Totton
- M27 motorway
- North end: Upton

Location
- Country: United Kingdom

Road network
- Roads in the United Kingdom; Motorways; A and B road zones
← M181	→ M275

The M271 is a 3-mile-long (5 km) motorway near Southampton in Hampshire, England. Construction began in 1973 and it opened in 1975. It provides part of the route to Southampton Docks from the M27, which in turn makes up another part of the route to the docks from the nearby M3 Motorway.

== Route ==
The motorway begins at Redbridge near Totton at a grade separated roundabout with the A35, heading north, briefly as a dual three-lane motorway. At its first junction, it reduces to two lanes and continues east of Hillyfields. After a further 1 mile (1.6 km) it reaches a junction with the M27 at a signal controlled roundabout. North of the M27 it enters the countryside and terminates after a further mile of dual two-lane road at another roundabout, this time with the A3057 near Upton.

In 2019, improvement works to the Redbridge Roundabout at the southern end, introduced a dedicated lane to connect the M271 with the A33 towards the docks in a free-flow interchange.

== Junctions ==
County	Location	mi	km	Junction	Destinations	Notes
Hampshire	Southampton	0	0	— (Note: 50.922°N 1.470°W)	A33 - Southampton; A35 - Bournemouth	
Hampshire	Southampton	0.8	1.3	1 (Note: 50.933°N 1.473°W)	Maybush, Nursling	
Hampshire	Southampton	1.6	2.6	— (Note: 50.945°N 1.476°W)	M27 - Bournemouth, Portsmouth	
Hampshire	Southampton	2.3	3.7	— (Note: 50.955°N 1.472°W)	A3057 - Maybush, Nursling, Romsey	
1.000 mi = 1.609 km; 1.000 km = 0.621 mi

*Ceremonial Counties

Coordinate list

== See also ==
- List of motorways in the United Kingdom
