= A35 road =

Major road in southern England

A35

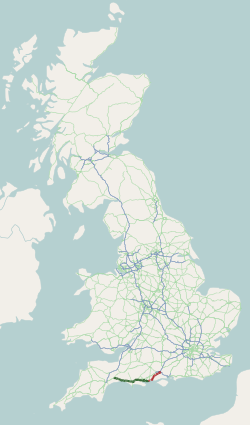

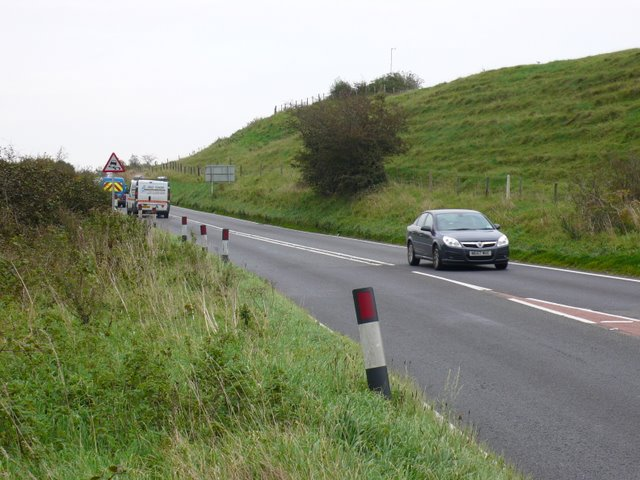
- At Kingston Russell Looking east along the road from Bridport to Dorchester

Route information
- Length: 96.0 mi (154.5 km)

Major junctions
- West end: A30 in Honiton; 50.7939°N 3.2102°W
- A37 near Dorchester A31 near Bere Regis; A36 in Totton M271 in Southampton A33 in Southampton

- East end: A335 in Southampton; 50.9404°N 1.3780°W

Location
- Country: United Kingdom
- Primary destinations: Dorchester (Weymouth); Poole; Bournemouth; Southampton

Road network
- Roads in the United Kingdom; Motorways; A and B road zones
← A34	→ A36

The A35 is a major road in southern England, connecting Honiton in Devon and Southampton in Hampshire. It is a trunk road for some of its length. Most of its route passes through Dorset and the New Forest. It originally connected Exeter and Southampton, the original A35 ran along what is now the A3052 joining the present road at Charmouth.

== Route ==
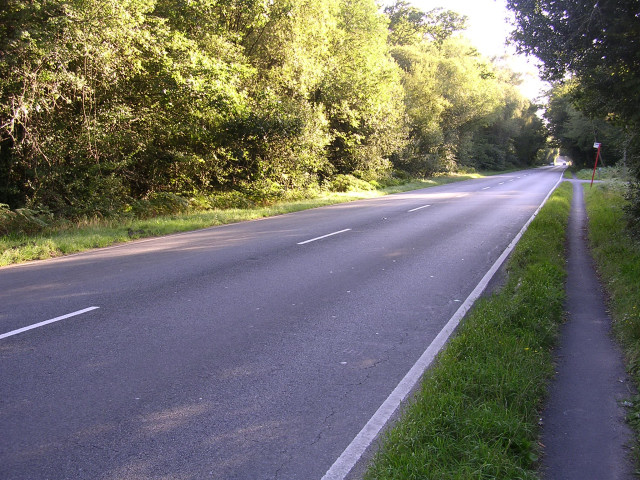
The A35 in the New Forest

Beginning in Honiton at the eastern junction with the A30 road, the A35 travels in a roughly south-easterly direction past Axminster, Charmouth and Bridport. After Bridport, there is a 2-mile (3.2 km) section of dual carriageway, before it reaches its bypass around Dorchester. After Dorchester, there are approximately 8 miles (13 km) of dual carriageway, including the Puddletown bypass, until it reaches its roundabout with the A31 road at Bere Regis. Continuing roughly south-easterly still, it becomes dual carriageway again near Upton, before returning to a single carriageway through Poole and Bournemouth, apart from a small section of dual carriageway on Wessex Way. On reaching Christchurch, there is a dual-carriageway bypass. It then heads in a north-easterly direction through the New Forest, passing through Lyndhurst where it meets the A337 road (to Lymington). It continues through Ashurst and Totton, meeting the A36 road and M271 motorway at grade separated junctions. It then turns north-east, acting as the western part of Southampton's ring road, with the A27 road making up the eastern part. It terminates at Swaythling, on the northern outskirts of Southampton.

== History ==
=== 1922 - Road classification ===
The road number was created with the 1922 classification of roads in the United Kingdom. At that time its western terminus was on the then A30 in Heavitree, Exeter. In 1966 the section from Charmouth to Exeter was de-trunked and renumbered to A3052, with the A35 directed over the former A373 to Honiton, terminating at the then-new A30 Honiton Bypass. This added the narrow 220-foot (67 m) long Charmouth Tunnel to the route, built in 1832 to avoid the summit of Thistle Hill.

=== 1987/88 - Building of Dorchester and Bridport Bypasses ===
The A35 is a main route along England's south coast, and was congested. To help solve the congestion, sections of the A35 were upgraded between Honiton and Poole. In 1969 the Ministry of Transport recorded the case for bypasses around Bridport and Dorchester. The 2.4-mile (3.9 km) bypass to the south of Bridport opened almost two decades later in 1987, followed by the 3.7-mile (6.0 km) bypass to the south of Dorchester in 1988.

=== 1990/91 - Building of Axminster and Charmouth Village Bypasses ===
Following the re-routing onto the former A373 road, a major traffic bottleneck was the town of Axminster. A much-desired southern bypass for the town was indefinitely postponed in 1980 by the then Parliamentary Under-Secretary of State for Transport, Kenneth Clarke. The 3.65-kilometre (2.27-mile) project was eventually authorized by Act of Parliament in 1987, with construction beginning in 1990 approximately following the line of a Roman road. Charmouth village was bypassed in 1990, with the Charmouth Tunnel bypassed at the same time. The defunct tunnel was converted into a shooting range in 2010.

=== 1999 - Puddletown Bypass ===
The Puddletown dual carriageway bypass which opened in 1999 (together with the A30 Honiton-Exeter dualling) were financed under a Design, Build, Finance and Operate (DBFO) contract running from 1996 to 2026.

=== 2004-2007 - Road straightening between Slepe and Upton ===
An on-line straightening between Slepe and the Upton bypass was carried out in 2004, and the extension of the 50 miles per hour (80 km/h) speed limit west of Slepe by 1 mile (1.6 km) in 2007.

=== Bournemouth Centenary Way diversion ===
In Bournemouth, it has been diverted around the Sovereign Centre of Boscombe along Centenary Way resulting in a 1.9-mile (3.1 km) concurrency with the A338; much of its former route is now pedestrianised.

== Junction list ==
County	Location	mi	km	Destinations	Notes
Devon	Honiton	0.0	0.0	A30 to M5 / A303 / A373 / A375 – Exeter, Andover, Yeovil, London, Cullompton, Sidmouth	Western terminus
Devon	Honiton	0.4	0.64	A375 south – Town centre, Cullompton	A375 signed eastbound only; northern terminus of A375
Devon	Axminster	9.5	15.3	A358 to A3052 – Musbury, Seaton, Axminster, Sidmouth	To A3052, Axminster, and Sidmouth signed westbound only
Dorset	Charmouth	14.2	22.9	A3052 west / Axminster Road – Lyme Regis, Charmouth	Eastern terminus of A3052
Dorset	Bridport	22.6	36.4	A3066 north (Sea Road North) / B3162 (East Street) – Town centre, Crewkerne, Bradpole, Melplash	B3162 signed westbound only; southern terminus of A3066
Dorset	Winterborne Monkton–Bradford Peverell–Dorchester boundary	35.3	56.8	A37 north / B3150 / Bridport Road / A352 – Yeovil, Dorchester, Sherborne, Charminster, Stratton, Martinstown	Southern terminus of A37
Dorset	Winterborne Monkton–Winterborne Herringston–Dorchester boundary	36.8	59.2	A354 south (Monkton Hill) / B3147 (Weymouth Avenue) – Weymouth, Dorchester, Upwey, Winterborne Monkton	Southern terminus of A354 concurrency
Dorset	Winterborne Came–Dorchester boundary	38.0	61.2	A352 east – Wareham, Broadmayne, West Stafford	Western terminus of A352
Dorset	Stinsford	40.6	65.3	Higher Bockhampton, Lower Bockhampton	Grade–separated junction
Dorset	Puddletown	41.9	67.4	Tolpuddle, Puddletown, Troy Town, Puddletown Forest	Grade–separated junction; Tolpuddle, Puddletown signed eastbound only, Puddletown Forest westbound only
Dorset	Puddletown	43.0– 43.3	69.2– 69.7	A354 north / B3142 – Blandford, Piddlehinton, Milborne St Andrew, Puddletown	Grade–separated junction; Milborne St Andrew signed eastbound only, Puddletown westbound only; eastern terminus of A354 concurrency
Dorset	Tolpuddle–Affpuddle and Turnerspuddle boundary	46.3– 46.6	74.5– 75.0	Warmwell, Crossways, Affpuddle, Briantspuddle, Milborne St Andrew, Tolpuddle	Grade–separated junction; Milborne St Andrew and Tolpuddle signed westbound only
Dorset	Bere Regis	47.6	76.6	Bere Regis, Milborne St Andrew	Grade–separated junction; eastbound exit and westbound entrance
Dorset	Bere Regis	48.9	78.7	A31 north-east – Wimborne, Ringwood, Blandford, Winterborne Kingston	South-western terminus of A31
Dorset	Lytchett Minster	56.2	90.4	A351 south / B3067 – Wareham, Sandford, Lytchett Minster, Swanage, Holton Heath	Swanage and Holton Heath signed westbound only; northern terminus of A351
Dorset	Upton	57.7– 58.1	92.9– 93.5	A350 north / B3068 – Blandford, Upton, Hamworthy	Grade–separated junction; western terminus of A350 concurrency
Dorset	Upton–Poole boundary	58.6– 58.8	94.3– 94.6	A350 south / Longmeadow Lane / Poole Road to A3049 – Poole, Bournemouth, Ringwood	Information signed westbound only; eastern terminus of A350 concurrency
Dorset	Poole	60.0	96.6	A349 (Waterloo Road) / Fleets Lane – Wimborne, Broadstone A3049 east to A348 – Bournemouth, Ringwood, Canford Heath, Christchurch	To A348 and Canford Heath signed eastbound only; access only to A3049 east and from A3049 west
Dorset	Poole	62.1	99.9	A350 north (Parkstone Road) – Town centre	Southern terminus of A350
Dorset	Poole	63.5	102.2	Ashley Road (A3040 north) – Upper Parkstone, Wallisdown	Wallisdown signed eastbound only; southern terminus of A3040
Dorset	Bournemouth	64.3	103.5	Seamoor Road / The Avenue / Lindsay Road – Westbourne	Western terminus of A338 concurrency; southern terminus of A338
Dorset	Bournemouth	65.6– 65.8	105.6– 105.9	A347 north – Charminster, Winton, Wimborne	Grade–separated junction; Charminster and Winton signed eastbound only; southern terminus of A347
Dorset	Bournemouth	66.2	106.5	A338 north (Wessex Way) to A31 / A35 / A3049 – Salisbury, Ringwood, Southampton, Lyndhurst, Boscombe, Christchurch, Bournemouth Airport	Eastern terminus of A338 concurrency
Dorset	Bournemouth	67.9	109.3	A3049 west (Ashley Road) to A338 – Poole, Charminster, Winton, Ringwood	Charminster and Winton signed eastbound only, Ringwood westbound only; eastern terminus of A3049
Dorset	Bournemouth	69.5	111.8	A3060 north-west / Iford Lane to A338 / A341 – Poole, Ringwood, Wimborne, Bournemouth town centre, Bournemouth Airport	South-eastern terminus of A3060
Dorset	Bournemouth–Christchurch boundary	69.6– 69.8	112.0– 112.3	Iford Bridge over River Stour	
Dorset	Christchurch	73.0	117.5	A337 east (Highcliffe Road) / B3059 (Somerford Road) – Lymington, New Milton, Highcliffe, Mudeford, Purewell, Somerford	Western terminus of A337
Hampshire	Burley	78.5	126.3	Burley	Grade–separated junction
Hampshire	Lyndhurst	85.2– 85.4	137.1– 137.4	A337 to M27 / A31 – Southampton, Ringwood, Cadnam, Lymington, Brockenhurst	Brief concurrency
Hampshire	Colbury–Totton boundary	89.2– 89.4	143.6– 143.9	A326 north to M27 / A36 – Salisbury, Ringwood, Bournemouth, Totton (central & west), Netley Marsh, Cadnam, Ower	
Hampshire	Totton	90.1	145.0	A326 south – Fawley, Marchwood, Hythe	
Hampshire	Totton	91.0	146.5	A36 north – Totton town centre	Grade–separated junction; westbound exit and eastbound entrance; southern terminus of A36
Hampshire	Southampton	91.2– 91.5	146.8– 147.3	M271 north to M27 – London, Winchester, The Midlands, The West, Portsmouth, Bournemouth	Grade–separated junction; The Midlands, Portsmouth and Bournemouth signed eastbound only, The West westbound only; western terminus of A33 concurrency; southern terminus of M271; western terminus of A33
Hampshire	Southampton	91.8– 92.0	147.7– 148.1	A33 / First Avenue / Wimpson Lane – City centre, Dock Gates 4-10, 20	A33 and City centre signed westbound only; eastern terminus of A33 concurrency
Hampshire	Southampton	92.9	149.5	A3057 (Romsey Road) – Romsey, Maybush, Lordshill, Shirley	
Hampshire	Southampton	94.1– 94.7	151.4– 152.4	A33 (The Avenue / Bassett Avenue) to M3 – City centre, London, Winchester	
Hampshire	Southampton	96.0	154.5	A335 to M27 – Eastleigh, Airport	Eastern terminus
1.000 mi = 1.609 km; 1.000 km = 0.621 mi: Concurrency terminus; Incomplete access

== Incidents ==
In May 2021, a sinkhole opened on the carriageway following emergency repairs to a pothole on the A35 Puddletown bypass near the junction for Troytown. The road was closed to allow remedial works to be carried out.

In October 2021 the edge of the eastbound carriageway collapsed into a field where the A35 ascends an escarpment 1.1 miles (1.8 km) east of Honiton. Due to the complex ground conditions repairs took 8 months to complete with temporary signals controlling single-file traffic for that time.
