= Upton =

Upton may refer to:

== Places ==
=== United Kingdom ===
==== England ====
- Upton, Slough, Berkshire (in Buckinghamshire until 1974)
- Upton, Buckinghamshire, a hamlet near Aylesbury
- Upton, Huntingdonshire, Cambridgeshire
- Upton, Peterborough, Cambridgeshire
- Upton, Halton, a location in Cheshire
- Upton-by-Chester, Cheshire
- Upton, Cornwall, Linkinhorne
- Upton, Bude–Stratton, a location in Cornwall
- Upton, Cumbria
- Upton, East Devon
- Upton, South Hams, Devon
- Upton, Torquay, Devon
- Upton Hellions, Devon
- Upton Pyne, Devon
- Upton, Dorset
- Upton, East Riding of Yorkshire, a location
- Tetbury Upton, Gloucestershire, former name Upton
- Hawkesbury Upton, Gloucestershire
- Upton Cheyney, Gloucestershire
- Upton, north Test Valley, Hampshire, a hamlet approximately 7 miles north of Andover
- Upton, south Test Valley, Hampshire, a hamlet near Southampton, towards the northern end of the M271 motorway
- Upton Grey, Hampshire, a village and civil parish near Basingstoke
- Upton, Isle of Wight, a location
- Upton, Thanet, a location in Broadstairs, Kent
- Upton, Leicestershire
- Upton, Lincolnshire
- Upton, Bexley, London
  - Upton (Bexley ward)
- Upton, Merseyside
  - Upton (Wirral ward), an electoral ward of [irral Council
- Upton, Newham, in the London Borough of Newham
  - Upton (UK Parliament constituency), a former parliamentary constituency that existed from 1918 to 1950
  - Upton (Newham ward), a former electoral ward of Newham London Borough Council that existed from 1964 to 2002
- Upton, Norfolk
- Upton Fen, Norfolk
- Upton with Fishley, a civil parish in Norfolk
- Upton, Northamptonshire
- Upton, Bassetlaw, Nottinghamshire
- Upton, Newark and Sherwood, Nottinghamshire
- Upton, Vale of White Horse, Oxfordshire (in Berkshire until 1974)
- Upton, West Oxfordshire, Oxfordshire
- Upton Magna, Shropshire
- Upton, Somerset, Somerset West and Taunton
- Upton, South Somerset, a location in Somerset
- Upton Noble, Somerset
- Upton, Warwickshire
- Upton, West Yorkshire
- Upton, Wiltshire, near East Knoyle
- Upton Lovell, Wiltshire
- Upton Scudamore, Wiltshire
- Upton upon Severn, Worcestershire

==== Wales ====
- Upton, Pembrokeshire

=== United States ===
- Upton, Indiana
- Upton, Kentucky
- Upton, Maine
- Upton, Baltimore, Maryland, a neighborhood
- Upton (Baltimore, Maryland), a historic house
- Upton, Massachusetts, a New England town
  - Upton (CDP), Massachusetts, the main village in the town
- Upton, Missouri
- Upton, New York, home of Brookhaven National Laboratory
- Upton County, Texas
- Upton, Wyoming

=== Elsewhere ===
- Upton, Cork, Ireland
- Upton, Quebec, Canada

== Other uses ==
- Upton (name), including a list of people with the name
- Upton (automobile), an American car produced 1904–1907

== See also ==
- Upton station (disambiguation)
- Upton House (disambiguation)
- Upton Park (disambiguation)
