= List of United Kingdom locations: Uppi-Uz =

The United Kingdom

This is part of the list of United Kingdom locations: a gazetteer of place names in the United Kingdom showing each place's locality and geographical coordinates.

== Up (continued) ==
=== Uppi-Upz ===
Location	Locality	Coordinates (links to map & photo sources)	OS grid reference
Uppincott	Devon	50.80°N 03.59°W	SS8802
Uppingham	Rutland	52.58°N 00.73°W	SP8699
Uppington	Dorset	50.85°N 01.98°W	SU0106
Uppington	Shropshire	52.68°N 02.59°W	SJ6009
Upsall	North Yorkshire	54.27°N 01.31°W	SE4587
Upsher Green	Suffolk	52.05°N 00.78°E	TL9143
Upshire	Essex	51.68°N 00.03°E	TL4100
Up Somborne	Hampshire	51.08°N 01.44°W	SU3932
Upstreet	Kent	51.32°N 01.18°E	TR2263
Up Sydling	Dorset	50.80°N 02.54°W	ST6201
Upthorpe	Gloucestershire	51.69°N 02.36°W	SO7500
Upthorpe	Suffolk	52.31°N 00.88°E	TL9772
Upton	Berkshire	51.50°N 00.58°W	SU9879
Upton	Bexley	51.452°N 00.127°E	TQ479747
Upton	Buckinghamshire	51.79°N 00.88°W	SP7711
Upton (Huntingdonshire)	Cambridgeshire	52.38°N 00.28°W	TL1778
Upton (Peterborough)	Cambridgeshire	52.58°N 00.37°W	TF1000
Upton (Cheshire West and Chester)	Cheshire	53.20°N 02.89°W	SJ4068
Upton (Bude-Stratton)	Cornwall	50.80°N 04.55°W	SS2004
Upton (Linkinhorne)	Cornwall	50.52°N 04.44°W	SX2772
Upton	Cumbria	54.74°N 03.05°W	NY3239
Upton (East Devon)	Devon	50.81°N 03.29°W	ST0902
Upton (South Hams)	Devon	50.27°N 03.82°W	SX7043
Upton	Dorset	50.73°N 02.02°W	SY9893
Upton	East Riding of Yorkshire	53.96°N 00.26°W	TA1454
Upton	Halton	53.37°N 02.78°W	SJ4887
Upton (south Test Valley)	Hampshire	50.95°N 01.47°W	SU3717
Upton (north Test Valley)	Hampshire	51.29°N 01.48°W	SU3655
Upton	Isle of Wight	50.70°N 01.17°W	SZ5890
Upton (Broadstairs)	Kent	51.35°N 01.41°E	TR3867
Upton	Leicestershire	52.58°N 01.47°W	SP3699
Upton	Lincolnshire	53.36°N 00.70°W	SK8686
Upton	Newham	51.53°N 00.01°E	TQ4084
Upton	Norfolk	52.65°N 01.53°E	TG3912
Upton	Northamptonshire	52.23°N 00.96°W	SP7160
Upton (Bassetlaw)	Nottinghamshire	53.27°N 00.89°W	SK7476
Upton (Newark and Sherwood)	Nottinghamshire	53.07°N 00.91°W	SK7354
Upton (Vale of White Horse)	Oxfordshire	51.57°N 01.26°W	SU5186
Upton (West Oxfordshire)	Oxfordshire	51.80°N 01.65°W	SP2412
Upton (Somerset West and Taunton)	Somerset	51.04°N 03.44°W	SS9928
Upton (South Somerset)	Somerset	51.03°N 02.78°W	ST4526
Upton	Wakefield	53.61°N 01.29°W	SE4713
Upton	Warwickshire	52.21°N 01.82°W	SP1257
Upton	Wiltshire	51.08°N 02.18°W	ST8732
Upton	Wirral	53.38°N 03.09°W	SJ2788
Upton Bishop	Herefordshire	51.94°N 02.51°W	SO6527
Upton Cheyney	South Gloucestershire	51.41°N 02.44°W	ST6969
Upton Cressett	Shropshire	52.52°N 02.51°W	SO6592
Upton Crews	Herefordshire	51.94°N 02.52°W	SO6427
Upton Cross	Cornwall	50.52°N 04.42°W	SX2872
Upton End	Bedfordshire	51.99°N 00.37°W	TL1234
Upton Field	Nottinghamshire	53.07°N 00.94°W	SK7154
Upton Green	Norfolk	52.65°N 01.53°E	TG3912
Upton Grey	Hampshire	51.22°N 01.01°W	SU6948
Upton Heath	Cheshire	53.21°N 02.88°W	SJ4169
Upton Hellions	Devon	50.81°N 03.64°W	SS8403
Upton Lovell	Wiltshire	51.15°N 02.08°W	ST9440
Upton Magna	Shropshire	52.70°N 02.66°W	SJ5512
Upton Noble	Somerset	51.14°N 02.41°W	ST7139
Upton Park	Newham	51.52°N 00.03°E	TQ4183
Upton Pyne	Devon	50.76°N 03.54°W	SX9197
Upton Rocks	Cheshire	53.37°N 02.75°W	SJ5087
Upton Scudamore	Wiltshire	51.22°N 02.20°W	ST8647
Upton Snodsbury	Worcestershire	52.18°N 02.08°W	SO9454
Upton St Leonards	Gloucestershire	51.82°N 02.20°W	SO8614
Upton-upon-Severn	Worcestershire	52.05°N 02.22°W	SO8540
Upton Warren	Worcestershire	52.30°N 02.10°W	SO9367
Upwaltham	West Sussex	50.90°N 00.66°W	SU9413
Upware	Cambridgeshire	52.30°N 00.24°E	TL5370
Upwell	Norfolk	52.59°N 00.19°E	TF4902
Upwey	Dorset	50.65°N 02.48°W	SY6684
Upwick Green	Hertfordshire	51.89°N 00.10°E	TL4524
Upwood	Cambridgeshire	52.42°N 00.16°W	TL2582

== Ur ==
Location	Locality	Coordinates (links to map & photo sources)	OS grid reference
Urafirth	Shetland Islands	60.48°N 01.45°W	HU3078
Uragaig	Argyll and Bute	56.10°N 06.21°W	NR3898
Urchfont	Wiltshire	51.31°N 01.94°W	SU0457
Urdimarsh	Herefordshire	52.12°N 02.70°W	SO5248
Ure	Shetland Islands	60.50°N 01.60°W	HU2280
Ure Bank	North Yorkshire	54.14°N 01.52°W	SE3172
Urgashay	Somerset	51.01°N 02.62°W	ST5624
Urgha	Western Isles	57.89°N 06.77°W	NG1799
Urgha Beag	Western Isles	57.90°N 06.77°W	NB1700
Urie Lingey	Shetland Islands	60.63°N 00.91°W	HU594955
Urlay Nook	Stockton-on-Tees	54.52°N 01.38°W	NZ4014
Urmston	Trafford	53.44°N 02.39°W	SJ7494
Urpeth	Durham	54.88°N 01.61°W	NZ2554
Urquhart	Moray	57.64°N 03.20°W	NJ2862
Urra	North Yorkshire	54.40°N 01.12°W	NZ5701
Urvaig	Argyll and Bute	56.55°N 06.75°W	NM079501

== Us ==
Location	Locality	Coordinates (links to map & photo sources)	OS grid reference
Ushaw Moor	Durham	54.77°N 01.65°W	NZ2242
Usk (Brynbuga)	Monmouthshire	51.69°N 02.91°W	SO3700
Usselby	Lincolnshire	53.42°N 00.36°W	TF0993
Usworth	Sunderland	54.91°N 01.53°W	NZ3058

== Ut ==
Location	Locality	Coordinates (links to map & photo sources)	OS grid reference
Utkinton	Cheshire	53.17°N 02.68°W	SJ5464
Utley	Bradford	53.87°N 01.92°W	SE0542
Uton	Devon	50.76°N 03.67°W	SX8298
Utterby	Lincolnshire	53.41°N 00.04°W	TF3093
Uttoxeter	Staffordshire	52.89°N 01.86°W	SK0933

== Uw ==
Location	Locality	Coordinates (links to map & photo sources)	OS grid reference
Uwchmynydd	Gwynedd	52.79°N 04.74°W	SH1525

== Ux ==
Location	Locality	Coordinates (links to map & photo sources)	OS grid reference
Uxbridge	Hillingdon	51.53°N 00.48°W	TQ0583
Uxbridge Moor	Hillingdon	51.53°N 00.48°W	TQ0583

== Uy ==
Location	Locality	Coordinates (links to map & photo sources)	OS grid reference
Uyea, Unst	Shetland Islands	60.67°N 00.90°W	HU599991
Uyea, Northmavine	Shetland Islands	60.61°N 01.43°W	HU310927
Uyeasound	Shetland Islands	60.68°N 00.92°W	HP5901
Uynarey	Shetland Islands	60.50°N 01.20°W	HU439808

== Uz ==
Location	Locality	Coordinates (links to map & photo sources)	OS grid reference
Uzmaston	Pembrokeshire	51.78°N 04.94°W	SM9714
