= Upton (name) =

Upton is a surname of English origin and a rarely used given name. At the time of the British Census of 1881, the frequency of the surname Upton was highest in Sussex (6.2 times the national average), followed by Oxfordshire, Leicestershire, Staffordshire, Nottinghamshire, Warwickshire, Kent, Bedfordshire and Derbyshire. The name Upton is a variation of Upperton and is derived from the Old English for Upper Ton, Upper Enclosure or Upper Field.

== Given name ==
- Upton Bell (born 1937), American sports executive, sports commentator, and talk show host
- Upton Buhrman (1818–1895), American politician from Maryland
- Upton S. Fraser (c. 1794 – 1835), American military officer
- Upton Sheredine (1740–1800), Maryland jurist
- Upton Sinclair (1878–1968), American author, journalist and political activist
- Upton Stout (born 2002), American football player

== Surname ==
- Anne Upton (1892–1970), American composer and radio writer
- Arthur Upton (disambiguation), several people of this name
- Anthony F. Upton (1929–2015), British historian
- B. J. Upton (born 1984 as Melvin Upton Jr.), American baseball player; older brother of Justin Upton
- Barry Upton (born 1954), British hit songwriter, arranger, musician and producer of pop music
- Caitlin Upton (born 1989), an American fashion model and beauty queen from South Carolina
- Charles Upton (poet), (born 1948), American poet, Sufi and metaphysician
- Charles H. Upton (1812–1877), nineteenth century Congressman from Virginia
- Charles W. Upton (born 1943), economist
- Clive Upton (born 1946), consultant, Oxford Dictionary
- Eben Upton (born 1978), British computer engineer, inventor of Raspberry Pi
- Emory Upton (1839–1881), US army general
- Frances Upton (1904–1975), American Broadway theatre actress and comedian
- Frank Upton (1934–2011), English former professional footballer and football club manager
- Fred Upton (born 1953), American politician
- Louis Upton (1886–1952), American business magnate, founders of Whirlpool Corporation
- George Upton (disambiguation), multiple people
- Gordon Upton (1920–2010), Australian diplomat
- Graham Upton, Vice-Chancellor, Oxford Brookes University
- Hamilton Upton (1912–1965), Canadian flying ace
- Harriet Taylor Upton (1853–1945), American suffragette and author
- James Upton (1888–1949) British soldier awarded the Victoria Cross
- Jason Upton (born 1973), independent Christian worship leader
- John Upton (disambiguation), multiple people
- Justin Upton (born 1987), American baseball player
- Kate Upton (born 1992), American swimsuit model
- Lawrence Upton (1949–2020), poet and artist
- Lee Upton (born 1953), American poet
- Leslie Francis Stokes Upton (1931–1980), English and Canadian historian
- Mary Upton (born 1946), Irish politician
- Molly Upton (1953–1977), American painter, sculptor, and quilter
- Pat Upton (politician) (1944–1999), Irish veterinarian and senior Labour Party politician
- Paul Upton (born 1988), professional boxer
- Richard Upton (born 1975), Australian swimmer
- Robert W. Upton (1884–1972), American Congressman
- Róisín Upton (born 1994), Ireland field hockey
- Simon Upton (born 1958), New Zealand politician
- Solomon Upton (1891–1972), English footballer
- Steve Upton (born 1946), Wishbone Ash drummer
- Sue Upton (born 1954), British comic actress and dancer
- Warren Upton (1919–2024), American World War II veteran
- William Upton (cricketer) (1804–1867), English cricketer
- William W. Upton (1817–1896), Oregon judge and U.S. Treasury comptroller
- Winslow Upton (1853–1914), American astronomer

=== Fictional characters ===
- Dean Upton, from the British soap opera Coronation Street
