= Speaking of Jane Roberts =

- Cover of Speaking of Jane Roberts
- Author: Susan M. Watkins
- Language: English
- Genre: Biography
- Publisher: Moment Point Press, Inc.
- Publication date: August 21, 2006
- Publication place: United States
- Pages: 240
- ISBN: 978-0-9661327-7-9

Speaking of Jane Roberts is a biography of author Jane Roberts written by Susan M. Watkins. It was published on August 21, 2006. Roberts is known for such works as the Seth Material and The Oversoul Seven Trilogy.
