= Charles Upton =

Charles Upton may refer to:

- Charles W. Upton (born c. 1943), American economist
- Charles H. Upton (1812–1877), politician and statesman from Massachusetts and Virginia
- Charles Upton (poet) (born 1948), American poet, Sufi and metaphysician
- Charles L. Upton (1870–1936), American physician and college football coach
- Charles Upton Lowe (1921–2012), for whom Oculocerebrorenal syndrome or Lowe syndrome was named
- Charles Upton, High Sheriff of Derbyshire in 1809
