= Bibliography of Jane Roberts =

== Complete writings of American author Jane Roberts ==
Books by Publication Date

- (1963) The Rebellers. Publisher: Ace Books, Inc. (Published as a Dual Mass Market Paperback Book with Listen! The Stars! by John Brunner) ISBN: None
- (1966). How To Develop Your ESP Power. Publisher: Federick Fell. (Later retitled and reprinted as The Coming of Seth.) ISBN 0-8119-0379-6.
- (1970). The Seth Material. Reprinted, 2001 by New Awareness Network. ISBN 978-0-9711198-0-2 . (A SETH BOOK) NB: The Seth Material is a summary and discussion of The Early Sessions material
- (1972). Seth Speaks: The Eternal Validity of the Soul. Reprinted 1994 by Amber-Allen Publishing. ISBN 1-878424-07-6. (A SETH BOOK)
- (1974). The Nature of Personal Reality. Prentice-Hall. Reprinted 1994, Amber-Allen Publishing. ISBN 1-878424-06-8. (A SETH BOOK)
- (1975). Adventures in Consciousness: An Introduction to Aspect Psychology. Prentice-Hall. ISBN 0-13-013953-X.
- (1975). Dialogues of the Soul and Mortal Self in Time. Prentice-Hall. ISBN 0-13-208538-0. Poetry.
- (1976). Psychic Politics: An Aspect Psychology Book. Prentice-Hall. ISBN 0-13-731752-2.
- (1977). The "Unknown" Reality Vol. 1. Prentice-Hall. Reprinted 1997, Amber-Allen Publishing. ISBN 1-878424-25-4. (A SETH BOOK)
- (1979). The "Unknown" Reality Vol. 2. Prentice-Hall. Reprinted 1997, Amber-Allen Publishing. ISBN 1-878424-26-2 . (A SETH BOOK)
- (1977). The World View of Paul Cézanne: A Psychic Interpretation. Prentice-Hall. ISBN 0-13-968859-5.
- (1978). The Afterdeath Journal of An American Philosopher: The World View of William James. Prentice-Hall. ISBN 0-13-018515-9.
- (1979). Emir's Education in the Proper Use of Magical Powers. Prentice-Hall. ISBN 1-57174-142-9. Children's literature.
- (1979). The Nature of the Psyche: Its Human Expression. Prentice-Hall. Reprinted 1996, Amber-Allen Publishing. ISBN 1-878424-22-X. (A SETH BOOK)
- (1981). The Individual and the Nature of Mass Events. Prentice-Hall, ISBN 0-13-457259-9. Reprinted 1994, Amber-Allen Publishing, ISBN 1-878424-21-1. (A SETH BOOK)
- (1995). The Oversoul Seven Trilogy. Amber-Allen Publishing. ISBN 1-878424-17-3. Edition: Paperback; May 1, 1995 (originally published as three separate books: The Education of Oversoul 7 (1973); The Further Education of Oversoul Seven (1979); Oversoul Seven and the Museum of Time (1984)).
- (1981). The God of Jane: A Psychic Manifesto. Prentice-Hall. ISBN 0-01-335749-2. Reprinted 2000, Moment Point Press. ISBN 0-9661327-5-0.
- (1982). If We Live Again, Or, Public Magic and Private Love. Prentice-Hall. ISBN 0-13-450619-7. Poetry.
- (1986). Dreams, Evolution and Value Fulfillment. Prentice-Hall, two volumes, ISBN 0-13-219452-X and ISBN 0-13-219460-0. (A SETH BOOK)
- (1986). Seth, Dreams and Projections of Consciousness. Stillpoint Publishing.
- (1993). A Seth Reader. Vernal Equinox Press. Compendium edited by Richard Roberts. ISBN 0-942380-15-0.
- (1995). The Magical Approach: Seth Speaks About the Art of Creative Living. Amber-Allen Publishing. ISBN 1-878424-09-2. (A SETH BOOK)
- (1997). The Way Toward Health. Robert F. Butts (Foreword), Amber-Allen Publishing. ISBN 1-878424-30-0. (A SETH BOOK)
- (2006). The World View of Rembrandt. New Awareness Network. ISBN 0-9768978-2-2.
- (1997 and after). The Early Sessions (Sessions 1 through 510 of the Seth Material). New Awareness Network. Edited by Robert Butts. Nine volumes. ISBN 0-9652855-0-2. (A SETH BOOK)
- (2003). The Personal Sessions. New Awareness Network. Deleted session material. Seven volumes. ISBN 0-9711198-4-8. (A SETH BOOK)
- (2008) The Early Class Sessions. New Awareness Network. Four volumes. (A SETH BOOK)

Seth Books Only (by date channeled)

- (Channeled 1963-1970) (Published 1997 and after). The Early Sessions (Sessions 1 through 510 of the Seth Material). New Awareness Network. Edited by Robert Butts. Nine volumes. ISBN 0-9652855-0-2. (A SETH BOOK)
- (Channeled 1965-1984) (Published 2003). The Personal Sessions. New Awareness Network. Deleted session material. Seven volumes. ISBN 0-9711198-4-8. (A SETH BOOK)
- (Channeled 1967-1972) (Published 2008) The Early Class Sessions. New Awareness Network. Four volumes. (A SETH BOOK)
- (Channeled 1963-1970) (Published 1970). The Seth Material. Reprinted, 2001 by New Awareness Network. ISBN 978-0-9711198-0-2 . (A SETH BOOK) NB: The Seth Material is a summary and discussion of The Early Sessions material
- (Channeled 1970-1971) (Published 1972). Seth Speaks: The Eternal Validity of the Soul. Reprinted 1994 by Amber-Allen Publishing. ISBN 1-878424-07-6. (A SETH BOOK)
- (Channeled 1972-1973) (Published 1974). The Nature of Personal Reality. Prentice-Hall. Reprinted 1994, Amber-Allen Publishing. ISBN 1-878424-06-8. (A SETH BOOK)
- (Channeled 1974) (Published 1977). The "Unknown" Reality Vol. 1. Prentice-Hall. Reprinted 1997, Amber-Allen Publishing. ISBN 1-878424-25-4. (A SETH BOOK)
- (Channeled 1974-1975) (Published 1979). The "Unknown" Reality Vol. 2. Prentice-Hall. Reprinted 1997, Amber-Allen Publishing. ISBN 1-878424-26-2 . (A SETH BOOK)
- (Channeled 1975-1977) (Published 1979). The Nature of the Psyche: Its Human Expression. Prentice-Hall. Reprinted 1996, Amber-Allen Publishing. ISBN 1-878424-22-X. (A SETH BOOK)
- (Channeled 1977-1979) (Published 1981). The Individual and the Nature of Mass Events. Prentice-Hall, ISBN 0-13-457259-9. Reprinted 1994, Amber-Allen Publishing, ISBN 1-878424-21-1. (A SETH BOOK)
- (Channeled 1980) (Published 1995). The Magical Approach : Seth Speaks About the Art of Creative Living. Amber-Allen Publishing. ISBN 1-878424-09-2. (A SETH BOOK)
- (Channeled 1982) (Published 1986). Dreams, Evolution and Value Fulfillment. Prentice-Hall, two volumes, ISBN 0-13-219452-X and ISBN 0-13-219460-0. (A SETH BOOK)
- (Channeled 1984) (Published 1997). The Way Toward Health. Robert F. Butts (Foreword), Amber-Allen Publishing. ISBN 1-878424-30-0. (A SETH BOOK)

Short Stories and Novellas

- "Prayer of a Wiser People" in Profile, 1950.
- "The Red Wagon" in Magazine of Fantasy and Science Fiction, December 1956 (reprinted in Reality Change: the Global Seth Journal, 1993; anthologized in Ladies of Fantasy, 1975).
- "The Canvas Pyramid" in Magazine of Fantasy and Science Fiction, March 1957 (French edition, 1958).
- "First Communion" in Fantastic Universe, March 1957.
- "The Chestnut Beads" in Magazine of Fantasy and Science Fiction, October 1957 (French edition, 1958; anthologized in Triple W: Witches, Warlocks and Werewolves, 1963).
- "The Bundu" (novella) in Magazine of Fantasy and Science Fiction, March 1958.
- "A Demon at Devotions" in Magazine of Fantasy and Science Fiction, September 1958 (reprinted in Reality Change: the Global Seth Journal, Winter 1994).
- "Nightmare" in Magazine of Fantasy and Science Fiction, April 1959.
- "Impasse" in Magazine of Fantasy and Science Fiction, July 1959 (Spanish anthology edition ca. 1960).
- "Three Times Around" in Magazine of Fantasy and Science Fiction, 1964 (anthologized in Earth Invaded, 1982).
- "The Big Freeze" in Dude, 1965 (reprinted in Reality Change: the Global Seth Journal, Summer 1994).
- "The Mission," purchased by Topper magazine in August, 1965. (Publication not yet confirmed.)

Poems

- “Time” in The Saratogian [Saratoga Springs, NY], 1947 Mar 19.
- “Enigma” in The Saratogian, 1947 Mar 19.
- “Spring Gaiety” in The Saratogian, 1947 Apr 26.
- “Rain” in Profile [Skidmore College literary magazine], December, 1947.
- “Pretense” in Profile, December, 1947.
- “Code” in Profile, December, 1947.
- “Skyscrapers” in Profile, December, 1947.
- “Introvert” in Profile, May, 1948.
- “Poem” in Profile, May, 1948.
- “How Public Like a Frog” in Profile, Fall, 1948.
- “Motorcycle Ride” in Profile, Fall, 1948.
- “Echo” in Profile, May, 1949.
- “Death Stood at the Door” in Profile, May, 1949.
- “Compromise” in Profile, May, 1949.
- "I Shall Die in the Springtime." Patterns. v.1, n.1, October 1954.
- "Lyric" Patterns. v.1, n.1, October 1954.
- "Matilda" in Quicksilver, Spring, 1960.
- "It is Springtime, Grandfather." Epos., v.12, n.3, Spring 1961.
- "The Familiar." Bitterroot. v.1, n.2, Winter 1962.
- "I Saw a Hand" in Treasures of Parnassus: Best Poems of 1962, Young Publications, 1962 (reprinted in The Elmira Star-Gazette, 1962).
- "My Grandfather's World." Epos. v.14, n.3, Spring 1963.
- "Lullaby." Epos. v.14, n.3, Spring 1963.
- "Beware, October." Epos. v.16, n.1, Fall 1964.
- "This Wrist, This Hand." Epos. v.16, n.4, Summer 1965.
- "The Game." New Lantern Club Review. n.2, Summer 1965.
- "The Flowers." Steppenwolf. n.1, Winter 1965-1966.
- "Vision." Dust/9. v.3, n.1, Fall 1966.
- "Who Whispers Yes." Dust/12. v.3, n.4, Spring 1969.
- "Hi, Low, and Psycho." Excerpts published in Reality Change, Third Quarter, 1996.
