= Oversoul =

Oversoul may refer to:

== Philosophy and religion ==
- "The Over-Soul", an 1841 essay by Ralph Waldo Emerson
- A translation of the Hindu term Paramatman

== Arts and entertainment ==
- Over Soul (song), a 2001 single by Megumi Hayashibara
- Artificial oversoul, a fictional element in the novel The Wheels of Chance
- Oversoul, a fictional element in the novel series The Malloreon
- Oversoul, a fictional character in the novel series Homecoming Saga
- Oversoul, a term used in the novel The Oversoul Seven Trilogy
- Oversoul, a fictional element in the video game Achaea, Dreams of Divine Lands
- Over Soul, a fictional element in the manga series Shaman King
- Oversoul, a 1999 painting by Alex Grey
- OverSoul, a 2012 video game by Artix Entertainment
