= Jane Roberts =

American poet and psychic (1929–1984)

- Jane Roberts
- Born: Dorothy Jane Roberts; May 8, 1929; Albany, New York, US
- Died: September 5, 1984 (aged 55); Elmira, New York, US
- Education: Skidmore College
- Occupation: Author
- Writing career
- Genre: Paranormal
- Notable works: The Seth Material, The Oversoul Seven Trilogy
- Movement: New Age

Dorothy Jane Roberts (May 8, 1929 – September 5, 1984) was an American author and poet, who claimed to be psychic and a spirit medium channeling a personality who called himself "Seth." Her publication of the Seth texts, known as the Seth Material, established her as one of the preeminent figures in the world of paranormal phenomena.

== Early life and career ==
Roberts was born in Albany, New York, and grew up in nearby Saratoga Springs, New York. Her parents, Delmer Hubbell Roberts and Marie Burdo, divorced when she was two years old. With her only child, the young Marie then returned to her own parents, and the home that the family had rented for a number of years: half of a double dwelling in a poor neighborhood. Marie had begun experiencing the early stages of rheumatoid arthritis by 1932 but worked as much as possible. Eventually, Roberts' grandfather, Joseph Burdo, with whom she shared a deep mystical identification, was unable to support two extra people, and the family had to rely upon public assistance. Roberts' grandmother was killed in an automobile accident in 1936.

The next year, her grandfather moved out of the house. By then Marie was partially incapacitated, and the Welfare Department began to furnish mother and daughter with occasional and often unreliable domestic help. When Marie became a bedridden invalid, it was Jane's responsibility to take care of her. This included cooking, cleaning, bringing her the bedpan, and getting up in the middle of the night to refuel the stove. Her embittered mother would tell Jane she was going to turn on the gas jets in the middle of the night and kill them both. When her mother attempted suicide for about the fifth time, she took sleeping pills and was in the hospital. Jane wrote that she went to the welfare worker and said, 'I can't take it anymore. I've just got to leave.'" Over and over Marie told Jane she was no good, that the daughter's birth had caused the mother's illness, and that she was disowned and considered no longer her daughter.

Well before she was 10 years old Jane had developed persistent symptoms of colitis. By her early teens, she had an overactive thyroid gland. Her vision was poor; she required very strong glasses (which she seldom wore). For most of 1940 and half of 1941, Jane was in a strictly-run Catholic orphanage in Troy, New York while her mother was hospitalized in another city for treatment of her arthritis. Priests came to the house regularly and support was offered to the fatherless family. Jane's initial bonding to the cultural beliefs of religion was very strong to make up for the lack of a loving, nurturing family. For a time she was left between belief systems.

In the summer of 1945, when she was 16 years old, Jane began working at a variety store. It was her first job. That fall she continued on the job after school hours and on an occasional Saturday. After attending public schools she went to Skidmore College from 1947 to 1950 on a poetry scholarship. Roberts' grandfather died when she was age 19. It was a time of severe shock for her. She began to substitute scientific world view for religious belief.

At that time Jane was dating Walt Zeh, a long-time Saratoga Springs friend. Together they went to the west coast by motorcycle to see Jane's father who had also come from a broken home. Jane then married Walt and continued to write while taking a variety of other jobs, including society editor for the Saratoga newspaper, and as a supervisor in a radio factory. Walt and Jane lived together for three years. It was then in February 1954 while "cutting up, dancing, and raisin' hell at a party," that Jane first met the former commercial artist Robert Fabian Butts, Jr. The fourth time they met at another party and Jane "just looked at him and said, 'Look, I'm leaving Walt, and I'm going to live by myself or I'm going to live with you, so just let me know.'" Eventually the two left town together and Jane filed for divorce. Jane and Rob married on December 27, 1954, at the home of his parents in Sayre, Pennsylvania.

Roberts wrote in a variety of genres: poetry, short stories, children's literature, nonfiction, science fiction and fantasy, and novels. She was the only woman invited to the first science-fiction writer's conference in 1956 in Milford, Pennsylvania.

The couple moved to Elmira, New York, in 1960, to find steady part-time work – Rob in the local greeting card company, Jane in an art gallery. Now in her 30s, she and her husband began to record what she said were messages from a personality named "Seth," and she wrote several books about the experience.

== Seth Material ==
On a September evening in 1963, Roberts sat down at her table to work on poetry; Butts was in his back-room studio, painting. "It was very domestic, very normal, very unpsychedelic," she would later remember. And then "Between one normal minute and the next, a fantastic avalanche of radical, new ideas burst into my head with tremendous force ... It was as if the physical world were really tissue-paper-thin, hiding infinite dimensions of reality, and I was flung through the tissue paper with a huge ripping sound." When she "came to," Roberts found herself scrawling the title of this batch of notes: The Physical Universe as Idea Construction.

Before this, though her fiction typically dealt with such themes as clairvoyance and reincarnation, intellectually neither she nor Butts believed in extrasensory abilities. Yet soon after this episode, Roberts suddenly began recalling her dreams, including two that were precognitive. Their curiosity piqued, the couple decided to investigate further, and she managed to land a contract with a New York publisher for a do-it-yourself book on extra-sensory perception.

In late 1963, Roberts and Butts started experimenting with a Ouija board as part of Roberts' research for the book. According to Roberts and Butts, on December 2, 1963, they began to receive coherent messages from a male personality who eventually identified himself as Seth. Soon after, Roberts reported that she was hearing the messages in her head. The first seven sessions were entirely with the Ouija board. The three-hour session on the evening of January 2, 1964, was the first where she began to dictate the messages instead of using the Ouija board. For a while, she still opened her sessions with the board, but finally abandoned it after the 27th session on Feb. 19, 1964.

Roberts described the process of writing the Seth books as entering a trance state. She said Seth would assume control of her body and speak through her, while her husband wrote down the words she spoke. They referred to such episodes as "readings" or "sessions." The 26th session on Feb. 18, 1964, was the first held in the presence of another person—a friend.

On January 17, 1964, Roberts channeled an allegedly recently deceased woman who told Butts that his and his wife's work with Seth was a life-time project, that they would publish his manuscripts, and help spread his ideas. At the 27th session Seth also told the couple how to rearrange the furniture in their apartment which would better suit their energies. Despite feelings of disbelief toward both messages, the couple somewhat reluctantly agreed. Two days afterward they heard from a psychologist interested in reincarnation to whom they had written three weeks earlier with some session copies enclosed. The psychologist told them that the very fluency of the material suggested that it might come from Roberts' subconscious, though it was impossible to tell. He also cautioned that in some circumstances, amateur mediumship could lead to mental problems.

The letter upset her but helped her deal with her doubts. She felt there were no "alarming changes" in her personality. "I was doing twice the creative work I had done earlier. I was satisfied with the quality of the Seth Material; it was far superior to anything I could do on my own. If nothing else, I thought the sessions presented a way of making deeply unconscious knowledge available on a consistent basis." "Because we were so innocent about psychic literature, we weren't hampered by superstitious fears about such [psychic] phenomena. I didn't believe in gods or demons, so I didn't fear them. I wanted to learn. Rob and I had discovered a whole new world together, and we were going to explore it."

Roberts assumed Seth was a subconscious fantasy, personified because she did not believe in spirits or life after death. She monitored her personality characteristics and went to a psychologist. But she felt that "Seth seemed far more mature and well-balanced than the psychologist, so finally I stopped worrying. This is not to say the experience did not cause certain strains and stresses that could accompany any worthwhile venture in an entirely new field."

Roberts also purportedly channeled the world views of several other people, including the philosopher William James, Rembrandt, and the Impressionist painter Paul Cézanne, through a process she described as using a typewriter to write "automatically."

For 21 years until Roberts' death in 1984 (with a one-year hiatus due to her final illness), Roberts held more than 1500 regular or private "ESP class" trance sessions in which she spoke on behalf of Seth. Butts served as the stenographer, taking the messages down in shorthand he had made up, having others on occasion make recording of some sessions. The messages from Seth channeled through Roberts consisted mostly of monologues on a wide variety of topics. They were published by Prentice-Hall under the collective title Seth Material.

Over the years, hundreds of people witnessed Roberts channeling "Seth". Some went to the ESP classes Roberts held (Tuesday and some Thursday nights, Sept. 1967 – Feb. 1975) for an evening, others attended for longer periods. (By this time Jane had given up her gallery work, and was teaching nursery school during part of this time.) Outside of the ESP class structure, Roberts gave many personal Seth sessions to various individuals who had written her, asking for help. She never charged for those sessions; however, at some point, she did charge $2.50 to $3.50 per ESP class of 5 to 40 people. When the books began to sell in sufficient numbers, she dropped that fee. Book sessions were almost always private, held on Monday and Wednesday evenings without witnesses from 1967 through 1982 (except for Tues and Thurs from Aug. to Nov. 1981).

The material through 1969 was published in summary form in The Seth Material, written by Roberts from the output of the channeling sessions. Beginning in January 1970, Roberts wrote books which she described as dictated by Seth. Roberts claimed no authorship of these books beyond her role as a medium. This series of "Seth books" totaled ten volumes. The last two books appear to be incomplete due to Roberts' illness. Butts contributed extensive footnotes, appendices, and other comments to all the Seth books, and thus was a co-author on all of them. These additions describe what was going on in Roberts' and his life at the time of the various sessions, annotated in light of contemporary beliefs and materials he and Roberts were reading, described excerpts from some fan mail and letters from professionals commenting on Seth's material about their fields, and, especially later, provided insight as to the many steps of production of multiple books with the publisher. By February 1982 they were still receiving "from 30 to 50 letters and packages a week" from readers of their various books.

Some of Roberts' earlier and later poetry was occasionally included to show how she had touched upon some of Seth's concepts. Roberts also wrote The Oversoul Seven trilogy to explore via fiction some of Seth's teachings on the concepts of reincarnation and oversouls.

According to Roberts, Seth described himself as an "energy personality essence no longer focused in physical matter," and was independent of Roberts' subconscious. Roberts initially expressed skepticism as to Seth's origins, wondering if he was a part of her own personality. While speaking as Seth, Roberts at times appeared stern, jovial, or professorial. "His" voice was deeper and more masculine sounding than Jane's and was possessed of a distinct, although not identifiable, accent. Her housecats notice the change. Unlike the psychic Edgar Cayce, whose syntax when speaking in trance was antiquated and convoluted, Roberts' syntax and sentence structures were modern and clear when speaking as Seth. Later books continued to develop but did not contradict the material introduced in earlier works. Some "Practice Elements" were even included on how a few of the concepts could be practically experienced.

A few contemporary world events were commented upon, such as the Jonestown Guyana deaths and the Three Mile Island accident.

Seth also provided an alternative creation myth to that of the Big Bang or Intelligent Design.

== Death and health issues ==
Roberts' father died in November 1971 at the age of 68; her mother died six months later at the same age. In early 1982 Roberts spent a month in the hospital for severely underactive thyroid gland, protruding eyes and double vision, an almost total hearing loss, a slight anemia, budding bedsores, and a hospital-caused staph infection. She recovered to an extent, but died two and a half years later in 1984, having been bedridden with severe arthritis, like her mother, for the final year and a half of her life. Roberts had spent 504 consecutive days in a hospital in Elmira, New York. The immediate causes of her death were a combination of protein depletion, osteomyelitis, and soft-tissue infections. These conditions arose out of her longstanding rheumatoid arthritis. (Butts believed for some 15 years that in Roberts' case, at least, the young girl's psychological conditioning was far more important—far more damaging, in those terms—than any physical tendency to inherit the disease.) Roberts was cremated the next day in a process she and Butts had agreed upon several years earlier.

== Fate of her recordings and manuscripts ==
After Roberts' death, recorded in The Way Toward Health (1997), Butts continued his work as a guardian of the Seth texts and continued to supervise the publication of some of the remaining material, including The Early Sessions, making sure all of the recordings, manuscripts, notes, and drawings would be given to the Yale Library. Butts remarried, and his second wife, Laurel Lee Davies, supported his work during the more than 20 years they were together and helped answer mail and proofread manuscripts. Butts died of cancer on May 26, 2008. Jane Roberts Butts and Robert F. Butts Jr., are interred together in the Wayne County, New York, Furnaceville cemetery; however, there is another gravestone with their names on it in the Sunnyside cemetery in Tunkhannock, Pennsylvania. A number of groups have compiled anthologies of quotes from Seth, summarized sections of his teachings, issued copies of Seth sessions on audio tape, and further relayed the material via classes and conventions.

== Reception and influence ==
Seth's effect upon New Age thinkers has been profound. The title jacket of The Nature of Personal Reality, A Seth Book, republished in 1994 (Amber-Allen/New World Library), contains testimonials from some of the most notable thinkers and writers within the movement. Marianne Williamson, Deepak Chopra, Shakti Gawain, Dan Millman, Jim Henson, Louise Hay, Richard Bach, and others express the effect the Seth Material had upon their own awakening. In words similar to Williamson's they state: "Seth was one of my first metaphysical teachers. He remains a constant source of knowledge and inspiration in my life." Catherine L. Albanese, professor of religious history at the University of Chicago, stated that in the 1970s the Seth Material "launched an era of nationwide awareness" of the channeling trend. She believes it contributed to the "self-identity of an emergent New Age movement and also augment[ed] its ranks."

John P. Newport, in his study of the impact of New Age beliefs on contemporary culture, described the central focus of the Seth material as the idea that for each individual: "you create your own reality." (Briefly summarized, our beliefs generate emotions that trigger our memories and organize our associations. Eventually, those beliefs become manifested in our physical lives and health.) Newport wrote that this foundational concept of the New Age movement was first developed in the "Seth Material." Historian Robert C. Fuller, a professor of religious studies at Bradley University, wrote that Seth filled the role of guide for what Fuller called "unchurched American spirituality," related to concepts of reincarnation, karma, free will, ancient metaphysical wisdom, and "Christ consciousness."

Some writers noted, "Husband Robert Butts stated that similarities exist between Seth's ideas and those of various religious, philosophical, and mystical doctrines from the Near, Middle, or Far East... and we've done a little reading on Buddhism, Hinduism, Zen, and Taoism, for example, not to mention subjects like shamanism, voodooism, and obeah."

New Age writer Michael Talbot wrote, "To my great surprise—and slight annoyance—I found that Seth eloquently and lucidly articulated a view of reality that I had arrived at only after great effort and an extensive study of both paranormal phenomena and quantum physics."

The Yale University Library Manuscripts and Archives maintains a collection entitled Jane Roberts Papers (MS 1090), which documents the career and personal life of Jane Roberts, including journals, poetry, correspondence, audio, and video recordings, and other materials donated after her death by Roberts' husband and other individuals and organizations. Yale University's collection entitled "Jane Roberts papers" occupies 164.08 linear feet of shelf space and is contained in 498 boxes.

=== Quotes ===
Jane Roberts's corpus advocates panpsychism and reality creation outside corporeal time. She advises scientists to look beyond evolution with the ideal "the cells precognate," and she asks troubled people to cure themselves by believing that "the point of power is in the present" and "beliefs create reality." In the late 1970s, when scientists considered viruses inert pests and un-life, Seth declared that "viruses are necessary for life as we know it."

=== Criticism ===
Roberts and the Seth Material have attracted critiques from outside the paranormal community. The poet Charles Upton, in his collection of essays titled The System of Antichrist, posited that Roberts multiplied the self due to a fear of death. His opinion was that the Seth texts are based on a misunderstanding of both Christianity and of Eastern religions.

Professor of psychology and noted critic of parapsychology James E. Alcock opined, "In light of all this, the Seth materials must surely be viewed as less than ordinary. There certainly was the time and talent for fraud to play a role, but we cannot discriminate between that possibility and the possibility of unconscious production—at any rate, given these circumstances, there seems little need to consider the involvement of any supernatural agency."

Some religious groups have warned their members about the dangers and deceptions of reading channeled messages from Roberts and others. John MacArthur, host of a syndicated Christian talk show, considers The Seth Material to be "a book entirely written by a demon.", while the New Age Urantia Foundation considers the book evidence for "Devil possession." Videos such as Jane Roberts' Seth Speaks is Anti-Catholic Hate Books – Allowed By The Media claimed that Seth was "a demon from hell contacted through a ouija board."

Science writer Karen Stollznow has written that much of Roberts work was "criticized for being a rip-off of Christian and Eastern philosophy. It comes as no surprise that Seth influenced such authors as Deepak Chopra and Louise Hay."

Since Roberts' death, others have claimed to channel Seth. In the introduction to Seth's first dictated book, Seth Speaks, "he" says, "communications will come exclusively through Ruburt [Seth's name for Jane] at all times, to protect the integrity of the material." In The Seth Material, Jane Roberts wrote: "Several people have told me that Seth communicated with them through automatic writing, but Seth denies any such contacts." At least one person has claimed more recently to channel Roberts.

== Complete writings ==
Books:

- Roberts, Jane (1966). How To Develop Your ESP Power. Publisher: Federick Fell. (Later retitled and reprinted as The Coming of Seth.) ISBN 0-8119-0379-6.
- Roberts, Jane (1970). The Seth Material. Reprinted, 2001 by New Awareness Network. ISBN 978-0-9711198-0-2 .
- Roberts, Jane (1972). Seth Speaks: The Eternal Validity of the Soul. Reprinted 1994 by Amber-Allen Publishing. ISBN 1-878424-07-6.
- Roberts, Jane (1974). The Nature of Personal Reality. Prentice-Hall. Reprinted 1994, Amber-Allen Publishing. ISBN 1-878424-06-8.
- Roberts, Jane (1975). Adventures in Consciousness: An Introduction to Aspect Psychology. Prentice-Hall. ISBN 0-13-013953-X.
- Roberts, Jane (1975). Dialogues of the Soul and Mortal Self in Time. Prentice-Hall. ISBN 0-13-208538-0. Poetry.
- Roberts, Jane (1976). Psychic Politics: An Aspect Psychology Book. Prentice-Hall. ISBN 0-13-731752-2.
- Roberts, Jane (1977). The "Unknown" Reality Vol. 1. Prentice-Hall. Reprinted 1997, Amber-Allen Publishing. ISBN 1-878424-25-4.
- Roberts, Jane (1979). The "Unknown" Reality Vol. 2. Prentice-Hall. Reprinted 1997, Amber-Allen Publishing. ISBN 1-878424-26-2 .
- Roberts, Jane (1977). The World View of Paul Cézanne: A Psychic Interpretation. Prentice-Hall. ISBN 0-13-968859-5.
- Roberts, Jane (1978). The Afterdeath Journal of An American Philosopher: The World View of William James. Prentice-Hall. ISBN 0-13-018515-9.
- Roberts, Jane (1979). Emir's Education in the Proper Use of Magical Powers. Prentice-Hall. ISBN 1-57174-142-9. Children's literature.
- Roberts, Jane (1979). The Nature of the Psyche: Its Human Expression. Prentice-Hall. Reprinted 1996, Amber-Allen Publishing. ISBN 1-878424-22-X .
- Roberts, Jane (1981). The Individual and the Nature of Mass Events. Prentice-Hall, ISBN 0134572599. Reprinted 1994, Amber-Allen Publishing, ISBN 1-878424-21-1.
- Roberts, Jane (1995). The Oversoul Seven Trilogy. Amber-Allen Publishing. ISBN 1-878424-17-3. Edition: Paperback; May 1, 1995 (originally published as three separate books: The Education of Oversoul 7 (1973); The Further Education of Oversoul Seven (1979); Oversoul Seven and the Museum of Time (1984)).
- Roberts, Jane (1981). The God of Jane: A Psychic Manifesto. Prentice-Hall. ISBN 0-01-335749-2. Reprinted 2000, Moment Point Press. ISBN 0-9661327-5-0.
- Roberts, Jane (1982). If We Live Again, Or, Public Magic and Private Love. Prentice-Hall. ISBN 0-13-450619-7. Poetry.
- Roberts, Jane (1986). Dreams, Evolution and Value Fulfillment. Prentice-Hall, two volumes, ISBN 0-13-219452-X and ISBN 0-13-219460-0.
- Roberts, Jane (1986). Seth, Dreams and Projections of Consciousness. Stillpoint Publishing.
- (1993). A Seth Reader. Vernal Equinox Press. Compendium edited by Richard Roberts. ISBN 0-942380-15-0.
- Roberts, Jane (1995). The Magical Approach : Seth Speaks About the Art of Creative Living. Amber-Allen Publishing. ISBN 1-878424-09-2.
- Roberts, Jane (1997). The Way Toward Health. Robert F. Butts (Foreword), Amber-Allen Publishing. ISBN 1-878424-30-0.
- Roberts, Jane (2006). The World View of Rembrandt. New Awareness Network. ISBN 0-9768978-2-2.
- Roberts, Jane (1997 and after). The Early Sessions (Sessions 1 through 510 of the Seth Material). New Awareness Network. Edited by Robert Butts. Nine volumes. ISBN 0-9652855-0-2.
- Roberts, Jane (2003). The Personal Sessions. New Awareness Network. Deleted session material. Seven volumes. ISBN 0-9711198-4-8.
- Roberts. Jane. The Early Class Sessions. New Awareness Network. Four volumes.

Short Stories and novellas:

- Roberts, Jane. "Prayer of a Wiser People" in Profile, 1950.
- Roberts, Jane. "The Red Wagon" in The Magazine of Fantasy and Science Fiction, 1956 (republished 1993, Reality Change Magazine; anthologized in 1975, Ladies of Fantasy).
- Roberts, Jane. "The Canvas Pyramid" in The Magazine of Fantasy and Science Fiction, 1957 (French edition, 1958).
- Roberts, Jane. "First Communion" in Fantastic Universe, 1957.
- Roberts, Jane. "The Chestnut Beads" in The Magazine of Fantasy and Science Fiction, 1957 (French edition, 1958; anthologized in Triple W: Witches, Warlocks and Werewolves, 1963).
- Roberts, Jane. "The Bundu" (novella, sequel to "The Chestnut Beads") in The Magazine of Fantasy and Science Fiction, 1958.
- Roberts, Jane. "A Demon at Devotions" in The Magazine of Fantasy and Science Fiction, 1958 (reprinted in Reality Change Magazine, Winter 1994).
- Roberts, Jane. "Nightmare" in The Magazine of Fantasy and Science Fiction, 1959.
- Roberts, Jane. "Impasse" in The Magazine of Fantasy and Science Fiction, 1959 (Spanish anthology edition ca. 1960).
- Roberts, Jane. "Three Times Around" in the Magazine of Fantasy and Science Fiction, 1964 (anthologized in Earth Invaded, 1982).
- Roberts, Jane. "The Big Freeze" in Dude, 1965 (reprinted in Reality Change Magazine, Summer 1994).
- Roberts, Jane. "The Mission," purchased by Topper magazine in August 1965. (Publication not yet confirmed.)

Poetry Submissions:

- "Time" in The Saratogian [Saratoga Springs, NY], 1947 Mar 19.
- "Enigma" in The Saratogian, 1947 Mar 19.
- "Spring Gaiety" in The Saratogian, 1947 Apr 26.
- "Rain" in Profile [Skidmore College literary magazine], December, 1947.
- "Pretense" in Profile, December, 1947.
- "Code" in Profile, December, 1947.
- "Skyscrapers" in Profile, December, 1947.
- "Introvert" in Profile, May, 1948.
- "Poem" in Profile, May, 1948.
- "How Public Like a Frog" in Profile, Fall, 1948.
- "Motorcycle Ride" in Profile, Fall, 1948.
- "Echo" in Profile, May, 1949.
- "Death Stood at the Door" in Profile, May, 1949.
- "Compromise" in Profile, May, 1949.
- "I Shall Die in the Springtime." Patterns. v.1, n.1, October 1954.
- "Lyric" Patterns. v.1, n.1, October 1954.
- "Matilda" in Quicksilver, Spring, 1960.
- "It is Springtime, Grandfather." Epos., v.12, n.3, Spring 1961.
- "The Familiar." Bitterroot. v.1, n.2, Winter 1962.
- "I Saw a Hand" in Treasures of Parnassus: Best Poems of 1962, Young Publications, 1962 (reprinted in The Elmira Star-Gazette, 1962).
- "My Grandfather's World." Epos. v.14, n.3, Spring 1963.
- "Lullaby." Epos. v.14, n.3, Spring 1963.
- "Beware, October." Epos. v.16, n.1, Fall 1964.
- "This Wrist, This Hand." Epos. v.16, n.4, Summer 1965.
- "The Game." New Lantern Club Review. n.2, Summer 1965.
- "The Flowers." Steppenwolf. n.1, Winter 1965–1966.
- "Vision." Dust/9. v.3, n.1, Fall 1966.
- "Who Whispers Yes." Dust/12. v.3, n.4, Spring 1969.
- "Hi, Low, and Psycho." Excerpts published in Reality Change, Third Quarter, 1996.

== See also ==
- Speaking of Jane Roberts, 2006 book
- Stewart Edward White
- New Thought
