= Upton Park =

Upton Park may refer to:

in football:

- Upton Park (stadium), London, former home ground of West Ham United football club
- Upton Park F.C., a late 19th and early 20th century football club based in Upton Park, London

places in England:

- Upton Park, London, an area within the London Borough of Newham
  - Upton Park tube station, a London Underground station in the area
- Upton Park, Slough, a residential estate
- Upton Park, Merseyside, an area of recreational open space and woodland
- Upton Park, a public park in Torquay, adjacent to the Town Hall
- Upton Country Park, a public park in Poole, Dorset

== See also ==
- Upton (disambiguation)
- Upton House (disambiguation)
