= Arthur Upton (disambiguation) =

Arthur Upton (Arthur Percy Upton, 1777–1855) was a British soldier, politician and cricketer.

Arthur Upton may also refer to:

- Arthur Upton (died 1662), English MP for Devon
- Arthur Upton (1623–1706), Irish MP for Carrickfergus, Antrim and County Antrim
- Arthur Upton (1715–1768), Irish MP for Carrickfergus
- Arthur Upton (South African cricketer) (1923–2015), South African cricketer
- Arthur C. Upton (1923–2015), American pathologist and radiation biologist
