= Upton House =

Upton House may refer to:

== Buildings ==
=== Australia ===
- Home of pioneering Clifton family in Australind, Western Australia

=== United Kingdom ===
- Upton House, Warwickshire, a country house built c.1695, in the care of the National Trust
- Upton House, Dorset, a country house built in 1816
- Upton House, Newham, a building in the London borough of Newham, birthplace of the surgeon Joseph Lister
- Ham House (Newham), London, known as Upton House until the late 1780s

=== United States ===
- George B. Upton House, Wickenburg, Arizona, listed on the National Register of Historic Places (NRHP) in Maricopa County, Arizona
- Upton (Baltimore, Maryland), a house listed on the NRHP
- Blanchard-Upton House, Andover, Massachusetts, NRHP-listed
- William Upton House, Sterling Heights, Michigan, also known as Upton House, NRHP-listed
- Harriet Taylor Upton House, Warren, Ohio, NRHP-listed

== See also ==
- Clark Monroe's Uptown House, Harlem, New York NY was a jazz club and bar, one of the Cradles of Bebop
- Upton Apartments, Ogden, Utah, US, listed on the NRHP in Weber County, Utah
- Upton (disambiguation)
- Upton Park (disambiguation)
