= Seth Material =

Collection of writing dictated by Jane Roberts

The Seth Material is a collection of writing dictated by Jane Roberts to her husband from late 1963 until her death in 1984. Roberts claimed the words were spoken by a discarnate entity named Seth. The material is regarded as one of the cornerstones of New Age philosophy, and the most influential channelled text of the post–World War II "New Age" movement, after the Edgar Cayce books and A Course in Miracles. Jon Klimo writes that the Seth books were instrumental in bringing the idea of channeling to a broad public audience.

According to scholar of religion Catherine Albanese, the 1970 release of the book The Seth Material "launched an era of nationwide awareness ... [of c]ommunication with other-than-human entities ... contributing to the self-identity of an emergent New Age movement". Study groups formed in the United States to work with the Seth Material, and now are found around the world, as well as numerous websites and online groups in several languages, as various titles have been translated into Chinese, Spanish, German, French, Dutch and Arabic.

John P. Newport, in his study of the influence of New Age beliefs, described the central focus of the Seth Material as the idea that each individual creates their own reality, a foundational concept of the New Age movement first articulated in the Seth Material.

== History ==
In late 1963, Jane Roberts and her husband, Robert Butts, experimented with a ouija board as part of Roberts's research for a book on extra-sensory perception. Roberts and Butts claimed that they began to receive coherent messages from a male personality on December 2, 1963, who later identified himself as Seth. Soon after, Roberts reported that she was hearing the messages in her head. She began to dictate the messages instead of using the Ouija board, and the board was eventually abandoned. For 21 years until Roberts's death in 1984 (with a one-year hiatus due to her final illness), Roberts held regular sessions in which she went into a trance and purportedly spoke on behalf of Seth.

According to Roberts, Seth described himself as an "energy personality essence no longer focused in physical matter" who was independent of Roberts's subconscious, although Roberts expressed skepticism as to Seth's origins, frequently referring to Seth's statements as "theories". Roberts claimed that Seth indicated he had completed his earthly reincarnations and was speaking from an adjacent plane of existence. The Seth personality described himself as a "teacher", and said: "this material has been given by himself and others in other times and places, but that it is given again, in new ways, for each succeeding generation through the centuries."

Unlike the psychic Edgar Cayce, whose syntax when speaking in trance was antiquated and convoluted, Roberts's syntax and sentence structures were modern and clear when speaking as Seth. Roberts often sat in a rocking chair during sessions, and she would occasionally smoke cigarettes and sip beer or wine. Afterwards, she claimed to not remember the contents of the session, and she would often read the transcript or ask what Seth had said.

== Summary ==
The core teachings of the Seth Material are based on the principle that consciousness creates matter, that each person creates their own reality through thoughts, feelings, and beliefs. And that the "point of power", through which the individual can affect change, is in the present moment.

It discusses a wide range of metaphysical concepts, including the nature of God (referred to as "All That Is" and "The Multidimensional God"); the nature of physical reality; the origins of the universe; the nature of the self and the "higher self"; the story of Christ; the evolution of the soul and all aspects of death and rebirth, including reincarnation and karma, past lives, after-death experiences, "guardian spirits", and ascension to planes of "higher consciousness"; the purpose of life; the nature of good and evil; the purpose of suffering; multidimensional reality, parallel lives; and transpersonal realms.

=== Nature of the self ===
According to the Seth Material, the entire self or "entity" is a gestalt consisting of the inner self, various selves that the entity has assumed through past existences (physical and non-physical), plus all the currently incarnated selves and all their probable counterparts. Reincarnation is included as a core principle.

Wouter Hanegraaff, Professor of History of Hermetic Philosophy, University of Amsterdam, says that these ideas have been influential to other new age authors (some of whom use the term "higher self" to refer to the same concept), and that Roberts's terminology has been adopted by some of those authors. Hanegraaff says that Seth uses various terms to refer to the concept of the "self", including "entity", "whole self", "gestalt", and "(over)soul".

=== Reality ===
The Seth Material says that all individuals create their own circumstances and experiences within the shared earthly environment, similar to the doctrine of responsibility assumption. This concept is expressed in the phrase "you create your own reality", which may have originated with the Seth readings. The inner self, or inner ego, is responsible for the construction and maintenance of the individual's physical body and immediate physical environment, and the unfolding of events is determined by the expectations, attitudes and beliefs of the outer ego, that portion of the self that human beings know as themselves. "If you want to change your world, you must first change your thoughts, expectations, and beliefs." Or, more succinctly: "You get what you concentrate upon. There is no other main rule".

The books discuss the idea that a living network of panpsychism constructs and maintains the physical environment via the inner selves of the individual occupants (including both living and inert matter). The inner selves project, en masse, a pattern for physical reality that is then filled with energy, as needed, by each individual. All events are also produced in the same manner.

== Complete writings of Jane Roberts ==
=== Books ===
- (1966). How To Develop Your ESP Power. Publisher: Federick Fell. (Later retitled and reprinted as The Coming of Seth.) ISBN 0-8119-0379-6.
- (1970). The Seth Material. Reprinted, 2001 by New Awareness Network. ISBN 978-0-9711198-0-2 .
- (1972). Seth Speaks: The Eternal Validity of the Soul. Reprinted 1994 by Amber-Allen Publishing. ISBN 1-878424-07-6.
- (1974). The Nature of Personal Reality. Prentice-Hall. Reprinted 1994, Amber-Allen Publishing. ISBN 1-878424-06-8.
- (1975). Adventures in Consciousness: An Introduction to Aspect Psychology. Prentice-Hall. ISBN 0-13-013953-X.
- (1975). Dialogues of the Soul and Mortal Self in Time. Prentice-Hall. ISBN 0-13-208538-0. Poetry.
- (1976). Psychic Politics: An Aspect Psychology Book. Prentice-Hall. ISBN 0-13-731752-2.
- (1977). The "Unknown" Reality Vol. 1. Prentice-Hall. Reprinted 1997, Amber-Allen Publishing. ISBN 1-878424-25-4.
- (1979). The "Unknown" Reality Vol. 2. Prentice-Hall. Reprinted 1997, Amber-Allen Publishing. ISBN 1-878424-26-2 .
- (1977). The World View of Paul Cézanne: A Psychic Interpretation. Prentice-Hall. ISBN 0-13-968859-5.
- (1978). The Afterdeath Journal of An American Philosopher: The World View of William James. Prentice-Hall. ISBN 0-13-018515-9.
- (1979). Emir's Education in the Proper Use of Magical Powers. Prentice-Hall. ISBN 1-57174-142-9. Children's literature.
- (1979). The Nature of the Psyche: Its Human Expression. Prentice-Hall. Reprinted 1996, Amber-Allen Publishing. ISBN 1-878424-22-X .
- (1981). The Individual and the Nature of Mass Events. Prentice-Hall, ISBN 0-13-457259-9. Reprinted 1994, Amber-Allen Publishing, ISBN 1-878424-21-1.
- (1995). The Oversoul Seven Trilogy. Amber-Allen Publishing. ISBN 1-878424-17-3. Edition: Paperback; May 1, 1995 (originally published as three separate books: The Education of Oversoul 7 (1973); The Further Education of Oversoul Seven (1979); Oversoul Seven and the Museum of Time (1984)).
- (1981). The God of Jane: A Psychic Manifesto. Prentice-Hall. ISBN 0-01-335749-2. Reprinted 2000, Moment Point Press. ISBN 0-9661327-5-0.
- (1982). If We Live Again, Or, Public Magic and Private Love. Prentice-Hall. ISBN 0-13-450619-7. Poetry.
- (1986). Dreams, Evolution and Value Fulfillment. Prentice-Hall, two volumes, ISBN 0-13-219452-X and ISBN 0-13-219460-0.
- (1986). Seth, Dreams and Projections of Consciousness. Stillpoint Publishing.
- (1993). A Seth Reader. Vernal Equinox Press. Compendium edited by Richard Roberts. ISBN 0-942380-15-0.
- (1995). The Magical Approach : Seth Speaks About the Art of Creative Living. Amber-Allen Publishing. ISBN 1-878424-09-2.
- (1997). The Way Toward Health. Robert F. Butts (Foreword), Amber-Allen Publishing. ISBN 1-878424-30-0.
- (2006). The World View of Rembrandt. New Awareness Network. ISBN 0-9768978-2-2.
- (1997 and after). The Early Sessions (Sessions 1 through 510 of the Seth Material). New Awareness Network. Edited by Robert Butts. Nine volumes. ISBN 0-9652855-0-2.
- (2003). The Personal Sessions. New Awareness Network. Deleted session material. Seven volumes. ISBN 0-9711198-4-8.
- The Early Class Sessions. New Awareness Network. Four volumes.

=== Short fiction ===
- "Prayer of a Wiser People" in Profile, 1950.
- "The Red Wagon" in The Magazine of Fantasy & Science Fiction, 1956 (republished 1993, Reality Change Magazine; anthologized in 1975, Ladies of Fantasy: Two Centuries of Sinister Stories by the Gentler Sex edited by Seon Manley and Gogo Lewis)
- "The Canvas Pyramid" in The Magazine of Fantasy & Science Fiction, 1957 (French edition, 1958)
- "First Communion" in Fantastic Universe, 1957
- "The Chestnut Beads" in The Magazine of Fantasy & Science Fiction, 1957 (French translation, 1958; anthologized in Rod Serling's Triple W: Witches, Warlocks and Werewolves, edited by Gordon R. Dickson, 1963)
- "The Bundu" (novella in The Magazine of Fantasy & Science Fiction, 1958
- "A Demon at Devotions" in The Magazine of Fantasy & Science Fiction, 1958 (reprinted in Reality Change Magazine, Winter 1994)
- "Nightmare" in The Magazine of Fantasy & Science Fiction, 1959
- "Impasse" in The Magazine of Fantasy & Science Fiction, 1959 (Spanish anthology translation ca. 1960)
- "Three Times Around" in The Magazine of Fantasy & Science Fiction, 1964 (anthologized in Earth Invaded edited by Isaac Asimov, Martin H. Greenberg and Charles G. Waugh, 1982)
- "The Big Freeze" in Dude, 1965 (reprinted in Reality Change Magazine, Summer 1994)
- "The Mission," purchased by Topper magazine in August, 1965 (publication unconfirmed)

=== Poetry ===
- "Time" in The Saratogian [Saratoga Springs, NY], 1947 Mar 19.
- "Enigma" in The Saratogian, 1947 Mar 19.
- "Spring Gaiety" in The Saratogian, 1947 Apr 26.
- "Rain" in Profile [Skidmore College literary magazine], December, 1947.
- "Pretense" in Profile, December, 1947.
- "Code" in Profile, December, 1947.
- "Skyscrapers" in Profile, December, 1947.
- "Introvert" in Profile, May, 1948.
- "Poem" in Profile, May, 1948.
- "How Public Like a Frog" in Profile, Fall, 1948.
- "Motorcycle Ride" in Profile, Fall, 1948.
- "Echo" in Profile, May, 1949.
- "Death Stood at the Door" in Profile, May, 1949.
- "Compromise" in Profile, May, 1949.
- "I Shall Die in the Springtime." Patterns. v.1, n.1, October 1954.
- "Lyric" Patterns. v.1, n.1, October 1954.
- "Matilda" in Quicksilver, Spring, 1960.
- "It is Springtime, Grandfather." Epos., v.12, n.3, Spring 1961.
- "The Familiar." Bitterroot. v.1, n.2, Winter 1962.
- "I Saw a Hand" in Treasures of Parnassus: Best Poems of 1962, Young Publications, 1962 (reprinted in The Elmira Star-Gazette, 1962).
- "My Grandfather's World" Epos. v.14, n.3, Spring 1963.
- "Lullaby" Epos. v.14, n.3, Spring 1963.
- "Beware, October" Epos. v.16, n.1, Fall 1964.
- "This Wrist, This Hand" Epos. v.16, n.4, Summer 1965.
- "The Game" New Lantern Club Review. n.2, Summer 1965.
- "The Flowers" Steppenwolf. n.1, Winter 1965–1966.
- "Vision" Dust/9. v.3, n.1, Fall 1966.
- "Who Whispers Yes" Dust/12. v.3, n.4, Spring 1969.
- "Hi, Low, and Psycho" Excerpts published in Reality Change, Third Quarter, 1996.

=== Seth Material-related works from other authors ===
- Gellis, Barrie (2025).2nd Edition Seth Material Q&A: The Spiritual Inner Journey of Self-Awareness: Original Seth Class Member Answers Your Questions. ISBN 9798307337196
- Cobban, James (2022 ). Nursery of the Gods: The Consciousness Paradigm, or the Science of Seth. ISBN 979-8365356863.
- Cobban, James (2023). Nursery of the Gods, Volume Two: Earth as a Training System. ISBN 979-8374736748.
- Watkins, Susan M. Conversations with Seth. Moment Point Press, 2005, 2006, two volumes. ISBN 1-930491-05-0 and ISBN 1-930491-09-3 original version published: Vol. 1 (1980), Vol 2 (1981).
- O'Keefe, Chiron (2023). An Emerging Soul's Guide to Awareness: Seth, Mysticism, and the Journey of Life. ISBN 9798875520655.
- Dahl, Lynda Madden (1993). Beyond the Winning Streak: Using Conscious Creation to Consistently Win at Life. The Woodbridge Group. ISBN 978-1-889964-10-2.
- Dahl, Lynda Madden (1995). Ten Thousand Whispers: A Guide to Conscious Creation. The Woodbridge Group. ISBN 978-1-889964-06-5.
- Dahl, Lynda Madden (1997). The Wizards of Consciousness: Making the Imponderable Practical. The Woodbridge Group. ISBN 978-1-889964-03-4.
- Dahl, Lynda Madden (2001). The Book of Fallacies: A Little Primer of New Thought. Moment Point Press. ISBN 0-9661327-9-3.
- Dahl, Lynda Madden (2012). Living a Safe Universe: A Book for Seth Readers. The Woodbridge Group. ISBN 978-1-889964-13-3.
- Dahl, Lynda Madden (2013). Living a Safe Universe, Vol. 2: A Book for Seth Readers. The Woodbridge Group. ISBN 978-1-889964-15-7.
- Dahl, Lynda Madden (2014). Living a Safe Universe, Vol. 3: A Book for Seth Readers. The Woodbridge Group. ISBN 978-1-889964-17-1.
- Dahl, Lynda Madden (2015). Living a Safe Universe, Vol. 4: Seth and Psychic Health. The Woodbridge Group. ISBN 978-1-889964-21-8.
- Friedman, Norman (1994). Bridging Science and Spirit: Common Elements in David Bohm's Physics, The Perennial Philosophy and Seth. The Woodbridge Group. ISBN 978-1-889964-07-2.
- Friedman, Norman (1997). The Hidden Domain: Home of the Quantum Wave Function, Nature's Creative Source. The Woodbridge Group. ISBN 978-1-889964-09-6.
- Stack, Rick. Out-Of-Body Adventures : 30 days to the Most Exciting Experience of Your Life. Contemporary Books. ISBN 0-8092-4560-4.
- Ashley, Nancy. Create Your Own Reality : A Seth Workbook. Prentice-Hall Press, 1984. ISBN 0-13-189127-8.
- Ashley, Nancy. Create Your Own Happiness: A Seth Workbook. Prentice-Hall Press, 1988. ISBN 0-13-189226-6.
- Ashley, Nancy. Create Your Own Dreams: A Seth Workbook. Prentice-Hall Press, 1990. ISBN 0-13-189382-3.
- Watkins, Susan M. Speaking of Jane Roberts: Remembering the Author of the Seth Material. Moment Point Press, 2001. ISBN 0-9661327-7-7.
- Hsu, Tien-Sheng. The Secret to Healing Cancer: A Chinese Psychiatrist and Family Doctor Presents His Amazing Method For Curing Cancer Through Psychological and Spiritual Growth. New Awareness Network, 2011. ISBN 0-9849285-0-2.
- Kendall, Richard. The Road To Elmira, Volume 1 : A former student of Jane Roberts recounts his experiences while attending Jane's classes. Rich Kendall Books, 2011. ISBN 0-9835776-0-9; ISBN 978-0-9835776-0-7.
- Helfrich, Paul M. Seth: The Ultimate Guide. New World View Publishing, 2010. ISBN 978-0-9828123-0-3.

== Relationship with Christianity ==
According to the Seth Material, Jesus Christ exists as part of the Christ entity, a highly evolved entity who exists in many systems of reality. At the time of Christ, the Christ entity incarnated as three individuals: John the Baptist, Jesus of Nazareth, and Paul or Saul of Tarsus.

== Other authorship claims ==
Other authors have written material they claimed was channeled from Seth, especially after Roberts's death. These included Thomas Massari, who founded the Seth-Hermes Foundation and said he had channeled Seth as early as 1972; and Jean Loomis, director of the Aquarian Center in Connecticut. However, in the introduction to the first book written about Seth, he is said to have conveyed that "communications will come exclusively through Ruburt [Seth's name for Jane] at all times, to protect the integrity of the material". In The Seth Material, Roberts wrote: "Several people have told me that Seth communicated with them through automatic writing, but Seth denies any such contacts."

== Criticism ==
Charles Upton in his book The System of Antichrist, argues that the reason Jane Roberts multiplies the self in many ways is due to a fear of death, and that the Seth texts are based on a misunderstanding of both Christianity and Eastern religions. The implied influences of Eastern mysticism and philosophy are also highlighted in Astrology and Psychic Phenomena by Terry Holley, E Calvin Beisner and Robert M Bowman Jr, who say, "Husband Robert Butts admitted that similarities exist between Seth's ideas and those of various religious, philosophical, and mystical doctrines from the Near, Middle, or Far East . . . and we've done a little reading on Buddhism, Hinduism, Zen, and Taoism, for example, not to mention subjects like shamanism, voodooism, and obeah." According to Robert C. Fuller, Seth filled the role of guide for what Fuller called "unchurched American spirituality," including the topics of reincarnation, karma, free will, ancient metaphysical wisdom, and "Christ consciousness." James Alcock wrote "there seems little need to consider the involvement of any supernatural agency."

Psychologist Paul Cunningham of Rivier University, New Hampshire, analyzed the case of Jane Roberts in his 2010 paper "The Problem of Seth's Origin", concluding that "fraud and cryptomnesia are highly improbable explanations" and suggesting that to "emphasize and expect fraud and trickery ... is essentially a misleading, though culturally expectable, response" to such cases.

== See also ==
- Biocentric universe
- Counterpart theory
- Modal realism
- Idealism
- Many-minds interpretation
- Brane cosmology
- J. B. Priestley's Time Plays
