= Upton station =

Upton station may refer to:

- Upton railway station, in Upton, Merseyside, England
- Upton and Blewbury railway station, former railway station in Oxfordshire, England
- Upton (PRR station), former rail station near Philadelphia, Pennsylvania, USA
- Upton–Avenue Market station, a rail station in Baltimore, Maryland, USA
- Upton-by-Chester railway station, a former railway station in Upton-by-Chester, England

== See also ==
- Upton (disambiguation)
