= Haselor =

Village in Warwickshire, England

Coordinates: 52.21957°N 1.82209°W

- Location within Warwickshire
- Population: 220 (2011)
- OS grid reference: SP122579
- Shire county: Warwickshire
- Region: West Midlands
- Country: England
- Sovereign state: United Kingdom
- Post town: Alcester
- Postcode district: B49
- Dialling code: 01789
- Police: Warwickshire
- Fire: Warwickshire
- Ambulance: West Midlands

Haselor is a village in Warwickshire. It is by the River Alne, about one mile east of Alcester just off the A46 main road to Stratford-upon-Avon. The parish church is remote from the present houses, the old village having been demolished after a plague epidemic.

== History ==
The present day Haselor parish church was formed from the amalgamation of the parishes of Upton and Haselor. Both these have ancient manors dating back to the Domesday Book. The longest tenure of Haselor manor was by St Mary's College, Warwick, from 1395 to about 1530. A selection of early photographs of Haselor, Upton, and also the neighbouring village of Walcote, is available on the website Haselor & Walcote Local History from Walcote Farm. This has other local history information, including a list of the farms in Haselor Parish in 1767.

== Parish Church ==
St Mary and All Saints Church is located on a hill and accessed by two footpaths, each of about a quarter-mile, on opposite sides. One of the longest serving Vicars was Rev. John Heath Sykes. In March 1914 many parishioners subscribed towards a Bible and a sun dial as a memorial of his work as Vicar. The clock on the church tower was paid for by public subscription as a war memorial in thanksgiving for the end of the First World War. Tablets inside the porch form one public record of those who died in the two world wars. Additional Rolls of Honour, of which one was found more recently folded inside a bible are on display inside the church.

== School ==
The village has a primary school that is a part of the Tudor grange trust ranging from nursery to Year 6. The village has a foundation school, taking children aged 4 to 11. In 2003, 11 pupils were assessed at Key Stages 1 and 2, with the school being ranked 16 out of 151 in Warwickshire.

== Gallery ==
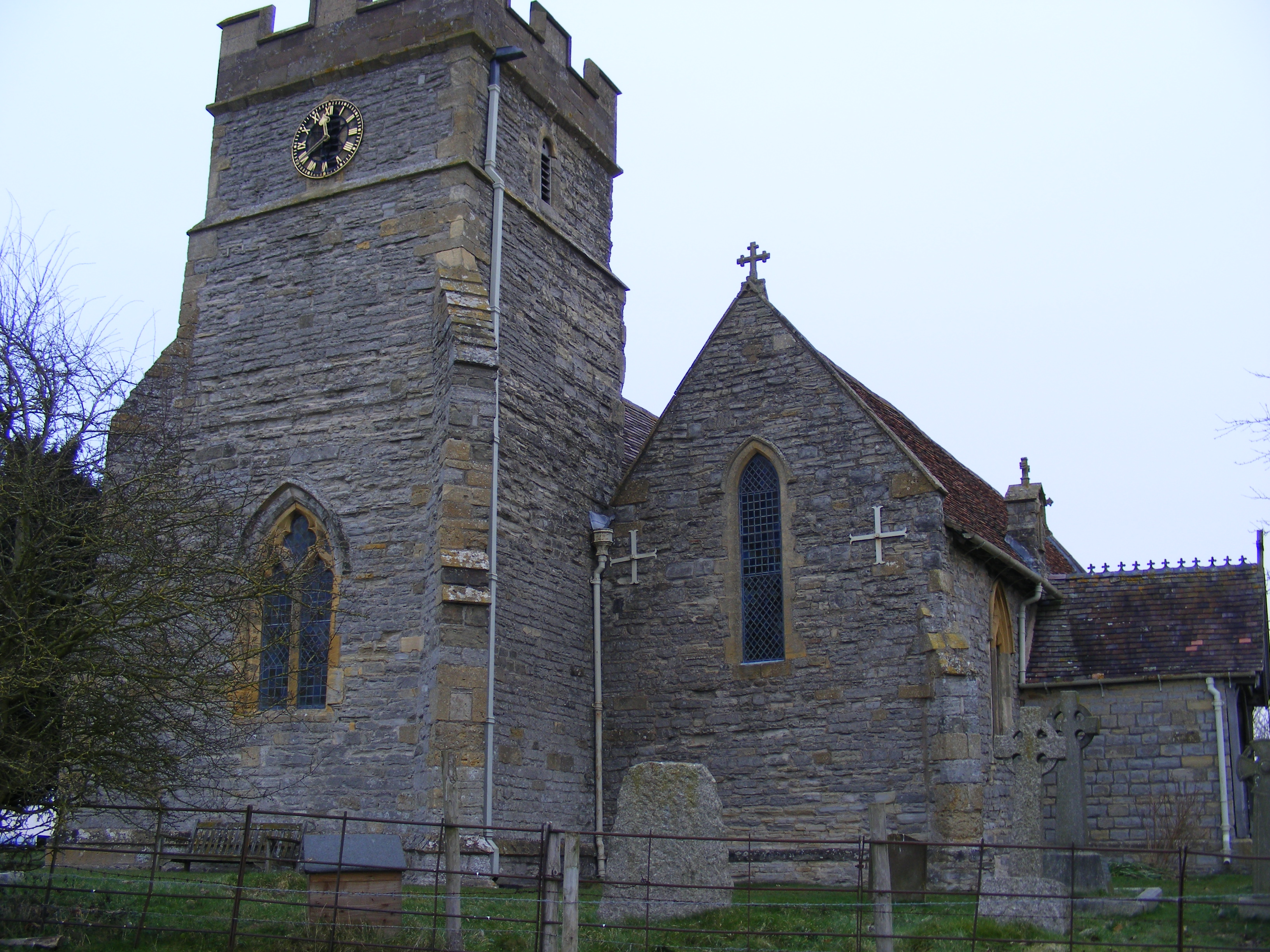
Haselor church tower

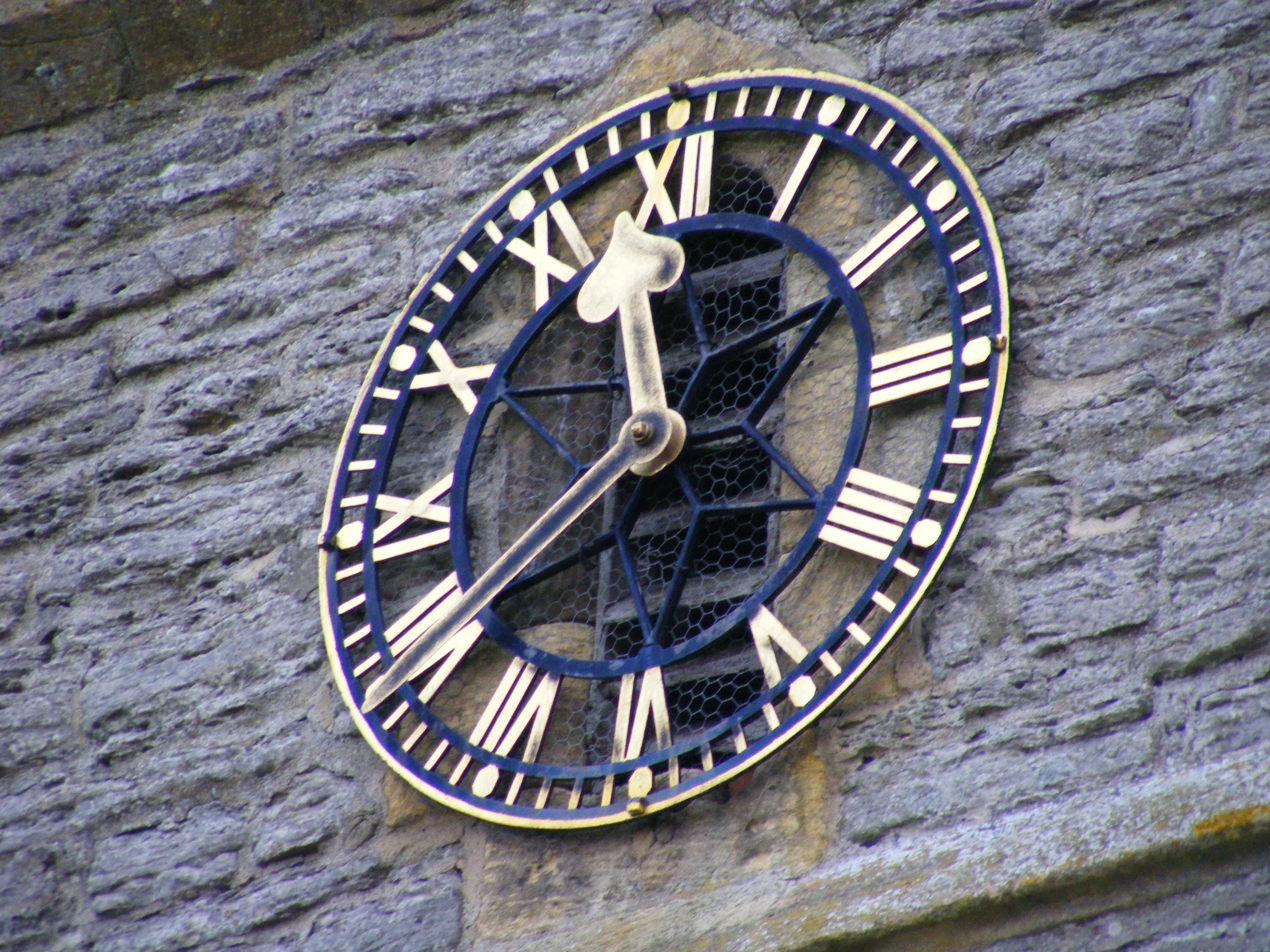
Close up of the clock, which is the War Memorial in Haselor

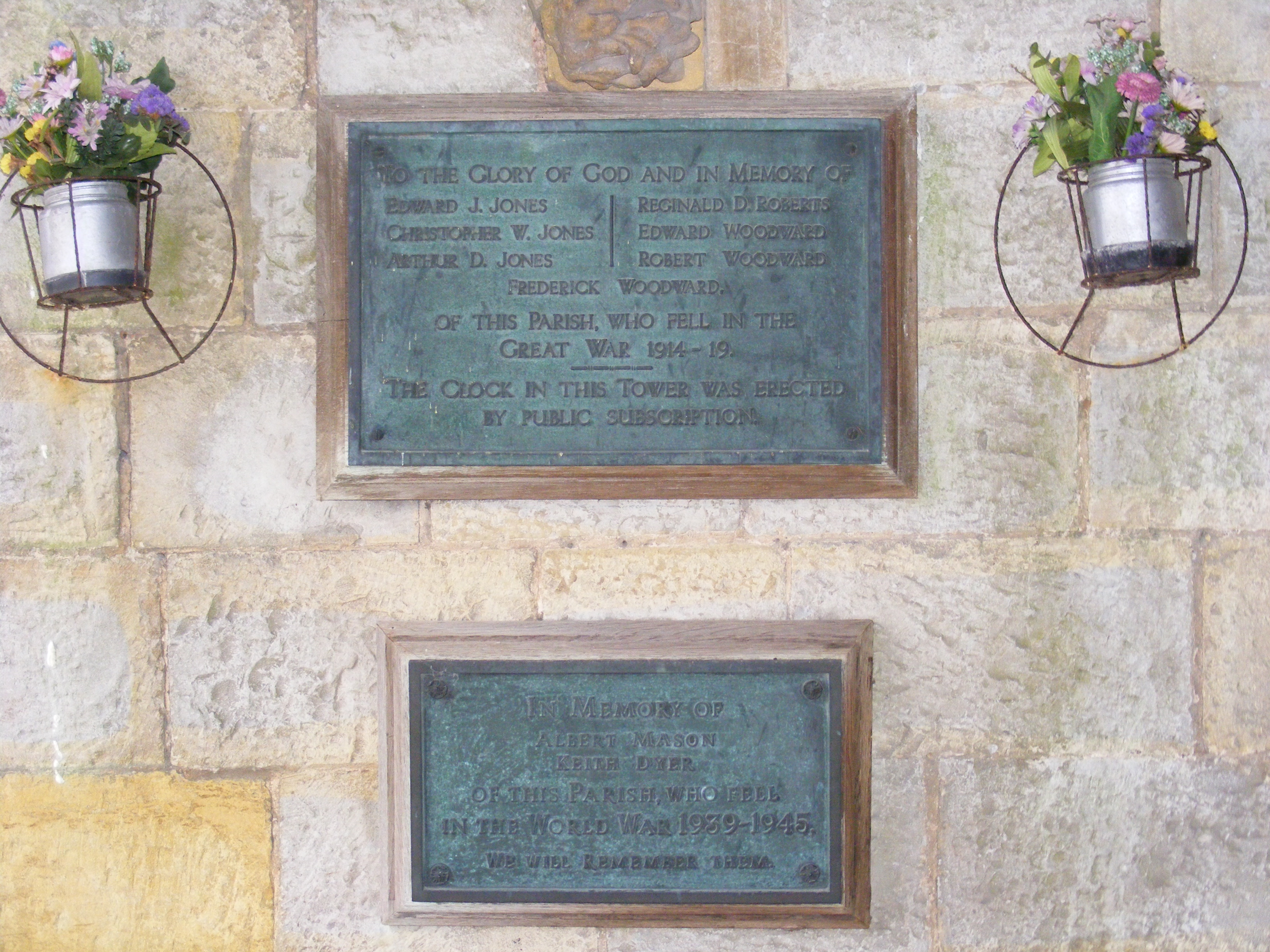
War memorial tablets in the porch

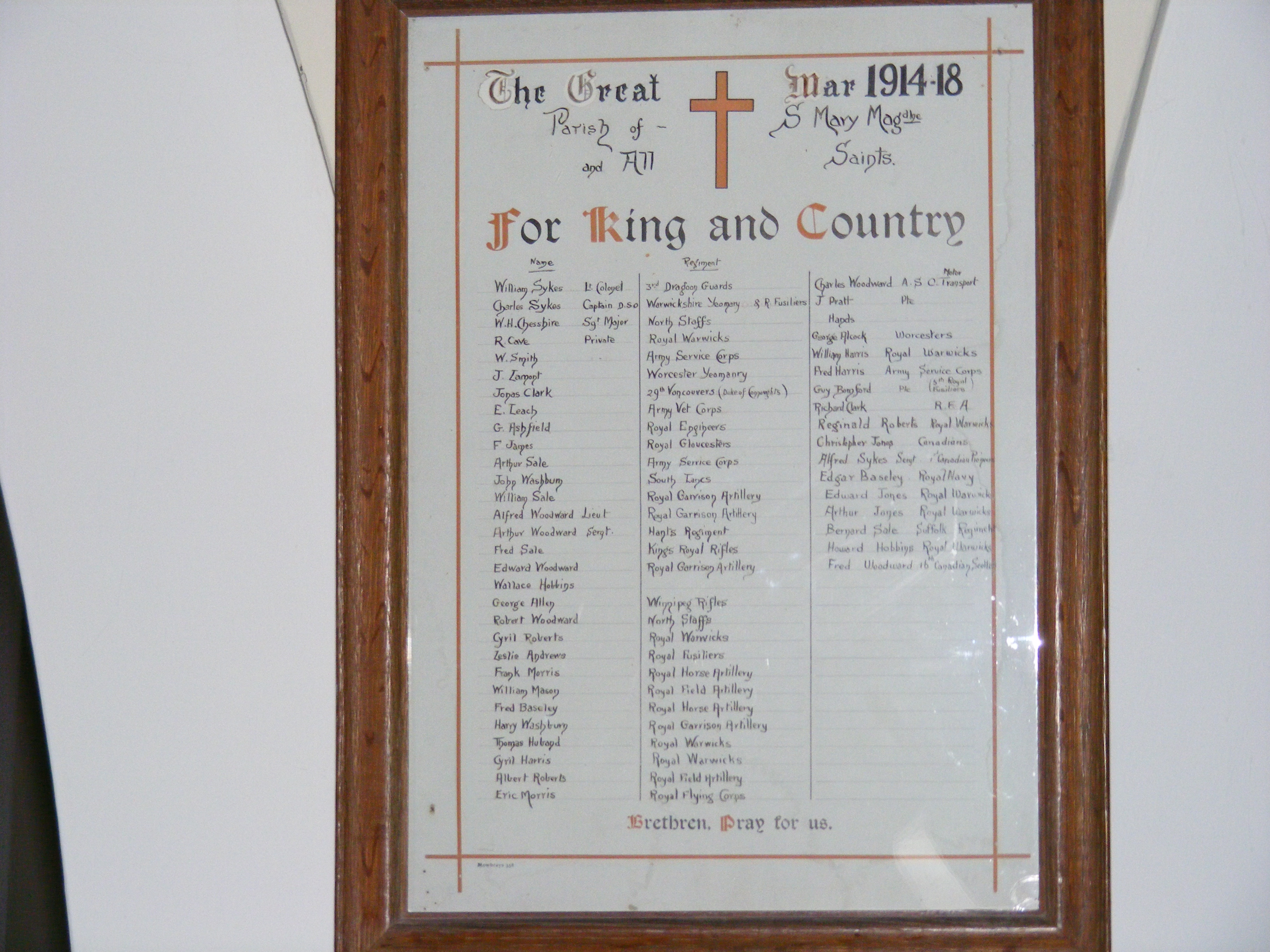
Roll of Honour for those from Haselor who served in World War I

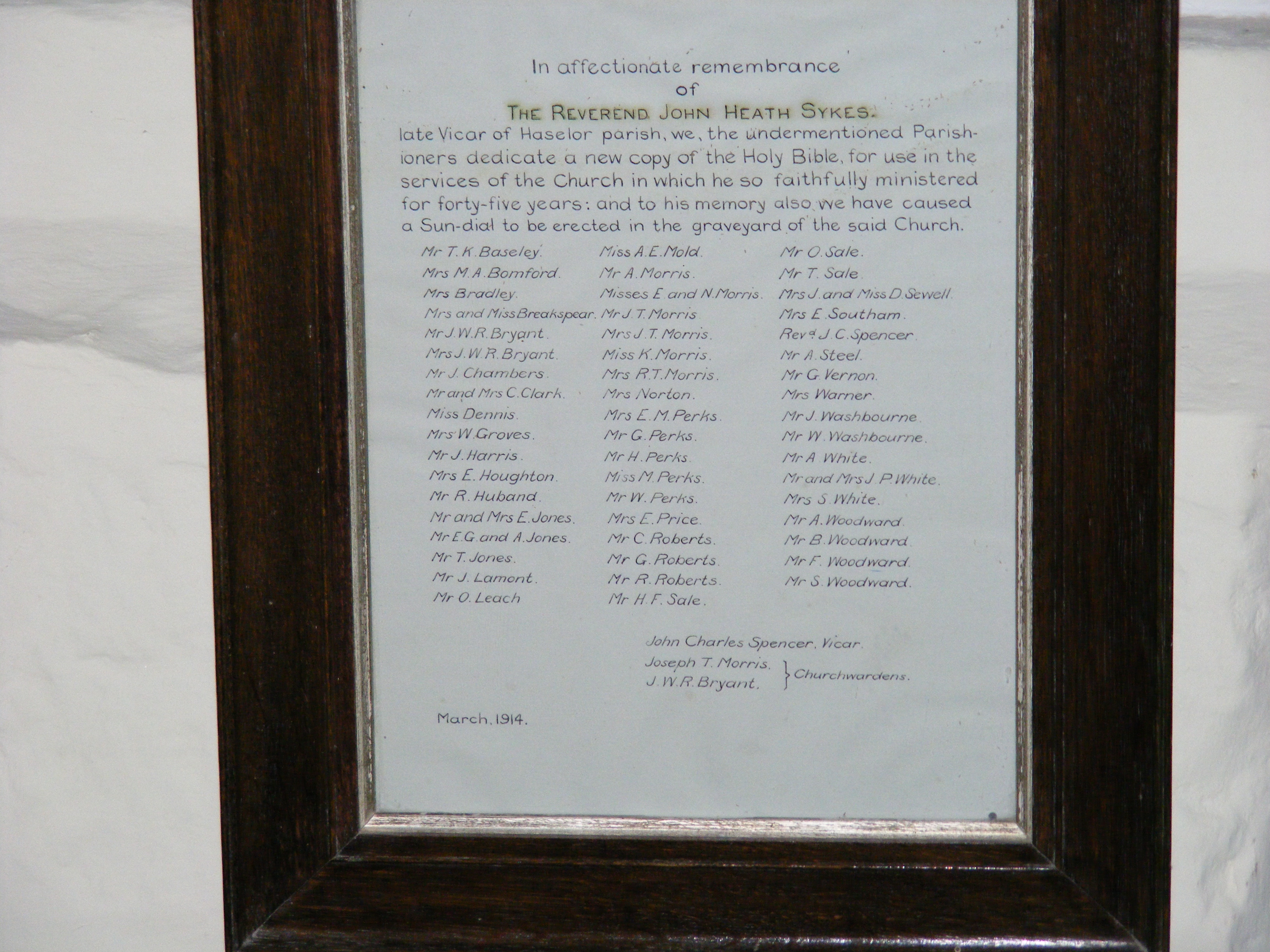
List of subscriptions in March 1914 towards memorial for Rev. John Heath Sykes
