= Partnership for Peace Consortium of Defense Academies and Security Studies Institutes =

Defence academy network

The Partnership for Peace Consortium
- Founded: 1998
- Type of Organization: Non-profit Organization
- Headquarters: Garmisch-Partenkirchen, Germany
- Governing Board Members: Austria, Canada, Germany, NATO International Staff, Poland, Romania, Sweden, Switzerland, United States
- Executive Director: LTC Olaf Garlich
- Headquarters Staff: 4
- Network of Contributors: 100+
- Website: www.pfp-consortium.org

The Partnership for Peace Consortium is a network of over 800 defense academies and security studies institutes across 60 countries. Founded in 1998 during the NATO Summit, the PfPC was chartered to promote defense institution building and foster regional stability through multinational education and research, which the PfPC accomplishes via a network of educators and researchers. It is based at the George C. Marshall European Center for Security Studies in Garmisch-Partenkirchen, Germany. According to the PfPC Annual Report of 2012, in 2012 eight hundred defense academies and security studies institutes in 59 countries worked with the PfPC in 69 defense education/defense institution building and policy-relevant events. The Consortium publishes an academic quarterly journal CONNECTIONS in English and Russian. The journal is run by an international editorial board of experts and is distributed to over 1,000 institutions in 54 countries.

== Background ==
The PfPC was founded in 1998 in response to the speech by United States Secretary of Defense William Cohen, "Toward a Cooperative Security Network for the 21st Century". The speech was delivered during the 12 June 1998 meeting of the Euro-Atlantic Partnership Council (EAPC) defense ministers and similar sentiments were echoed in the concluding documents of the NATO and EAPC Summits on 24 and 25 April 1999. The PfPC was originally co-sponsored by the United States and Germany to work in the spirit of the Partnership for Peace Program "to strengthen defense and military education through enhanced national and institutional cooperation." Since its founding, the PfPC's sponsorship has expanded, with contributions from numerous partner states and organizations. In the Canadian House of Commons in 2017, the PfPC's long contribution "in promoting stability, security, and democracy" was noted by the Honorable Wayne Easter, Liberal MP for Malpeque.

Upon its establishment, the PfPC was chartered with the following objectives:

- Strengthen defense, military, and security policy education through enhanced national and institutional cooperation
- Strengthen civilian and military leadership capabilities in national security and strategic-level military planning
- Enhance multinational education through collaborative approaches linking defense practitioners, scholars, researchers, and experts into activity-based networks that facilitate the sharing of knowledge
- Extend the scope of educational cooperation throughout the Euro-Atlantic region to include not only governmental defense academies and security studies institutes, but also other governmental, non-governmental, and private organizations whether they are institutes, agencies or universities
- Increase the scope of the multinational research on critical issues confronting partner nations

== Organization ==
The PfPC is governed by a Senior Advisory Council (SAC), with high level government representatives from Austria, Bulgaria, Canada, Germany, NATO International Staff, Poland, Romania, Sweden, Switzerland, United States. SAC members can be permanent or rotational depending on the interests of the contributing state or organization. The SAC meets annually to review the PfPC's activities, providing guidance to ensure activities match the PfPC's founding principles.

The PfPC organizes its activities through Working Groups and Study Groups, which address relevant topics in international security and related fields. In total there are nine groups, each with a chair, Co-chair, and Technical Advisors, who contribute to the groups' activities voluntarily or otherwise. The Chairs and Co-Chairs comprise the PfPC's Consortium Steering Committee (CSC). The CSC meets annually to provide updates on their activities and to determine future activities, ensuring activities are aligned with SAC directions.

== Activity Groups ==
Over 90 PfPC events per year across the US, Europe and Central Asia provide the activity groups with a forum for debate and exchange of ideas on contemporary security topics. Such forums are designed to identify and facilitate options for nonviolent resolution to international differences, and to further defense education transformation goals in recipient countries. The groups benefit from a multinational, multidisciplinary network of experts across defense, academia, industry, and civil society.

=== Working Groups ===
==== Advanced Distributed Learning ====
The Advanced Distributed Learning Working Group's mission is to strengthen e-learning-based defense and security policy education through international and institutional collaboration. The activities include the creation and sharing of interactive, widely needed e-learning courseware; providing access to interoperable, open-source e-learning technologies; and the exchange and dissemination of ADL-based best practices. A strategic goal is to contribute to the Defense Education Enhancement Program (DEEP) and integrate interested Partner nations into the ADL community of practice. The Advanced Distributed Learning Working Group coordinates and standardizes training and promotes innovation.

==== Education Development ====
The Education Development Working Group (EDWG) is designed to strengthen defense education in partner nations and consists of two core components:

- Reference Curriculum
- Faculty Development

These two core components are facilitated by the multinational staffed Defense Education Enhancement Program (DEEP). DEEP is central to EDWG activities, supporting foreign government defense learning institution efforts to: (1) enhance the quality and relevance of curriculum and to (2) promote faculty development and modern learning techniques within a framework of individually tailored multi-year action plans. As of December 2014, DEEP programs were underway in 13 nations: Afghanistan, Armenia, Azerbaijan, Croatia, Georgia, Iraq, Kazakhstan, Mauritania, Moldova, Mongolia, Serbia, Ukraine, and Uzbekistan.

==== Emerging Security Challenges ====
The Emerging Security Challenges (ESC) Working Group aims to enhance the capacity of decision makers and policy shapers to identify and respond to emerging security challenges. Specifically, its goal is to identify and prioritize such challenges and discuss possible political frameworks and mechanisms to address them. “Emerging Security Challenges” has become a term used at NATO and in public debate to deal with potential, upcoming, non-traditional threats to our security. The working group does not have a defined set of issues for analysis - rather, it remains open to include new challenges as they arise. Along with the EDWG, the Emerging Security Challenges working group under the leadership of Sean Costigan(George C. Marshall Center for European Security Studies) and Michael Hennessy (Royal Military College of Canada) led the creation of the NATO/PFPC Cybersecurity Generic Reference Curriculum. The curriculum was endorsed by the NATO Supreme Allied Commander Transformation, and is currently available in four languages: English, French, Arabic and Russian.

==== Security Sector Reform ====
The Security Sector Reform Working Group (SSRWG) was formally established in 2001 and is financially supported by the Swiss Federal Department of Defence, Civil Protection and Sport. Its stated objectives are “to enhance the exchange of ideas, insights, expertise, knowledge and best practices of security sector reform processes between consolidating and consolidated democracies in the Euro-Atlantic area”. From 2010, the group began to focus more on human security issues and has taken a particular interest in how to improve gender equality through defence transformation. This led the group to identify teaching gender to the military as an area that warranted greater attention, resulting in a series of workshops organised in collaboration with the EDWG, starting in 2012. These have been attended by representatives from NATO and Partner countries specialising in military education, gender education and integrating gender in military operations. The SSRWG's current activities are centred on the development of a handbook to document the findings of the workshop series.

=== Study Groups ===
==== Regional Security in Southeast Europe ====
The Regional Stability in Southeast Europe Study Group contributes to peace and security in Southeast Europe. Its working principles include the following:

- Evaluate the situation and factors in the South East European region that promote regional stability through enhanced international co-operation, especially with institutions located in or close to the region of interest
- Carry out strategic research on an academic level supplementary to and stimulating the practical work done in the region
- Provide support for the improvement of networks in the field of security policy and help create a peaceful, strategic and stable community in the Southeast Europe region compatible to the broader Partnership for Peace network and beyond

==== Regional Security in the South Caucasus ====
The PfPC's Regional Security in the South Caucasus Study Group actively seeks to foster stability in the region through facilitating dialogue among diverse parties. The activities of the group serve to advise broader conflict resolution activities, such as the Geneva Talks and the OSCE Minsk Group. The group pursues its goals by focusing on the following areas:

- Ensuring multinational participation, building on experts from all dimensions of the security-political spectrum of the three core countries Armenia, Azerbaijan and Georgia: This is paralleled by bringing in experts on regional stability issues from the main partner countries and institutions to the region, namely the European Union (Member States), the Russian Federation, Turkey, the United States, as well as NATO, the OSCE and the UN.
- Building a constructive network of academic and policy-making influence: This includes involving civil society, think-tanks and defense institutions in the group's work.
- Encouraging an alteration of the conflicting narrative in the region in order to progress conflict negotiation

== Products and services ==
Supported by the research and activities of the study/working groups, the PfPC offers the following services:

- Defense education curriculum development
- Education delivery methods (e.g. distributed computer-based learning)
- Foreign policy recommendation papers
- Information sharing, coordination of skills and assets

== Publications ==
Connections: The Quarterly Journal, is a peer-reviewed open access academic journal covering security, defense, armed forces, conflict, intelligence, history, war, and related issues. It was established in 2002 by the Partnership, and is published in both hardcover and PDF. The four issues in volume 1 were published in English, French, German, and Russian. Starting with volume 2, the journal is published in English and Russian, with the exception of volumes 7–10, which were published in English only. Editorial decisions are made by the journal's editorial board under the guidance of the PfP Consortium's Senior Advisory Council (SAC). Members of SAC are the commandants of the defense academies of Austria, Bulgaria, Canada, Poland and Sweden, the director of the George C. Marshall European Center for Security Studies, senior representatives of NATO and DCAF, and the executive director of the Consortium. The journal is abstracted and indexed in Scopus, JSTOR, ProQuest, EBSCO databases, Columbia International Affairs Online, and the International Relations and Security Network.
