= Uxbridge Moor =

Coordinates: 51.5407°N 0.4917°W

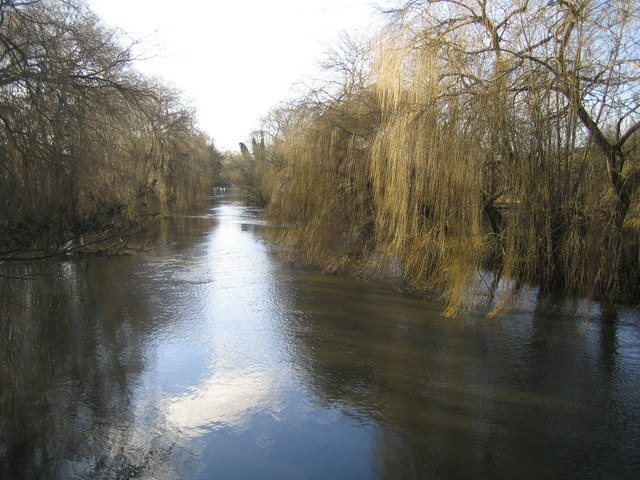

Uxbridge Moor is a nature reserve in Uxbridge in the London Borough of Hillingdon. It is a Site of Metropolitan Importance for Nature Conservation.

The site is on an island in the River Colne. It has two meadows and willow woodland. There are common plant species such as oat grass, couch grass, nettles, but also some rarer ones such as hammer sedge. Birds include kingfishers, and butterflies the speckled wood. At the northern end there is an area of damp grassland.

There is access by a bridge off St John's Road, at north end of Riverside Way Industrial Estate.
