= John Upton =

John Upton may refer to:

== Politicians ==
- John Upton (died c.1453), MP for Warwick
- John Upton, 1st Viscount Templetown (1771–1846), British Member of Parliament for Bury St Edmunds
- John Upton (died 1687) (1639–1687), British Member of Parliament for Dartmouth
- John Upton (born 1718), Member of Parliament for Westmorland
- John Upton (mayor), Mayor of Auckland City 1889–1891
- John Upton (Irish politician), Member of the Parliament of Ireland for County Antrim 1725–1741
- John Upton (died 1641) (1590–1641), British Member of Parliament for Dartmouth
- John Upton, MP for Haverfordwest 1656–1660

== Others ==
- Sir John Upton (died 1551), one of the last leaders of the English Langue of the Knights of St. John
- John Upton (civil engineer) (1774–1851), English civil engineer and contractor working in England and Russia
- John Upton (Spenser editor) (1707–1760), early editor of Edmund Spenser
- John Upton, president of the Baptist World Alliance
- John A. Upton (born 1850), painter active in South Australia
- John Charles Upton Jr. (?–2013), American documentary film maker
