= Arthur Upton (South African cricketer) =

South African cricketer (1923–2015)

Personal information
- Full name: Arthur Louis Upton
- Born: 20 August 1923; Pietermaritzburg, Natal Province, South Africa
- Died: 16 July 2015 (aged 91); KwaZulu-Natal, South Africa
- Batting: Left-handed
- Bowling: Right-arm leg-spin

Domestic team information
- Years: Team
- 1948-49 to 1956-57: Natal

Career statistics
Competition	First-class
Matches	31
Runs scored	1190
Batting average	29.02
100s/50s	1/6
Top score	126
Balls bowled	1048
Wickets	11
Bowling average	41.45
5 wickets in innings	0
10 wickets in match	0
Best bowling	2/13
Catches/stumpings	15/–
- Source: Cricinfo, 15 October 2018

Arthur Louis Upton (20 August 1923 – 16 July 2015) was a South African cricketer who played first-class cricket for Natal from 1949 to 1956.

A left-handed middle-order batsman and leg-spin bowler, Upton was a regular in the Natal side for the four seasons from 1951–52 to 1954–55. He made his only century in 1954–55, scoring 126 and adding 249 for the fifth wicket with Roy McLean when Natal defeated Orange Free State by an innings.

Upton died in KwaZulu-Natal on 16 July 2015, at the age of 91.
