= George Upton =

George Upton may refer to:

- George Upton (died 1609) (1553–1609), Member of the English Parliament in 1584, 1601 and 1604
- George Upton, 3rd Viscount Templetown (1802–1890), Irish soldier and politician
- George Bruce Upton (1804–1874), American shipbuilder and politician in Massachusetts
- George Putnam Upton (1834–1919), American journalist and author
