= Charles W. Upton =

American economist

Charles W. Upton (born August 5, 1943) is an American economist.

In 1974, Upton published together with Merton H. Miller a textbook, Macroeconomics: A Neoclassical Introduction (ISBN 0-226-52623-2), which is considered a landmark in modern macroeconomics. The book was the first to put the neoclassical growth model at center stage, and the first place that in print discussed what has later become known as Ricardian Equivalence. Written at the very dawn of the rational expectations–market-clearing revolution in macroeconomic theory, yet it provides a deeper understanding of those ideas than most contemporary texts. The textbook also makes a radical break with IS-LM model and proposes an operationalizable alternative. Similar to the way macroeconomic practice has evolved, much of the discussion in the book is built around a computer simulation model. The computer simulation model resembles a deterministic version of a simple business cycle model.

Upton completed his undergraduate degree at Rice University and his Ph.D. at Carnegie Mellon University. He has held faculty positions at the University of Chicago, Rutgers University, and Kent State University.
