= Upton Cheyney =

Village in Gloucestershire, England

Coordinates: 51.427°N 2.443°W

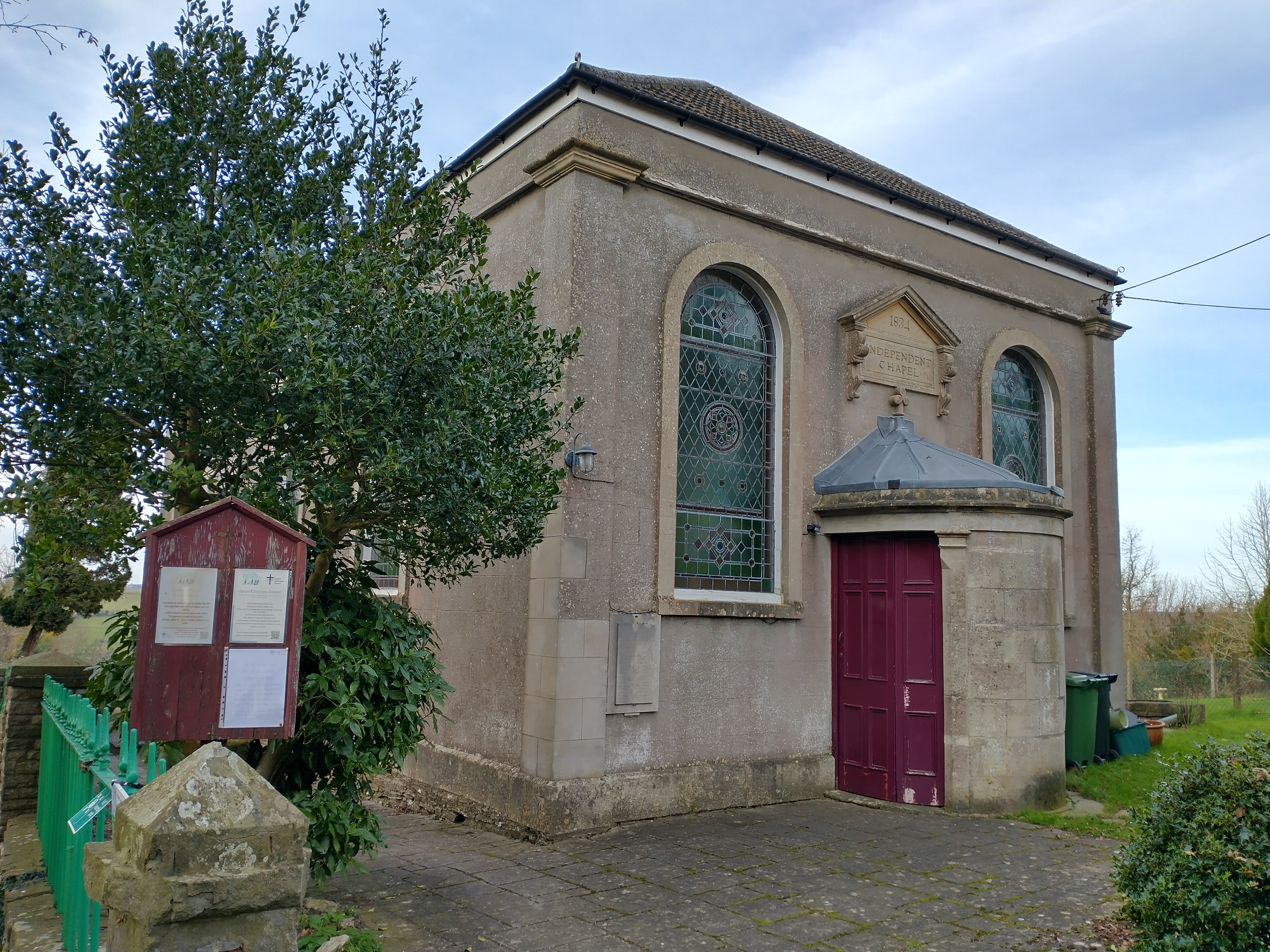
- Upton Cheyney United Reformed Church

- Location within Gloucestershire
- Population: 140
- OS grid reference: ST6969
- Unitary authority: South Gloucestershire
- Ceremonial county: Gloucestershire
- Region: South West
- Country: England
- Sovereign state: United Kingdom
- Police: Avon and Somerset
- Fire: Avon
- Ambulance: South Western
- UK Parliament: North East Somerset and Hanham

Upton Cheyney is a village near to Bitton and Bristol in South Gloucestershire, England, in the parish of Bitton. It has a population of about 140 in 60 households. Upton Cheyney was designated as a conservation area on 24 October 1983.

The name Upton Cheyney is thought to be derived from 'upper farmhouse'. Most of the buildings in the village were built between 1690 and 1830.

Upton Cheyney United Reformed Church was established in 1834 as Upton Cheyney Chapel, building on a congregation that met in the home of William Clark, a local farmer. Objectors who believed the parish church in Bitton was adequate had taken out a court injunction blocking the construction, which was eventually overturned by the Court of King's Bench in London. In 1948, the Congregational Union of Gloucestershire and Hertfordshire became the trustees, and in 1966 a covenant was agreed with the Congregational Union of England and Wales which merged into the United Reformed Church in 1972. The chapel closed on 10 September 2023.

In 1849, a school was created at the back of the chapel for about forty local children. In 1894 this was replaced by a separate school with two classrooms built by the local school board, which closed in 1981.
