= The Oversoul Seven Trilogy =

1995 novel by Jane Roberts

- First edition cover
- Author: Jane Roberts
- Language: English
- Genre: Novel
- Publisher: Amber Allen
- Publication date: May 1, 1995
- Publication place: United States
- Media type: Print (Paperback)
- Pages: 560 pp
- ISBN: 1-878424-17-3
- OCLC: 32013335
- Dewey Decimal: 813/.54 20
- LC Class: PS3568.O2387 O93 1995

The Oversoul Seven Trilogy is a 1997 novel by author Jane Roberts. It consists of the three previously published books The Education of Oversoul Seven (1973), The Further Education of Oversoul Seven (1979), and Oversoul Seven and the Museum of Time (1984).

The Oversoul Seven Trilogy is a work of fiction based on the Seth Material. The Seth Material is a series of dictations on what it means to be human, claimed by their author to have been received via trance communications from a multidimensional being named Seth. The Oversoul Seven Trilogy summarizes these teachings in novelized format, and explores the nature of consciousness and reality creation.

== Editions ==
- Amber Allen ISBN 1-878424-17-3 Edition: Paperback; May 1, 1995

== See also ==
- Seth Material
- Bibliography of Jane Roberts
