= Upton, Buckinghamshire =

Hamlet in Buckinghamshire, England

Coordinates: 51.797°N 0.881°W

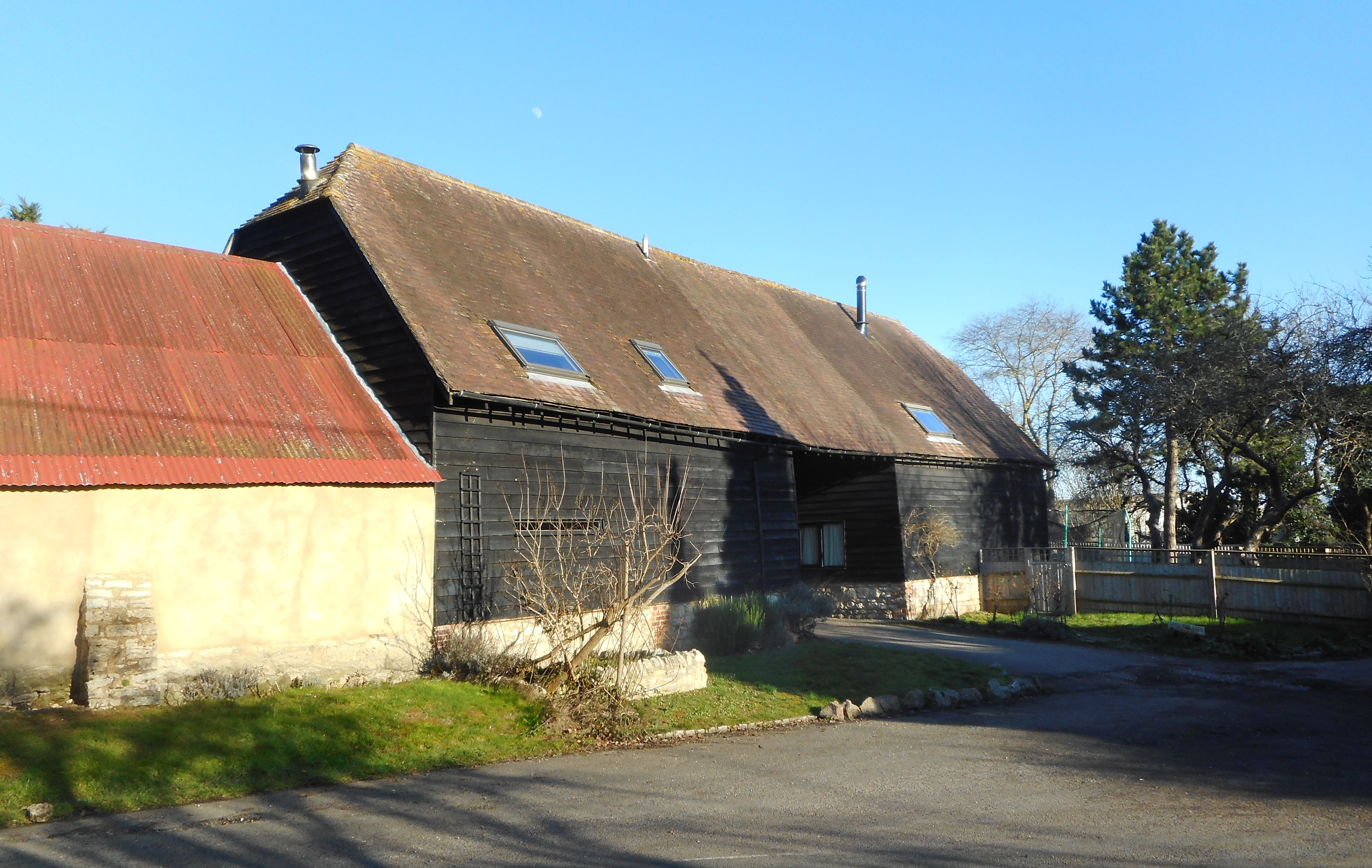

Upton is a hamlet in the civil parish of Dinton-with-Ford and Upton, in Buckinghamshire, England. It is located to the north of the main village of Dinton, on the junction between the new road from Aylesbury to Thame, and the old road before it was rerouted.

The hamlet name is a common one in England, and means 'higher farm', referring in this case to the hamlet's location at the top of an adjacent hill to Dinton.
