= Upton, north Test Valley =

Hamlet in Hampshire, England

Coordinates: 51.29414°N 1.48288°W

Upton
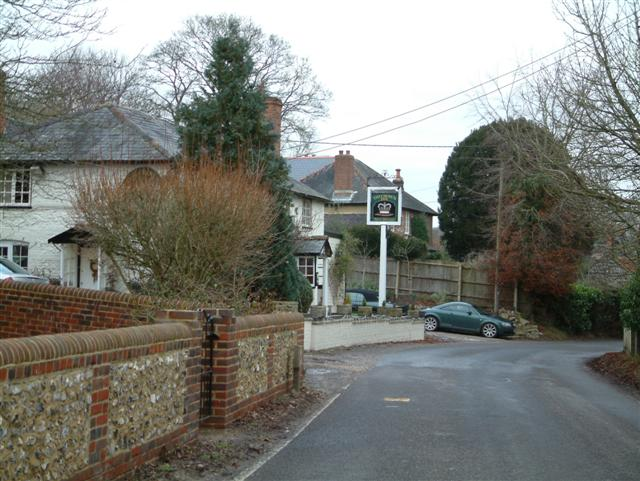

- Location within Hampshire
- OS grid reference: SU360551
- Civil parish: Hurstbourne Tarrant
- District: Test Valley
- Shire county: Hampshire
- Region: South East
- Country: England
- Sovereign state: United Kingdom
- Post town: ANDOVER
- Police: Hampshire and Isle of Wight
- Fire: Hampshire and Isle of Wight
- Ambulance: South Central
- UK Parliament: North West Hampshire

Upton is a hamlet in Hampshire, located approximately 7 miles north of Andover. It has a population of approximately 250. The River Swift, a winterbourne, runs through it and can flood between December and February, causing minor problems. Upton is also the home of the Crown Inn, which is popular with locals and residents in Andover.

== History ==
The earliest known history of Upton is that it formed part of the tithings of Queen Edith, wife of Edward the Confessor, and then passed to William the Conqueror upon her death in 1075. Upton is recorded in the Domesday book as having five villagers, three smallholders and one slave. In 1198 the hamlet was divided into two separate parishes by Henry II, half went to John de Lyons in the parish of Hurstbourne and half went to Henry de Bernevall in the parish of Vernhams Dean. This division remains today, with the border between the two parish councils irregularly placed through the middle of the hamlet.

There has never been a church in Upton, although an Independent Chapel was built in 1839. Allegedly, several "village champions" were converted by Thomas Russell, a primitive Methodist preacher in 1831. The chapel still remains, and is occasionally used as an art gallery.

Upton has historically been formed of four farms: Parsonage, Soper's, Upton and Oriel College. In 1956 a large fire destroyed Soper's farm yard, including its thatched barn and two thatched cottages. The fire also destroyed a cob wall surrounding Oriel College, although this was later rebuilt. Of the three remaining large farm barns, only that at Oriel is still thatched, with Parsonage being replaced by metal sheet some time after 1984, and it is probable the same happened for Upton in 1983.

In 1911 there were two pubs in the hamlet, "The Crook and Shears" and "The Crown Inn", both now closed.

Until 1990 there was a Post Office in the Village and until 1944 there was a small village school, built c.1840. Both are now converted into housing.

A smithy existed in the hamlet until some time after the Second World War.

The largest extension of Upton came after the Second World War, when several houses were built on "Hillside", on the road heading to Andover. This is common of most villages and Hamlets.

== Today ==
There are 23 Grade Two listed buildings within Upton, most of which are built in the vernacular brick and flint style. Additionally, there are twelve unlisted historic buildings, three of which are thatched and at least one that formerly was. Thatched roofs are common in the hamlet, two of these burnt down in 2011 and 2013, but are both now rebuilt. In addition to thatched houses, there are six thatched outer buildings. There remain two cob walls, one of which is thatched; most other walls are flint and brick.

Upton boasts an original Gilbert Scott-designed telephone box in the middle of the village, now converted to be a defibrillator. There is also a letter box in the wall of the original Post Office.

Although most residents are no longer employed as agricultural workers, two of the farms are still working and much of the surrounding countryside is in agricultural use.
