= Upton, Warwickshire =

Village in Warwickshire, England

Coordinates: 52.21558°N 1.81846°W

Upton is a village in south-west Warwickshire, England. It is just off the A46, between Alcester and Stratford-upon-Avon, about a mile east of Alcester.

== History ==
The manor of Upton was held soon after the Norman Conquest by the Botilers of Wem and Oversley, who held under the Earls of Warwick. Later it was held of Sir William Gascoigne as part of his manor of Oversley. In the 13th century, the manor was owned by Roger Lyvet (Levett) de Opton (Upton), in whose family the manors of Upton and Haselor descended for several generations. Henry Lyvet was the chief taxpayer in Haselor in 1332. Later, lord of the manor passed from the Lyvet family to the Whittington family, when Joan Lyvet, daughter of Robert Lyvet, carried the manor to Sir William Whittington on their marriage. The house is still being used as a home. Upton is now within the parish of Haselor.
