= Upton, Cumbria =

Hamlet in Cumbria, England

Coordinates: 54.645°N 3.547°W

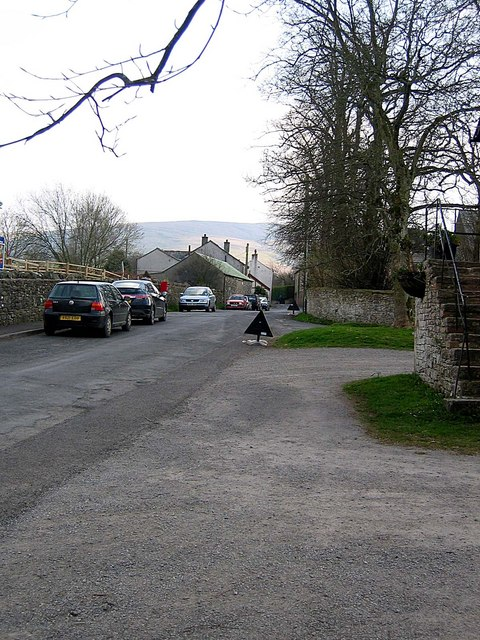
Village street

Upton is a hamlet in the civil parish of Caldbeck, in the Cumberland district, in the county of Cumbria, England.
