= Upton, Lincolnshire =

Village in Lincolnshire, England

Coordinates: 53°22′16″N 0°41′47″W

Upton
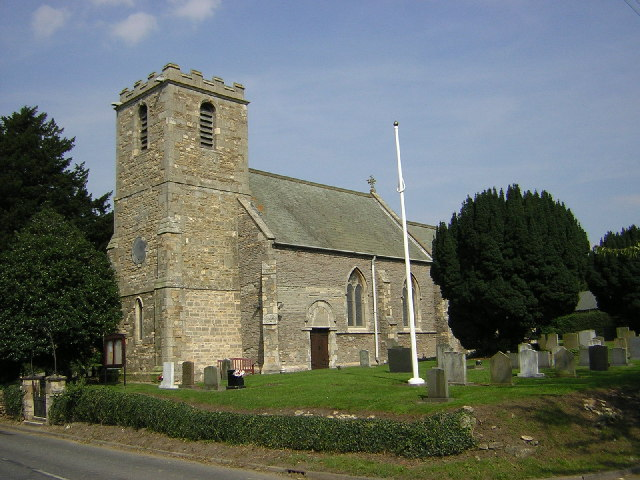
- All Saints' Church, Upton

- Location within Lincolnshire
- Population: 456 (2011)
- OS grid reference: SK868867
  - London: 135 mi (217 km) S
- District: West Lindsey
- Shire county: Lincolnshire
- Region: East Midlands
- Country: England
- Sovereign state: United Kingdom
- Post town: GAINSBOROUGH
- Postcode district: DN21
- Police: Lincolnshire
- Fire: Lincolnshire
- Ambulance: East Midlands
- UK Parliament: Gainsborough

Upton is a small village and civil parish in the West Lindsey district of Lincolnshire, England. The population of the civil parish at the 2011 census was 456. It is geographically situated 3 miles (5 km) south-east from Gainsborough.
