= Upton, Bexley =

Coordinates: 51.451972°N 0.127152°E

Upton
- Location within Greater London
- OS grid reference: TQ479747
- London borough: Bexley
- Ceremonial county: Greater London
- Region: London
- Country: England
- Sovereign state: United Kingdom
- Post town: BEXLEYHEATH
- Postcode district: DA6
- Dialling code: 020
- Police: Metropolitan
- Fire: London
- Ambulance: London
- UK Parliament: Bexleyheath and Crayford
- London Assembly: Bexley and Bromley

Upton was a hamlet in the southwest of today's Bexleyheath in the London Borough of Bexley, in the historic county of Kent. (Note: Few regional maps show Upton today. It is not a parish. It is seldom used in local government ward names, and when doing so is a vague, greater allusion.) (Note: A description of 1797 of Bexley includes in Bexley "the several seats of Lamienby, Blendon, and Danson, and the several small hamlets of Hurst, Halfway-street, Bridgen, Blendon, Upton, and Welling...and among the woods, at the western extremity, that of Blacksen, the manor of which...the seats of Mount and Dale Mascal; and...Hallplace".)

Originally, it was on fertile, south- and west-facing slopes, below the main heathland/pasture of the parish of Bexley. As the town known as Bexleyheath arose during the late 19th century and in early half of the next century, Upton became absorbed into it.

In 1860, Red House, the elegant brick and tile home designed by Philip Webb for William Morris, was built on the heath in Upton. Red House is now preserved by the National Trust.

From 1887 to 1978, it was heavily associated with a hospital on Upton Road. The building was still there in 2019.

== Gallery ==
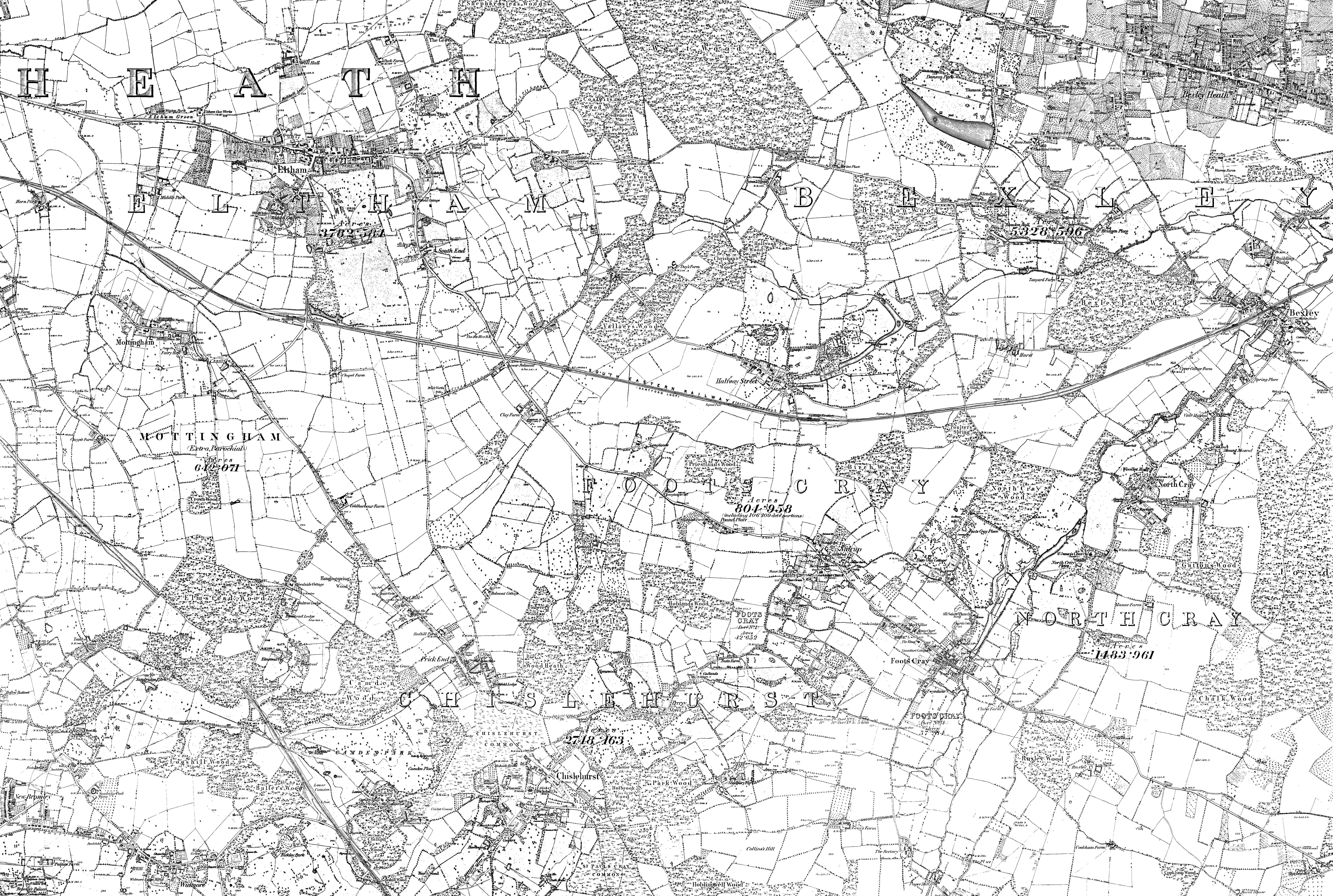
Upton in the much larger parish of Bexley, Ordnance_Survey: Map of Kent, Sheet 8, a work compiled between 1869 and 1882. Click to widen and/or magnify.
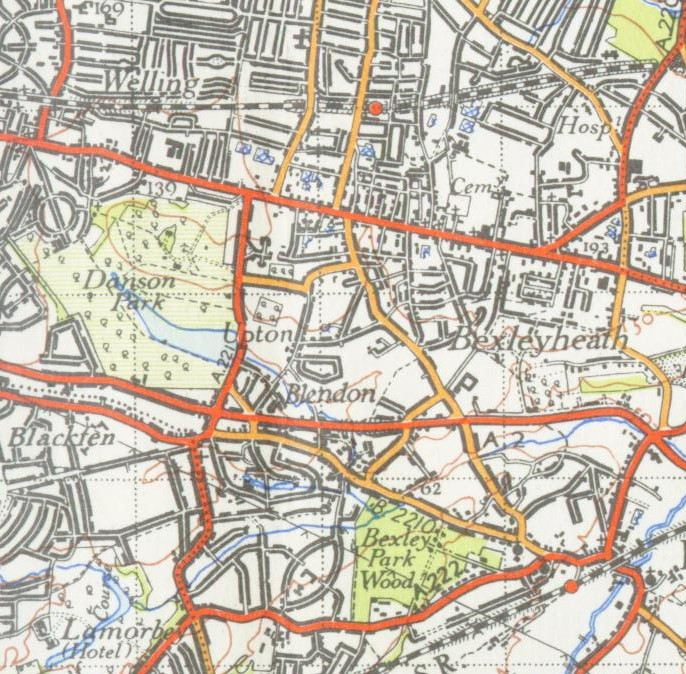
1945 Ordnance Survey map showing Upton to the right (east) of Danson Park.
