= Charles Upton (poet) =

American poet and esotericist (born 1948)

- Born: December 13, 1948 (age 77); San Francisco
- Occupations: Poet, writer, and esotericist

Charles Upton (born December 13, 1948) is an American poet and esotericist.

== Life ==
Born in San Francisco, Charles Upton grew up in Marin County, California. He attended Catholic schools. He attended UC Davis for four days, but left as the Counterculture was more interesting to him.

== Career ==
In San Francisco, Upton met the poet Lew Welch, who became his mentor. Welch helped him publish his first two volumes of poetry, Panic Grass and Time Raid with City Lights when he was 19 years old. Although he is much younger than most of the Beat poets, scholars still count him among their number because of these first two volumes of poetry.

After his first two volumes of poems were published, Upton became involved with the Sanctuary Movement for Central American refugees. He produced and distributed a video, Through the Needle's Eye, containing testimonies of refugees.

In the late 1980s he was briefly involved with the "magical populism" of the New Age peace movement. He studied group dreamwork and dream networking.

Under his wife's influence, Upton became interested in the metaphysics of the Traditionalist or Perennialist School (the followers of Rene Guenon, Ananda Coomaraswamy, Jean-Louis Michon and Frithjof Schuon). In 1988 he joined a traditional Sufi order. He continues to be identified with this Traditionalist school.

His papers are held at University of Connecticut.

== Activism ==
In 2013 Charles Upton conceived of The Covenants Initiative, based on the book The Covenants of the Prophet Muhammad with the Christians of the World by his colleague Dr. John Andrew Morrow. The Covenants Initiative urges Muslims to abide by the covenants concluded between Muhammad and the Christian communities of his time. Upton and Morrow joined a panel at the seventh Parliament of the World's Religions at Toronto in November, 2018 to speak about the covenants and the initiative. Also in November, 2018, the covenants and the book The Covenants of the Prophet Muhammad with the Christians of the World were cited at length by the Supreme Court of Pakistan in their decision to acquit the Christian woman Asia Bibi on charges of blasphemy.

== Marriage and family ==
Upton married fellow poet Jennifer Doane. They lived in a house a block away from where Upton grew up in Marin County, California for many years. They currently live in Lexington, Kentucky.

== Reception ==
Reviewing The Virtues of the Prophet for the journal Philosophy East and West in January 2010, Muhammad Ahsen notes that Upton (who is a traditionalist) only makes passing reference to the modern era, which the author describes as a source of evil, whereas the reviewer suggests that given the example set by the Prophet Muhammad, the Muslim has nothing to fear about modernity. The reviewer also queries Upton's "treatment of evil, with which the Commanding Self (Nafs Ammara) seems to be equated." The reviewer instead suggests that we might look upon the Commanding Self – our human impulses – as "ethically and religiously neutral", "by themselves neither good nor evil". The reviewer "admires Upton's love for the Prophet and understands his commitment to Sufism", but concludes that "a systematic and analytic treatment of this issue along with a classical approach to exegeses of Qur'anic verses would have greatly enhanced the scope of this work."

Going on to review Reflections of Tasawwuf, Ahsen concludes that "[the] book represents a popular trend nowadays in the understanding of Sufism and Islam, but it has to be said that it has little connection with orthodox Islam or with a careful philosophical analysis of either Islam or Sufism. Nonetheless, readers will find much to reflect on in the author's comments and poems, and his attractive style does manage to make the book palatable to read, albeit not so easy to analyze."

Writing about The Words of God to Prophet Muhammad, in the American Journal of Islam and Society in 2017, Shabbir A. Abbas is critical of the third and final part of the book which consists of commentaries on the preceding sayings (aḥādīth), by Upton (who is also a Sufi mystic). He is of the opinion that "Although rather alluring, these commentaries prolong the work unnecessarily. When combined with the Arabic and Morrow’s translation, the text becomes rather long-winded," and that, the sayings being "rather lengthy and advisory in nature, not to mention self-explanatory, there is little need to try and derive any esoteric meaning for them." (Note: For more information about taʾwīl, a symbolic and allegorical form of interpretation of the "deeper" or "hidden" meanings of the Quran and the hadiths (sayings) attributed to the Islamic prophet Muhammad, see: Sookhdeo, Patrick (Winter 2006). "Issues of Interpreting the Koran and Hadith". Connections. 5 (3). Partnership for Peace Consortium of Defense Academies and Security Studies Institutes: 57–81. doi:10.11610/Connections.05.3.06. JSTOR 26323255.)

Reacting to Upton's YouTube video entitled "The Psychic and Spiritual Dangers of AI", Carlos Perona Calvete wrote in The European Conservative that "this video provides the most thorough understanding of AI and contemporary 'big data' crunching technology from a spiritual perspective I have encountered" and calling it "a delineation of relevant concepts so penetrating as to deserve canonical status in the analysis of, and resistance to, the denaturing developments of post-modern global civilization."

== Works ==
- Panic Grass (epic poem) City Lights Books, 1968; ASIN B001FSYIPE
- Time Raid, (poems) Four Seasons Foundation, 1968; ASIN B0006BVUOS
- Doorkeeper of the Heart, Versions of Rabi’a (poems), Threshold Books, 1988; Pir Press, 2004; ISBN 1-879708-20-5
- Hammering Hot Iron: A Spiritual Critique of Bly’s Iron John (metaphysics and social criticism), Quest Books, 1993; Sophia Perennis 2005; ISBN 1-59731-043-3
- The System of Antichrist: Truth and Falsehood in Postmodernism and the New Age (metaphysics and social criticism), Sophia Perennis, 2001; ISBN 0-900588-30-6
- Legends of the End: Prophesies of the End Times, Antichrist, Apocalypse, and Messiah from Eight Religious Traditions, Sophia Perennis, 2005; ISBN 1-59731-025-5
- Cracks in the Great Wall: UFOs and Traditional Metaphysics, Sophia Perennis, 2005; ISBN 1-59731-024-7
- The Virtues of the Prophet: A Young Muslim's Guide to the Greater Jihad, the War Against the Passions, Sophia Perennis, 2006; ISBN 1-59731-051-4
- Knowings, in the Arts of Metaphysics, Cosmology and the Spiritual Path, Sophia Perennis, 2008; ISBN 978-1-59731-074-1
- Reflections of Tasawwuf: Essays, Poems and Narrative on Sufi Themes, Sophia Perennis, 2008; ISBN 978-1-59731-078-9
- Who Is the Earth? How to See God in the Natural World, Sophia Perennis, 2008; ISBN 978-1-59731-079-6
- Folk Metaphysics: Mystical Meanings in Traditional Folk Songs and Spirituals, Sophia Perennis, 2008 ISBN 978-1-59731-077-2
- Shadow of the Rose: The Esoterism of the Romantic Tradition (with his wife Jennifer Doane Upton), Sophia Perennis, 2008; ISBN 978-1-59731-079-6
- Findings in Metaphysic, Path and Lore, With a Response to the Traditionalist/Perennialist School, Sophia Perennis, 2010; ISBN 978-1-59731-096-3
- The Science of the Greater Jihad: Essays in Principal Psychology, Sophia Perennis, 2011; ISBN 978-1-59731-128-1
- The Wars of Love and Other Poems, with "A Reader's Guide to The Wars of Love" and "Lew Welch as Teacher", Sophia Perennis, 2011; ISBN 978-1-59731-125-0
- Vectors of the Counter-Initiation: The Course and Destiny of Inverted Spirituality, Sophia Perennis, 2012; ISBN 978-1-59731-132-8
- Day and Night on the Sufi Path, Sophia Perennis, 2015; ISBN 978-1-62138-135-8
- The Words of God to Prophet Muhammad: Forty Sacred Sayings, 2015; ISBN 978-1-87103-190-4
- What Poets Used to Know: Poetics, Mythopoesis, Metaphysics, Angelico Press/Sophia Perennis, 2016; ISBN 978-1-59731-171-7
- Dugin against Dugin: A Traditionalist Critique of the Fourth Political Theory, Reviviscimus, 2018; ISBN 978-1-59731-219-6
- The Alien Disclosure Deception: The Metaphysics of Social Engineering, Sophia Perennis, 2021; ISBN 978-1-59731-184-7
- The Way Forward for Perennialism, After the Antinomianism of Frithjof Schuon, Sophia Perennis, 2022; ISBN 978-1-59731-185-4
- Giving Myself Away: From Beat Protégé to Metaphysical Social Critic, a Cultural History of America through Fifty Years of Spiritual Seeking, Angelico Press, 2025; ISBN 979-8-89280-126-3 (paper); ISBN 979-8-89280-127-0 (cloth)

=== Editor ===
- Because You Talk: An Anthology of Bay Area Poets ed. Charles Upton, Robert Starfire, Hans Steinkellner, Other Voices Literary Society, 1976; ISBN 978-0-91651-806-6
- Dark Way to Paradise: Dante's Inferno in Light of the Spiritual Path, Jennifer Doane Upton, Sophia Perennis, 2005; ISBN 978-1-59731-009-3
- False Dawn: The United Religions Initiative, Globalism and the Quest for a One-World Religion, Lee Penn, Sophia Perennis, 2005; ISBN 1-59731-000-X
- The Ordeal of Mercy: Dante's Purgatorio in Light of the Spiritual Path, Jennifer Doane Upton, Angelico Press/Sophia Perennis, 2015; ISBN 978-1-62138-160-0

=== Anthologies ===
- Because You Talk: An Anthology of Bay Area Poets ed. Charles Upton, Robert Starfire, Hans Steinkellner, Other Voices Literary Society, 1976; ISBN 978-0-91651-806-6
- Mark in Time, Glide Publications, 1971; ISBN 0-912078-16-2
- Excerpt from Panic Grass in City Lights Pocket Poets Anthology, Lawrence Ferlinghetti (ed.), City Lights Books, 1995; ISBN 978-0-87286-311-8
- Diamond Cutters: Visionary Poets in America, Britain and Oceania, Andrew Harvey and Jay Ramsay (ed.), Tayen Lane Publications, 2016; ISBN 978-0997019612 (hardcover), ISBN 978-1944505394 (paperback)

=== Journal articles ===
- Upton, Charles (2009). "Homer, Poet of Maya". Eye of the Heart (4). La Trobe University: 87–96.

== See also ==
- Esoteric interpretation of the Quran
