= Debenham (disambiguation) =

Debenham is a large village and civil parish in the Mid Suffolk district of Suffolk in Eastern England.

Debenham may also refer to:

== Business ==
- Debenhams, the original British department store chain that operated from 1813 to 2021
- Debenhams Group, the group that formerly traded as Boohoo Group plc
- Debenhams (online retailer), the online retailer established in 2021
- Debenhams (Middle East), the department store chain in the Middle East, trading since 1997

== Places ==
- Debenham Islands, Antarctica
- Debenham Glacier, Antarctica
- Debenham Peak, Antarctica
- Debenham House, located in Holland Park, West London, England

== People ==
- Debenham baronets
- Alison Debenham (1903–1967), British artist
- Ben Debenham (born 1967), English cricket umpire
- Betty and Nancy Debenham (born c. 1906), British motorcyclists
- Christopher Debenham (born 1953), English cricketer
- Ernest Debenham (1865–1952), English businessman and politician
- Frank Debenham (1883–1965), English-Australian geographer
- Gilbert Debenham (1432–1500), English knight, politician and soldier
- Nigel Debenham (fl.1978–1989), New Zealand footballer
- William Debenham (1794–1863), English businessman and founder of Debenhams

=== Fictional ===
- Mary Debenham, governess in Agatha Christie's novel Murder on the Orient Express

== Other uses ==
- Debenhams Cup, English football cup from 1977 to 1978
- Debenham LC F.C., located in Debenham, Suffolk
