= Debenham baronets =

Title in the Baronetage of the United Kingdom

- Escutcheon of the Debenham baronets of Bladen
- Creation date: 28 January 1931
- Creation: Sir Ernest Debenham
- Peerage: Baronetage of the UK
- Baronetage: County of Dorset
- First holder: Sir Ernest Debenham
- Last holder: Sir Gilbert Debenham
- Heir apparent: Sir Thomas Debenham
- Heir presumptive: Oliver William Debenham
- Remainder to: heirs male (Heirs male of the body)
- Status: dormant since 2001
- Extinction date: 2001

The Debenham Family
- Parent family: Debenham (/ˈdɛbənəm/)
- Current region: County of Dorset
- Origin: Alpheton, Suffolk, England
- Current head: Sir Thomas Adam Debenham
- Final head: Sir Piers Kenrick Debenham
- Members: William Debenham (1794–1863); William Debenham Jnr; Ernest Debenham (1865–1952); Piers Debenham (1904–1964); Alison Debenham (1903-1967); Gilbert Debenham (1906–2001); Thomas Debenham (b.1971); Oliver Debenham (b 1976)
- Estates: The Bladen Estate; Debenham House

The Debenham Baronetcy, of Bladen in the County of Dorset, is a title in the Baronetage of the United Kingdom. It was created on 28 January 1931 for Ernest Debenham, Chairman of Debenhams Ltd.

As of 2026 the presumed baronet has not proved his succession and does not appear on the Official Roll of the Baronets. The Baronetcy has been considered dormant since 2001.

== Debenham baronets, of Bladen (1931) ==
- Sir Ernest Ridley Debenham, 1st Baronet (1865–1952)
- Sir Piers Kenrick Debenham, 2nd Baronet (1904–1964)
- Sir Gilbert Ridley Debenham, 3rd Baronet (1906–2001)
- Sir Thomas Adam Debenham, presumed 4th Baronet (born 1971). His name does not appear on the Official Roll, which marks the baronetcy dormant.

The heir apparent to the baronetcy is Alfred Dino Debenham (born 2004), son of the presumed 4th Baronet.
