= Katharine Butler =

British businesswoman

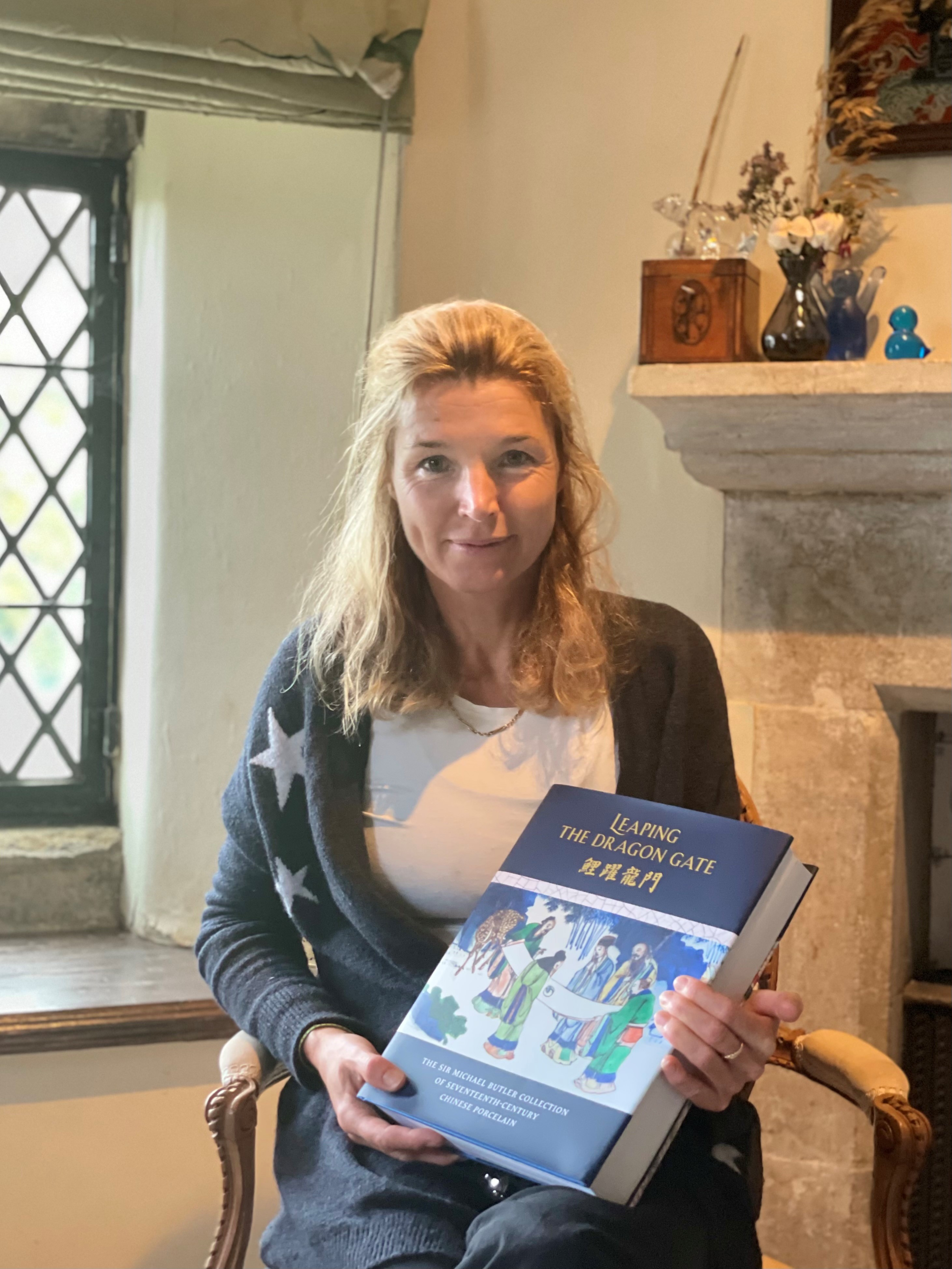
- Born: November 1967 (age 58); London, England
- Education: Edinburgh University
- Occupations: Businesswoman, art historian
- Spouse: Sebastian Pawlowski (divorced)
- Partner: Kyril, Prince of Preslav
- Children: 1
- Parent(s): Sir Michael Butler; Ann Clyde

Katharine Jibba Butler (born November 1967) is a British businesswoman and art historian.

== Early life ==
Butler was born in London in November 1967. She is the daughter of British diplomat Sir Michael Butler and Ann Clyde, the daughter of James Latham Clyde, Lord Clyde. Through her mother she is also a great-granddaughter of James Avon Clyde, Lord Clyde and Peter Wallwork Latham. She grew up in Geneva, New York City, and Brussels. Her parents separated in 1997.

== Career ==
Butler studied art history at the University of Edinburgh. She operated retail and importing businesses in the Czech Republic, including Sparkys, a chain of toyshops including a multi-story toy store in Prague. She also founded and ran a distribution company including baby products Chicco from Italy and own brand Loap's clothing. In 2015 she sold her businesses for 15 million euros.

She later developed Freebike, a bike rental company based in London, with her brother, Charles. She has also been working alongside Charles to reopen a museum including her father's Chinese porcelain collection. In 2021 Katharine published a book "Leaping The Dragon Gate". This book celebrates the most important collection of 17th-century Chinese porcelain in the world, assembled by her father, the distinguished Sir Michael Butler.

== Personal life ==
Butler was married to Swiss businessman Sebastian Pawlowski. They later divorced. She and Pawlowski have one son.

She lives in Waterston Manor, a 17th-century country house in Puddletown, Dorset.

In 2017 Butler began a relationship with Kyril, Prince of Preslav (the second son of Simeon II of Bulgaria), who is separated from his wife, Rosario, Princess of Preslav.
