= Affpuddle =

Village in Dorset, England

Coordinates: 50.7418°N 2.2762°W

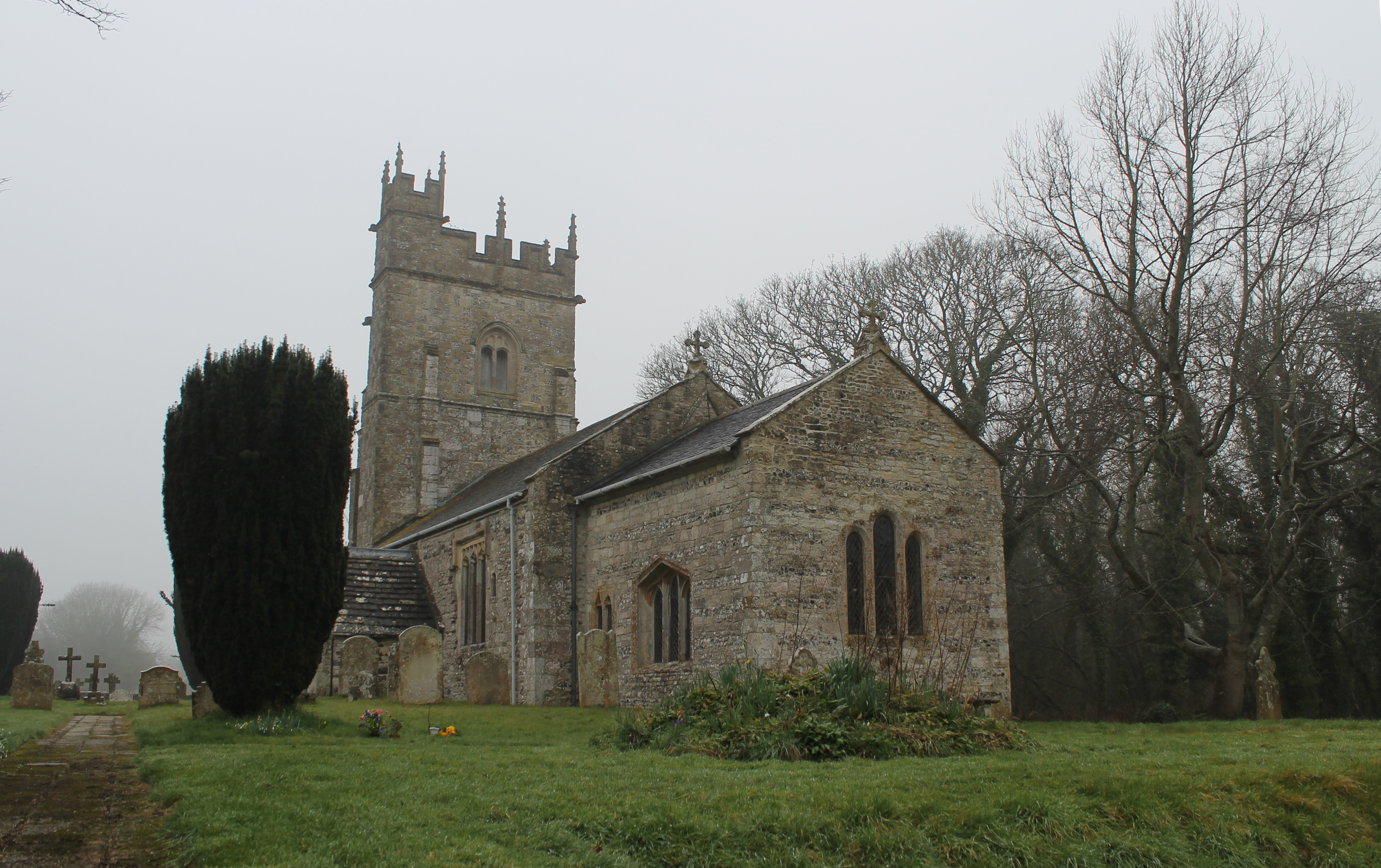
- Parish church of St Laurence

- Location within Dorset
- Population: 402 (2001 Census)
- OS grid reference: SY807935
  - London: 121 miles (195 km)
- Civil parish: Affpuddle and Turnerspuddle
- Unitary authority: Dorset
- Ceremonial county: Dorset
- Region: South West
- Country: England
- Sovereign state: United Kingdom
- Post town: DORCHESTER
- Postcode district: DT2
- Dialling code: 01305
- Police: Dorset
- Fire: Dorset and Wiltshire
- Ambulance: South Western
- UK Parliament: South Dorset
- Website: www.affpuddle.co.uk

Affpuddle is a small village and former civil parish, now in the parish of Affpuddle and Turnerspuddle, in the Dorset district of the ceremonial county of Dorset, England, 9 miles (14 km) east of Dorchester. The local travel links are 3 miles (4.8 km) from the village to Moreton railway station and 20 miles (32 km) to Bournemouth Airport. Part of the village street is the B3390, which divides the village into two. Affpuddle parish included the settlements of Briantspuddle to the east and Pallington to the south. In the 2001 census this parish had a population of 402. On 1 April 2010 the parish was abolished and merged with Turners Puddle to form "Affpuddle & Turnerspuddle". In the 2011 census this joint parish had 200 households and a population of 436.

Affpuddle village is in the Piddle valley, just north of the Purbeck conifer plantations and heathland, in a valley beside the villages of Tolpuddle and Puddletown. The village is linear and made of brick, stone and thatched cottages and has a 13th-century church dedicated to St Laurence.

== History ==
The village was established during or before the Saxon era, and was mentioned in the Domesday Book as Affapidela, having a manor house belonging to the Abbot of Cerne. After the Dissolution the village became an estate of the Lawrence family, an ancestor of whom married the heiress of a branch of the Washington family, from another branch of which descended George Washington. The Washington arms was quartered by the Lawrences and thus appears on the north wall of the chancel in the village church on a Lawrence monument. The church of St Laurence is noted for its elaborate pews, dated 1545 or 1547, and the finely carved pulpit, undated but in a very similar style. The church dates from the 13th century but was enlarged by an aisle and a tower in the 15th century. Other features of interest are the Norman font and south doorway.

The earliest records in Dorset of the agricultural practice of flooding fields to form watermeadows refer to Affpuddle in the early 17th century; Edward Lawrence, the lord of the manor at the time, was interested in agricultural improvement and favoured the use of flooding here and in neighbouring Briantspiddle and Pallington, where he also had manors.

The village later belonged to the Framptons of Moreton, noted for their involvement with the Tolpuddle Martyrs. John Lock who gave key evidence against them also lived in the village.
