= Waterston Manor =

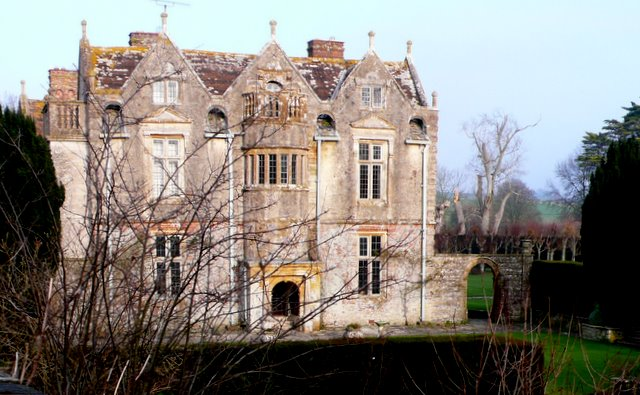
- Waterston Manor

- Location in Dorset
- 50.7559°N 2.3766°W
- Location: Waterston, Puddletown, Dorset, England
- OS grid reference: SY 73529 95207

History
- Built: 17th Century
- Rebuilt: 1863

Site notes
- Restored: 1911

Listed Building – Grade I
- Designated: 26 January 1956
- Reference no.: 1119080

Waterston Manor, Puddletown, Dorset is a manor house with 17th century origins, that was extensively rebuilt after a fire in 1863 and remodelled in 1911. The manor was the inspiration for Weatherbury Farm in Thomas Hardy's novel, Far from the Madding Crowd. It is a Grade I listed building.

== History ==
The house was built in the early 17th century, when the manor was owned by the Earls of Suffolk. In 1641, it was sold to Sir John Strangways. It remained in the possession of the Strangways, who in 1756 became Earls of Ilchester, until 1911 when it was sold to Captain Gerald Carter.

The gardens were laid out by Percy Richard Morley Horder when he undertook remodelling of the house in 1911.

The house was Hardy's inspiration for Weatherbury Farm in his novel Far From the Madding Crowd.

It is now owned by Katharine Butler, who, along with her siblings, was involved in a lengthy court case regarding the Chinese porcelain collection assembled by their father, diplomat Sir Michael Butler.

== Description ==
The house is of two storeys, with an attic, and is constructed of ashlar and brick. The south front remains predominantly of 17th century construction, while the east front dates from the 19th century rebuilding following the fire. The interiors are almost entirely of the 19th and 20th centuries.

The gate piers, the stables, and some of the garden walls have their own Grade II listings.

== Sources ==
- Newman, John; Pevsner, Nikolaus (2002). Dorset. The Buildings of England. New Haven and London: Yale University Press. ISBN 0-300-09598-8.
- Bullen, J.B. (2013). Thomas Hardy: The World of His Novels. Frances Lincoln. ISBN 978-0-7112-3275-4.
