= What the Butler Saw (TV series) =

2004 British television series

What the Butler Saw is a short-lived British reality show that was based on the short-lived American reality show called The Family from 2003, that ran on Channel 4 from 11 November until 16 December 2004. It features the Callaghan extended family. The nine relatives are competing to move from lower class to the best example of nobility. The family knows they are being judged, but do not realize that the judges are the seven servants helping them through their new life.

The series was filmed at Debenham House in London's Holland Park district.
