= River Piddle =

River in Dorset, England

River Piddle River Trent
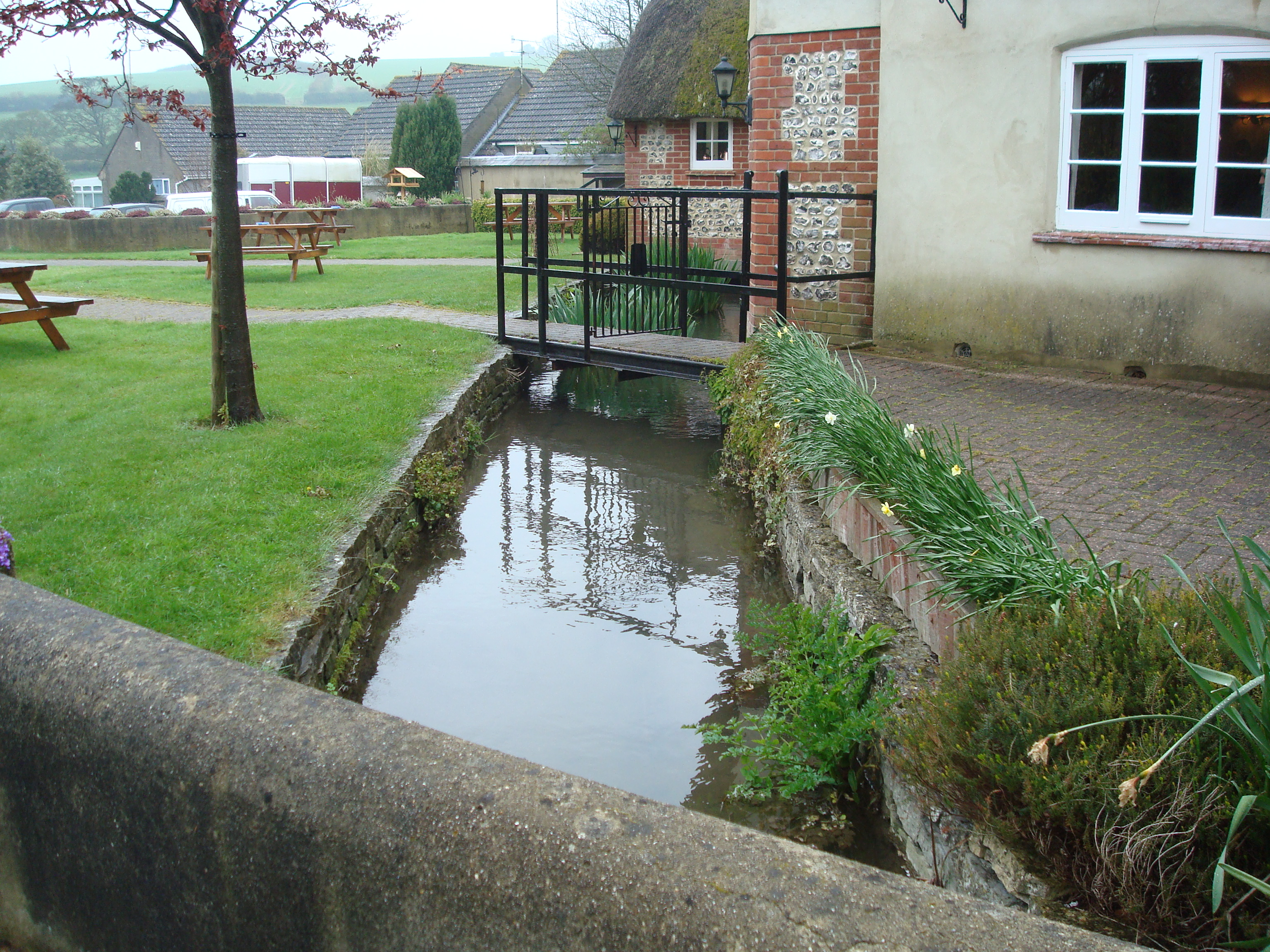
- The River Piddle at Piddlehinton

- Location within Dorset

Location
- Country: England
- County: Dorset
- Towns and villages: Wareham, Tolpuddle, Puddletown, Piddletrenthide

Physical characteristics
- Source: Alton Pancras
  - location: Dorset
- Mouth
  - location: Poole Harbour, Dorset
  - coordinates: 50.6941°N 2.0788°W
- Discharge
  - location: Poole Harbour

Basin features
- Tributaries
  - left: Bere Stream, Devil's Brook

The River Piddle or Trent or North River is a small rural Dorset river which rises in the Dorset Downs and flows into Poole Harbour near Wareham.

== Etymology ==
The river's name has Germanic origins and has had various spellings over the years. In AD 966 it was called the 'Pidelen', and on the church tower at Piddletrenthide—the first village to which it gives its name—it is spelled 'Pydel'. Several villages which the river passes through are named after it: as well as Piddletrenthide there are Piddlehinton, Puddletown, Tolpuddle, Affpuddle, Briantspuddle and Turnerspuddle. Local legend tells that the Victorians changed the spelling to 'Puddle', due to 'piddle' being a slang term for 'urine' (although Puddletown was still called Piddletown into the 1950s), but see for instance the John Speed map of the county from 1610 which has the name 'Puddletown'.

== Course and characteristics ==
In its upper reaches, the Piddle is a chalk stream flowing south through a steep valley cut into the dip slope of the downland, which is dominated by an agricultural landscape of calcareous grassland pasture and arable fields. It rises above the church in Alton Pancras, which was originally named Awultune, a Saxon name meaning the village at the source of a river.

At Puddletown, 6 miles (9.7 km) south of the source, the chalk dips below clay and alluvial sand and gravel geology with a flatter landscape of water-meadows. Here, the Piddle turns to follow an east-south-easterly direction 12 miles (19 km) to Wareham, where it enters Poole Harbour via Wareham Channel. This section of the river runs more or less parallel with its bigger neighbour, the River Frome, together forming a broad, open valley divided by a low ridge of heathland.

== Cultural references ==
Thomas Hardy was born and raised in a cottage at Higher Bockhampton on the ridge between the Piddle and Frome valleys, and the landscape and villages of the valley were inspiration for many of the places in his stories, including Athelhampton House (Athelhall) and Puddletown (Weatherbury).

The Piddle Valley was the subject of Ogden Nash's poem Paradise For Sale, published in the New Yorker in 1959.

== See also ==
- Rivers of the United Kingdom
- Piddle Brook
