= William Debenham =

British businessman

- Born: 18 April 1794; Alpheton, Suffolk, England
- Died: 24 September 1863 (aged 69); Kensal Rise, London, England
- Citizenship: British
- Occupations: Businessman; Retailer
- Years active: 1813–1863
- Employer: Debenhams Ltd
- Organization: Debenhams
- Known for: Founder of Debenhams plc
- Title: Chair of Debenhams
- Term: 1813–1863
- Successor: William Debenham Jnr
- Spouse: Caroline Freebody (m. 1820)
- Children: six sons; four daughters
- Relatives: Ernest Debenham; Sir Piers Debenham; Alison Debenham
- Website: debenhams.com

William Debenham (/ˈdɛbənəm/; 18 April 1794 – 24 September 1863) was the founder of Debenhams, once one of the largest retailers in the United Kingdom.

== Career ==
Born in 1794 in Alpheton in Suffolk, William Debenham joined Thomas Clark in a partnership to manage a draper's store at 44 Wigmore Street in London.

The partners later expanded the business such that it had stores on both sides of Wigmore Street, one known as Debenham & Clark and the other known as Clark & Debenham. When William Debenham Snr retired a new partnership was formed between his son, William Debenham Jnr, and Clement Freebody. This business became Debenhams, one of the largest retailers in the United Kingdom. William Debenham Snr died in 1863 at Kensal Rise in London.

== Family ==
William married Caroline Freebody in 1820 and together they had six sons and four daughters.

Business positions
Preceded by William Clark	President of Debenhams; 1813–1863	Succeeded by William Debenhams Jnr
Preceded by William Clark	chairman of Debenhams; 1813–1863	Succeeded by William Debenhams Jnr
