= Jude the Obscure =

1895 novel by Thomas Hardy

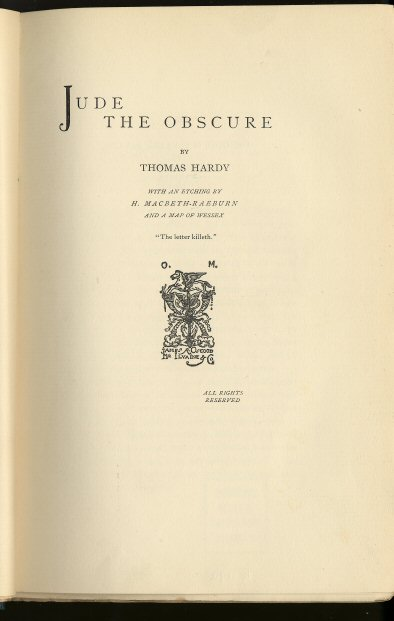
- Original title page of Jude the Obscure
- Author: Thomas Hardy
- Original title: The Simpletons; Hearts Insurgent
- Illustrator: Henry Macbeth-Raeburn
- Language: English
- Genre: Novel
- Set in: Thomas Hardy's Wessex, late 19th century
- Publisher: Osgood, McIlvaine, & Co.
- Publication date: 1 November 1895
- Publication place: United Kingdom
- Dewey Decimal: 823.8
- LC Class: PZ3 .H222
- Preceded by: Tess of the d'Urbervilles
- Followed by: The Well-Beloved
- Text: Jude the Obscure at Wikisource

Jude the Obscure is a novel by Thomas Hardy which began as a magazine serial in December 1894 and was first published in book form in November 1895 (though the title page says 1896). The protagonist, Jude Fawley, is a working-class young man; he is a stonemason who dreams of becoming a scholar. The other main character is his cousin, Sue Bridehead, who is also his central love interest. The novel is concerned in particular with issues of class, education, religion, morality and marriage. It was Hardy's 14th and last published novel.

== Plot summary ==
The novel tells the story of Jude Fawley, who lives in a village in southern England (part of Hardy's fictional county of Wessex). He yearns to be a scholar at "Christminster", a city modelled on Oxford. As a youth, Jude teaches himself Classical Greek and Latin in his spare time, while working first in his great-aunt's bakery, with the hope of entering university. But before he can try to do this, the naive Jude is seduced by Arabella Donn, a rather coarse, morally lax, and superficial local girl who traps him into marriage by pretending to be pregnant. The marriage is a failure, and Arabella leaves Jude and later emigrates to Australia, where she enters into a bigamous marriage.

After Arabella leaves him, Jude moves to Christminster and supports himself as a mason while studying alone, hoping to be able to enter the university later. There, he meets and falls in love with his free-spirited cousin, Sue Bridehead. But, shortly after this, Jude introduces Sue to his former schoolteacher, Mr. Phillotson, who helps her train to be a schoolteacher herself and persuades her to marry him, despite being some 20 years her senior. She soon regrets this, because, in addition to being in love with Jude, she is horrified by the notion of sex with her husband. Sue soon asks Phillotson for permission to leave him for Jude, which he grants, once he realises how unwilling she is to fulfil what he believes are her marital duties to him. Because of this scandal—the fact that Phillotson willingly allows his wife to leave for another man—Phillotson has to give up his career as a schoolmaster.

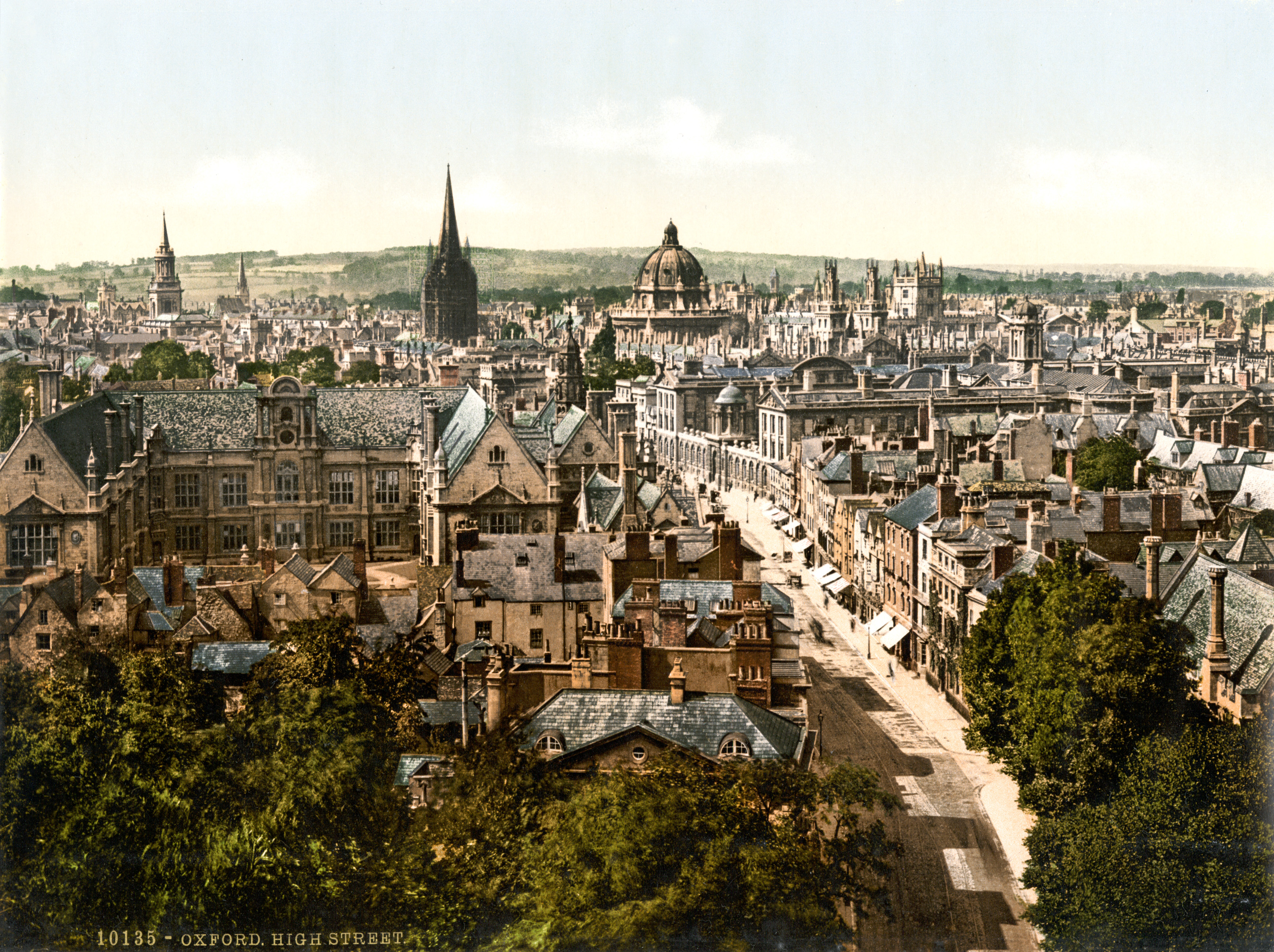
Photochrom of the High Street, Oxford, 1890–1900

Sue and Jude spend some time living together without any sexual relationship. This is because of Sue's dislike for both sex and the institution of marriage. Soon after, Arabella reappears having fled her Australian husband, who managed a hotel in Sydney, and this complicates matters. Arabella and Jude divorce and she legally marries her bigamous husband, while Sue gets a divorce from Phillotson. However, following this, Arabella reveals that she had a child of Jude's, eight months after they separated, and subsequently sends this child to his father. He is named Jude and nicknamed "Little Father Time" because of his intense seriousness.

Jude eventually convinces Sue to sleep with him and, over the years, they have two children together and expect a third. But Jude and Sue are socially ostracised for living together unmarried, especially after the children are born. Jude's employers dismiss him because of the illicit relationship, and the family is forced into a nomadic lifestyle, moving from town to town across Wessex seeking employment and housing before eventually returning to Christminster. Their socially troubled boy, "Little Father Time", comes to believe that he and his half-siblings are the source of the family's woes. The morning after their arrival in Christminster, he kills Sue's two children and himself by hanging. He leaves behind a note that simply reads, "Done because we are too menny [sic]." Shortly thereafter, Sue has a miscarriage.

Overwhelmed with grief and blaming herself for "Little Father Time"'s actions, Sue turns to the church, against which she has rebelled. She comes to believe that the children's deaths were divine retribution for her relationship with Jude. Although horrified at the thought of resuming her marriage with Phillotson, she becomes convinced that, for religious reasons, she should never have left him. Arabella discovers Sue's feelings and informs Phillotson, who soon proposes they remarry. This results in Sue leaving Jude once again for Phillotson, and she punishes herself by allowing her husband sex. Jude is devastated and remarries Arabella, whose husband has died, after she plies him with alcohol to once again trick him into marriage.

After one final, desperate visit to Sue in freezing weather, Jude becomes seriously ill and dies within the year in Christminster, thwarted in his ambitions both in love and in achieving fame in scholarship. It is revealed that Sue has grown "staid and worn" with Phillotson. Arabella does not mourn Jude's passing, instead setting the stage to ensnare her next husband.

== Themes ==
The novel explores several social problems in Victorian England, especially those relating to the institutions of marriage, the Church, and education. These themes are developed in particular through Hardy's use of contrast. For example, at the beginning of their relationship, Jude's Christian faith contrasts with Sue's religious scepticism, a contrast which is heightened even further by their later role-reversal. Although the central characters represent both perspectives, the novel as a whole is firmly critical of Christianity and social institutions in general.

Jude's trajectory through the story sheds light on the ambivalent and conflicting roles of organised religion in his life. Jude, from his origins in Marygreen, always found religion to be the endgame of an otherwise troublesome and uninteresting life. But, as seen through his systematic exclusion from the University of Christminster, Jude's dream of entering the church would prove to be unattainable, leaving him to pursue other, less fulfilling interests. A similar track can be seen in Hardy's treatment of the traditional institution of marriage. From the original pairing of Arabella and Jude to their eventual reunion, Hardy depicts marriage as an oppressive social necessity, propelling the characters into a downward spiral of unhappiness.

Although Hardy claimed that "no book he had ever written contained less of his own life", contemporary reviewers found several parallels between the themes of the novel and Hardy's life as a working-class man of letters. The unhappy marriages, the religious and philosophical questioning, and the social problems dealt with in Jude the Obscure appear in many other Hardy novels, as well as in Hardy's life. The struggle against fixed class boundaries is an important link between the novel and Hardy's life, especially concerning higher education and the working class. Although Jude wishes to attend the university at Christminster, he cannot afford the costs involved in studying for a degree, and he lacks the rigorous training necessary to qualify for a fellowship. He is therefore prevented from gaining economic mobility and getting out of the working class. This theme of unattainable education was personal for Hardy since he, like Jude, had been unable to afford to study for a degree at Oxford or Cambridge, in spite of his early interest in scholarship and the classics. Several specific details about Jude's self-directed studies actually appear in Hardy's autobiography, including late-night Latin readings while working full-time as a stonemason and then as an architect. However, unlike Jude's relatives, Hardy's mother was well-read, and she educated Thomas until he went to his first school at Bockhampton at the age of eight, and he attended school in Dorchester, where he learned Latin and demonstrated academic potential, until he became an apprentice at 16.

Another parallel between the book's characters and themes and Hardy's actual life experience occurs when Sue becomes obsessed with religion after previously having been indifferent and even hostile towards it. Like Sue Bridehead, Hardy's first wife, Emma, went from being free-spirited and fairly indifferent to religion in her youth to becoming obsessively religious as she got older. Since Hardy was always highly critical of organised religion, as Emma became more and more religious, their differing views led to a great deal of tension in their marriage, and this tension was a major factor leading to their increased alienation from one another.

Emma Hardy was also very disapproving of Jude the Obscure, in part because of the book's criticisms of religion, but also because she worried that the reading public would believe that the relationship between Jude and Sue directly paralleled her strained relationship with Hardy (which, in a figurative sense, it did).

== Writing ==
Around 1887, Hardy began making notes for a story about a working man's frustrated attempts to attend the university, perhaps inspired in part by the scholastic failure and suicide of his friend Horace Moule. From December 1894 to November 1895, a bowdlerised version of the novel ran in instalments in Harper's New Monthly Magazine, originally under the title The Simpletons, then Hearts Insurgent. In 1895, the book was published in London under its present title, Jude the Obscure (dated 1896). In his Preface to the first edition, Hardy provides details of the conception and writing history of the novel, claiming that certain details were inspired by the death of a woman (most likely his cousin, Tryphena Sparks) in 1890.

== Reviews ==
Called "Jude the Obscene" by at least one reviewer, Jude the Obscure received a harsh reception from some scandalised critics. Among the critics was Walsham How, Bishop of Wakefield; Hardy later claimed that the bishop had burned a copy. After some years Hardy commented: “After these hostile verdicts from the press, its next misfortune was to be burnt by a bishop – probably in his despair at not being able to burn me.” It has been suggested that negative criticism was the reason that Hardy stopped writing novels after Jude, but the poet C. H. Sisson describes this "hypothesis" as "superficial and absurd".

The novel is No. 23 on the BBC's "The 100 greatest British novels" and No. 20 on The Guardian's "The 100 best novels written in English".

D. H. Lawrence, an admirer of Hardy, was puzzled by the character of Sue Bridehead, and attempted to analyse her conflicted sexuality in his A Study of Thomas Hardy (1914).

At least one recent scholar has postulated that Jude borrowed heavily from an earlier novel, The Wages of Sin by Lucas Malet.

The Marxist Catholic critic Terry Eagleton, in his introduction to a 1974 edition of the text, rebuts the conventional reading of the novel as "the tragedy of an oversexed peasant boy", instead examining the social background of the text and proposing it as a conflict between ideal and reality.

== Adaptations ==
The novel has been adapted into:

- A six-part television serial, Jude the Obscure (1971), directed by Hugh David, starring Robert Powell and Fiona Walker
- A feature film, Jude (1996), directed by Michael Winterbottom, starring Christopher Eccleston and Kate Winslet
- The British playwright Howard Brenton wrote an updated adaptation of the novel, simply titled Jude, which premiered at The Hampstead Theatre in North London in May 2019. In this version, Jude is a free-spirited female Syrian refugee who works as a cleaner, her cousin is a male relative who becomes a radical Muslim, and she is regularly visited by a figure representing the Greek poet Euripides.
- The BBC Radio 4 series "Hardy's Women" (2020) featured a three-part adaptation of Jude the Obscure.
