= Tryphena Sparks =

Tryphena Sparks (20 March 1851 – 17 March 1890), born in Puddletown, Dorset as the youngest child of a cabinet-making journeyman James Sparks and his wife Maria, overcame the barriers of her modest rural background to achieve professional success, becoming headteacher of one of the largest schools outside London. She was a cousin of Thomas Hardy and was romantically involved with him, inspiring a number of his well-known poems.

== Early life and education ==
Sparks attended the British School at Athelhampton, a Congregationalist school founded by Mrs. George Wood of Athelhampton House from the leading non-conformist Vaizey family. A book presented to her in 1862 cites her “attention to her duties” as a monitor teaching younger children. In late 1866, she took the role of a paid pupil-teacher in the Church of England school at Puddletown, founded by John Brymer, described as a vigorous and stern paternalistic squire. After a year of good performance, the log for 16 January 1868 states: “Reproved pupil-teacher for neglect of duty – parents very angry in consequence – determine to withdraw her a month hence,’ and a few days later Mrs. Collins, the headmistress, spoke to the school about the Seventh Commandment, which prohibits adultery, a possible indirect reference to Sparks' relationship with Hardy.

Faced with the loss of a job that would have provided her the experience needed to enter teacher training college and further her career, Sparks received support from a number of women close to her. Her mother "acted in defiance of the Puddletown school.” Miss Elizabeth Samson, a member of the Dorset branch of the British and Foreign Bible Society, hosted by Mrs. George Wood at Athelhampton House, offered her a job as pupil-teacher at the Congregationalist school at Coryates a few miles away on the other side of Dorchester. This was a direct replacement for the role she had lost at Puddletown and allowed her career to continue; it is unclear whether she started straight away or at the beginning of the school year in November 1868.

After the death of Sparks' mother late that year, the Athelhampton group appears to have continued to offer support. Mrs. George Wood's niece was Mrs. John R Vaizey, who was a Life Governor of the British and Foreign School Society, which ran the Stockwell Normal College in London, one of the major teacher training colleges. The group most likely provided Sparks with a recommendation to this college; she took the entrance examination at the end of her year's teaching at Coryates and passed in second class, but was still able to start the course in January 1870. She improved this to a first class at the end of her first year at the college.

== Headteacher at Plymouth ==
Late in 1871 Sparks completed her studies at Stockwell, passing out with a first class in the final examinations, and in fifth place (there had been 127 students two years earlier, the closest available date). She applied for the post of headmistress at the Plymouth Public Free School (Girls Department). At the interview, the chair of the school board noted that she was very young. Memorably, her riposte was: "Well, sir, that is a thing that time will cure."

Plymouth was a substantial city (eighth largest in England in 1861, twelfth largest in 1881) and Sparks' brother commented that her school was "the second largest in the provinces." The highest daily attendance during her first month there, January 1872, was 160, while the comparable figure had risen to 409 by the time she left to have a family in 1877; she managed a staff of up to six. The salary for this role was substantial compared to what others from Sparks' background might expect to earn, being around £100 per year. The family correspondence shows a number of requests for loans and gifts over the time that she worked, but even so she was able to save some £400 over her time there, perhaps helped by the school's provision of accommodation.

== Relationships and family life ==
Sparks had a romantic relationship with Thomas Hardy, most likely starting in Summer 1867 during her year working at Puddletown School and when he had just returned from London; at that time she was 16 and he was 27. The passion of their relationship is captured by Hardy most intensely in the poem In A Eweleaze Near Weatherbury, as well as in At Rushy Pond and A Spot. There are some suggestions that Hardy's mother indicated that Sparks was Hardy's niece rather than cousin and that they were thus prevented from marrying one another, though it is now widely accepted that she did receive an engagement ring from him. There are also suggestions that she had Hardy's child, a son called Randolph. The relationship became limited when Sparks went to London to study, coinciding with the time that Hardy met his future wife Emma Gifford while on a trip to Cornwall, and ended when he became engaged to Gifford. Sparks is considered by John Fowles an "important figure in both [Hardy's] emotional and imaginative life" and author Nicholas Hillyard considers that their relationship was important in relation to Hardy's start as a novelist and poet.

Sparks was also the inspiration for Hardy's poem Thoughts of Phena at News of Her Death in which he describes her as his "lost prize". He and his brother Henry visited her grave, leaving a note saying "In loving memory -Tom Hardy". She may also have been one of the inspirations for Hardy's story that later became Far from the Madding Crowd. Other Hardy poems that have been connected to Sparks include The Wind's Prophecy and To an Orphan Child, also named To a Motherless Child, which is addressed to Tryphena's daughter whom he had met when visiting her family shortly after her death. The character of Sue Bridehead in Hardy's book Jude The Obscure is also thought to have been partly inspired by her and in the book's preface Hardy says that the circumstances of the novel had been suggested by the death of a woman in 1890. Sparks is the subject of ten separate 1960s publications by author Lois Deacon including Tryphena, Thomas Hardy and Hardy's Sweetest Image and Providence and Mr Hardy published in 1966.

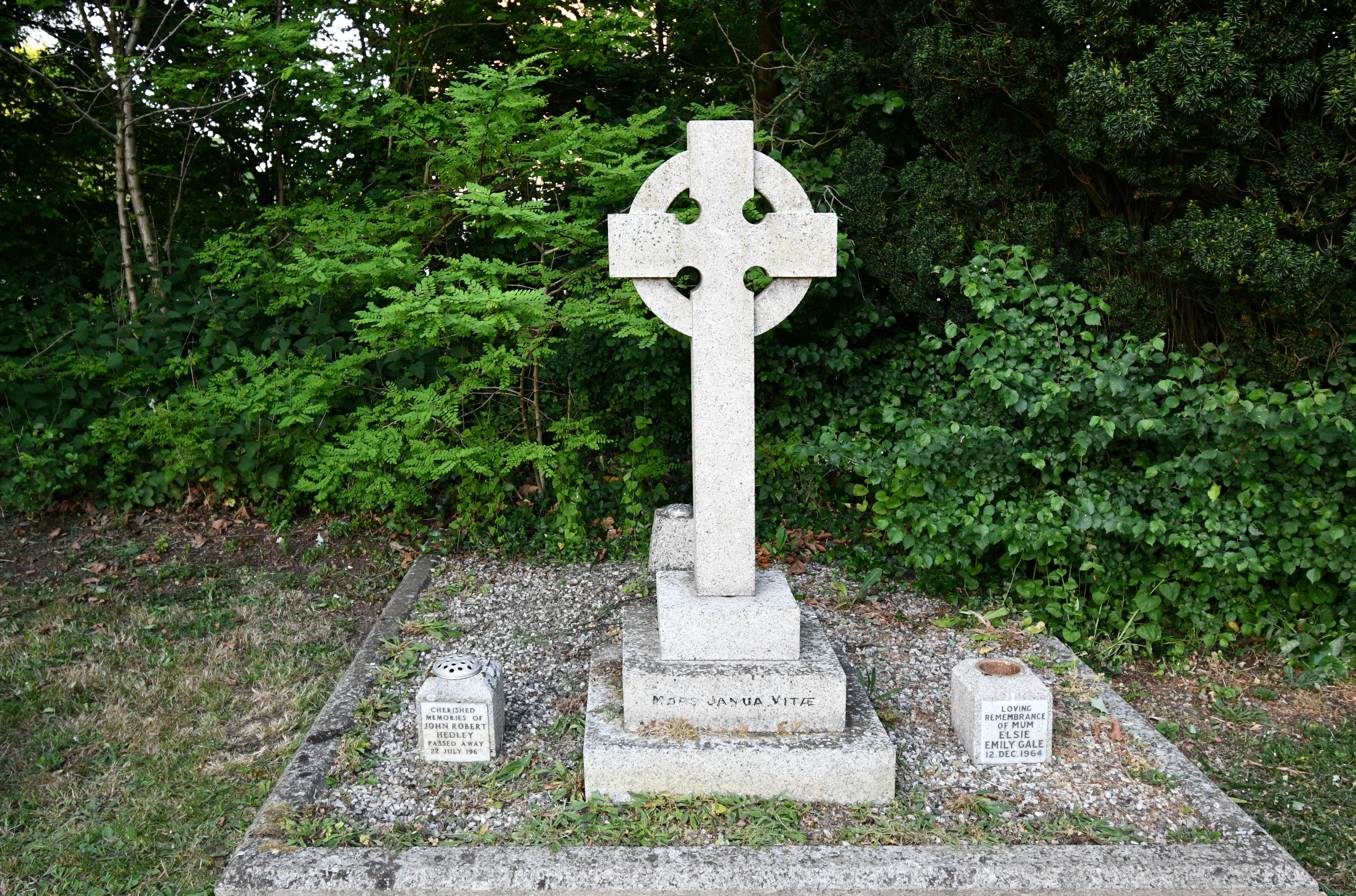
Tryphena Gale's grave in Topsham Cemetery

During her time as headmistress of Plymouth Day School, in 1873 she met Charles Frederick Gale, a publican from Topsham, Devon. They were married on 15 December 1877 at Plymouth. She had four children: Eleanor, Charles, George and Herbert, and was known in Topsham for the charitable work she did for the local fishermen. She died just before her fortieth birthday in 1890 and is buried in Topsham, Devon.
