= Piddlehinton =

Village in Dorset, England

Coordinates: 50.7739°N 2.4047°W

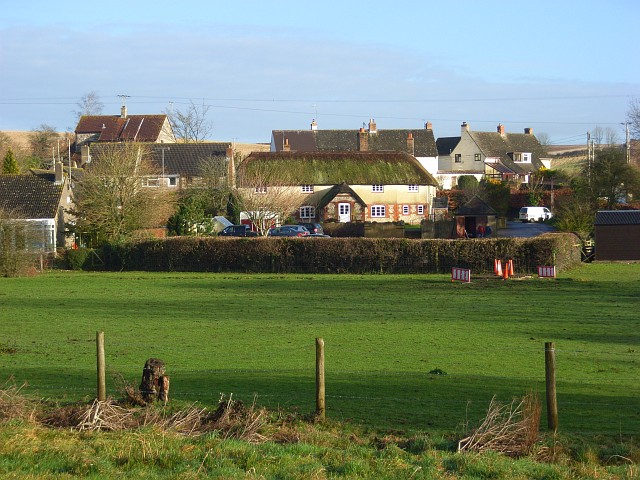
- The Thimble Inn and dwellings in Piddlehinton

- Location within Dorset
- Population: 403
- OS grid reference: SY715972
- Unitary authority: Dorset
- Ceremonial county: Dorset
- Region: South West
- Country: England
- Sovereign state: United Kingdom
- Post town: Dorchester
- Postcode district: DT2
- Dialling code: 01300
- Police: Dorset
- Fire: Dorset and Wiltshire
- Ambulance: South Western
- UK Parliament: West Dorset

Piddlehinton is a village and civil parish in west Dorset, England, situated in the Piddle valley 5 miles (8.0 km) north of Dorchester. In the 2011 census the parish had a population of 403. Piddlehinton formerly constituted a liberty containing only the parish itself.

The local schools are Piddle Valley First School, St Mary's Middle School in Puddletown, The Thomas Hardye School and Dorset Studio School in Dorchester, members of the DASP group. The village has one public house called The Thimble, the village has recently made a shop in the village not far from the Thimble inn public house The nearest shop is in Piddletrenthide. St Mary's Piddlehinton is the local church. A microbrewery—the Dorset Piddle Brewery—was established in Piddlehinton in 2008 and produces 300 gallons of ale every week.

During the build-up to D-Day the US Army operated from an airstrip in Piddlehinton using Piper L-4 Grasshoppers of the 62nd Armed Field Artillery Battalion. The exact location of the airstrip in Piddlehinton is unknown.

Piddlehinton is at the southern end of the Piddle Valley electoral ward, which extends north up the valley to Buckland Newton and had a population of 1,988 in the 2011 census.

Piddlehinton run two adult football teams, which both play in the Dorset Football League. The First XI are in division 2, whilst the reserves are in division 3. The reserves are the current holders of Dorset Division 4, after winning the league in the 2017/2018 season.

== See also ==
- List of liberties in Dorset
