= The Family (2003 TV series) =

- Genre: Reality Television
- Directed by: Bryan O'Donnell; Danny Salles
- Presented by: Clayton Halsey
- Country of origin: United States
- Original language: English
- No. of seasons: 1
- No. of episodes: 9

Production
- Production locations: Palm Beach, Florida, United States
- Running time: 60 minutes
- Production company: Arnold Shapiro Productions

Original release
- Release: March 4, 2003

The Family is a reality television series that aired on ABC spanning one season in 2003. It starred ten members from an Italian-American family, who were each fighting for a $1,000,000 prize. The show was hosted by George Hamilton.

== Story ==
Ten family members from New York City were removed from their daily lives and moved into a mansion in Wellington, Florida. The house was fully furnished and came with a full staff of multiple maids, butlers, and a full cooking staff.

Each week, the contestants played reward challenges and elimination contests. The elimination contests determined the two people who would be up for elimination from play. The elimination worked by gathering a secret Board of Trustees and making a decision on which member should be eliminated. The Board of Trustees, unbeknownst to the family itself, comprised the house's maids, servants, and other workers. The Board usually chose to eliminate the family member who they felt was less deserving of the money. The family member who was eliminated, however, was allowed to remain in the house, but not allowed to participate in "family activities".

== Contestants ==
All the contestants were directly related, be they brother and sister, mother and father or cousin and second cousin. In the first part of the game, three contestants were eliminated. These three lost the elimination contest, and were rejected by the Board of Trustees. During the second phase of the game, more strategic plays were made by the remaining contestants to try to rid the contestant pool of the strongest threats. Three of the stronger contestants were eliminated in this phase. When the contestant pool was narrowed down to four, the challenges became physical and mental. Eventually one survived and made it to the end. The Board of Trustees had the final word on eliminations up to this point. When the final contestant remained, the eliminated family members were allowed to vote one of themselves back into the game for the final challenge. The eliminated contestants selected Anthony, the considered the "wild, immature, yet strong" family member. The final contestant, selected by the Board of Trustees, was Michael, considered by many to be the lovable family outcast.

The winner of the final challenge was Anthony, who claimed the Million Dollar Prize. He was given the option of either keeping the money for himself, or splitting the prize equally between the ten members. After remaining in solitary confinement overnight to contemplate his choice, Anthony decided that "[he didn't] deserve more money than anyone who played this game." He chose to split the money equally between the ten, and everyone received $100,000 each.

== The Board of Trustees ==
In a twist, the Board of Trustees was, in fact, the household staff, consisting of the maid (Linda Levis), butler (Andrew Lowrey), social secretary (Ringo Allen), personal stylist (Jill Swid) and chef (Franck Porcher). The family was surprised (and some members became visibly upset) to discover that, instead of being judged by business or society experts, they were being judged by the very same people who cleaned their toilets and washed their dishes.

== Elimination order ==
Contestant	Ep 1	Ep 2	Ep 3	Ep 4	Ep 5	Ep 6	Ep 7	Ep 8	Ep 9
Cousin Mike	RISK	SAFE	RISK	SAFE	RISK	SAFE	SAFE	CHOICE	LOST
Cousin Dawn Marie	SAFE	RISK	SAFE	SAFE	SAFE	SAFE	SAFE	OUT	
Cousin Ed	SAFE	SAFE	SAFE	SAFE	SAFE	RISK	RISK	OUT	
Uncle Michael	SAFE	SAFE	SAFE	SAFE	SAFE	SAFE	OUT		
Cousin Jill	SAFE	SAFE	SAFE	RISK	SAFE	OUT			
Anthony	SAFE	SAFE	SAFE	SAFE	OUT				WON
Aunt Donna	SAFE	SAFE	SAFE	OUT					
Cousin Maria	SAFE	SAFE	OUT						
Cousin Melinda	SAFE	OUT							
Cousin Robert	OUT								

== Critical reception ==
The "Family" received mixed reviews upon its debut in 2003. The USA Today described the show as a "tacky debacle," that "ridicul[ed] the family's heritage, from the snobbish dismissal of their preference for Italian food . . . to the on-air logo that echoes the logo for The Godfather."

While the Hollywood Reporter said ""The Family" is a wacky, enjoyable hoot..." "a laugh out loud riot" "that should crack up viewers." And VARIETY called the series "...one of the best comedies on television." "perfectly edited" and "a worthy guilty pleasure."

The popular reception was generally positive, but the show was temporarily pulled from the air at the start of the Iraq War to make room for additional ABC News reports. When the series returned at a later date, it had lost its momentum and was not picked up for a second season.

Italian-American cultural critic George de Stefano credits this reality show, in lampooning the mores and lifestyles of East-coast urban Italian-Americans, as having been the inspiration for more successful yet similar programs such as "Growing up Gotti" and "Jersey Shore".

== British version ==
A British version called What the Butler Saw aired on Channel 4 for six episodes from November 11 until December 16, 2004.

== Link ==
Official Website
