= Michael Butler (diplomat) =

British diplomat (1927-2013)

Sir Michael Butler GCMG (27 February 1927 – 24 December 2013) was a British diplomat and a collector of 17th century Chinese porcelain. This collection was described by daughter Katharine Butler in her book "Leaping The Dragon Gate".

== Career ==
Michael Dacres Butler was educated at Winchester College and Trinity College, Oxford, and joined the Foreign Service in 1950. He served in New York, Baghdad, Paris and Geneva before spending a year as Fellow at the Harvard Center for International Affairs 1970–71. He was then Counsellor at Washington, D.C., 1971–72, head of the European Integration Department at the Foreign and Commonwealth Office (FCO) 1972–74, assistant Under-Secretary in charge of European Community affairs 1974–76, deputy Under-Secretary 1976–79, and ambassador and permanent representative to the European Communities, Brussels, 1979–85.

Butler left the Foreign Office in 1985 and was a director of Hambros Bank 1986–94 (subsequently non-executive director 1994–97 and consultant 1997–98). He was chairman of the council of the Royal College of Art 1991–96 and was a Senior Fellow. He was deputy chairman of the board of trustees of the Victoria and Albert Museum 1985–97.

Butler was appointed CMG in the New Year Honours of 1975, knighted KCMG in the New Year Honours of 1980 and raised to GCMG in the Queen's Birthday Honours of 1984. He was made a Knight Grand Cross of the Order of Merit of Portugal in 1998.

== Porcelain Collection ==
Sir Michael assembled an exceptional collection of 17th century Chinese porcelain, described as "indubitably the best in the world in the context of Chinese 17th century porcelain." After his death, the collection was divided following a High Court ruling, at the end of a lengthy court case involving his four children, which determined that each of his children was entitled to a quarter share, 250 pieces from the 850 collected by Sir Michael were removed from the museum built to house them. But the whole family collection lives in a book by Katharine Butler "Leaping The Dragon Gate" published in 2021 and in the museum reopened with over 650 pieces on display.

== Personal life ==
Butler was married to Ann Clyde, daughter of James Latham Clyde, Lord Clyde, until 1997. He has four children, including Katharine Butler.

== Publications ==
- Europe: More than a Continent, Heinemann, London, 1986. ISBN 0434099252
- Chinese porcelain, the transitional period, 1620-1683: a selection from the Michael Butler collection (with Barbara Harrisson), Princessehof Ceramics Museum, 1986
- Seventeenth century Jingdezhen porcelain from the Shanghai Museum and the Butler collections: beauty's enchantment (with Wang Qingzheng), Scala Publishers, 2006. ISBN 1857594177
- Late Ming : Chinese porcelain from the Butler Collections, Musée national d'histoire et d'art, Luxembourg, 2008. ISBN 2879850290

Diplomatic posts
Preceded by Sir Donald Maitland	Permanent Representative to the European Communities; 1979–1985	Succeeded by Sir David Hannay
