= Christopher Debenham =

English cricketer

Christopher John Debenham (born 4 April 1953 (age 71)) is an English former cricketer. He was a right-handed batsman who played for Hertfordshire. He was born in St Albans.

Debenham represented Hertfordshire in the Minor Counties Championship between 1975 and 1977 and made a single List A appearance for the side, in the 1977 Gillette Cup. He scored 3 runs from the upper-middle order.
