= Puddletown and Lower Winterborne =

Electoral ward in Dorset, England

- ward Dorset Council
- Population: 5,555
- Major settlements: Puddletown

Current ward
- Created: 2019
- Councillor: Emma Jayne Parker (Conservative)
- Number of councillors: 1

Puddletown and Lower Winterborne is an electoral ward in Dorset. Since 2019, the ward has elected 1 councillor to Dorset Council.

== Geography ==
The Puddletown and Lower Winterborne ward is rural and contains Puddletown and the villages of the lower Winterborne valley.

== Councillors ==
Election	Councillors
2019	Emma Jayne Parker (Conservative)
2024	Emma Jayne Parker (Conservative)

== Elections ==
=== 2019 Dorset Council election ===
2019 Dorset Council election: Puddletown and Lower Winterborne (1 seat)
Party	Candidate	Votes	%	±%
Conservative	Emma Jayne Parker	789	48.5	
Liberal Democrats	Helen Francis	388	23.9	
Independent	Kevin Nicholas Maitland-Gleed	257	15.8	
Labour	Emma Elizabeth Bratley	192	11.8	
Majority		401	24.6	
Turnout			38.40	
Conservative win (new seat)				

=== 2024 Dorset Council election ===
2024 Dorset Council election: Puddletown and Lower Winterborne (1 seat)
Party	Candidate	Votes	%	±%
Conservative	Emma Jayne Parker*	603	46.3	−2.2
Liberal Democrats	James Henry Lloyd	456	35.0	+11.1
Labour	Helen Badger	243	18.7	+6.9
Turnout		1,302	30.74	
Conservative hold		Swing		

== See also ==
- List of electoral wards in Dorset
