= Briantspuddle =

Village in Dorset, England

Coordinates: 50.7383°N 2.2614°W

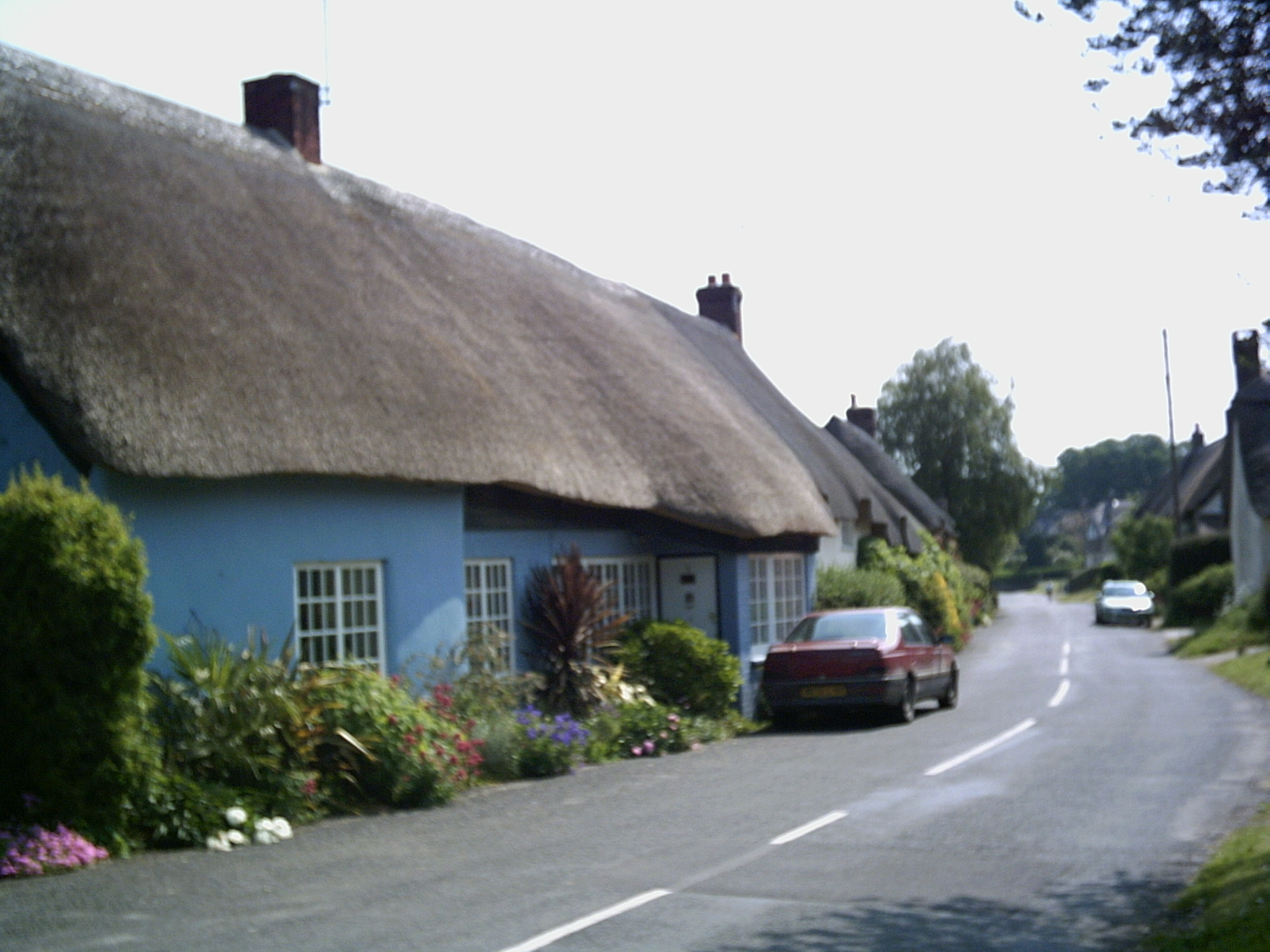
Briantspuddle village in Dorset

Briantspuddle is a small village in the Piddle Valley in Dorset, England, near the villages of Affpuddle and Tolpuddle and about 8 miles (13 km) east of the county town of Dorchester. It forms part of the civil parish of Affpuddle and Turnerspuddle in the unitary authority area administered by Dorset.

The village takes its name from Brian de Turberville, who was lord of the manor during the reign of Edward III. It falls within the Piddle Valley Conservation Area and contains 35 listed buildings.

== History ==
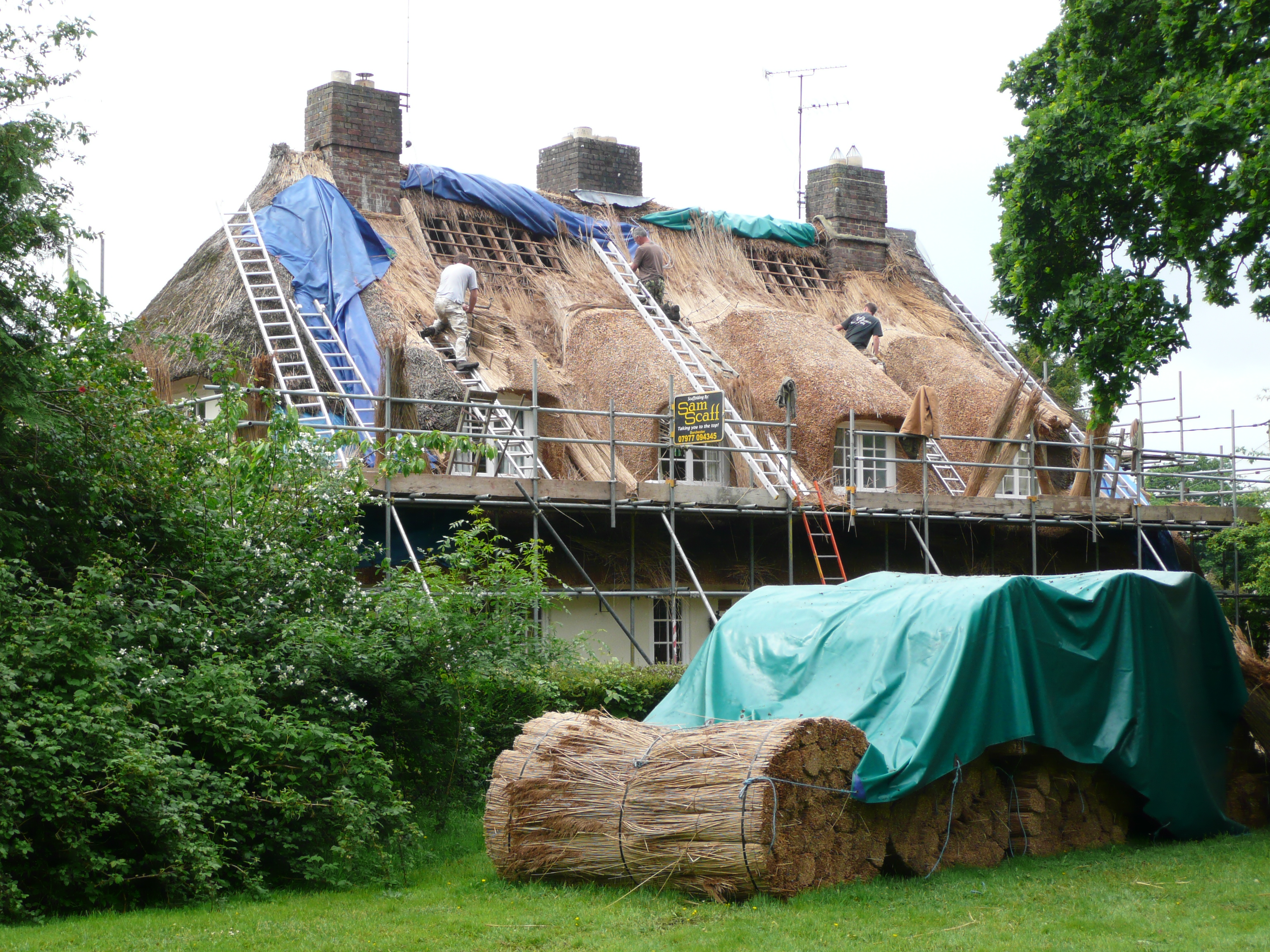
Thatching at work in Bladen Valley, Briantspuddle

The first known reference to the village can be found in the Geld, an assessment made for land tax purposes in 1083. The village was then known as "Pidele" and was held by a priest named Godric. The village was later mentioned in the Domesday Book in 1086 as having "land for three ploughs, a mill, thirty-eight acres (15 hectares) of meadow, 12 acres (4.9 ha) of woodland, eleven furlongs (2.2 km) of pasture in length and 12 in width." This was valued at £4 and Godric was in charge of "about a dozen people who worked the land".

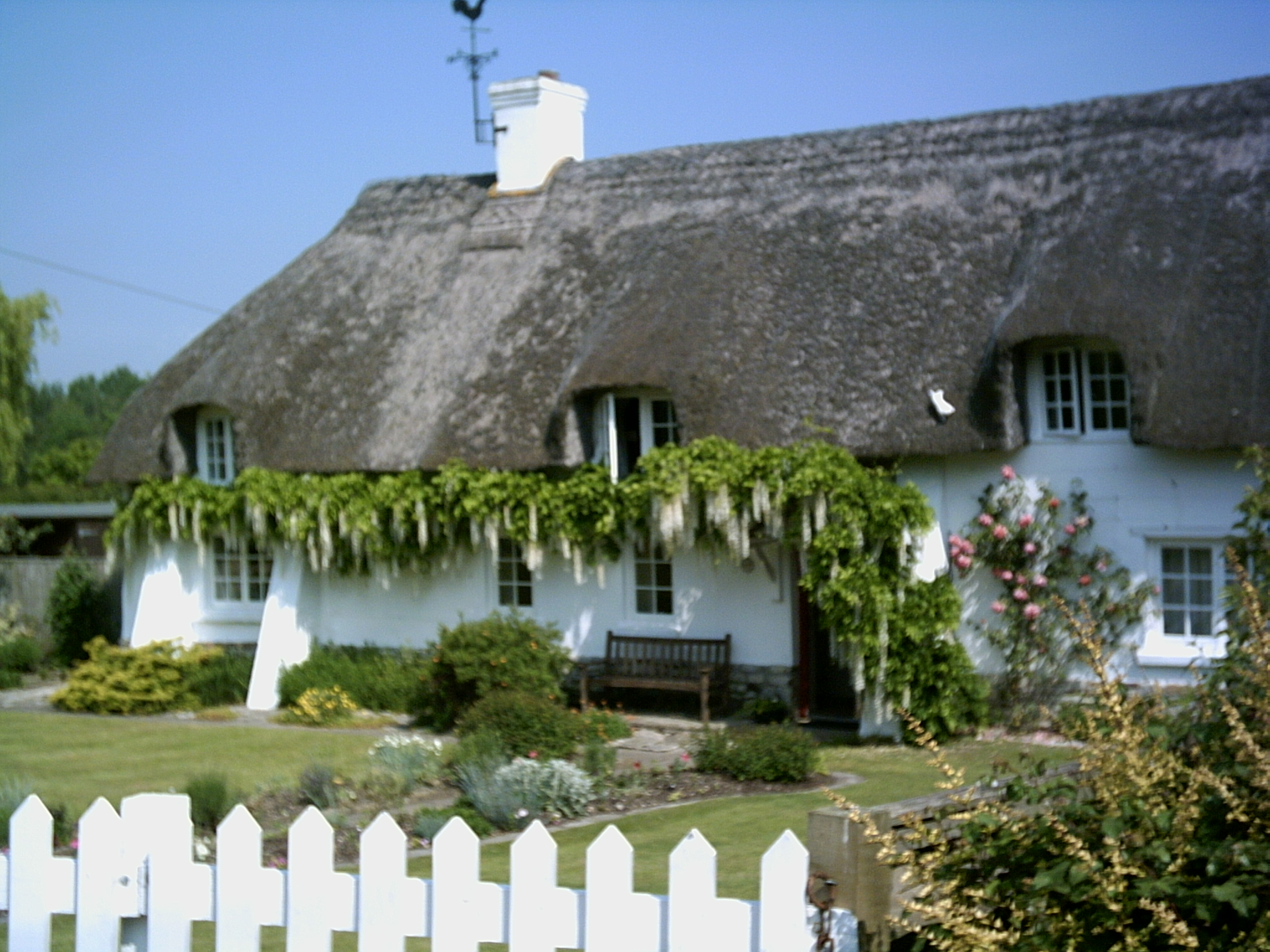
Cruck Cottage, one of the original 12 houses in Briantspuddle

By the 13th century, the village was known as "Priestpidele" (probably through its association with Godric), and by the 14th century it was owned by several parties, including the Prior of Christchurch, the Frampton family and the Turberville family. In 1683 William Frampton united the manors of Throop, Briantspuddle and Affpuddle into a single estate.

In 1914 financial hardship forced the Frampton family to sell part of their estate, including the village of Briantspuddle, to Sir Ernest Debenham, (grandson of William Debenham, founder of the British department store Debenhams).

=== The Bladen Estate ===
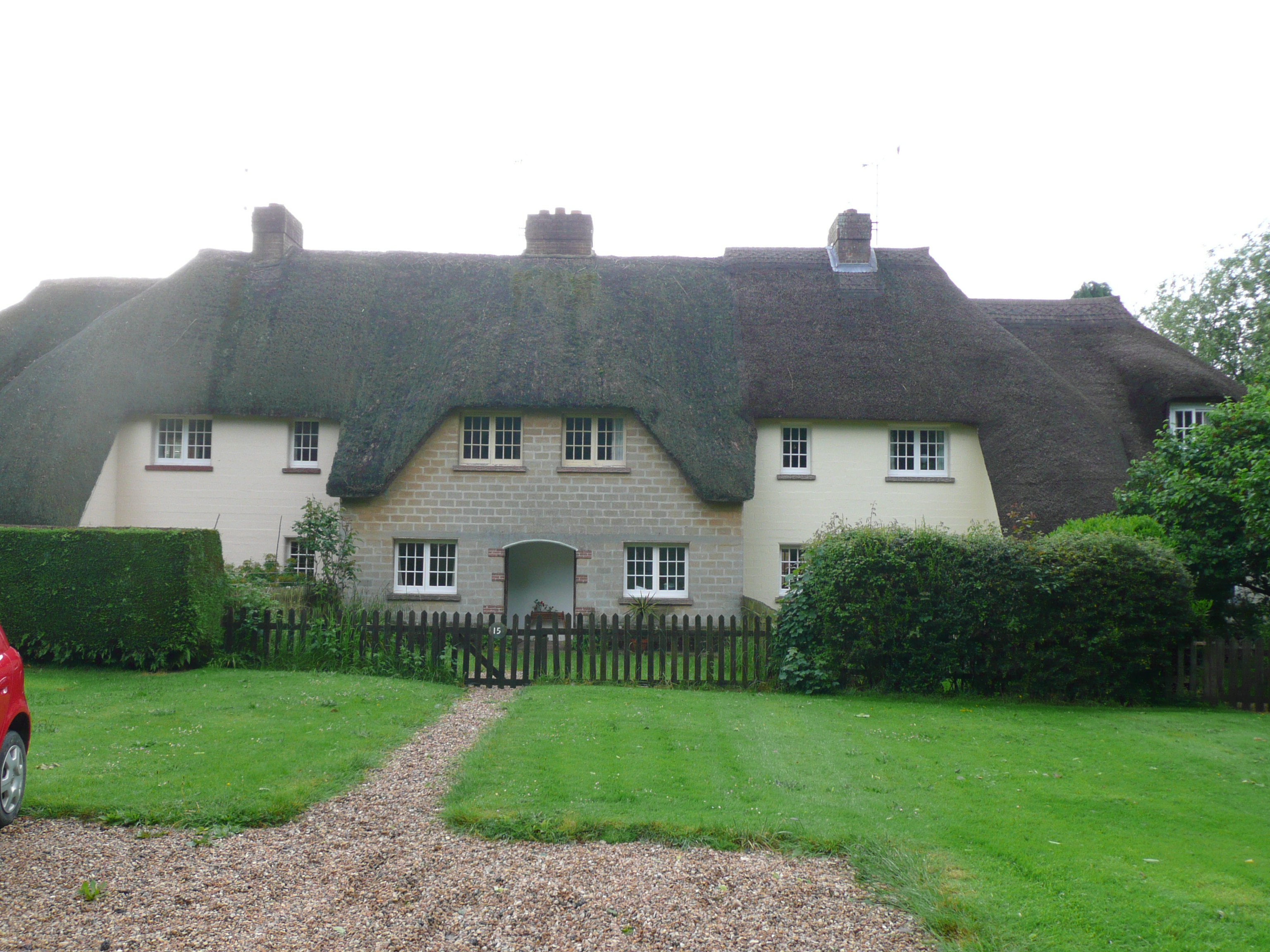
Cottages in Bladen Valley clearly showing block construction

Briantspuddle once consisted of twelve cottages (which still exist within the village today) until Ernest Debenham expanded the village under the concept of creating a self-sufficient agricultural enterprise. By 1929 forty new cottages had been built to house the estate workers. His vision was that every house would have an inside toilet and at least a quarter of an acre of garden. Work was delayed by the First World War.

Many of the houses in the village are constructed from specially hand-made 'airspaced' concrete blocks which were produced locally. These reduced the need for foundations and aimed to insulate by the air gaps and over 200,000 were produced annually. The consistency of the design of new houses and agricultural buildings is due to the use of Arts and Crafts style which was adapted to reflect the distinctive character of vernacular architecture in the area by the architects Halsey Ricardo and Leslie MacDonald Gill. Bladen Valley represents an interesting example of a 'model' estate, which has been listed in its entirety. Unusually, the house numbers in the village were based on the order in which rent was collected, rather that the more traditional sequence of odd and even numbers.

The Bladen Farms were an experiment to prove that under modern conditions it was possible for Dorset to produce a larger proportion of home-grown foods, especially of animal origin, than it did previously. Ernest Debenham argued that this would "readjust the balance of population and enable a larger number of workers to live on the land". His plan was to support smaller neighbouring farms with special facilities that could provide economies of scale. This 'demonstration farm' replaced "middlemen and intermediaries" and the project was very successful at pasteurisation and other successes included egg production, electricity generation and selective breeding of livestock (as a result of which many prize winning sheep and cattle were produced), forestry, bee-keeping, and a farm veterinary service. Following Debenham's death in 1952 the estate was broken up and sold.

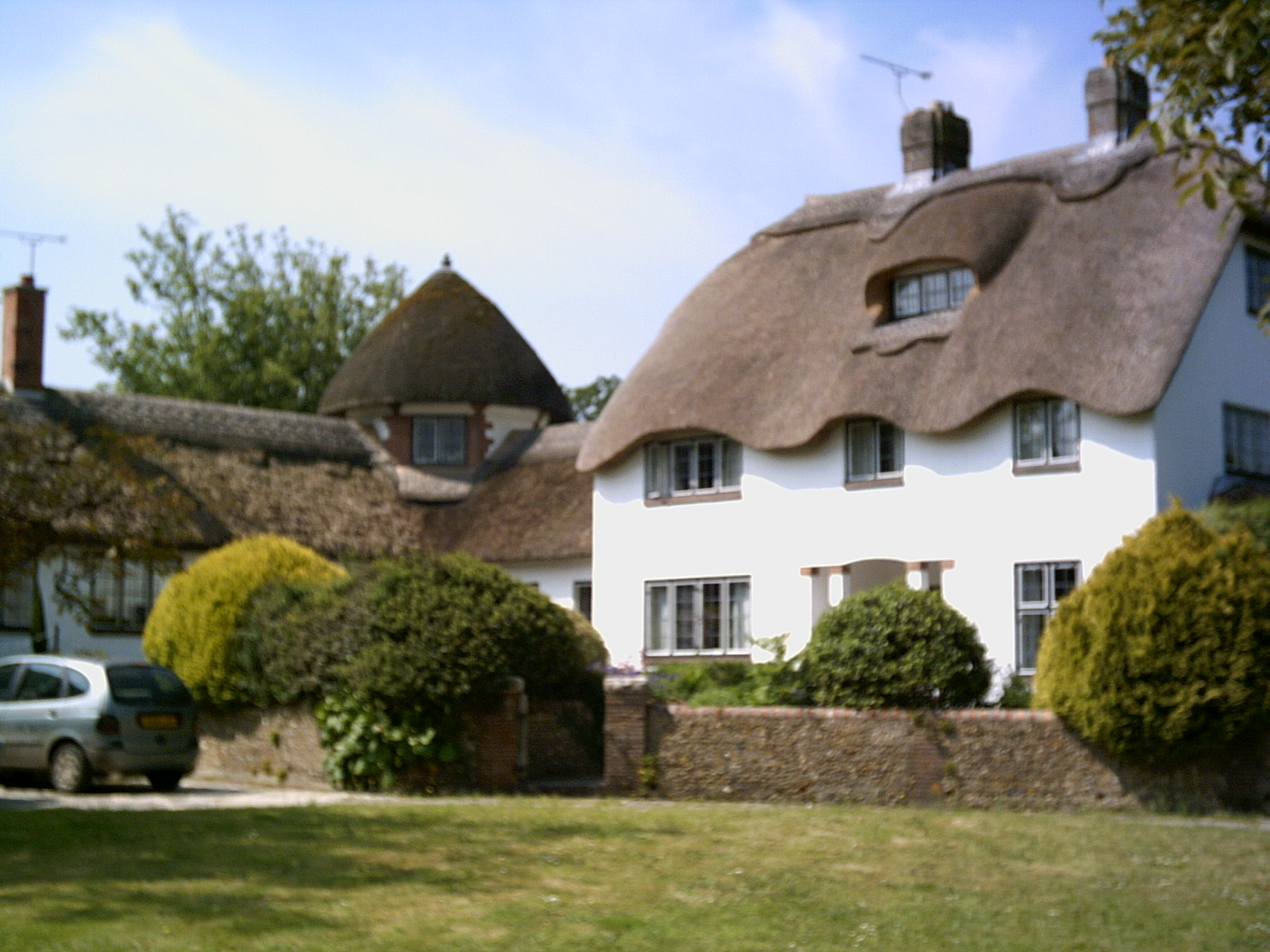
The Old Dairy, part of Ernest Debenham's new development.

== Notable buildings ==
- The dairy (known locally as 'the Ring') was the first to have large scale milking machines installed in Dorset. In the 1920s up to 1,000 gallons of milk a day were brought in from surrounding farms for processing and bottling.
- There is no longer any dairy farm, most local dairy enterprise having succumbed to the complex milk monopoly. Beef production has replaced dairying as a much smaller income for local farmers, as well as horse farming.
- The village hall is a former barn which once formed part of Briantspuddle Farm (No. 26). It was rebuilt in 1803 by James Frampton, converted by Debenham and purchased by the parish Council in 1953.
- Cruck cottage is the oldest building in the village, thought to be late fifteenth century in origin. It is so called because it has the original cruck beam from ground to roof.

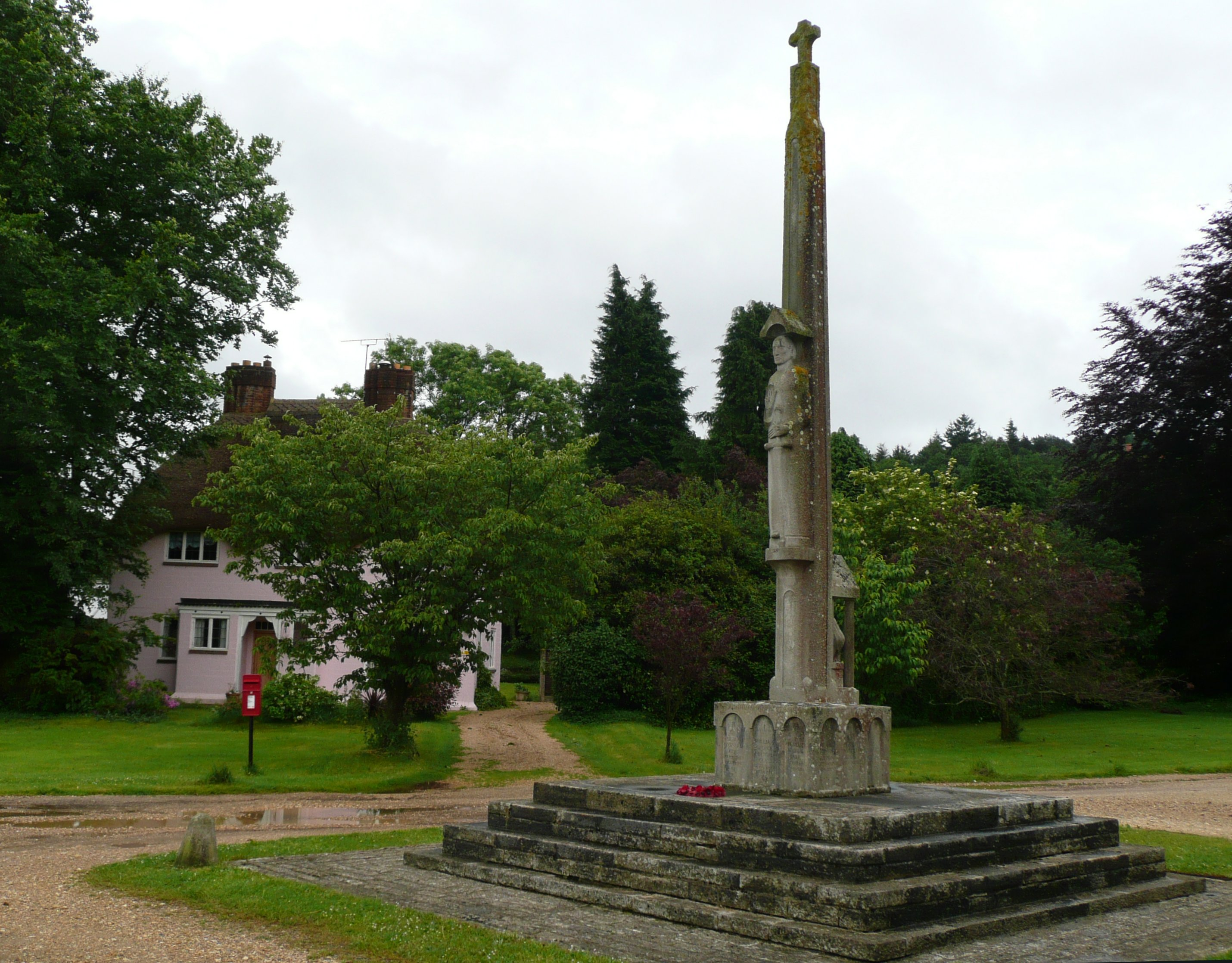
Briantspuddle war memorial

- The sculptor and artist Eric Gill (whose brother Leslie MacDonald Gill designed several houses in the village as architect in residence 1914–19) was commissioned by Ernest Debenham to sculpt the Madonna and Child war memorial in situ starting in January 1918 and completing the work an August. A column of Portland stone, the unusual memorial has an inscription from the fifteenth century mystic Julian of Norwich:

It is sooth that sin is cause of all this pain but all shall be well and all shall be well all manner of thing shall be well.

The cross was dedicated by the Bishop of Salisbury one day after the Armistice was signed in 1918.
