= Burleston =

Village in Dorset, England

Coordinates: 50.74°N 02.32°W

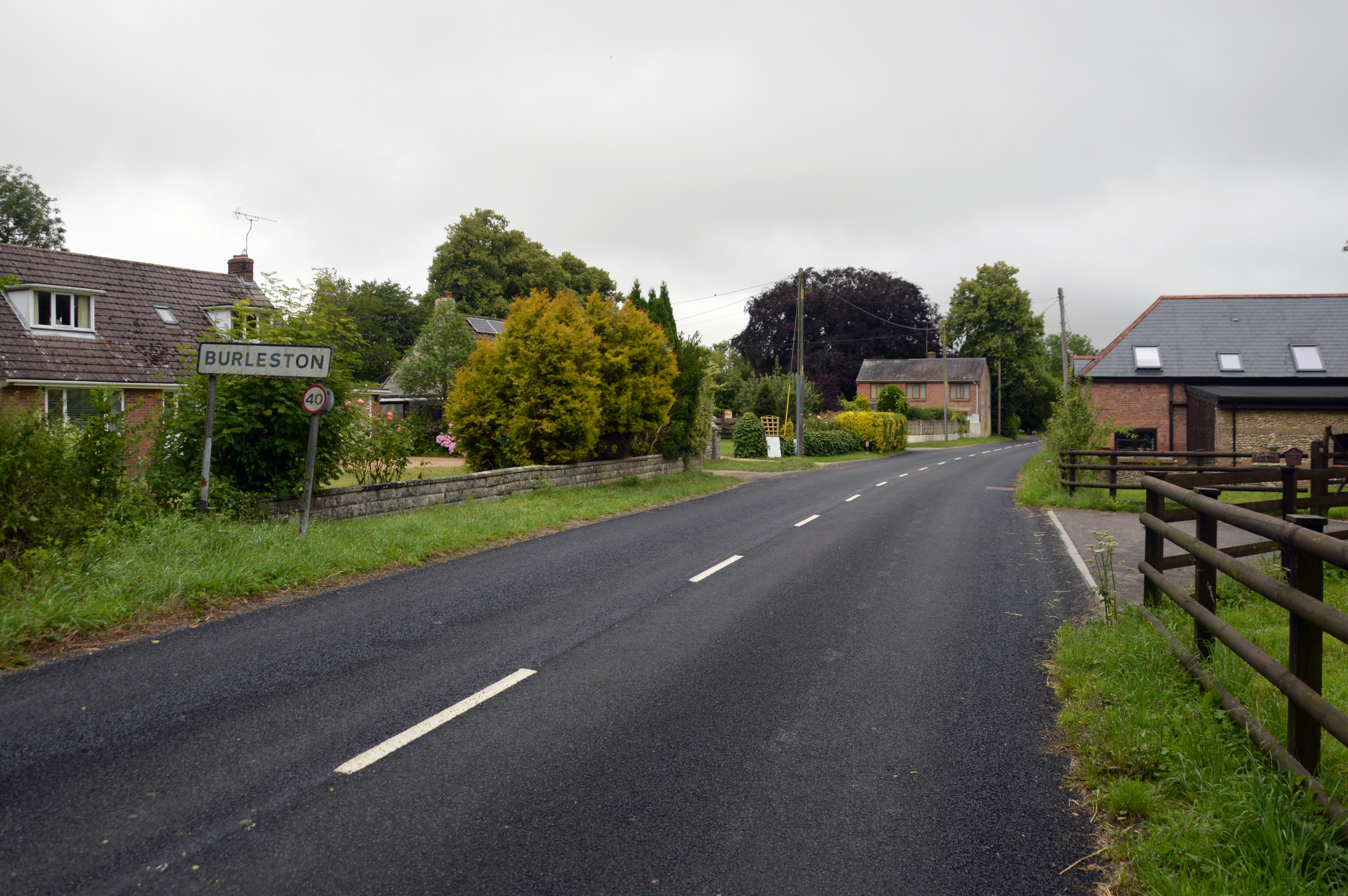
- Athelhampton Road through Burleston in 2024

- Location within Dorset
- OS grid reference: SY7794
- Civil parish: Burleston and Tolpuddle
- Unitary authority: Dorset
- Ceremonial county: Dorset
- Region: South West
- Country: England
- Sovereign state: United Kingdom
- Post town: Dorchester
- Postcode district: DT2
- Police: Dorset
- Fire: Dorset and Wiltshire
- Ambulance: South Western
- UK Parliament: West Dorset

Burleston is a village in the civil parish of Burleston and Tolpuddle, in Dorset, England. In 2001 the parish had a population of 27. On 1 April 2024 the parish was abolished and merged with Tolpuddle to form "Burleston and Tolpuddle".

Burleston is listed in the Domesday Book of 1086 as a manor of Milton Abbey, having at that time a small population of nine households.
