= Debenham House =

Listed building in London, England

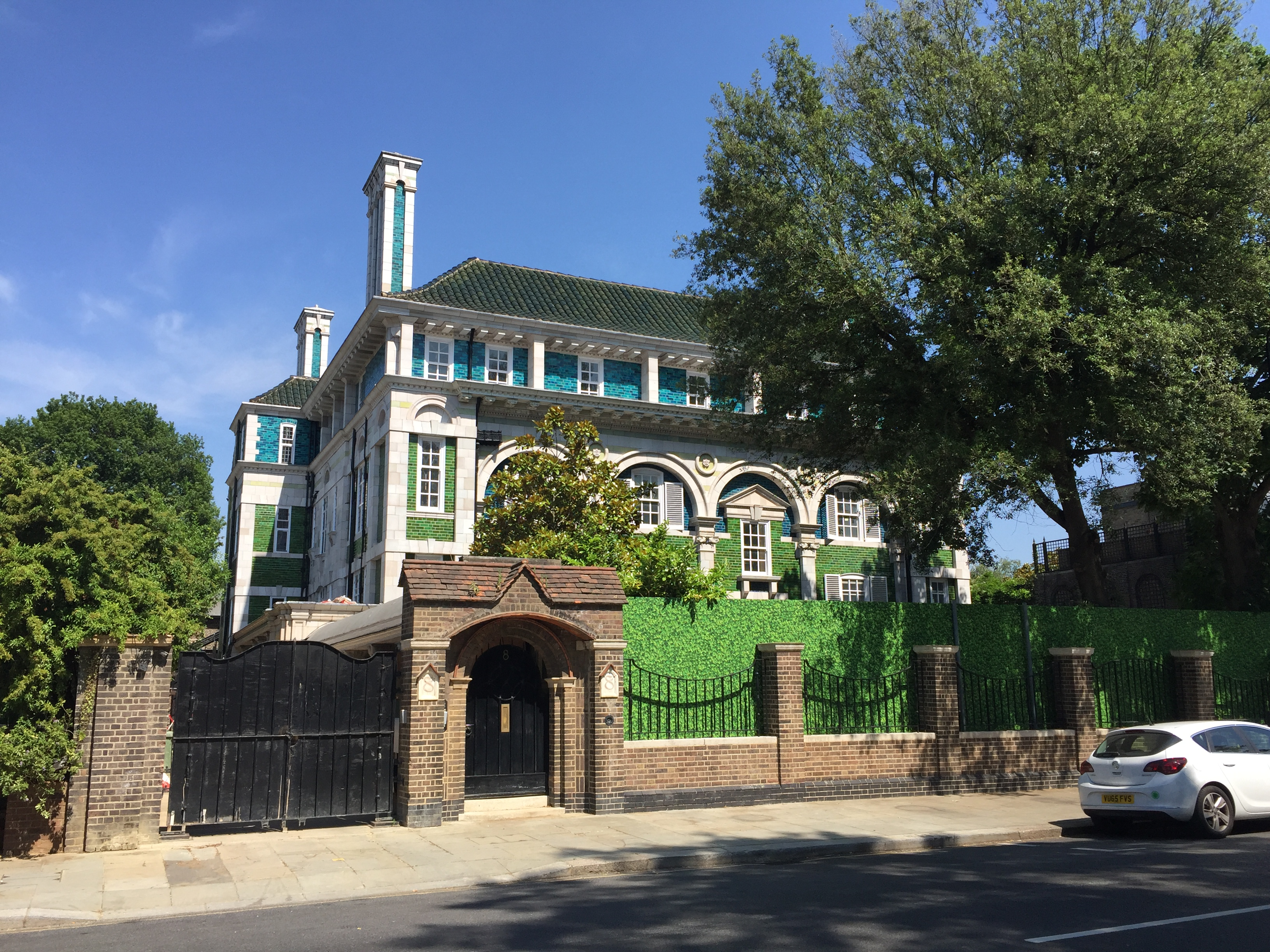
- Debenham House, 2017

- Location within Greater London
- 51°30′8.94″N 0°12′31.82″W
- Location: 8 Addison Road, Holland Park, West London, England

History
- Built: 1905–07

Site notes
- Architect: Halsey Ricardo
- Architectural style: Arts and Crafts
- Governing body: Privately owned

Listed Building – Grade I
- Official name: Debenham House
- Designated: 15 April 1969 (57 years ago)
- Reference no.: 1080783

Debenham House (or Peacock House) at 8 Addison Road is a large detached house in the Holland Park district of Kensington and Chelsea, W14. Built in the Arts and Crafts style by the architect Halsey Ricardo, it is a Grade I listed building.

== History ==
The house was designed in 1905 for department store owner Ernest Ridley Debenham. Debenham had previously lived in another house designed by Ricardo, at 57 Melbury Road in Holland Park. The house only became known as Debenham House after it was sold on Sir Ernest's death. From 1955 to 1965, the house was used by the London College of Dance and Drama. In the 1990s, it housed the headquarters of Richmond Fellowship and was the venue for Royal Garden Parties.

== Architecture ==
Debenham House combines an Italianate exterior with an Arts and Crafts interior. Both are richly decorated. The house is clad in Royal Doulton Carrara ware with green and blue Burmantofts bricks. Ricardo favoured polychromy for its design effects, but it also served a practical purpose, as the glazing resisted the aging effects of the polluted London air. The critic Jonathan Meades described the house as "structurally stodgy – an alderman dressed as a hippy."

The interior contains tiles designed by William De Morgan, a mosaic dome painted by Gaetano Meo, ceilings painted by Ernest Gimson and stained glass by Edward Schroeder Prior. The decoration throughout is overwhelming. A domed hall has a gallery linking the upstairs rooms. Mosaics show members of the Debenham family, mixed with gods and goddesses from classical mythology. There are marble and tile fireplaces and mahogany bookcases decorated with Art Nouveau inserts in wood and mother of pearl. The light switches were made by the Birmingham Guild of Handicraft.

== Filming location ==
The house has been used as a film and television location, including; The Wings of the Dove, Secret Ceremony, What the Butler Saw, Spooks, two episodes of Agatha Christie's Poirot, Lord Edgware Dies and Cards on the Table, Trottie True and the BBC's The Mrs Bradley Mysteries.

== Bibliography ==
- Stourton, James (2012). Great Houses of London. London: Frances Lincoln. ISBN 978-0-7112-3366-9.
