= Tolpuddle =

Village in Dorset, England

Coordinates: 50.7495°N 2.2962°W

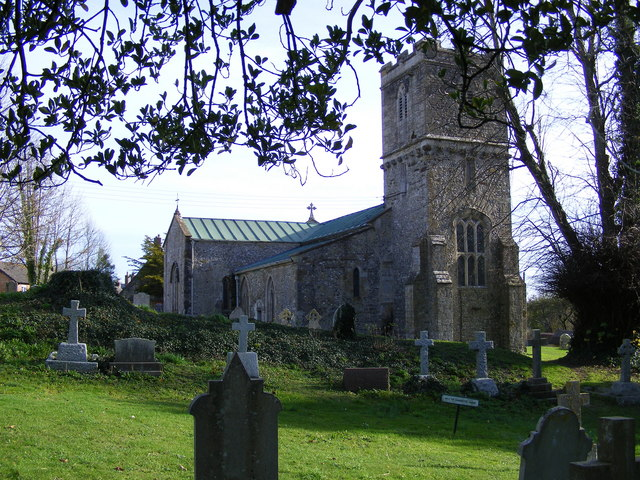
- Parish Church of St John the Evangelist

- Location within Dorset
- Population: 420 (2023 estimate)
- OS grid reference: SY792944
- Civil parish: Burleston and Tolpuddle
- Unitary authority: Dorset
- Ceremonial county: Dorset
- Region: South West
- Country: England
- Sovereign state: United Kingdom
- Post town: Dorchester
- Postcode district: DT2
- Police: Dorset
- Fire: Dorset and Wiltshire
- Ambulance: South Western
- UK Parliament: North Dorset

Tolpuddle ( /ˈtɒlpʌdəl/) is a village in the civil parish of Burleston and Tolpuddle, in Dorset, England, on the River Piddle from which it takes its name, 8 miles (13 km) east of Dorchester, the county town, and 12 miles (19 km) west of Poole. The estimated population of the parish in 2013 was 420.

== Etymology ==
Tolpuddle originally bore the name 'Tolpiddle'. The entry for Tolpuddle in the Key to English Place-Names reads:

'Tola's River Piddle farm/settlement'. Tola was the widow of Edward the Confessor's house-carl, Urc. She was given permission to give her lands to Abbotsbury abbey between 1058 and 1066.

== Tolpuddle Martyrs ==
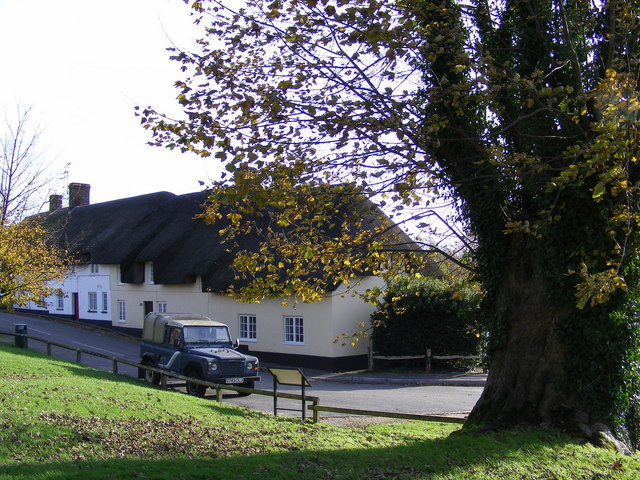
The Green at Tolpuddle. It is believed that whilst sitting under this sycamore tree, the six Tolpuddle Martyrs agreed to form a trade union

The village is well known as the home of the Tolpuddle Martyrs, six men who were sentenced to be transported to Australia after they formed a friendly society in 1833. A row of cottages, housing agricultural workers and a museum, and a row of seated statues commemorate the martyrs. The annual Tolpuddle Martyrs festival is held in the village on the third weekend of July. An ancient sycamore tree on the village green, known as the Martyrs' Tree, is said to be the place where the Martyrs swore their oath. It is cared for by the National Trust.

The Martyrs Inn public house is owned by nearby Athelhampton House, a Tudor house open to the public approximately 1 mile (1.6 km) to the west.

== Landmarks ==
St John the Evangelist's Parish Church dates from the 13th century.

In 1999, the A35 trunk road through south Dorset, was moved to bypass both Tolpuddle and nearby Puddletown.

== Governance ==
At the local government level, Tolpuddle is in the Puddletown Area parish council and the Dorset unitary authority area. For elections to Dorset Council is part of the Puddletown and Lower Winterborne electoral ward. On 1 April 2024 the parish was abolished and merged with Burleston to form "Burleston and Tolpuddle".

Historically, Tolpuddle was in Puddletown Hundred. It was part of Dorchester Rural District from 1894 to 1974, and West Dorset district from 1974 to 2019.

In the UK national parliament, Tolpuddle is within the North Dorset parliamentary constituency, having been moved from West Dorset in 2024.
