= Turners Puddle =

Village in Dorset, England

Coordinates: 50°44′N 2°14′W

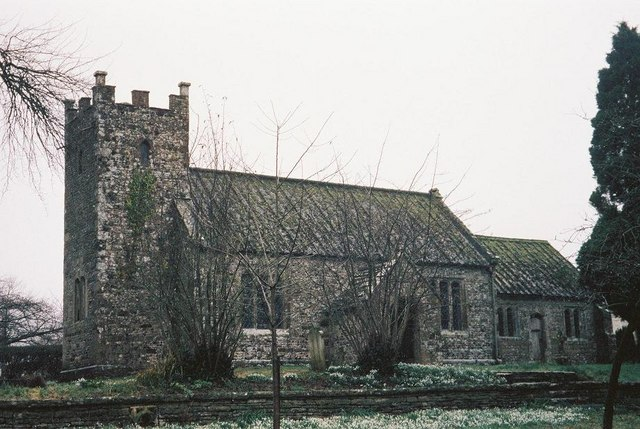
- Turners Puddle parish church of the Holy Trinity in 1995

- Location within Dorset
- Population: 60 (2001 census)
- Civil parish: Affpuddle and Turnerspuddle
- Unitary authority: Dorset
- Ceremonial county: Dorset
- Region: South West
- Country: England
- Sovereign state: United Kingdom

Turners Puddle is a village and former civil parish, now in the parish of Affpuddle and Turnerspuddle, in the Dorset district, in the ceremonial county of Dorset, England. It is situated on the River Piddle, 7 miles (11 km) north west of Wareham. In 2001 the parish had a population of 60. On 1 April 2010 the parish was abolished and merged with Affpuddle to form "Affpuddle and Turnerspuddle". In the 2011 census this joint parish had 200 households and a population of 436.

The parish includes Clouds Hill, a cottage that was the home of T. E. Lawrence and is now run by the National Trust.
