= Ernest Debenham =

English businessman (1865-1952)

Sir Ernest Debenham Bt
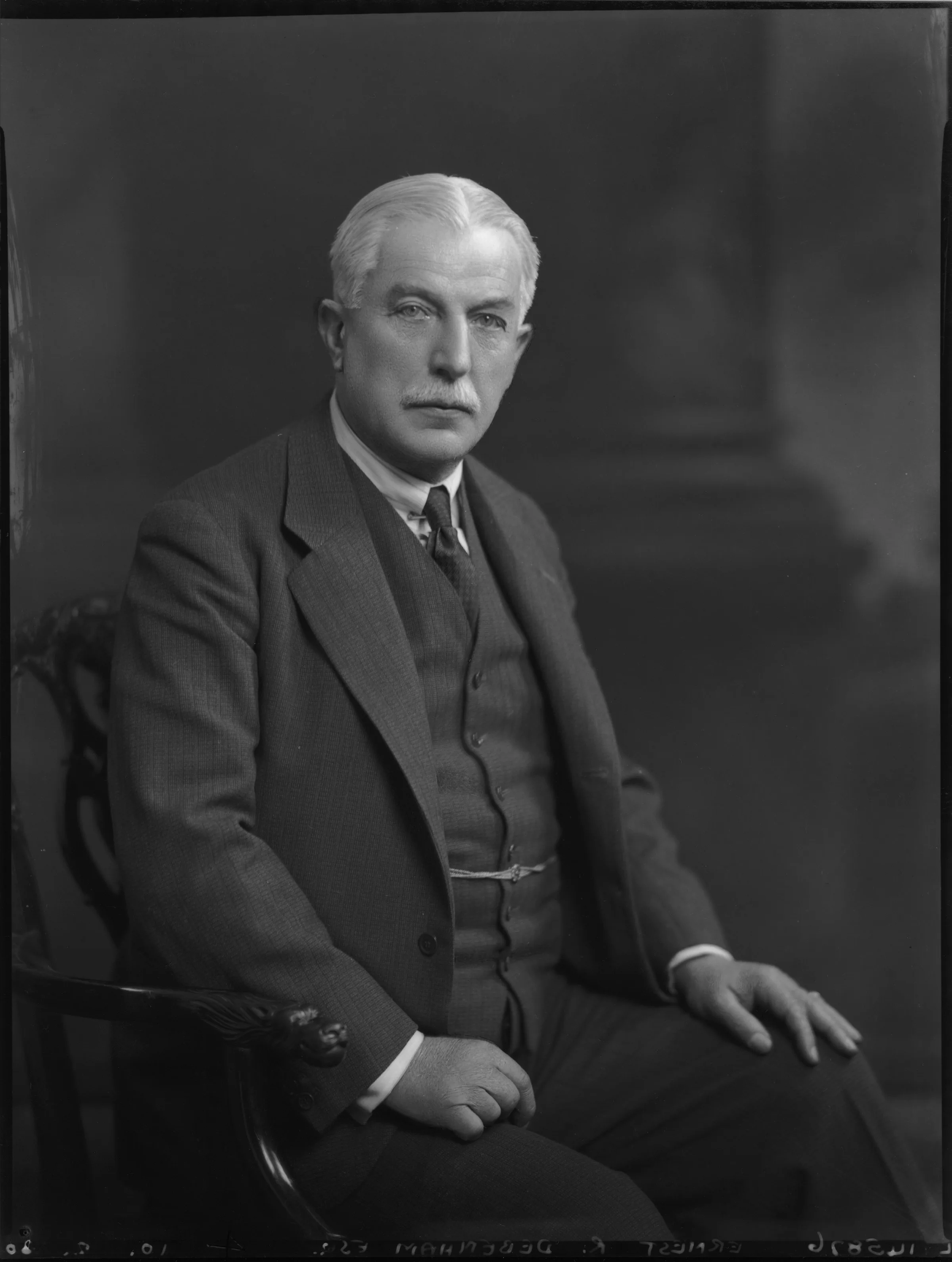
- Debenham in 1930
- Born: Ernest Ridley Debenham; 26 May 1865; Wigmore Street, Marylebone, England
- Died: 25 December 1952 (aged 87); Moor Lane House, Briantspuddle, England
- Occupations: Businessman; Dairy farmer
- Years active: 1892–1927
- Employer: Debenhams Ltd
- Organization: Debenhams
- Known for: Debenhams Ltd; Baronet
- Title: Chair of Debenhams Ltd
- Term: 1892–1927 (retirement)
- Predecessor: William Debenham Jnr
- Successor: Sir Piers Debenham
- Political party: Conservative
- Spouse: Cicely Kenrick (m. 1892; died 1950)
- Children: 8 (including the artist Alison)
- Relatives: William Debenham (grandfather); Sir Piers Debenham; William Kenrick (father-in-law)

Sir Ernest Ridley Debenham, 1st Baronet (26 May 1865 – 25 December 1952), was an English businessman. He was responsible for the considerable expansion of the family's retail and wholesale drapery firm between 1892 and 1927.

== Biography ==
Born at 42 Wigmore Street, Marylebone, he was the son of Frank Debenham and his wife Emma Folkard née Ridley. Educated at Marlborough College and Trinity College, Cambridge,

At the age of 27 he joined the successful business of Debenham & Co., which had been run by his grandfather and father. His restructuring activities led to the splitting of the manufacturing from the retail side of the business, under the name Debenham & Freebody (Freebody was the maiden name of his grandmother). He effected a merger with Marshall & Snelgrove as well as a takeover of Harvey Nichols. He was noted for his paternalistic attitude towards his staff, providing medical and educational support. He was also a pioneer in the dairy industry.

On 8 November 1892 he married Cicely Kenrick (1869–1950), daughter of William Kenrick. The couple had eight children, including the artist Alison Debenham.

Debenham had an interest in politics, and was a supporter of the Conservative Party. Although he considered entering parliament, his business interests prevented this. He did enter local politics, however. He was a member of St Marylebone Borough Council, serving as mayor of the borough in 1910–12. He was also a member of the London County Council. He was elected unopposed at a by-election on 28 February 1912 for the Conservative-backed Municipal Reform party to represent the Marylebone East division, remaining a councillor until 1919.

On his retirement in 1927 he sold most of his shares in the firm for £1.8M, so severing his family's connections with the retail chain that still bears his name. He devoted the rest of his life to dairy farming on his estates in Dorset. He was created a baronet, of Bladen in the County of Dorset, in 1931. He died on Christmas Day 1952 at Moor Lane House, Briantspuddle, Dorset, and was succeeded in the baronetcy by his son, Piers Kenrick Debenham, born in 1904.

Baronetage of the United Kingdom
New creation	Baronet (of Bladen); 1931–1952	Succeeded by Piers Kenrick Debenham
Business positions
Preceded by William Debenham Jnr	Owner of Debenhams; 1892–1927	Succeeded by Piers Debenhams
Preceded by William Debenham Jnr	Chairman of Debenhams; 1892–1927	Succeeded by Piers Debenhams
