= Alison Debenham =

British painter and artist (1903-1967)

- Born: Alison Edith Debenham; 18 February 1903; Holland Park, London, England
- Died: 24 November 1967 (aged 64); London, England
- Education: Slade School of Art
- Known for: Portraiture
- Spouse: René Le Plat (m. 1930)

Alison Edith Debenham (later Le Plat, 18 February 1903 – 24 November 1967) was a British painter and artist.

== Biography ==
Debenham was born in 1903 in London, to Sir Ernest Ridley Debenham, 1st Baronet, and his wife, Lady Cicely, of the Debenhams department store family business. After attending a finishing school in Paris, Alison Debenham studied at the Slade School of Art in London from 1923 to 1926. In 1928 she returned to live in Paris before, in 1929, moving to the south of France where she studied with the French painter Simon Bussy. There she met several prominent artists and authors including André Gide and Henri Matisse and, in 1930, married the artist René Le Plat.

Throughout her artistic career, Debenham mostly painted portraits of friends and family members but also created a series of portraits of the workers on her father's estate. She regularly exhibited in both London and Paris and her first solo exhibition was at the Galerie Vignon in Paris in 1932.

In 1935 Debenham had a solo show at the Zwemmer Gallery in London and for a time she was associated with the Euston Road School of artists. She died in 1967 in London and was survived by her son, Jean-Luc, and daughter, Clarissa. A memorial exhibition for Debenham was held at the Richmond Hill Gallery in 1968 and a further retrospective was mounted by the Belgrave Gallery in London in 1976.
