= Weymouth and Portland Borough Council elections =

Local government elections in Dorset, England

Weymouth and Portland Borough Council in Dorset, England existed from 1974 to 2019. One-third of the council was elected each year, followed by one year where there was an election to Dorset County Council instead. The council was abolished and subsumed into Dorset Council in 2019.

== Political control ==
The first elections to the council were held in 1973, initially operating as a shadow authority prior to the district coming into effect the following year. From 1973 until its abolition in 2019 political control of the council was held by the following parties:

Party in control	Years
Labour	1973–1976
Conservative	1976–1980
No overall control	1980–2019

=== Leadership ===
The role of mayor was largely ceremonial at Weymouth and Portland Borough Council. Until 2016, the council did not formally appoint a leader of the council. Instead, the chair of the management committee represented the council alongside leaders from other councils, and was frequently called the leader in media coverage. In 2016 the chair of the management committee was given the additional title of leader of the council. The chairs of the management committee from 2002 until the council's abolition in 2019 were:

Councillor	Party	From	To
Anne Thomas	Labour	2002	2004
Brian Ellis	Liberal Democrats	2004	2007
Nigel Reed	Conservative	2007	May 2008
Mike Goodman	Conservative	2008	2010
Geoff Petherick	Conservative	2010	May 2011
Mike Goodman	Conservative	2011	2014
Mike Byatt	Labour	2014	May 2015
Ian Bruce	Conservative	May 2015	May 2016
Jeff Cant	Conservative	May 2016	31 Mar 2019

== Party representation ==
Date	Election						Full council					
Date	Con	Lab	LD	Ind	UKIP	Gr	Con	Lab	LD	Ind	UKIP	Gr
Jun 2004	8	9	14	5	–	–	8	9	14	5	–	–
May 2006	5	2	3	2	–	–	11	7	13	5	–	–
Jun 2006	By-Election: LD to Con						12	7	12	5	–	–
May 2007	7	1	3	1	–	–	14	6	11	5	–	–
Feb 2008	Death of councillor						14	6	10	5	–	–
May 2008	4	1	7	1	–	–	16	4	12	4	–	–
2008	Defection: Ind to Con						17	4	12	3	–	–
2008	Defection: LD to Con						18	4	11	3	–	–
Oct 2008	Defection: LD to Con						19	4	10	3	–	–
Dec 2009	By-Election: Con to Lab						18	5	10	3	–	–
May 2010	7	2	2	1	–	–	18	5	11	2	–	–
May 2011	6	3	2	1	–	–	17	7	10	2	–	–
May 2011	Defection: Con to Ind						16	7	10	3	–	–
May 2012	2	6	4	–	–	–	14	11	8	3	–	–
May 2013	By-Election: Con to Lab						13	12	8	3	–	–
May 2014	4	5	1	1	1	–	11	15	7	2	1	–
Mar 2015	Defection: Lab to Ind						11	14	7	3	1	–
May 2015	9	1	1	1	–	–	14	13	6	2	1	–
May 2016	1	7	4	–	–	1	14	12	6	2	1	1
Dec 2016	Defection: Con to Gr						13	12	6	2	1	2
May 2017	By-election: LD to Con						14	12	5	2	1	2
Dec 2017: May 2018	By-election: Ind to Con Defection: UKIP to Con By-election: Gr to Con						16	12	5	2	0	1

== Council elections ==
- 1973 Weymouth and Portland Borough Council election
- 1976 Weymouth and Portland Borough Council election
- 1979 Weymouth and Portland Borough Council election (New ward boundaries)
- 1980 Weymouth and Portland Borough Council election
- 1982 Weymouth and Portland Borough Council election
- 1983 Weymouth and Portland Borough Council election
- 1984 Weymouth and Portland Borough Council election
- 1986 Weymouth and Portland Borough Council election
- 1987 Weymouth and Portland Borough Council election
- 1988 Weymouth and Portland Borough Council election
- 1990 Weymouth and Portland Borough Council election
- 1991 Weymouth and Portland Borough Council election
- 1992 Weymouth and Portland Borough Council election
- 1994 Weymouth and Portland Borough Council election
- 1995 Weymouth and Portland Borough Council election
- 1996 Weymouth and Portland Borough Council election
- 1998 Weymouth and Portland Borough Council election
- 1999 Weymouth and Portland Borough Council election
- 2000 Weymouth and Portland Borough Council election
- 2002 Weymouth and Portland Borough Council election
- 2003 Weymouth and Portland Borough Council election
- 2004 Weymouth and Portland Borough Council election (New ward boundaries)
- 2006 Weymouth and Portland Borough Council election
- 2007 Weymouth and Portland Borough Council election
- 2008 Weymouth and Portland Borough Council election
- 2010 Weymouth and Portland Borough Council election
- 2011 Weymouth and Portland Borough Council election
- 2012 Weymouth and Portland Borough Council election
- 2014 Weymouth and Portland Borough Council election
- 2015 Weymouth and Portland Borough Council election
- 2016 Weymouth and Portland Borough Council election (last election before abolition)

== Borough result maps ==
2004 results map

2006 results map

2007 results map

2008 results map

2010 results map

2011 results map

2012 results map

2014 results map

2015 results map

2016 results map

== By-elections ==
=== 1998-2002 ===
Westham North By-Election 4 October 2001
Party	Candidate	Votes	%	±%
Labour		517	49.9	+19.4
Liberal Democrats		342	33.0	−14.1
Conservative		178	17.2	−5.2
Majority		175	16.9	
Turnout		1,037	27.7	
Labour gain from Liberal Democrats		Swing		

=== 2002-2006 ===
Wey Valley By-Election 14 October 2004
Party	Candidate	Votes	%	±%
Conservative	Kevin Brookes	497	41.3	−1.9
Labour		408	33.9	+1.1
Liberal Democrats		299	24.8	+0.8
Majority		89	7.4	
Turnout		1,204	44.1	
Conservative hold		Swing		

=== 2006-2010 ===
Westham North By-Election 22 June 2006
Party	Candidate	Votes	%	±%
Conservative	Ian Bruce	436	35.0	+11.3
Labour		412	33.1	−5.2
Liberal Democrats	Ray Banham	340	27.3	−10.7
Independent		58	4.7	+4.7
Majority		24	1.9	
Turnout			45.5	
Conservative gain from Liberal Democrats		Swing		

A by-election was held in Wyke Regis ward on 10 December 2009 following the death of councillor Doug Hollings (Conservative).

Wyke Regis By-Election 10 December 2009
Party	Candidate	Votes	%	±%
Labour	Kate Wheller	579	40.1	+3.9
Conservative	Helen Glavin	486	33.7	−30.1
Liberal Democrats	Trefor Morgan	268	18.6	+18.6
Citizen's Action Party	Richard Denton-White	111	7.7	+7.7
Majority		93	6.4	
Turnout		1,444	33.4	
Labour gain from Conservative		Swing		

=== 2010-2014 ===
A by-election was held in Melbombe Regis ward on 16 May 2013 following the death of councillor Peter Farrell (Conservative) in April 2013. Farrell had been elected in May 2012 and so the election was for the period May 2013 to May 2016.

Melbombe Regis By-Election 16 May 2013
Party	Candidate	Votes	%	±%
Labour	Stewart Pearson	279		
Conservative	Andrew Manvell	258		
Independent	James Williamson	204		
Liberal Democrats	Stephanie Taylor	170		
Green	Jonathan Orrell	143		
Majority		21		
Turnout		1,058	21.24	
Labour gain from Conservative		Swing		

=== 2014-2019 ===
A by-election was held in Wey Valley ward on 20 October 2016 following the resignation of Cory Russell (Conservative).

Wey Valley By-Election 20 October 2016
Party	Candidate	Votes	%	±%
Conservative	Tony Ferrari	475	62.3	+0.4
Liberal Democrats	Robin Vaughan	118	15.5	N/A
Labour	Grafton Straker	96	12.6	−9.8
Green	James Askew	74	9.7	−6.1
Majority		357	46.8	
Turnout		764	27.25	
Conservative hold		Swing		

A by-election was held in Westham East ward on 4 May 2017 following the resignation of councillor Sally Maslin (Liberal Democrats).

Westham East By-Election 4 May 2017
Party	Candidate	Votes	%	±%
Conservative	Mike Byatt	294		
Liberal Democrats	Andreas Scheffler	270		
Green	Caz Dennett	260		
Labour	David Joseph Greenhalf	236		
Majority		24		
Turnout				
Conservative gain from Liberal Democrats		Swing		

A by-election was held in Tophill East ward on 8 February 2018 following the resignation of councillor David Hawkins (Independent).

Tophill East By-Election 8 February 2018
Party	Candidate	Votes	%	±%
Conservative	Katharine Garcia	362	46.9	+16.7
Labour	Becky Blake	354	45.9	+23.0
Green	Sara Harpley	56	7.3	−5.3
Majority		8	1.0	
Turnout		772		
Conservative gain from Independent		Swing		

A by-election was held in Tophill West ward on 8 February 2018 following the resignation of councillor Jason Webb (Conservative).

Tophill West By-Election 8 February 2018
Party	Candidate	Votes	%	±%
Conservative	Kerry Baker	511	53.8	+13.7
Labour	Giovanna Lewis	356	37.5	−22.4
Green	Carole Timmons	82	8.6	+8.6
Majority		155	16.3	
Turnout		949		
Conservative hold		Swing		

Green councillor Claudia Moore (Weymouth West, elected as a Conservative) resigned from the council on 20 December 2017. The vacancy was originally going to be left to be filled in the scheduled on-third election on 3 May 2018. However, following the government's approval of the Dorset mergers with first elections 2 May 2019, the election was cancelled and the by-election for Weymouth West was called for 3 May 2018.

Weymouth West By-Election 3 May 2018
Party	Candidate	Votes	%	±%
Conservative	Richard Nickinson	558	39.3	+2.4
Green	Val Graves	508	35.8	+16.2
Labour	David Greenhalf	354	24.9	−18.7
Majority		50	3.5	
Turnout		1,420		
Conservative hold		Swing		
