= 2016 Weymouth and Portland Borough Council election =

2016 UK local government election

Map of the results of the 2016 Weymouth and Portland council election. Labour in red, Liberal Democrats in yellow, Conservatives in blue and Green Party in green. Wards in grey were not contested in 2016.

The 2016 Weymouth and Portland Borough Council election took place on 5 May 2016 to elect members of Weymouth and Portland Borough Council in England. This was on the same day as other local elections.

This result had the following consequences for the total number of seats on the council after the elections:

Party	Previous council	New council
Conservative	14	14
Labour	13	12
Liberal Democrat	6	6
Independent	2	2
UKIP	1	1
Green	0	1
Total	36	36
Working majority	-8	-8

== Ward results ==
=== Littlemoor ===
Littlemoor 2016
Party	Candidate	Votes	%	±%
Labour	Ann Linda Rosina Weaving	392		
Conservative	Clare Louise Williams	222		
Green	John Victor Tomblin	92		
Majority		170		
Labour hold		Swing		

=== Melcombe Regis ===
Melcombe Regis 2016
Party	Candidate	Votes	%	±%
Labour	Tia Roos	450		
Conservative	Shenis Cant	427		
UKIP	John Douglas Morse	349		
Green	Daragh Edwin Croxson	114		
Majority		23		
Labour gain from Conservative		Swing		

Melcombe Regis was won by the Conservative Party in 2012 but taken by the Labour Party in a By-Election on 16 May 2013.

=== Preston ===
Preston 2016
Party	Candidate	Votes	%	±%
Conservative	Ian Cameron Bruce	948		
Liberal Democrats	Robin Malcolm Vaughan	794		
Labour	Elaine Dorothy Walker	270		
Majority		154		
Conservative hold		Swing		

=== Radipole ===
Radipole 2016
Party	Candidate	Votes	%	±%
Liberal Democrats	Ian Roebuck	518		
Conservative	Tony Ferrari	288		
Labour	Kay Susanne Wilcox	182		
Green	Derek Roy Fawell	64		
Majority		230		
Liberal Democrats hold		Swing		

=== Tophill West ===
Tophill West 2016
Party	Candidate	Votes	%	±%
Labour	Ray Nowak	641		
Conservative	Katherine Garcia	429		
Majority		212		
Labour hold		Swing		

=== Underhill ===
Underhill 2016
Party	Candidate	Votes	%	±%
Labour	Sandy West	466		
Conservative	David Hastings	190		
Majority		276		
Labour hold		Swing		

=== Westham East ===
Westham East 2016
Party	Candidate	Votes	%	±%
Liberal Democrats	Sally Maslin	278		
Labour	Mike Byatt	267		
Conservative	Alec Roy Nicholls	165		
Green	James Robert Askew	124		
Majority		11		
Liberal Democrats gain from Labour		Swing		

=== Westham North ===
Westham North 2016
Party	Candidate	Votes	%	±%
Liberal Democrats	Ryan Dean Hope	751		
Labour	Kieron Womble	319		
Conservative	Gary Seymour	275		
Majority		432		
Liberal Democrats hold		Swing		

=== Westham West ===
Westham West 2016
Party	Candidate	Votes	%	±%
Liberal Democrats	Gill Taylor	559		
Labour	Angela Mary McCarthy	216		
Conservative	Michelle Hind	157		
Majority		343		
Liberal Democrats hold		Swing		

=== Weymouth East ===
Weymouth East 2016
Party	Candidate	Votes	%	±%
Green	Jonathan Martin Orrell	573		
Conservative	Peter O'Neill	270		
UKIP	David James Knight	133		
Labour	Tony Prowse	109		
Majority		303		
Green gain from Liberal Democrats		Swing		

=== Weymouth West ===
Weymouth West 2016
Party	Candidate	Votes	%	±%
Labour	Colin John Huckle	644		
Conservative	Richard Douglas Nickinson	545		
Green	Brian Heatley	289		
Majority		99		
Labour hold		Swing		

=== Wyke Regis ===
Wyke Regis 2016 (2 seats)
Party	Candidate	Votes	%	±%
Labour	Kate Wheller	711		
Labour	Lucy Hamilton	564		
Conservative	Andrew Knowles	342		
UKIP	Sybil Drake	301		
Conservative	Kerry Baker	235		
Independent	Steve Cobb	233		
Green	Lee Dalton	134		
Liberal Democrats	Howard Richard Legg	131		
Liberal Democrats	Gillian Pearson	79		
Majority				
Labour hold		Swing		
Labour hold		Swing		

Craig Martin (Labour Party) was elected in 2014 but stood down. As a result, there was an election for two councillors, one to serve from 2016 to 2020 and one to serve from 2016 to 2018.
