= Comben =

Comben is a surname. Notable people with the surname include:

- Aubrey Comben (1904–1972), Australian rules footballer
- Bruce Comben (1930–2002), Australian rules footballer
- John Comben (born 1944), Australian rules footballer
- Pat Comben (born 1950), Australian politician
- Robert Stone Comben (1868–1957), British politician
