= 2011 Weymouth and Portland Borough Council election =

Local election in Dorset

| ← 2010 | 5 May 2011 | 2012 → |

12 of 36 seats to Weymouth and Portland Borough Council 19 seats needed for a majority

| | First party | Second party | Third party |
|---|---|---|---|
| Party | Conservative | Labour | Liberal Democrats |
| Last election | 7 seats, 40.0% | 2 seats, 28.8% | 2 seats, 21.5% |
| Seats before | 7 | 2 | 2 |
| Seats won | 6 | 3 | 2 |
| Seat change | ▼1 | ▲1 | Steady |
| Popular vote | 7,957 | 5,638 | 4,342 |
| Percentage | 41.4% | 29.3% | 22.6% |
| Swing | ▲1.4 pp | ▲0.5 pp | ▲1.1 pp |
- Map showing the results of the 2011 Weymouth and Portland Borough Council election.
Council control before election
No overall control
Council control after election
No overall control

Elections to Weymouth and Portland Borough Council were held on 5 May 2011, alongside other local elections across the United Kingdom. Twelve seats (one-third) of the council was up for election. The council remained in no overall control, with the Conservatives as the largest party.

== Results summary ==
Results
| Party | Votes | Percentage | Seats before | Seats after | Change |
|---|---|---|---|---|---|
| Conservative | 7,957 | 41.4 | 18 | 17 | ▼1 |
| Liberal Democrats | 4,342 | 22.6 | 11 | 10 | ▼1 |
| Labour | 5,638 | 29.3 | 5 | 7 | ▲2 |
| Independent | 1,142 | 5.9 | 2 | 2 | Steady |
| Green | 149 | 0.8 | 0 | 0 | Steady |
| Total | 19,228 | | | | |

== Ward results ==
=== Melcombe Regis ===
Melcombe Regis
| Party | Candidate | Votes | % | ±% |
|---|---|---|---|---|
| Liberal Democrats | Joy Stanley | 748 | | |
| Conservative | Andrew Manvell | 592 | | |
| Labour | Elaine Walker | 365 | | |
| Majority | | 156 | | |
| Turnout | | 1,705 | | |
| Liberal Democrats hold | | | | |

=== Preston ===
Preston
| Party | Candidate | Votes | % | ±% |
|---|---|---|---|---|
| Conservative | Peter Chapman | 1,415 | | |
| Liberal Democrats | Richard Collings | 858 | | |
| Labour | Maureen Drake | 367 | | |
| Majority | | 557 | | |
| Turnout | | 2,640 | | |
| Conservative hold | | | | |

=== Radipole ===
Radipole
| Party | Candidate | Votes | % | ±% |
|---|---|---|---|---|
| Liberal Democrats | Bill White | 764 | | |
| Conservative | Patricia Buckby | 412 | | |
| Labour | James Draper | 243 | | |
| Majority | | 352 | | |
| Turnout | | 1,419 | | |
| Liberal Democrats hold | | | | |

=== Tophill East ===
Tophill East
| Party | Candidate | Votes | % | ±% |
|---|---|---|---|---|
| Independent | David Hawkins | 517 | | |
| Conservative | Richard Paisley | 374 | | |
| Labour | Sandy West | 225 | | |
| Majority | | 143 | | |
| Turnout | | 1,116 | | |
| Independent hold | | | | |

=== Tophill West ===
Tophill West
| Party | Candidate | Votes | % | ±% |
|---|---|---|---|---|
| Conservative | Amanda Munro | 810 | | |
| Labour | Penny McCartney | 749 | | |
| Majority | | 61 | | |
| Turnout | | 1,559 | | |
| Conservative hold | | | | |

=== Upwey and Broadwey ===
Upwey and Broadwey
| Party | Candidate | Votes | % | ±% |
|---|---|---|---|---|
| Conservative | Michael Goodman | 436 | | |
| Liberal Democrats | Roger Genge | 372 | | |
| Labour | Michael Drake | 301 | | |
| Independent | Christopher Steadman | 191 | | |
| Majority | | 64 | | |
| Turnout | | 1,300 | | |
| Conservative hold | | | | |

=== Westham North ===
Westham North
| Party | Candidate | Votes | % | ±% |
|---|---|---|---|---|
| Labour | Andy Blackwood | 666 | | |
| Liberal Democrats | Brendan Webster | 568 | | |
| Conservative | Claire Waghorn | 513 | | |
| Majority | | 98 | | |
| Turnout | | 1,747 | | |
| Labour gain from Liberal Democrats | | | | |

=== Westham West ===
Westham West
| Party | Candidate | Votes | % | ±% |
|---|---|---|---|---|
| Labour | Lucy Hamilton | 461 | | |
| Liberal Democrats | Ryan Hope | 458 | | |
| Conservative | Jean Woodward | 346 | | |
| Majority | | 3 | | |
| Turnout | | 1,265 | | |
| Labour gain from Conservative | | | | |

=== Wey Valley ===
Wey Valley
| Party | Candidate | Votes | % | ±% |
|---|---|---|---|---|
| Conservative | Pamela Nixon | 1,038 | | |
| Labour | Stewart Pearson | 316 | | |
| Green | Brian Heatley | 149 | | |
| Majority | | 722 | | |
| Turnout | | 1,503 | | |
| Conservative hold | | | | |

=== Weymouth East ===
Weymouth East
| Party | Candidate | Votes | % | ±% |
|---|---|---|---|---|
| Conservative | Jane Hall | 548 | | |
| Labour | Rachel Rogers | 421 | | |
| Liberal Democrats | Oz Kanji | 311 | | |
| Majority | | 127 | | |
| Turnout | | 1,280 | | |
| Conservative hold | | | | |

=== Weymouth West ===
Weymouth West
| Party | Candidate | Votes | % | ±% |
|---|---|---|---|---|
| Conservative | Richard Kosier | 766 | | |
| Labour | Colin Huckle | 734 | | |
| Liberal Democrats | Mark Fisher | 263 | | |
| Majority | | 32 | | |
| Turnout | | 1,763 | | |
| Conservative hold | | | | |

=== Wyke Regis ===
Wyke Regis
| Party | Candidate | Votes | % | ±% |
|---|---|---|---|---|
| Labour | Anne Kenwood | 790 | | |
| Conservative | Christopher Latham | 707 | | |
| Independent | Angie Barnes | 434 | | |
| Majority | | 83 | | |
| Turnout | | 1,931 | | |
| Labour hold | | | | |

== See also ==
- Weymouth and Portland Borough Council elections
