= 2015 Weymouth and Portland Borough Council election =

2015 UK local government election

Map of the results of the 2015 Weymouth and Portland council election. Labour in red, Liberal Democrats in yellow, Conservatives in blue and independents in light grey. Wards in grey were not contested in 2015.

The 2015 Weymouth and Portland Borough Council election took place on 7 May 2015 to elect 12 members of Weymouth and Portland Borough Council in England. This was on the same day as the 2015 general election.

The elections saw the Conservative Party gain 3 seats and become the largest party on the council with 14 seats, but without an overall majority. The Labour Party was reduced to 13 seats compared to the 15 they had after the 2014 election.

After the election, the composition of the council was:

- Conservative 14
- Labour 13
- Liberal Democrat 6
- Independent 2
- UKIP 1

== Election result ==
Weymouth and Portland election result 2015
Party	Seats	Gains	Losses	Net gain/loss	Seats %	Votes %	Votes	+/−
Conservative	9	3	0	+3	75.0	40.1	11,352	
Labour	1	0	2	-2	8.3	26.5	7,481	
Liberal Democrats	1	1	2	-1	8.3	11.4	3,233	
Independent	1	0	0	0	8.3	4.9	1,374	
Green	0	0	0	0	0.0	9.4	2,654	
UKIP	0	0	0	0	0.0	7.7	2,188	

Gain/loss is relative to the 2011 results.

== Councillors standing down ==
The following councillors were elected in 2011 and had to seek re-election.

Councillor	Party	Ward
Joy Stanley	Liberal Democrat	Melcombe Regis
Peter Chapman	Conservative	Preston
Bill White	Liberal Democrat	Radipole
David Hawkins	Independent	Tophill East
Amanda Munro	Conservative	Tophill West
Mike Goodman	Conservative	Upwey & Broadwey
Andy Blackwood	Labour	Westham North
Lucy Hamilton	Labour	Westham West
Pam Nixon	Conservative	Wey Valley
Jane Hall	Conservative	Weymouth East
Richard Kosior	Conservative	Weymouth West
Anne Kenwood	Independent (elected as Labour)	Wyke Regis

No elections: Littlemoor, Underhill, Westham East

Anne Kenwood became an independent in March 2015.

== Ward results ==
Melcombe Regis
Party	Candidate	Votes	%	±%
Conservative	Jason Osborne	858		
Labour	Richard Baker	704		
UKIP	John Morse	545		
Liberal Democrats	Alvin Hopper	288		
Green	Benn Harrison	251		
Majority		154		
Turnout			56.65	
Conservative gain from Liberal Democrats		Swing		

Preston
Party	Candidate	Votes	%	±%
Conservative	James Farquharson	2007		
Liberal Democrats	Robin Vaughan	817		
Labour	Maureen Drake	588		
Majority		1190		
Turnout			80.19	
Conservative hold		Swing		

Radipole
Party	Candidate	Votes	%	±%
Conservative	Cathy Page-Nash	662		
Liberal Democrats	Graham Winter	589		
Labour	Kay Wilcox	428		
UKIP	James Stokes	317		
Majority		73		
Turnout			69.14	
Conservative gain from Liberal Democrats		Swing		

Tophill East
Party	Candidate	Votes	%	±%
Independent	David Hawkins	574		
Conservative	Richard Paisley	506		
Labour	Jo Atwell	383		
Green	Susan Sutton	210		
Majority		68		
Turnout			67.71	
Independent hold		Swing		

Tophill West
Party	Candidate	Votes	%	±%
Conservative	Jason Webb	606		
Labour	Jim Draper	561		
UKIP	Tracey Gough	520		
Independent	Sue Lees	327		
Independent	Susan Cocking	252		
Green	Deborah Coleman	166		
Majority		45		
Turnout			64.30	
Conservative hold		Swing		

Upwey and Broadwey
Party	Candidate	Votes	%	±%
Conservative	John Ellis	1056		
Labour	Kieron Womble	634		
Green	David Smith	342		
Majority		422		
Turnout			75.27	
Conservative hold		Swing		

Westham North
Party	Candidate	Votes	%	±%
Liberal Democrats	Oz Kanji	1007		
Labour	Pete Barrow	837		
Conservative	Alec Nicholls	780		
Majority		170		
Turnout			63.76	
Liberal Democrats gain from Labour		Swing		

Westham West
Party	Candidate	Votes	%	±%
Labour	Andy Blackwood	673		
Conservative	Lesley Nicholls	617		
Liberal Democrats	Anne Kenwood	532		
Majority		56		
Turnout			63.75	
Labour hold		Swing		

Wey Valley
Party	Candidate	Votes	%	±%
Conservative	Pamela Nixon	1326		
Labour	Pat Dunne	480		
Green	Brian Heatley	339		
Majority		846		
Turnout			74.77	
Conservative hold		Swing		

Weymouth East
Party	Candidate	Votes	%	±%
Conservative	Alison Reed	666		
Green	Clare Sutton	501		
Labour	Maria Blackwood	338		
UKIP	Sybil Drake	257		
Majority		165		
Turnout			65.23	
Conservative hold		Swing		

Weymouth West
Party	Candidate	Votes	%	±%
Conservative	Richard Kosior	1231		
Labour	Hazel Priest	934		
Green	Jon Orrell	624		
Majority		297		
Turnout			71.08	
Conservative hold		Swing		

Wyke Regis
Party	Candidate	Votes	%	±%
Conservative	Jeff Cant	1037		
Labour	Lucy Hamilton	921		
UKIP	Jill Hordle	549		
Independent	Tim Griffiths	221		
Green	Edward Preece	221		
Majority		116		
Turnout			68.42	
Conservative gain from Labour		Swing		
