= South Dorset by-election =

South Dorset by-election may refer to:

- 1891 South Dorset by-election
- 1941 South Dorset by-election
- 1962 South Dorset by-election
