= 2000 Weymouth and Portland Borough Council election =

2000 UK local government election

Elections to Weymouth and Portland Borough Council were held on 4 May 2000. One third of the council was up for election and the council stayed under no overall control.

After the election, the composition of the council was

- Labour 13
- Liberal Democrat 12
- Conservative 5
- Independent 5

== Election result ==
Weymouth and Portland local election result 2000
Party	Seats	Gains	Losses	Net gain/loss	Seats %	Votes %	Votes	+/−
Liberal Democrats	4			0	36.4			
Conservative	4			+2	36.4			
Labour	2			-2	18.2			
Independent	1			0	9.1			
