= Charles J. T. Hambro =

British Conservative politician

Charles Joseph Hambro
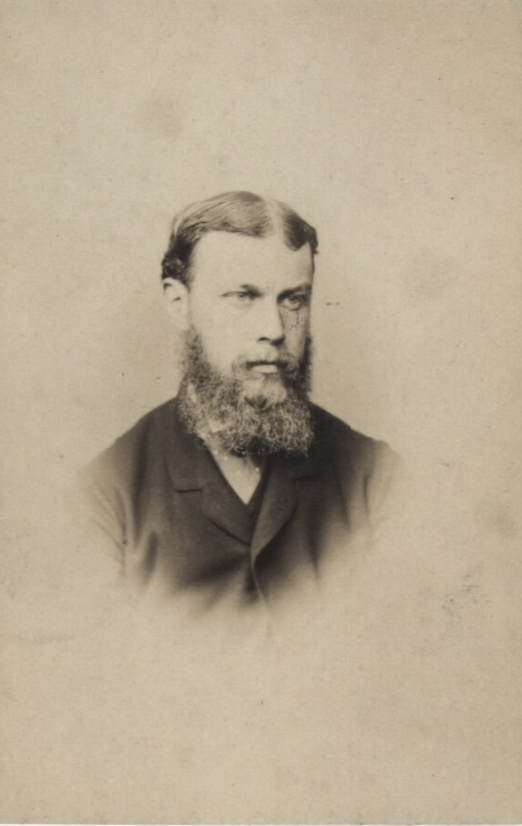
- Hambro photographed by Maull & Polyblank
- Born: 2 October 1834; Copenhagen, Denmark
- Died: 11 April 1891 (aged 56)
- Occupation: Banker

Charles Joseph Theophilus Hambro (2 October 1834 – 11 April 1891) was a British Conservative Party politician. He was born in Copenhagen, Denmark, but was a British Subject.

Hambro was the eldest son of Carl Joachim Hambro, Baron Hambro of Milton Abbey, Dorset and educated at Trinity College, Cambridge. He was called to the Bar at the Inner Temple in 1860.

He held the offices of Deputy Lieutenant (D.L.) of Dorset and of Justice of the Peace (J.P.) for Dorset. He was elected as member of parliament (MP) for Weymouth and Melcombe Regis at the 1868 general election, but lost the seat at the 1874 general election. He gained the rank of Colonel in the service of the Dorset Yeomanry Cavalry. He held the office of High Sheriff of Dorset in 1882. Hambro did not stand for Parliament again until the 1885 general election, when he narrowly failed to win the newly created Southern division of Dorset (his Liberal opponent had a majority of only 0.6% of the votes). However he won the seat at the 1886 general election, and held it until his death in 1891 aged 56.

He inherited and lived at Milton Abbey.

== Family ==
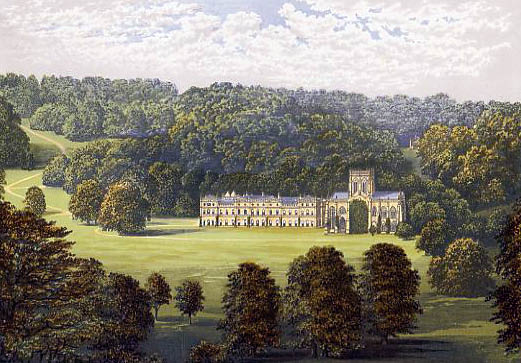
Milton Abbey, late 1800s

He married Susan Amelia Yorke, youngest daughter of the Honorable and Venerable Rev. Henry Reginald Yorke, Archdeacon of Huntingdon on 15 December 1857 in the Church of St Andrew, Wimpole, Cambridgeshire, England
They had two daughters :
Agneta Josephine (Hambro) de Sales La Terrierre (1864–1939).
Carolina Susan (Hambro) Parry-Okeden (1859–1931).

Parliament of the United Kingdom
Preceded by Robert Brooks; Henry Edwards	Member of Parliament for Weymouth & Melcombe Regis; 1868 – 1874; With: Henry Edwards	Succeeded by Sir Frederick Johnstone; Henry Edwards
Preceded by Henry Parkman Sturgis	Member of Parliament for South Dorset; 1886 – 1891	Succeeded by William Brymer
