= 1999 Weymouth and Portland Borough Council election =

1999 UK local government election

Elections to Weymouth and Portland Borough Council were held on 6 May 1999. One third of the council was up for election and the council stayed under no overall control.

After the election, the composition of the council was

- Labour 15
- Liberal Democrat 12
- Independent 6
- Conservative 2

== Election result ==
Weymouth and Portland local election result 1999
Party	Seats	Gains	Losses	Net gain/loss	Seats %	Votes %	Votes	+/−
Labour	6			-1	46.2			
Liberal Democrats	3			-1	23.1			
Conservative	2			+2	15.4			
Independent	2			0	15.4			
