= 1998 Weymouth and Portland Borough Council election =

1998 UK local government election

The 1998 Weymouth and Portland Borough Council election took place on 7 May 1998 to elect members of Weymouth and Portland District Council in Dorset, England. One third of the council was up for election and the council stayed under no overall control.

After the election, the composition of the council was

- Labour 16
- Liberal Democrat 13
- Independent 4
- Residents 2

== Election result ==
Weymouth and Portland local election result 1998
Party	Seats	Gains	Losses	Net gain/loss	Seats %	Votes %	Votes	+/−
Labour	5			+1	41.7			
Liberal Democrats	5			0	41.7			
Independent	2			-1	16.7			
