= 2014 Weymouth and Portland Borough Council election =

2014 UK local government election

Map of the results of the 2014 Weymouth and Portland council election. Labour in red, Liberal Democrats in yellow, Conservatives in blue, UK Independence Party in purple and independents in light grey. Wards in grey were not contested in 2014.

The 2014 Weymouth and Portland Borough Council election took place on 22 May 2014 to elect members of Weymouth and Portland Borough Council in England. This was on the same day as other local elections.

The elections saw the Labour Party gain 3 seats and become the largest party on the council with 15 seats, but without an overall majority. The Conservative Party was reduced to 11 seats compared to the 14 they had after the 2012 election.

After the election, the composition of the council was:

- Labour 15
- Conservative 11
- Liberal Democrat 7
- Independent 2
- UKIP 1

== Election result ==
Weymouth and Portland election result 2014
Party	Seats	Gains	Losses	Net gain/loss	Seats %	Votes %	Votes	+/−
Labour	5	3	0	+3	41.7	29.6	4,485	
Conservative	4	0	3	-3	33.3	27.7	4,209	
Liberal Democrats	1	0	1	-1	8.3	14.3	2,171	
UKIP	1	1	0	+1	8.3	12.4	1,888	
Independent	1	0	0	0	8.3	3.4	516	
Green	0	0	0	0	0.0	12.5	1,902	

Gain/loss is relative to the 2010 results.

== Councillors standing down ==
The following councillors were elected in 2010 and had to seek re-election.

Ward	Councillor	Party
Littlemoor	Mark Tewkesbury	Labour
Melcombe Regis	Raymond Banham	Liberal Democrat
Preston	Hazel Bruce	Conservative
Tophill East	Margaret Leicester	Independent
Tophill West	Ian Munro-Price	Conservative
Underhill	Paul Kimber	Labour
Upwey and Broadwey	Robert Dunster	Conservative
Westham East	Ian James	Conservative
Westham North	Christine James	Liberal Democrat
Wey Valley	Kevin Hodder	Conservative
Weymouth West	Dominic Lonsdale	Conservative
Wyke Regis	Geoffrey Petherick	Independent (elected as Conservative)

No elections: Radipole, Westham West, Weymouth East

Geoff Petherick became an independent in May 2011.

== Ward results ==
Littlemoor
Party	Candidate	Votes	%	±%
Labour	Mark Tewkesbury	474	56.2	
UKIP	Sandra Cobb	224	26.5	
Conservative	John Ellis	146	17.3	
Majority		250		
Turnout			32.64	
Labour hold		Swing		

Melcombe Regis
Party	Candidate	Votes	%	±%
UKIP	Francis Drake	312	24.8	
Conservative	Roger Costello	297	23.6	
Labour	Dan Brember	268	21.3	
Liberal Democrats	Ray Banham	250	19.9	
Green	Jonathan Orrell	131	10.4	
Majority		15		
Turnout			27.32	
UKIP gain from Liberal Democrats		Swing		

Preston
Party	Candidate	Votes	%	±%
Conservative	Hazel Bruce	918	38.2	
Liberal Democrats	Howard Legg	570	23.7	
UKIP	Steve Cobb	530	22.1	
Labour	Maureen Drake	260	10.8	
Green	John Tomblin	124	5.2	
Majority		348		
Turnout			55.46	
Conservative hold		Swing		

Tophill East
Party	Candidate	Votes	%	±%
Independent	Margaret Leicester	253	27.8	
UKIP	Alan Ackroyd	225	24.7	
Labour	Jim Draper	209	23.0	
Conservative	Richard Paisley	169	18.6	
Green	Benn Harrison	54	5.9	
Majority		28		
Turnout			36.87	
Independent hold		Swing		

Tophill West
Party	Candidate	Votes	%	±%
Labour	Penny McCartney	426	33.2	
Conservative	Alec Nicholls	346	26.9	
Liberal Democrats	Sue Lees	268	20.9	
Green	Susan Sutton	245	19.1	
Majority		80		
Turnout			34.26	
Labour gain from Conservative		Swing		

Underhill
Party	Candidate	Votes	%	±%
Labour	Paul Kimber	473	59.7	
UKIP	Tracey Gough	319	40.3	
Majority		154		
Turnout			30.12	
Labour hold		Swing		

Upwey and Broadwey
Party	Candidate	Votes	%	±%
Conservative	Kevin Brookes	406	34.4	
Labour	Kieron Womble	364	30.8	
UKIP	John Morse	278	23.5	
Green	David Smith	133	11.3	
Majority		42		
Turnout			41.25	
Conservative hold		Swing		

Westham East
Party	Candidate	Votes	%	±%
Labour	Gareth Rockingham	367	42.2	
Liberal Democrats	Oz Kanji	275	31.6	
Conservative	Jean Woodward	228	26.2	
Majority		92		
Turnout			32.43	
Labour gain from Conservative		Swing		

Westham North
Party	Candidate	Votes	%	±%
Liberal Democrats	Christine James	808	59.2	
Labour	Pete Barrow	558	40.8	
Majority		250		
Turnout			34.27	
Liberal Democrats hold		Swing		

Wey Valley
Party	Candidate	Votes	%	±%
Conservative	Cory Russell	630	54.6	
Green	Brian Heatley	523	45.4	
Majority		107		
Turnout			40.54	
Conservative hold		Swing		

Weymouth West
Party	Candidate	Votes	%	±%
Conservative	Claudia Webb	541	34.2	
Labour	Tashi Warr	536	33.9	
Green	Claire Sutton	504	31.9	
Majority		5		
Turnout			40.90	
Conservative hold		Swing		

Wyke Regis
Party	Candidate	Votes	%	±%
Labour	Craig Martin	550	36.0	
Conservative	Christopher Mallen	528	34.5	
Independent	Mark Griffiths	263	17.2	
Green	Leslie Dalton	188	12.3	
Majority		22		
Turnout			35.94	
Labour gain from Conservative		Swing		
