= 2004 Weymouth and Portland Borough Council election =

2004 UK local government election

Results of the 2004 Weymouth and Portland Borough Council election

Elections to Weymouth and Portland Borough Council were held on 10 June 2004. The whole council was up for election with boundary changes since the last election in 2003 increasing the number of seats by 1. The council stayed under no overall control.

== Election result ==
Weymouth and Portland local election result 2004
Party	Seats	Gains	Losses	Net gain/loss	Seats %	Votes %	Votes	+/−
Liberal Democrats	14			+3	38.9	32.0	14,726	+2.8%
Labour	9			-4	25.0	27.9	12,849	-3.5%
Conservative	8			+2	22.2	28.8	13,264	+9.1%
Independent	5			0	13.9	9.0	4,145	-7.2%
UKIP	0			0	0	2.2	1,030	-1.3%

== Ward results ==
Littlemoor (2)
Party	Candidate	Votes	%	±%
Labour	Simon Bowkett	430		
Labour	Mary Tewkesbury	401		
Conservative	Ashley Newman	319		
Turnout		1,150	33.1	

Melcombe Regis (3)
Party	Candidate	Votes	%	±%
Liberal Democrats	Peter Farrell	705		
Liberal Democrats	Joy Stanley	671		
Liberal Democrats	Lynne Herbert	628		
Conservative	Barbara Bonser	415		
Conservative	Lyn Graham	402		
Conservative	Derek Model	378		
Labour	Stephen James	236		
Labour	Margaret Baker	211		
Labour	Mary McHugh	206		
UKIP	Gordon Lake	180		
UKIP	Roy Child	174		
UKIP	Alvin Hopper	171		
Independent	Victor Hamilton	48		
Turnout		4,425	35.0	

Preston (3)
Party	Candidate	Votes	%	±%
Liberal Democrats	Brian Ellis	1,488		
Liberal Democrats	David Mannings	1,209		
Liberal Democrats	Richard Collings	1,144		
Conservative	Hazel Bruce	1,088		
Conservative	Mark Johnson	883		
Conservative	Kevin Brookes	849		
Labour	Maureen Drake	184		
Labour	Richard Besant	151		
Labour	Gareth Thomas	138		
Turnout		7,134	60.1	

Radipole (2)
Party	Candidate	Votes	%	±%
Liberal Democrats	George Molyneux	677		
Liberal Democrats	William White	656		
Conservative	George Granycome	475		
Conservative	Vivian Schofield	427		
Labour	Lorna Byatt	156		
Labour	Stewart Pearson	144		
Turnout		2,535	46.8	

Tophill East (2)
Party	Candidate	Votes	%	±%
Independent	Jacqueline Redfern	492		
Independent	Margaret Leicester	363		
Independent	James Holt	335		
Labour	James Draper	181		
Conservative	Timothy Simmons	175		
Labour	Rosemary Smith	97		
Turnout		1,643	39.4	

Tophill West (3)
Party	Candidate	Votes	%	±%
Independent	Leslie Ames	946		
Conservative	Raymond Nash	527		
Independent	David Hawkins	412		
Labour	Timothy Woodcock	338		
Conservative	Reginald Strong	302		
Labour	Carole Weaver	270		
Labour	Gillian Demuth	255		
Independent	William Burge	249		
Turnout		3,299	37.8	

Underhill (2)
Party	Candidate	Votes	%	±%
Independent	Timothy Munro	427		
Labour	Paul Kimber	363		
Labour	Sandra West	269		
Independent	Elspie Price	205		
Conservative	Jerry Hepburn	167		
Turnout		1,432	33.3	

Upwey and Broadwey (2)
Party	Candidate	Votes	%	±%
Conservative	Michael Goodman	561		
Conservative	Robert Dunster	417		
Liberal Democrats	Daphne Grout-Smith	351		
Labour	Suzanne Hutton	328		
Labour	Elaine Walker	310		
Turnout		1,967	42.2	

Westham East (2)
Party	Candidate	Votes	%	±%
Liberal Democrats	Howard Legg	508		
Liberal Democrats	Ian James	487		
Labour	David Dowle	229		
Conservative	Andrew Cooke	211		
Labour	Lorraine Rodgers	207		
Turnout		1,642	37.6	

Westham North (3)
Party	Candidate	Votes	%	±%
Liberal Democrats	David Harris	901		
Labour	Andrew Hutchings	708		
Liberal Democrats	Christine James	702		
Liberal Democrats	Michael Phillips	693		
Labour	Michael Byatt	490		
Labour	Lindsay Drage	425		
Conservative	George Afentakis	375		
Turnout		4,294	43.7	

Westham West (2)
Party	Candidate	Votes	%	±%
Labour	Kathleen Wheller	487		
Liberal Democrats	Jennifer Stewkesbury	482		
Labour	Christopher Cook	447		
Liberal Democrats	Gillian Taylor	425		
Conservative	Andrew Shutlar	301		
Turnout		2,142	45.2	

Wey Valley (2)
Party	Candidate	Votes	%	±%
Conservative	Ian Strong	658		
Conservative	Alison Scott	656		
Labour	Sharon Mitchell	500		
Labour	Jonathan Robbins	469		
Liberal Democrats	Jennifer Harris	365		
Turnout		2,648	53.5	

Weymouth East (2)
Party	Candidate	Votes	%	±%
Conservative	Nigel Reed	459		
Liberal Democrats	John Birtwistle	456		
Conservative	Samantha Lindley	432		
Liberal Democrats	Ann Comely	378		
Labour	Anthony Reed	229		
Labour	James Kimber	223		
Turnout		2,177	42.2	

Weymouth West (3)
Party	Candidate	Votes	%	±%
Labour	Kay Wilcox	672		
Labour	Andrew Blackwood	659		
Labour	Antony Prowse	585		
Conservative	Peter O'Neill	584		
Conservative	Nicholas Wyness	552		
Liberal Democrats	Derek Julian	527		
UKIP	Hugh Chalker	505		
Liberal Democrats	Lydia Roe	428		
Liberal Democrats	Roger Gifford	388		
Turnout		4,900	47.3	

Wyke Regis (3)
Party	Candidate	Votes	%	±%
Conservative	Douglas Hollings	949		
Conservative	Margaret Alsop	702		
Labour	Anne Kenwood	688		
Independent	Jack Biggs	668		
Labour	Bruce Bonwell	582		
Labour	Richard Phelps	581		
Liberal Democrats	Peter Roe	448		
Turnout		4,618	45.7	
