= 1891 South Dorset by-election =

UK parliamentary by-election

The 1891 South Dorset by-election for the UK Parliament was held on 7 May 1891 after the death of the incumbent Conservative MP Charles J. T. Hambro. The seat was retained by the Conservative candidate William Brymer.

== Result ==
South Dorset by-election, 1891
Party	Candidate	Votes	%	±%
Conservative	William Brymer	3,284	50.3	−8.0
Liberal	Robert Edgcumbe	3,244	49.7	+8.0
Majority		40	0.6	−16.0
Turnout		6,528	84.0	+2.5
Conservative hold		Swing	-8.0	
