= 2002 Weymouth and Portland Borough Council election =

2002 UK local government election

Elections to Weymouth and Portland Borough Council were held on 2 May 2002. One third of the council was up for election and the council stayed under no overall control.

After the election, the composition of the council was

- Labour 14
- Liberal Democrat 11
- Conservative 6
- Independent 4

== Election result ==
Weymouth and Portland local election result 2002
Party	Seats	Gains	Losses	Net gain/loss	Seats %	Votes %	Votes	+/−
Labour	6	1	1	0	50.0	38.5	5,714	
Liberal Democrats	4	0	0	0	33.3	23.8	3,528	
Conservative	1	1	0	+1	8.3	32.9	4,889	
Independent	1	0	1	-1	8.3	4.9	722	

== Ward results ==
Melcombe Regis
Party	Candidate	Votes	%	±%
Liberal Democrats	Joy Stanley	676	61.5	
Conservative	Jacqueline Treanor	264	24.0	
Labour	Mary McHugh	159	14.5	
Majority		412	37.5	
Turnout		1,099	30.2	
Liberal Democrats hold		Swing		

North
Party	Candidate	Votes	%	±%
Liberal Democrats	Graham Winter	510	42.1	
Conservative	George Granycome	410	33.9	
Labour	Peter Follows	290	24.0	
Majority		100	8.2	
Turnout		1,210	44.1	
Liberal Democrats hold		Swing		

North Central
Party	Candidate	Votes	%	±%
Labour	John West	1,021	61.4	
Conservative	John Knipe	642	38.6	
Majority		379	22.8	
Turnout		1,663	31.1	
Labour hold		Swing		

Preston
Party	Candidate	Votes	%	±%
Liberal Democrats	Brian Ellis	1,125	51.2	
Conservative	Simon Emblen	898	40.9	
Labour	Susan Luxford	175	8.0	
Majority		227	10.3	
Turnout		2,198	51.5	
Liberal Democrats hold		Swing		

Tophill East
Party	Candidate	Votes	%	±%
Independent	James Holt	412	54.6	
Labour	James Draper	194	25.7	
Conservative	Tracy Thomson	149	19.7	
Majority		218	28.9	
Turnout		755	31.3	
Independent hold		Swing		

Tophill West
Party	Candidate	Votes	%	±%
Labour	Timothy Woodcock	441	52.3	
Conservative	Susan Taylor	403	47.7	
Majority		38	4.6	
Turnout		844	21.1	
Labour gain from Independent		Swing		

Underhill
Party	Candidate	Votes	%	±%
Labour	Paul Kimber	406	68.5	
Conservative	Timothy Munro	187	31.5	
Majority		219	37.0	
Turnout		593	25.9	
Labour hold		Swing		

Westham North
Party	Candidate	Votes	%	±%
Liberal Democrats	David Harris	766	56.5	
Labour	Lindsay Drage	372	27.5	
Conservative	John Scott	217	16.0	
Majority		394	29.0	
Turnout		1,355	36.5	
Liberal Democrats hold		Swing		

Westham West
Party	Candidate	Votes	%	±%
Labour	Kathleen Wheller	528	53.9	
Liberal Democrats	Lawrence Adams	451	46.1	
Majority		77	7.8	
Turnout		979	40.4	
Labour hold		Swing		

Weymouth East
Party	Candidate	Votes	%	±%
Conservative	Samantha Braund	547	54.3	
Labour	Antony Prowse	460	45.7	
Majority		87	8.6	
Turnout		1,007	37.1	
Conservative gain from Labour		Swing		

Weymouth West
Party	Candidate	Votes	%	±%
Labour	Andrew Blackwood	920	61.1	
Conservative	John Biggs	586	38.9	
Majority		334	22.2	
Turnout		1,506	36.7	
Labour hold		Swing		

Wyke Regis
Party	Candidate	Votes	%	±%
Labour	Anne Kenwood	748	45.5	
Conservative	Douglas Swanson	586	35.6	
Independent	Jack Biggs	310	18.9	
Majority		162	9.9	
Turnout		1,644	39.3	
Labour hold		Swing		
