= Jim Knight =

British Labour Co-op politician (born 1965)

The Right Honourable The Lord Knight of Weymouth PC FRSA
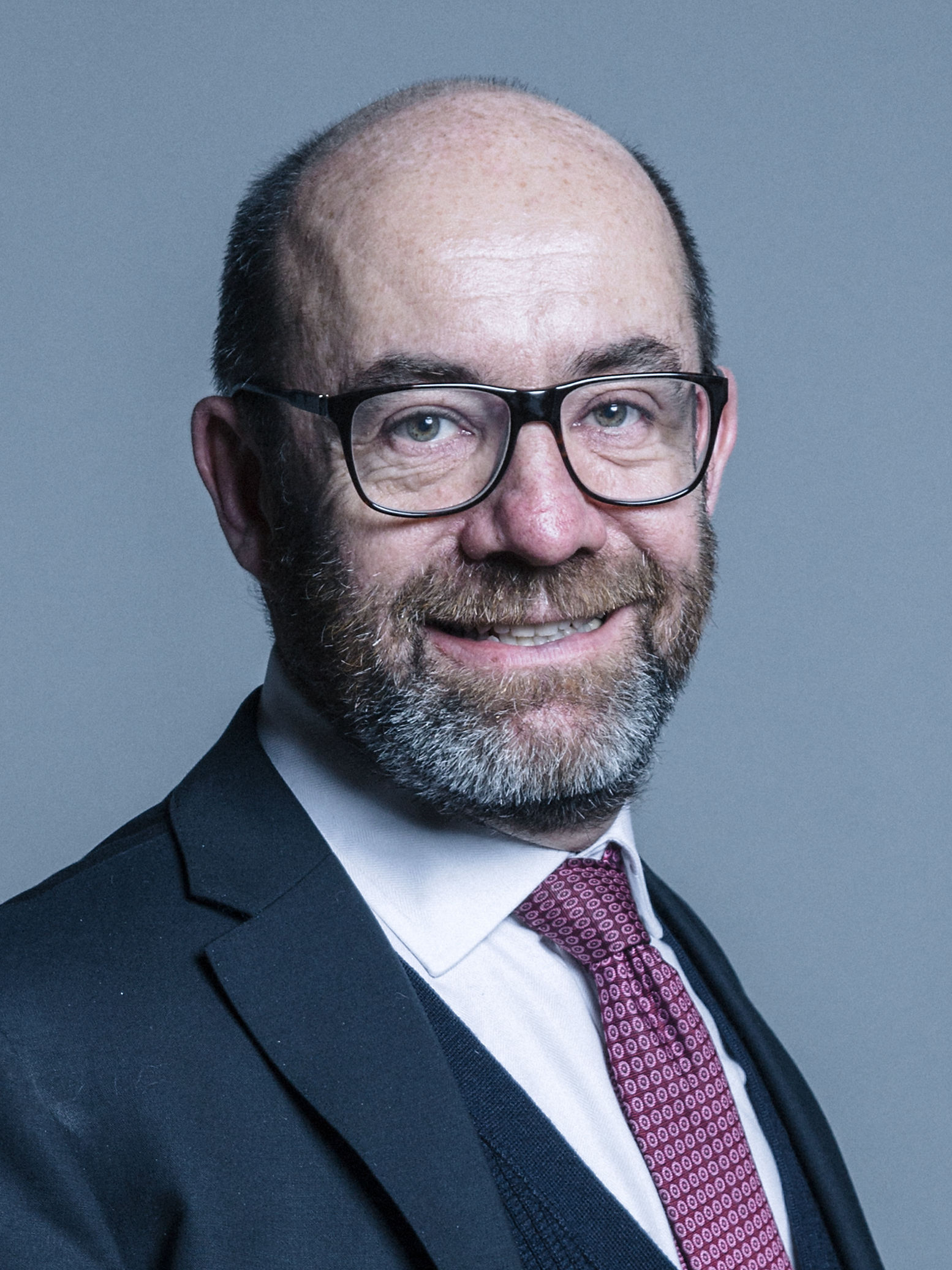
- Official portrait, 2018

Minister of State for Employment and Welfare Reform
- In office 5 June 2009 – 11 May 2010
- Prime Minister: Gordon Brown
- Preceded by: Tony McNulty
- Succeeded by: Chris Grayling (Employment); The Lord Freud (Welfare Reform)

Minister for the South West
- In office 5 June 2009 – 11 May 2010
- Prime Minister: Gordon Brown
- Preceded by: Ben Bradshaw
- Succeeded by: Position abolished

Minister of State for Schools and Learning
- In office 5 May 2006 – 5 June 2009
- Prime Minister: Tony Blair; Gordon Brown
- Preceded by: Jacqui Smith
- Succeeded by: Vernon Coaker

Parliamentary Under Secretary of State for Biodiversity, Landscape and Rural Affairs
- In office 6 May 2005 – 5 May 2006
- Prime Minister: Tony Blair
- Preceded by: Alun Michael
- Succeeded by: Barry Gardiner
Parliamentary offices
Member of the House of Lords
Lord Temporal
Life peerage 23 June 2010
Member of Parliament for South Dorset
In office 7 June 2001 – 12 April 2010
| Preceded by | Ian Bruce |
| Succeeded by | Richard Drax |

Personal details
- Born: 6 March 1965 (age 61) Bexley, England
- Party: Labour and Co-operative
- Education: Fitzwilliam College, Cambridge
- Knight's voice recorded in July 2013

James Philip Knight, Baron Knight of Weymouth, PC, FRSA (born 6 March 1965) is a British politician who served as Minister for the South West and Minister of State for Employment and Welfare Reform from 2009 to 2010. A member of the Labour Party and Co-operative Party, he was Member of Parliament (MP) for South Dorset from 2001 to 2010.

After losing his seat to Richard Drax of the Conservative Party, it was announced Knight would be made a life peer in the 2010 Dissolution Honours. He worked at TES Global Ltd from 2014 to 2021 as Chief Education Officer, as well as becoming visiting professor at the London Knowledge Lab of the Institute of Education in London.

== Education ==
Knight was educated at Eltham College, an independent school in Mottingham in south east London, followed by Fitzwilliam College, Cambridge, where he studied geography and social & political sciences from 1984 to 1987, gaining a BA Hons.

== Early career ==
Knight was manager of Central Studio, the arts centre of Queen Mary's College, Basingstoke, from 1988 to 1990. From 1990 to 1991, he was director of West Wiltshire Arts Centre Ltd, then director of Dentons Directories Ltd in Westbury from 1991 to 2001.

== Election history ==
Knight first stood for Parliament at the 1997 general election as the Labour Party candidate for South Dorset, but narrowly lost by just 77 votes. He was, however, elected on the same day to Mendip District Council, on which he served until 2001; including as Labour group leader.

At the 2001 general election, he was elected as the Member of Parliament for South Dorset by 153 votes in the only Labour gain from the Conservatives that year. At the 2005 general election, Knight increased his majority to 1,812 votes, but with a small decrease in his share of the vote. At the 2010 general election, Knight lost his seat to Conservative Richard Drax by 7,443 votes after an 11.4% drop in his share of the vote.

Knight was the campaign co-ordinator for Ed Balls's unsuccessful Labour Party leadership campaign in 2010.

== Parliamentary career ==
Knight was Parliamentary Under-Secretary of State for Rural Affairs, Landscape and Biodiversity in the Department for Environment, Food and Rural Affairs from 2005 to 2006. He then moved to become Minister of State for Schools in the Department for Education and Skills. On 28 June 2007, when Gordon Brown disbanded the department, Knight moved to the newly created Department for Children, Schools and Families, as the Minister for Schools and Learners. In October 2008 following the reshuffle, Knight became a member of the Privy Council.

In 2009, when MPs expenses were revealed following a leak in the Daily Telegraph, Knight was ranked 171 out of 645 in the MPs' expenses list, claiming £155,987 in 2007/2008, compared with £137,970 in 2006/2007, of which £94,135 was for staff, £9,746 was for a communications allowance and £4,993 was for personal living expenses.

In his first Parliament, Jim Knight generally voted in line with party policy, including all major votes such as those on the Iraq war and top-up fees.

Jim Knight held the following positions:

- 2003–2004 – Parliamentary Private Secretary to Rosie Winterton then Minister of State at the Department of Health
- 2004–2005 – Parliamentary Private Secretary to the Ministerial Team at the Department of Health
- 2005–2006 – Parliamentary under Secretary of State for Rural Affairs, the Landscape & Biodiversity
- 2006–2009 – Minister of State for Schools
- 2009–2010 – Minister of State for Employment
- 2009–2010 – Minister for the South West

== After politics ==
Knight was created a life peer on 23 June 2010, taking the title Baron Knight of Weymouth, of Weymouth in the County of Dorset.

In April 2014 he stepped down from the Labour front bench in the House of Lords to take up a full-time role as managing director, online learning at TES Global Ltd, building an online professional development and training service for teachers. Knight was subsequently appointed chief education and external officer at TES Global, where he successfully co-founded Tes Institute, the fifth largest qualifier of teachers in the country and managed Tes Resources and the Comms function. He left Tes in March 2021.

In 2011, Knight was appointed as chair of digital and social inclusion charity Tinder Foundation (now Good Things Foundation). He stood down as chair in 2016 but remains a patron of the Technology, Pedagogy and Education professional association. He is now Chair Emeritus of the Digital Poverty Alliance and co-owner of XRapid, an app that diagnoses malaria and is a board member of Apps for Good. He is also the deputy chair of the Nominet Trust, and an honorary associate of the National Secular Society. He became Chair of the Board of STEM Learning in July 2024.

In a 2026 House of Lords debate ("Artificial Intelligence: Impact on Human Relationships and Society"), Knight declared interests in artificial intelligence firms Century-Tech and Goodnotes.

Parliament of the United Kingdom
| Preceded by Ian Bruce | Member of Parliament for South Dorset; 2001–2010 | Succeeded by Richard Drax |
Political offices
| Preceded by Jacqui Smith | Minister of State for Schools and Learners; 2006–2009 | Succeeded by Vernon Coaker |
| Preceded by Tony McNulty | Minister of State for Employment and Welfare Reform; 2009–2010 | Succeeded by Chris Grayling |
| Preceded by Ben Bradshaw | Minister for the South West; 2009–2010 | Position abolished |
Orders of precedence in the United Kingdom
| Preceded by The Lord Kennedy of Southwark | Gentlemen; Baron Knight of Weymouth | Followed by The Lord Gardiner of Kimble |
