= List of boroughs in Dorset =

The following were historically ancient boroughs in the county of Dorset.

== Boroughs, pre-Conquest ==
- Bridport
- Dorchester
- Shaftesbury
- Wareham
- Wimborne Minster (see also Lapsed boroughs below)

== Boroughs, post-Conquest ==
- Blandford Forum (from 1605)
- Corfe Castle (from 1268 or 1576)
- Lyme Regis (from 1284 or -85)
- Melcombe Regis (from 1268)
- Poole (from 1248; a County of itself from 1571)
- Sherborne (from 1227)
- Weymouth (from 1252)

(Weymouth and Melcombe Regis were joined as a double borough in 1571)

== "Lapsed" boroughs ==
- Castleton (in Oborne)
- Charmouth
- Newton (in Studland)
- Stoborough (in Wareham Holy Trinity)
- Whitchurch Canonicorum
- Wimborne Minster

== Sources ==
- Boswell, Edward, 1833: The Civil Division of the County of Dorset (published on CD by Archive CD Books Ltd, 1992)
- Hutchins, John, History of Dorset, vols 1-4 (3rd ed 1861–70; reprinted by EP Publishing, Wakefield, 1973)
- Mills, A. D., 1977, 1980, 1989: Place Names of Dorset, parts 1–3. English Place Name Society: Survey of English Place Names vols LII, LIII and 59/60
