= Movement for Active Democracy =

British political party

- Abbreviation: M.A.D.
- Leader: Andy Kirkwood
- Founded: 2009
- Headquarters: South Dorset

The Movement for Active Democracy (M.A.D.) was an alternative British political party created by Andy Kirkwood in South Dorset. Party leader Kirkwood endorses the Swiss model of government in which anyone can propose a policy and force the issue to a referendum if they can gather enough support. Without having a general manifesto, that's the main goal of the party. Kirkwood also urges people to stand as independents under the slogan "vote for yourself". The Movement for Active Democracy stood candidates for the first time at the 2010 general election. Kirkwood also stood in South Dorset at the 2015 general election. The party was deregistered in 2023.
