= Robert Stone Comben =

British politician

Robert Stone Comben CBE JP (1868 – 30 December 1957), was a British Liberal Party politician who gave over 40 years service to local government in Dorset.

== Background ==
Comben was born the son of Robert Stone Comben, of the Village Rest Coffee House Woodford Bridge, Essex. In 1893 he married Charlotte Alice Hawkins. They had one daughter Annie Lilian Kate Comben who, when her father was Mayor (1915-1918) was the youngest Mayoress in the history of Weymouth. In 1923 he married Alice Logan (widow) née Jeffries.

He was appointed a CBE in 1920. He was awarded the Freedom of the Borough of Weymouth and Melcombe Regis in 1952, and his name is inscribed on the plaque on Weymouth Town Bridge.

== Political career ==
Comben was elected to Weymouth Borough Council in 1909. He served as Mayor of Weymouth from 1915 to 1918. He was elected to Dorset County Council in 1918. He was Liberal candidate for the South Dorset division at the 1923 General Election. He did not stand for parliament again. He stood down from Dorset County Council in 1950 after 32 years service. In 1952 he resigned from Weymouth Borough Council after 43 years service. He was a Justice of the Peace for Dorset and the Borough of Weymouth and Melcombe Regis.

=== Electoral record ===
General Election 1923: South Dorset
Party	Candidate	Votes	%	±%
Unionist	Robert Yerburgh	11,057	53.5	−3.7
Liberal	Robert Comben	5,973	29.0	+7.0
Labour	David Wyndham Thomas	3,602	17.5	−3.3
Majority		5,084	24.5	−10.7
Turnout			71.6	−3.6
Unionist hold		Swing	-5.4	
