= 2010 Weymouth and Portland Borough Council election =

2010 UK local government election

Results of the 2010 Weymouth and Portland Borough Council election

The 2010 Weymouth and Portland Borough Council election took place on 6 May 2010 to elect members of Weymouth and Portland Borough Council in Dorset, England. One third of the council was up for election and the council stayed under no overall control.

After the election, the composition of the council was

- Conservative 18
- Liberal Democrat 11
- Labour 5
- Independent 2

== Background ==
Before the election the Conservatives had exactly half of the seats with 18, compared to 10 for the Liberal Democrats, 5 Labour and 3 independents. 36 candidates were standing for the 12 seats being contested with the Conservatives defending 7, Labour 2, independents 2 and Liberal Democrats 1.

== Election result ==
The results saw the Conservatives remain as the largest party with 18 of the 36 seats but without a majority. They gained one seat in Tophill West which had been previously held by independent Steven Flew before he stood down at the election. However the Conservatives lost another seat in Melcombe Regis to the Liberal Democrats, with the winning candidate Ray Banham returning to the council on which he had previously served for 10 years. Ian James narrowly held Westham East ward for the Conservatives after having defected from the Liberal Democrats in 2008, while his wife Christine James held Westham North for the Liberal Democrats.

Weymouth and Portland local election result 2010
Party	Seats	Gains	Losses	Net gain/loss	Seats %	Votes %	Votes	+/−
Conservative	7	1	1	0	58.3	40.0	11,211	-0.3%
Labour	2	0	0	0	16.7	30.8	8,637	+9.4%
Liberal Democrats	2	1	0	+1	16.7	21.5	6,043	-10.0%
Independent	1	0	1	-1	8.3	4.9	1,367	-1.0%
Citizens' Action Party	0	0	0	0	0	1.9	524	+1.9%
Green	0	0	0	0	0	1.0	275	+0.1%

== Ward results ==
Littlemoor
Party	Candidate	Votes	%	±%
Labour	Mark Tewkesbury	1,028	65.4	+7.3
Conservative	Nigel Reed	544	34.6	−7.3
Majority		484	30.8	+14.6
Turnout		1,572	58.7	+23.2
Labour hold		Swing		

Melcombe Regis
Party	Candidate	Votes	%	±%
Liberal Democrats	Ray Banham	1,083	41.8	
Conservative	David Price	938	36.2	
Labour	Elaine Walker	568	21.9	
Majority		145	5.6	
Turnout		2,589	52.8	+23.2
Liberal Democrats gain from Conservative		Swing		

Preston
Party	Candidate	Votes	%	±%
Conservative	Hazel Bruce	1,763	50.5	+3.7
Liberal Democrats	Richard Collings	1,345	38.5	−10.0
Labour	Maureen Drake	385	11.0	+6.3
Majority		418	12.0	
Turnout		3,493	80.2	+22.6
Conservative hold		Swing		

Tophill East
Party	Candidate	Votes	%	±%
Independent	Margaret Leicester	657	36.6	−6.3
Conservative	Richard Paisley	652	36.3	+36.3
Labour	Sandy West	488	27.2	+14.1
Majority		5	0.3	−13.3
Turnout		1,797	69.8	+36.3
Independent hold		Swing		

Tophill West
Party	Candidate	Votes	%	±%
Conservative	Ian Munro-Price	768	30.3	−18.4
Labour	Jo Atwell	600	23.7	+3.6
Independent	David Thurston	471	18.6	−12.6
Liberal Democrats	Trefor Morgan	453	17.9	+17.9
Independent	David Beaman	239	9.4	+9.4
Majority		168	6.6	−10.9
Turnout		2,531	62.1	+35.1
Conservative gain from Independent		Swing		

Underhill
Party	Candidate	Votes	%	±%
Labour	Paul Kimber	625	41.2	+24.1
Citizens' Action Party	Richard Denton-White	524	34.5	−0.6
Conservative	Amanda Munro	369	24.3	+15.1
Majority		101	6.7	
Turnout		1,518	56.6	+22.6
Labour hold		Swing		

Upwey and Broadwey
Party	Candidate	Votes	%	±%
Conservative	Robbie Dunster	829	41.4	+5.3
Liberal Democrats	Roger Genge	641	32.0	+5.7
Labour	Stewart Pearson	531	26.5	−3.5
Majority		188	9.4	+3.3
Turnout		2,001	68.9	+26.7
Conservative hold		Swing		

Westham East
Party	Candidate	Votes	%	±%
Conservative	Ian James	611	34.8	+4.7
Liberal Democrats	Oz Kanji	595	33.9	−12.2
Labour	Andy Blackwood	551	31.4	+7.6
Majority		16	0.9	
Turnout		1,757	61.7	+35.9
Conservative hold		Swing		

Westham North
Party	Candidate	Votes	%	±%
Liberal Democrats	Christine James	1,193	42.7	−10.0
Conservative	Andy Manvell	858	30.7	+5.8
Labour	Michael Drake	743	26.6	+4.2
Majority		335	12.0	−15.8
Turnout		2,794	65.9	+31.8
Liberal Democrats hold		Swing		

Wey Valley
Party	Candidate	Votes	%	±%
Conservative	Kevin Hodder	1,139	54.1	−7.9
Labour	Alan Chedzoy	693	32.9	+2.5
Green	Brian Heatley	275	13.1	+5.5
Majority		446	21.2	−10.4
Turnout		2,107	73.9	+28.5
Conservative hold		Swing		

Weymouth West
Party	Candidate	Votes	%	±%
Conservative	Dominic Lonsdale	1,143	40.4	−14.4
Labour	Colin Huckle	956	33.8	−11.4
Liberal Democrats	Mark Fisher	733	25.9	+25.9
Majority		187	6.6	−3.0
Turnout		2,832	69.7	+30.8
Conservative hold		Swing		

Wyke Regis
Party	Candidate	Votes	%	±%
Conservative	Geoff Petherick	1,597	52.1	−11.7
Labour	Lucy Hamilton	1,469	47.9	+11.7
Majority		128	4.2	−23.4
Turnout		3,066	70.4	+32.7
Conservative hold		Swing		
