= 2003 Weymouth and Portland Borough Council election =

2003 UK local government election

Elections to Weymouth and Portland Borough Council were held on 1 May 2003. One third of the council was up for election and the council stayed under no overall control.

After the election, the composition of the council was

- Labour 13
- Liberal Democrat 11
- Conservative 6
- Independent 5

== Election result ==
Weymouth and Portland local election result 2003
Party	Seats	Gains	Losses	Net gain/loss	Seats %	Votes %	Votes	+/−
Labour	4			-2	33.3	31.4	4,419	-7.1%
Liberal Democrats	4			+1	33.3	29.2	4,106	+5.4%
Independent	3			+1	25.0	16.2	2,281	+11.3%
Conservative	1			0	8.3	19.7	2,777	-13.2%
UKIP	0			0	0	3.5	497	+3.5%

== Ward results ==
Melcombe Regis
Party	Candidate	Votes	%	±%
Liberal Democrats	Peter Farrell	454	46.8	−14.7
Conservative	Derek Model	320	33.0	+9.0
Labour	Mary McHugh	197	20.3	+5.8
Majority		134	13.8	−23.7
Turnout		971	25.5	−4.7

North Central
Party	Candidate	Votes	%	±%
Labour	Harry Burden	876	54.5	−6.9
Conservative	Mark Johnson	732	45.5	+6.9
Majority		144	9.0	−13.8
Turnout		1,608	30.5	−0.6

Preston
Party	Candidate	Votes	%	±%
Conservative	Hazel Bruce	1,064	50.3	+9.4
Liberal Democrats	David Mannings	860	40.7	−10.5
Labour	Joy Burrow	190	9.0	+1.0
Majority		204	9.6	
Turnout		2,114	49.8	−1.7

Radipole
Party	Candidate	Votes	%	±%
Liberal Democrats	George Molyneux	599	50.0	
Conservative	George Granycome	439	36.6	
Labour	Stewart Pearson	161	13.4	
Majority		160	13.4	
Turnout		1,199	34.5	

Tophill East
Party	Candidate	Votes	%	±%
Independent	Jacqueline Redfern	358	53.8	−0.8
Independent	Margaret Leicester	307	46.2	+46.2
Majority		51	7.6	−21.3
Turnout		665	27.2	−4.1

Tophill West
Party	Candidate	Votes	%	±%
Independent	Leslie Ames	805	74.9	+74.9
Labour	Ruth Mackay	154	14.3	−38.0
Independent	Simon Avery	116	10.8	+10.8
Majority		651	60.6	
Turnout		1,075	26.6	+5.5

Underhill
Party	Candidate	Votes	%	±%
Independent	Timothy Munro	283	55.5	+55.5
Labour	Lynne Coombe	227	44.5	−24.0
Majority		56	11.0	
Turnout		510	22.7	−3.2

Westham East
Party	Candidate	Votes	%	±%
Liberal Democrats	Jacqueline Hayman	514	59.7	
Labour	Lorraine Rodgers	347	40.3	
Majority		167	19.4	
Turnout		861	29.5	

Westham North
Party	Candidate	Votes	%	±%
Labour	Andrew Hutchings	553	44.7	+17.2
Liberal Democrats	Jennifer Harris	463	37.4	−19.1
Conservative	John Scott	222	17.9	+1.9
Majority		90	7.3	
Turnout		1,238	33.7	−2.8

Westham West
Party	Candidate	Votes	%	±%
Liberal Democrats	Raymond Banham	522	57.0	+10.9
Labour	Angela McCarthy	394	43.0	−10.9
Majority		128	14.0	
Turnout		916	38.2	−2.2

Weymouth West
Party	Candidate	Votes	%	±%
Labour	Kay Wilcox	657	44.1	−17.0
UKIP	Hugh Chalker	497	33.4	+33.4
Liberal Democrats	Shirley Wellman	335	22.5	+22.5
Majority		160	10.7	−11.5
Turnout		1,489	36.4	−0.3

Wyke Regis
Party	Candidate	Votes	%	±%
Labour	James Churchouse	663	46.2	+0.7
Independent	Jack Biggs	412	28.7	+9.8
Liberal Democrats	Charlie Garman	359	25.0	+25.0
Majority		251	17.5	+7.6
Turnout		1,434	34.3	−5.0
