= South Dorset =

Constituency in the UK parliament

Coordinates: 50.5666°N 2.4541°W

- Borough constituency for the House of Commons
- Boundary of South Dorset in South West England
- County: Dorset
- Electorate: 76,640 (2023)
- Major settlements: Weymouth, Swanage

Current constituency
- Created: 1885
- Member of Parliament: Lloyd Hatton (Labour)
- Seats: One
- Created from: Dorset

South Dorset is a constituency (Note: A county constituency (for the purposes of election expenses and type of returning officer).) represented in the House of Commons of the UK Parliament since 2024 by Lloyd Hatton, of the Labour Party. (Note: As with all constituencies, the constituency elects one Member of Parliament (MP) by the first past the post system of election at least every five years.) Major settlements include Weymouth, Swanage and Fortuneswell.

== Constituency profile ==
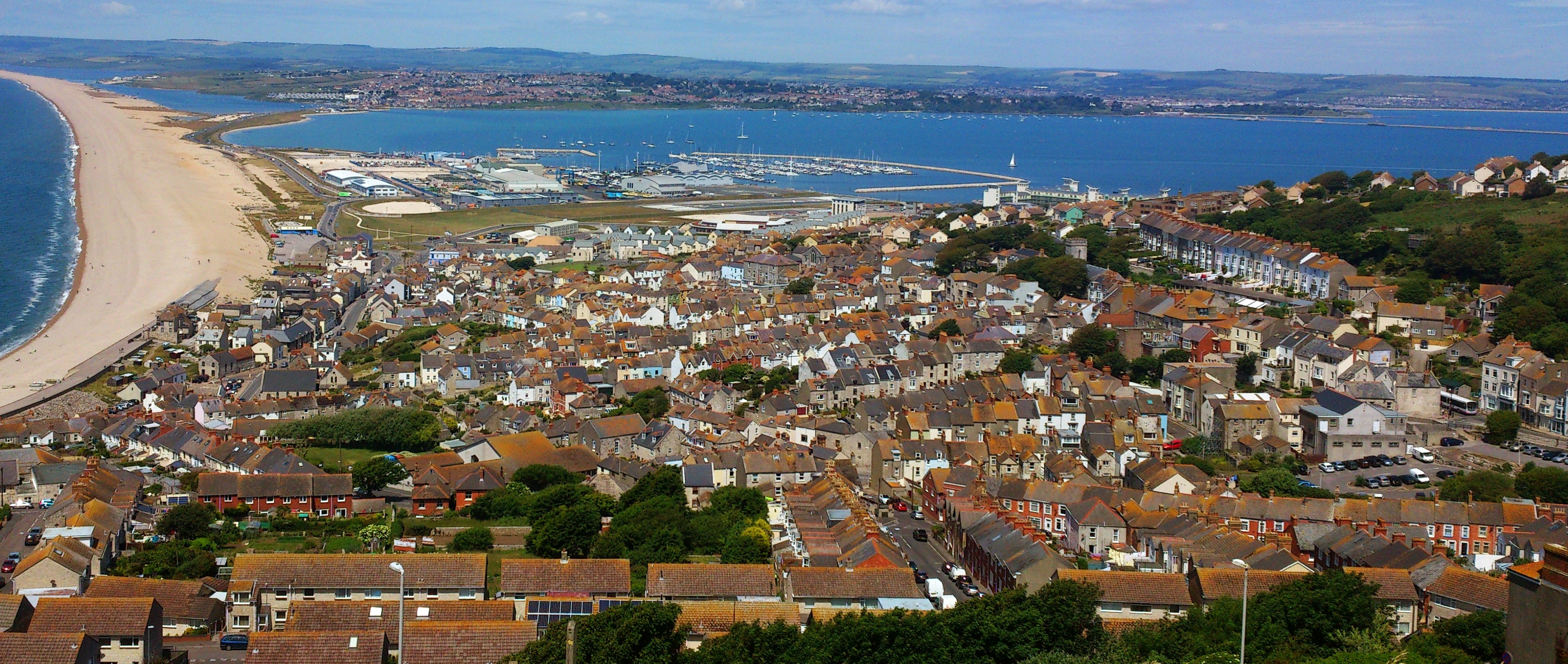
Fortuneswell on the Isle of Portland with Weymouth in the background

South Dorset is a constituency in Dorset in South West England. Its main settlement is the town of Weymouth, which has a population of around 56,000. Other settlements include the towns of Swanage and Chickerell and the villages of Wool, Crossways, Fortuneswell and Easton.

Most residents of this constituency live in Weymouth and the adjacent Isle of Portland. Weymouth is a historic seaside resort town; it was traditionally an important trading port and is today a popular tourist destination. Portland is a tied island south of Weymouth; Portland Harbour is one of the largest man-made harbours in the world and was previously an important Royal Navy base. The constituency stretches east of Weymouth to cover the rural Isle of Purbeck (which is a peninsula rather than an island). This area is also popular with tourists for its steep cliffs, the ruined Corfe Castle and the resort town of Swanage with its preserved steam railway. Purbeck also contains Bovington Camp, a large British Army base. There is some deprivation in Weymouth and Portland, whilst Weymouth's outer suburbs and Purbeck are generally wealthy. House prices here are mostly in line with regional and UK averages.

South Dorset has a large retired population and low proportions of young and middle-aged adults. Residents have below-average rates of income and average levels of homeownership and child poverty. They generally have low levels of education and a high proportion work in the tourism and food sectors. The percentage of residents claiming unemployment benefits is low. White people made up 97% of the population at the 2021 census.

Most of the constituency is represented by Liberal Democrats at the local council, with some Conservatives elected in Swanage and Green Party and Labour Party councillors elected in Weymouth and Portland. Voters in South Dorset strongly supported leaving the European Union in the 2016 referendum; an estimated 60% voted in favour of Brexit compared to the UK-wide figure of 52%.

== History ==
=== Formation ===
The constituency was created as a consequence of the Redistribution of Seats Act 1885. The Act reduced the number of MPs in Dorset from 10 to 4 (see Redistribution of Seats in England, 1885). It was initially proposed to name the new constituencies after existing boroughs (Shaftesbury, Dorchester, Poole and Bridport) but, following an amendment in the Commons on 14 April 1885, the names were changed to the points of the compass (North Dorset, South Dorset, East Dorset, West Dorset).

The South Dorset constituency was divided into 7 polling districts. Dorchester was chosen as the place where the nomination of candidates would take place and the result would be declared. The area covered was:

- Broadwey polling district: Bincombe, Broadwey, Buckland Ripers, Preston and Sutton Poyntz, Upwey
- Chesilton polling district: Portland
- Dorchester polling district: Bockhampton-cum-Stinsford, Bradford Peverell and Muckleford, Charminster, Dorchester All Saints, Dorchester Holy Trinity, Dorchester St Peter, Fordington, Stratton and Grimstone, West Knighton, West Stafford, Whitcombe, Winterborne Came, Winterborne Herringstone, Winterborne Monkton, Winterborne St Martin
- Melcombe Regis polling district: Chickerell, Fleet, Melcombe Regis, Radipole, Weymouth, Wyke Regis
- Poxwell polling district: Broadmayne, Osmington, Poxwell, Warmwell, Watercombe
- Puddletown polling district: Affpuddle, Athelhampton, Burleston, Dewlish, Piddlehinton, Puddletown, Tincleton, Tolpuddle, Turners Puddle, Woodsford
- Winfrith polling district: Chaldon Herring, Coombe Keynes, East Lulworth, Moreton, Owermoigne, West Lulworth, Winfrith Newburgh, Wool

=== Recent history ===
In the 1997 election the seat was won by Ian Bruce by a margin of only 77 votes, one of the smallest margins in the UK. The 2001 election saw the second Labour win in South Dorset's history with Labour's smallest majority in England, at 153. In the 2005 election this constituency was one of the few in which Labour significantly increased their majority. Conservative candidate Ed Matts was found to have doctored an image which was part of his campaign material. Matts changed a photo of a protest against the deportation of a South Dorset resident, so that it appeared to be a protest against "uncontrolled immigration". In both elections, the left-wing singer-songwriter Billy Bragg led an anti-Conservative tactical voting campaign in Dorset constituencies.

The 2010 election saw Conservative Richard Drax, a former soldier and journalist from a long line of Dorset representatives, defeating the incumbent Jim Knight, who ended his final year in parliament as the Minister (of State) for Employment and Welfare Reform. Richard Drax retained the seat in 2015 election with an increased majority.

The 2024 election saw Labour candidate Lloyd Hatton defeat Richard Drax.

== Boundaries ==
Map of boundaries 2010–2024

1885–1918: The Municipal Boroughs of Dorchester, and Weymouth and Melcombe Regis, and parts of the Sessional Divisions of Dorchester and Wareham.

1918–1950: The Municipal Boroughs of Wareham, and Weymouth and Melcombe Regis, the Urban Districts of Portland and Swanage, the Rural District of Wareham and Purbeck, and the part of the Rural District of Weymouth that was not included in the Dorset West constituency (i.e. Bincombe, Broadwey, Chickerell, Fleet, Osmington, Owermoigne, Poxwell, Preston, Radipole, Upwey and Wyke Regis).

1950–1983: The Municipal Boroughs of Wareham, and Weymouth and Melcombe Regis, the Urban Districts of Portland and Swanage, the Rural District of Wareham and Purbeck, and in the Rural District of Dorchester the civil parishes of Bincombe, Chickerell, Fleet, Osmington, Owermoigne, and Poxwell.

1983–1997: The Borough of Weymouth and Portland, the District of Purbeck wards of Bere Regis, Castle, Langton, St Martin, Swanage North, Swanage South, Wareham, West Purbeck, Winfrith, and Wool, and the District of West Dorset ward of Owermoigne.

1997–2010: The Borough of Weymouth and Portland, the District of Purbeck wards of Castle, Langton, Swanage North, Swanage South, West Purbeck, Winfrith, and Wool, and the District of West Dorset ward of Owermoigne.

2010–2024: The Borough of Weymouth and Portland, the District of Purbeck wards of Castle, Creech Barrow, Langton, Swanage North, Swanage South, West Purbeck, Winfrith, and Wool, and the District of West Dorset ward of Owermoigne.

2024–present: The District of Dorset wards of Chickerell, Crossways, Littlemoor & Preston, Melcombe Regis, Portland, Radipole, Rodwell & Wyke, South East Purbeck, Swanage, Upwey & Broadwey, polling districts WPU1 and WPU4 through to WPU13 in West Purbeck, and Westham

Minor changes following re-organisation of local authorities and wards in Dorset.

== Members of Parliament ==
| Election | Member | Party |
|---|---|---|
| 1885 | Henry Parkman Sturgis | Liberal |
| 1886 | Charles J. T. Hambro | Conservative |
| 1891 by-election | William Brymer | Conservative |
| 1906 | Thomas Scarisbrick | Liberal |
| 1910 | Angus Hambro | Conservative |
| 1918 | Angus Hambro | Coalition Conservative |
| 1922 | Robert Yerburgh | Conservative |
| 1929 | Robert Gascoyne-Cecil | Conservative |
| 1941 by-election | Victor Montagu | Conservative |
| 1962 by-election | Guy Barnett | Labour |
| 1964 | Evelyn King | Conservative |
| 1979 | Robert Gascoyne-Cecil | Conservative |
| 1987 | Ian Bruce | Conservative |
| 2001 | Jim Knight | Labour |
| 2010 | Richard Drax | Conservative |
| 2024 | Lloyd Hatton | Labour |

== Elections ==
=== Elections in the 2020s ===
General election 2024: South Dorset
| Party | Candidate | Votes | % | ±% |
|---|---|---|---|---|
| Labour | Lloyd Hatton | 15,659 | 31.9 | +7.1 |
| Conservative | Richard Drax | 14,611 | 29.8 | −29.4 |
| Reform | Morgan Young | 8,168 | 16.7 | N/A |
| Liberal Democrats | Matt Bell | 8,017 | 16.3 | +5.6 |
| Green | Catherine Bennett | 2,153 | 4.4 | ±0.0 |
| Independent | Joy Wilson | 192 | 0.4 | N/A |
| Independent | Giovanna Lewis | 185 | 0.4 | N/A |
| Independent | Rosie Morrell | 52 | 0.1 | N/A |
| Majority | | 1,048 | 2.1 | N/A |
| Turnout | | 49,037 | 64.6 | –4.2 |
| Registered electors | | 75,924 | | |
| Labour gain from Conservative | | Swing | ▲18.3 | |

=== Elections in the 2010s ===
2019 notional result
| Party | Vote | % |
|---|---|---|
| Conservative | 31,209 | 59.2 |
| Labour | 13,062 | 24.8 |
| Liberal Democrats | 5,628 | 10.7 |
| Green | 2,335 | 4.4 |
| Others | 485 | 0.9 |
| Turnout | 52,719 | 68.8 |
| Electorate | 76,640 | |

General election 2019: South Dorset
| Party | Candidate | Votes | % | ±% |
|---|---|---|---|---|
| Conservative | Richard Drax | 30,024 | 58.8 | +2.7 |
| Labour | Carralyn Parkes | 12,871 | 25.2 | −8.4 |
| Liberal Democrats | Nick Ireland | 5,432 | 10.6 | +4.7 |
| Green | Jon Orrell | 2,246 | 4.4 | 0.0 |
| Independent | Joseph Green | 485 | 0.9 | New |
| Majority | | 17,153 | 33.6 | +11.1 |
| Turnout | | 51,058 | 69.4 | +0.7 |
| Conservative hold | | Swing | +5.5 | |

General election 2017: South Dorset
| Party | Candidate | Votes | % | ±% |
|---|---|---|---|---|
| Conservative | Richard Drax | 29,135 | 56.1 | +7.4 |
| Labour | Tashi Warr | 17,440 | 33.6 | +9.4 |
| Liberal Democrats | Howard Legg | 3,053 | 5.9 | −0.1 |
| Green | Jon Orrell | 2,278 | 4.4 | −0.3 |
| Majority | | 11,695 | 22.5 | −2.0 |
| Turnout | | 51,906 | 68.7 | +0.6 |
| Conservative hold | | Swing | –1.0 | |

General election 2015: South Dorset
| Party | Candidate | Votes | % | ±% |
|---|---|---|---|---|
| Conservative | Richard Drax | 23,756 | 48.7 | +3.6 |
| Labour | Simon Bowkett | 11,762 | 24.2 | −6.1 |
| UKIP | Malcolm Shakesby | 7,304 | 15.0 | +11.0 |
| Liberal Democrats | Howard Legg | 2,901 | 6.0 | −13.0 |
| Green | Jane Burnet | 2,275 | 4.7 | +3.5 |
| Independent | Mervyn Stewkesbury | 435 | 0.9 | New |
| Movement for Active Democracy | Andy Kirkwood | 164 | 0.3 | −0.2 |
| Majority | | 11,994 | 24.5 | +9.7 |
| Turnout | | 48,737 | 68.1 | −0.5 |
| Conservative hold | | Swing | +4.9 | |

General election 2010: South Dorset
| Party | Candidate | Votes | % | ±% |
|---|---|---|---|---|
| Conservative | Richard Drax | 22,667 | 45.1 | +7.1 |
| Labour | Jim Knight | 15,224 | 30.3 | −11.4 |
| Liberal Democrats | Ros Kayes | 9,557 | 19.0 | +3.2 |
| UKIP | Mike Hobson | 2,034 | 4.0 | +0.8 |
| Green | Brian Heatley | 595 | 1.2 | New |
| Movement for Active Democracy | Andy Kirkwood | 233 | 0.5 | New |
| Majority | | 7,443 | 14.8 | N/A |
| Turnout | | 50,310 | 68.6 | −0.8 |
| Conservative gain from Labour | | Swing | +9.3 | |

=== Elections in the 2000s ===
General election 2005: South Dorset
| Party | Candidate | Votes | % | ±% |
|---|---|---|---|---|
| Labour | Jim Knight | 20,231 | 41.6 | −0.4 |
| Conservative | Ed Matts | 18,419 | 37.9 | −3.7 |
| Liberal Democrats | Graham Oakes | 7,647 | 15.7 | +1.3 |
| UKIP | Hugh Chalker | 1,571 | 3.2 | +1.2 |
| Legalise Cannabis | Vic Hamilton | 282 | 0.6 | New |
| Respect | Berny Parkes | 219 | 0.5 | New |
| Personality and Rational Thinking? Yes! Party | Andy Kirkwood | 107 | 0.2 | New |
| Wessex Regionalists | Colin Bex | 83 | 0.2 | New |
| Socialist Labour | David Marchesi | 25 | 0.1 | New |
| Majority | | 1,812 | 3.7 | +3.3 |
| Turnout | | 48,584 | 69.4 | +3.9 |
| Labour hold | | Swing | +1.7 | |

General election 2001: South Dorset
| Party | Candidate | Votes | % | ±% |
|---|---|---|---|---|
| Labour | Jim Knight | 19,027 | 42.0 | +6.1 |
| Conservative | Ian Bruce | 18,874 | 41.6 | +5.5 |
| Liberal Democrats | Andy Canning | 6,531 | 14.4 | −5.8 |
| UKIP | Laurie Moss | 913 | 2.0 | +0.3 |
| Majority | | 153 | 0.4 | N/A |
| Turnout | | 45,345 | 65.5 | −8.5 |
| Labour gain from Conservative | | Swing | +0.3 | |

=== Elections in the 1990s ===
General election 1997: South Dorset
| Party | Candidate | Votes | % | ±% |
|---|---|---|---|---|
| Conservative | Ian Bruce | 17,755 | 36.1 | −14.2 |
| Labour | Jim Knight | 17,678 | 35.9 | +14.8 |
| Liberal Democrats | Mike Plummer | 9,936 | 20.2 | −6.9 |
| Referendum | Patrick C. McAndrew | 2,791 | 5.7 | New |
| UKIP | Malcolm Shakesby | 861 | 1.8 | New |
| Natural Law | Gerald T.H. Napper | 161 | 0.3 | Steady |
| Majority | | 77 | 0.2 | −23.0 |
| Turnout | | 49,182 | 74.0 | −2.9 |
| Conservative hold | | Swing | −14.5 | |

General election 1992: South Dorset
| Party | Candidate | Votes | % | ±% |
|---|---|---|---|---|
| Conservative | Ian Bruce | 29,319 | 50.3 | −4.5 |
| Liberal Democrats | Brian E.J. Ellis | 15,811 | 27.1 | −0.4 |
| Labour | Alan Chedzoy | 12,298 | 21.1 | +3.9 |
| Independent | JW Hagel | 673 | 1.2 | New |
| Natural Law | MRF Griffiths | 191 | 0.3 | New |
| Majority | | 13,508 | 23.2 | −4.2 |
| Turnout | | 58,292 | 76.9 | +1.3 |
| Conservative hold | | Swing | −2.1 | |

=== Elections in the 1980s ===
General election 1987: South Dorset
| Party | Candidate | Votes | % | ±% |
|---|---|---|---|---|
| Conservative | Ian Bruce | 30,184 | 54.8 | −2.3 |
| Liberal | Brian Ellis | 15,117 | 27.5 | +0.5 |
| Labour | Brenda Dench | 9,494 | 17.3 | +1.7 |
| Independent | Alistair Hayler | 244 | 0.4 | New |
| Majority | | 15,067 | 27.3 | −2.8 |
| Turnout | | 55,039 | 75.6 | +2.9 |
| Conservative hold | | Swing | -1.4 | |

General election 1983: South Dorset
| Party | Candidate | Votes | % | ±% |
|---|---|---|---|---|
| Conservative | Robert Gascoyne-Cecil | 28,631 | 57.1 | +1.4 |
| SDP | Simon Head | 13,533 | 27.0 | +12.1 |
| Labour | David Hewitt | 7,831 | 15.6 | −12.9 |
| Independent | B.O. Smith | 151 | 0.3 | New |
| Majority | | 15,098 | 30.1 | +3.9 |
| Turnout | | 50,146 | 72.7 | −5.6 |
| Conservative hold | | Swing | | |

=== Elections in the 1970s ===
General election 1979: South Dorset
| Party | Candidate | Votes | % | ±% |
|---|---|---|---|---|
| Conservative | Robert Gascoyne-Cecil | 32,372 | 55.67 | |
| Labour | Alan Chedzoy | 17,133 | 29.46 | |
| Liberal | P St. J Howe | 8,649 | 14.87 | |
| Majority | | 15,239 | 26.21 | |
| Turnout | | 58,154 | 78.33 | |
| Conservative hold | | Swing | | |

General election October 1974: South Dorset
| Party | Candidate | Votes | % | ±% |
|---|---|---|---|---|
| Conservative | Evelyn King | 24,351 | 45.88 | |
| Labour | Alan Chedzoy | 17,652 | 33.26 | |
| Liberal | C Sandy | 11,075 | 20.87 | |
| Majority | | 6,699 | 12.62 | |
| Turnout | | 53,078 | 75.38 | |
| Conservative hold | | Swing | | |

General election February 1974: South Dorset
| Party | Candidate | Votes | % | ±% |
|---|---|---|---|---|
| Conservative | Evelyn King | 26,933 | 46.93 | |
| Labour | Alan Chedzoy | 18,318 | 31.92 | |
| Liberal | DT Broomfield | 12,140 | 21.15 | |
| Majority | | 8,615 | 15.01 | |
| Turnout | | 57,391 | 82.19 | |
| Conservative hold | | Swing | | |

General election 1970: South Dorset
| Party | Candidate | Votes | % | ±% |
|---|---|---|---|---|
| Conservative | Evelyn King | 27,580 | 52.06 | |
| Labour | Richard May | 20,716 | 39.10 | |
| Liberal | Keith Searby | 4,680 | 8.83 | |
| Majority | | 6,864 | 12.96 | |
| Turnout | | 52,976 | 78.98 | |
| Conservative hold | | Swing | | |

=== Elections in the 1960s ===
General election 1966: South Dorset
| Party | Candidate | Votes | % | ±% |
|---|---|---|---|---|
| Conservative | Evelyn King | 22,997 | 46.01 | |
| Labour | Frederick W Morgan | 21,120 | 42.26 | |
| Liberal | Geoffrey Maxwell Goode | 5,862 | 11.72 | |
| Majority | | 1,877 | 3.75 | |
| Turnout | | 49,979 | 81.00 | |
| Conservative hold | | Swing | | |

General election 1964: South Dorset
| Party | Candidate | Votes | % | ±% |
|---|---|---|---|---|
| Conservative | Evelyn King | 21,209 | 43.66 | |
| Labour | Guy Barnett | 20,274 | 41.73 | |
| Liberal | Terence Bourke | 7,100 | 14.61 | |
| Majority | | 935 | 1.93 | |
| Turnout | | 48,583 | 81.02 | |
| Conservative hold | | Swing | | |

1962 South Dorset by-election
| Party | Candidate | Votes | % | ±% |
|---|---|---|---|---|
| Labour | Guy Barnett | 13,783 | 33.51 | −1.16 |
| Conservative | Angus Maude | 13,079 | 31.79 | −17.99 |
| Liberal | Lawrence I Norbury-Williams | 8,910 | 21.66 | +6.11 |
| Anti Common Market | Piers Debenham | 5,057 | 12.29 | New |
| Independent | P. Burn | 181 | 0.44 | New |
| Independent | M. Fudge | 82 | 0.20 | New |
| Independent | J.C. O'Connor | 45 | 0.11 | New |
| Majority | | 704 | 1.72 | N/A |
| Turnout | | 41,137 | | |
| Labour gain from Conservative | | Swing | | |

=== Elections in the 1950s ===
General election 1959: South Dorset
| Party | Candidate | Votes | % | ±% |
|---|---|---|---|---|
| Conservative | Victor Montagu | 22,050 | 49.78 | |
| Labour | Conrad F Ascher | 15,357 | 34.67 | |
| Liberal | Lawrence I Norbury-Williams | 6,887 | 15.55 | |
| Majority | | 6,693 | 15.11 | |
| Turnout | | 44,294 | 78.82 | |
| Conservative hold | | Swing | | |

General election 1955: South Dorset
| Party | Candidate | Votes | % | ±% |
|---|---|---|---|---|
| Conservative | Victor Montagu | 22,119 | 50.71 | |
| Labour | Frederick Newman Stacey | 16,702 | 38.29 | |
| Liberal | Geoffrey Maxwell Goode | 4,798 | 11.00 | |
| Majority | | 5,417 | 12.42 | |
| Turnout | | 43,619 | 79.25 | |
| Conservative hold | | Swing | | |

General election 1951: South Dorset
| Party | Candidate | Votes | % | ±% |
|---|---|---|---|---|
| Conservative | Victor Montagu | 21,679 | 48.25 | |
| Labour | Frederick Newman Stacey | 18,244 | 40.61 | |
| Liberal | Wilfred Ewart Ward | 5,005 | 11.14 | |
| Majority | | 3,435 | 7.64 | |
| Turnout | | 44,928 | 83.98 | |
| Conservative hold | | Swing | | |

General election 1950: South Dorset
| Party | Candidate | Votes | % | ±% |
|---|---|---|---|---|
| Conservative | Victor Montagu | 20,014 | 45.51 | |
| Labour | Frederick Newman Stacey | 17,471 | 39.73 | |
| Liberal | Wyatt Trevelyan Rawson Rawson | 6,489 | 14.76 | |
| Majority | | 2,543 | 5.78 | |
| Turnout | | 43,974 | 84.38 | |
| Conservative hold | | Swing | | |

=== Elections in the 1940s ===
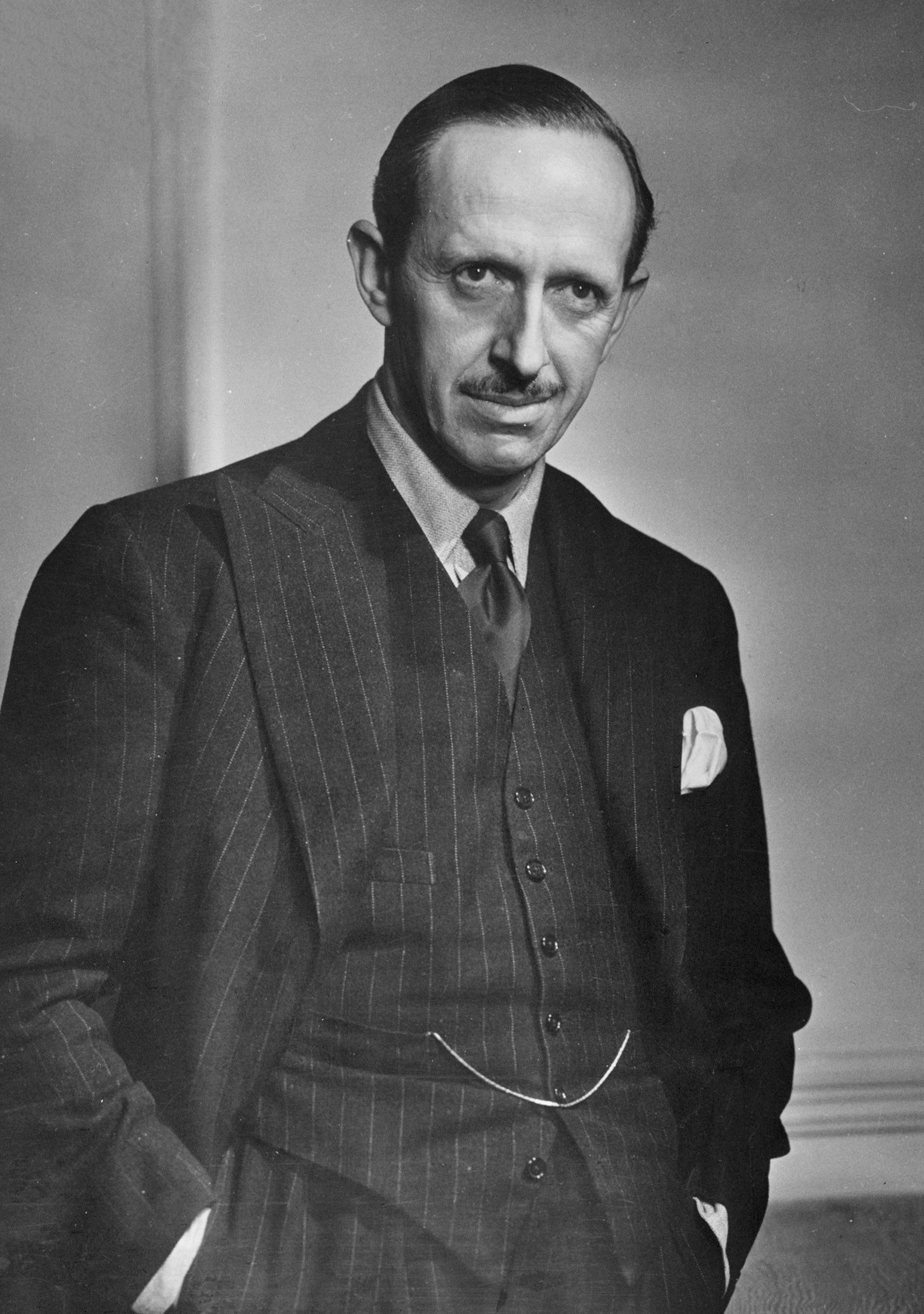
Hinchingbrooke

General election 1945: Dorset Southern
| Party | Candidate | Votes | % | ±% |
|---|---|---|---|---|
| Conservative | Victor Montagu | 14,626 | 42.72 | |
| Labour | Philip Sidney Eastman | 12,460 | 36.40 | |
| Liberal | Wilfred Ewart Ward | 7,149 | 20.88 | |
| Majority | | 2,166 | 6.32 | |
| Turnout | | 34,235 | 73.60 | |
| Conservative hold | | Swing | | |

1941 South Dorset by-election
| Party | Candidate | Votes | % | ±% |
|---|---|---|---|---|
| Conservative | Victor Montagu | Unopposed | N/A | N/A |
| Conservative hold | | | | |

General Election 1939–40:

Another general election was required to take place before the end of 1940. The political parties had been making preparations for an election to take place from 1939 and by the end of this year, the following candidates had been selected;

- Conservative: Robert Gascoyne-Cecil
- Liberal: Frederick William King
- Labour: Philip Sidney Eastman

=== Elections in the 1930s ===
General election 1935: Dorset Southern
| Party | Candidate | Votes | % | ±% |
|---|---|---|---|---|
| Conservative | Robert Gascoyne-Cecil | 17,637 | 57.88 | |
| Labour | Arthur William Wiltshire | 8,580 | 28.16 | |
| Liberal | Frederick William King | 4,255 | 13.96 | New |
| Majority | | 9,057 | 29.72 | |
| Turnout | | 30,472 | 70.05 | |
| Conservative hold | | Swing | | |

General election 1931: Dorset Southern
| Party | Candidate | Votes | % | ±% |
|---|---|---|---|---|
| Conservative | Robert Gascoyne-Cecil | 21,284 | 70.73 | |
| Labour | Arthur William Wiltshire | 8,809 | 29.27 | |
| Majority | | 12,475 | 41.46 | |
| Turnout | | 30,093 | 73.29 | |
| Conservative hold | | Swing | | |

=== Elections in the 1920s ===
General election 1929: Dorset South
| Party | Candidate | Votes | % | ±% |
|---|---|---|---|---|
| Unionist | Robert Gascoyne-Cecil | 14,632 | 49.2 | −21.3 |
| Liberal | Cuthbert Plaistowe | 8,168 | 27.4 | New |
| Labour | Arthur William Wiltshire | 6,959 | 23.4 | −6.1 |
| Majority | | 6,464 | 21.8 | −19.2 |
| Turnout | | 29,759 | 75.5 | +9.4 |
| Registered electors | | 39,396 | | |
| Unionist hold | | Swing | −7.6 | |

General election 1924: South Dorset
| Party | Candidate | Votes | % | ±% |
|---|---|---|---|---|
| Unionist | Robert Yerburgh | 13,900 | 70.5 | +17.0 |
| Labour | W Ridson | 5,821 | 29.5 | +12.0 |
| Majority | | 8,079 | 41.0 | +15.5 |
| Turnout | | 19,721 | 66.1 | −5.5 |
| Registered electors | | 29,845 | | |
| Unionist hold | | Swing | +2.5 | |

General election 1923: South Dorset
| Party | Candidate | Votes | % | ±% |
|---|---|---|---|---|
| Unionist | Robert Yerburgh | 11,057 | 53.5 | −3.7 |
| Liberal | Robert Comben | 5,973 | 29.0 | +7.0 |
| Labour | David Wyndham Thomas | 3,602 | 17.5 | −3.3 |
| Majority | | 5,084 | 24.5 | −10.7 |
| Turnout | | 20,632 | 71.6 | −3.6 |
| Registered electors | | 28,810 | | |
| Unionist hold | | Swing | −5.4 | |

General election 1922: South Dorset
| Party | Candidate | Votes | % | ±% |
|---|---|---|---|---|
| Unionist | Robert Yerburgh | 12,121 | 57.2 | −11.2 |
| Liberal | Fred Maddison | 4,657 | 22.0 | New |
| Labour | Henry Pavely | 4,394 | 20.8 | −10.8 |
| Majority | | 7,464 | 35.2 | −1.6 |
| Turnout | | 21,172 | 75.2 | +17.3 |
| Registered electors | | 28,149 | | |
| Unionist hold | | Swing | −0.2 | |

=== Elections in the 1910s ===
General election 1918: South Dorset
| Party | | Candidate | Votes | % | ±% |
|---|---|---|---|---|---|
| C | Unionist | Angus Hambro | 11,175 | 68.4 | N/A |
| | Labour | Brett Morgan | 5,159 | 31.6 | New |
| Majority | | | 6,016 | 36.8 | N/A |
| Turnout | | | 16,334 | 57.9 | N/A |
| Registered electors | | | 28,224 | | |
| | Unionist hold | | Swing | N/A | |
C indicates candidate endorsed by the coalition government.

General election December 1910: South Dorset
| Party | Candidate | Votes | % | ±% |
|---|---|---|---|---|
| Unionist | Angus Hambro | Unopposed | | |
| Unionist hold | | | | |

General election January 1910: South Dorset
| Party | Candidate | Votes | % | ±% |
|---|---|---|---|---|
| Conservative | Angus Hambro | 5,811 | 57.0 | +10.3 |
| Liberal | Thomas Scarisbrick | 4,379 | 43.0 | −10.3 |
| Majority | | 1,432 | 14.0 | N/A |
| Turnout | | 10,190 | 89.1 | +2.0 |
| Registered electors | | 11,440 | | |
| Conservative gain from Liberal | | Swing | +10.3 | |

=== Elections in the 1900s ===
Tom Scarisbrick

General election 1906: South Dorset
| Party | Candidate | Votes | % | ±% |
|---|---|---|---|---|
| Liberal | Thomas Scarisbrick | 5,035 | 53.3 | +5.8 |
| Conservative | William Brymer | 4,411 | 46.7 | −5.8 |
| Majority | | 624 | 6.6 | N/A |
| Turnout | | 9,446 | 87.1 | +4.9 |
| Registered electors | | 10,845 | | |
| Liberal gain from Conservative | | Swing | +5.8 | |

Leslie Renton

General election 1900: South Dorset
| Party | Candidate | Votes | % | ±% |
|---|---|---|---|---|
| Conservative | William Brymer | 3,884 | 52.5 | N/A |
| Liberal | Leslie Renton | 3,519 | 47.5 | New |
| Majority | | 365 | 5.0 | N/A |
| Turnout | | 7,403 | 82.2 | N/A |
| Registered electors | | 9,011 | | |
| Conservative hold | | Swing | N/A | |

=== Elections in the 1890s ===
General election 1895: South Dorset
| Party | Candidate | Votes | % | ±% |
|---|---|---|---|---|
| Conservative | William Brymer | Unopposed | | |
| Conservative hold | | | | |

William Brymer

General election 1892: South Dorset
| Party | Candidate | Votes | % | ±% |
|---|---|---|---|---|
| Conservative | William Brymer | 3,657 | 51.2 | −7.1 |
| Liberal | Robert Edgcumbe | 3,489 | 48.8 | +7.1 |
| Majority | | 168 | 2.4 | −14.2 |
| Turnout | | 7,146 | 86.0 | +4.5 |
| Registered electors | | 8,310 | | |
| Conservative hold | | Swing | −7.1 | |

1891 South Dorset by-election
| Party | Candidate | Votes | % | ±% |
|---|---|---|---|---|
| Conservative | William Brymer | 3,278 | 50.3 | −8.0 |
| Liberal | Robert Edgcumbe | 3,238 | 49.7 | +8.0 |
| Majority | | 40 | 0.6 | −16.0 |
| Turnout | | 6,516 | 84.0 | +2.5 |
| Registered electors | | 7,757 | | |
| Conservative hold | | Swing | −8.0 | |

=== Elections in the 1880s ===
General election 1886: South Dorset
| Party | Candidate | Votes | % | ±% |
|---|---|---|---|---|
| Conservative | Charles J. T. Hambro | 3,477 | 58.3 | +8.6 |
| Liberal | Henry Parkman Sturgis | 2,486 | 41.7 | −8.6 |
| Majority | | 991 | 16.6 | N/A |
| Turnout | | 5,963 | 81.5 | −3.6 |
| Registered electors | | 7,316 | | |
| Conservative gain from Liberal | | Swing | +8.6 | |

General election 1885: South Dorset
| Party | Candidate | Votes | % | ±% |
|---|---|---|---|---|
| Liberal | Henry Parkman Sturgis | 3,128 | 50.3 | |
| Conservative | Charles J. T. Hambro | 3,095 | 49.7 | |
| Majority | | 33 | 0.6 | |
| Turnout | | 6,223 | 85.1 | |
| Registered electors | | 7,316 | | |
| Liberal win (new seat) | | | | |

== See also ==
- List of parliamentary constituencies in Dorset

== Sources ==
- BBC News article on the 2001 South Dorset election
