= John Comben =

Australian rules footballer

Personal information
- Full name: John Comben
- Born: 13 June 1944 (age 82)
- Original team: Werribee South
- Height: 175 cm (5 ft 9 in)
- Weight: 70 kg (154 lb)
- Position: Wing

Playing career^{1}
Years	Club	Games (Goals)
1963–66	Carlton	38 (11)
1967	Melbourne	1 (0)
Total		39 (11)
- ^{1} Playing statistics correct to the end of 1967.

John Comben (born 13 June 1944) is a former Australian rules footballer who played with Carlton and Melbourne in the Victorian Football League (VFL).
