= 2008 Weymouth and Portland Borough Council election =

2008 UK local government election

Results of the 2008 Weymouth and Portland Borough Council election

Elections to Weymouth and Portland Borough Council in Dorset, England were held on 1 May 2008. One third of the council was up for election and the council stayed under no overall control as it has been since 1980.

The Mayor David Harris and four other councillors stood down at the election. A further seat was vacant for Melcombe Regis after the death of a Liberal Democrat councillor.

The election saw the Conservative Party gain 3 seats, including their first ever seat in Portland, consolidating their position as largest party on the council. However their leader Nigel Reed lost in Weymouth East to the Liberal Democrats. The leader of the Labour Party on the council, Kate Wheller, was one of two Labour losses when she lost in Westham West.

After the election, the composition of the council was:

- Conservative 16
- Liberal Democrat 12
- Labour 4
- Independent 4

== Election result ==
Weymouth and Portland local election result 2008
Party	Seats	Gains	Losses	Net gain/loss	Seats %	Votes %	Votes	+/−
Liberal Democrats	7	2	1	+1	53.8	31.5	5,332	+3.4
Conservative	4	3	1	+2	30.8	40.3	6,824	+1.6
Labour	1	0	2	-2	7.7	21.4	3,635	-3.5
Independent	1	0	1	-1	7.7	5.9	1,008	+1.2
Green	0	0	0	0	0	0.9	154	-1.2

== Ward results ==
Littlemoor
Party	Candidate	Votes	%	±%
Labour	Simon Bowkett	383	58.1	+2.8
Conservative	Ronald Peattie	276	41.9	+12.1
Majority		107	16.2	−9.3
Turnout		659	25.5	−10.5
Labour hold		Swing		

Melcombe Regis (2)
Party	Candidate	Votes	%	±%
Liberal Democrats	Peter Farrell	625		
Conservative	Grant Leighton	605		
Conservative	Derek Model	503		
Liberal Democrats	John Liles	494		
Labour	Maria Blackwood	184		
Green	Paul McIntosh	154		
Labour	Justine Marriott	137		
Turnout		2,702	29.6	+1.2
Liberal Democrats hold		Swing		
Conservative gain from Liberal Democrats		Swing		

Preston
Party	Candidate	Votes	%	±%
Liberal Democrats	David Mannings	1,201	48.5	+5.2
Conservative	Dominic Lonsdale	1,157	46.8	−4.4
Labour	Maureen Drake	116	4.7	−0.9
Majority		44	1.7	
Turnout		2,474	57.6	+3.2
Liberal Democrats hold		Swing		

Radipole
Party	Candidate	Votes	%	±%
Liberal Democrats	Ian Roebuck	704	54.2	−13.2
Conservative	Ralph Johnson	407	31.4	+14.2
Labour	Matt Pitman	187	14.4	+7.4
Majority		294	22.8	−27.4
Turnout		1,298	42.8	+0.2
Liberal Democrats hold		Swing		

Tophill West
Party	Candidate	Votes	%	±%
Conservative	Amanda Alsop	518	48.7	−18.5
Independent	Gareth Duncan	332	31.2	+31.2
Labour	Jo Atwell	214	20.1	−12.7
Majority		186	17.5	−16.9
Turnout		1,064	27.0	−0.6
Conservative gain from Independent		Swing		

Underhill
Party	Candidate	Votes	%	±%
Independent	Tim Munro	354	38.6	
Independent	Richard Denton-White	322	35.1	
Labour	Sandy West	157	17.1	
Conservative	Margaret Gadd	84	9.2	
Majority		32	3.5	
Turnout		917	34.0	
Independent hold		Swing		

Westham East
Party	Candidate	Votes	%	±%
Liberal Democrats	Howard Legg	334	46.1	−10.5
Conservative	Liisa Wallace	218	30.1	+9.6
Labour	Stewart Pearson	172	23.8	+0.9
Majority		116	16.0	−17.7
Turnout		724	25.8	−7.3
Liberal Democrats hold		Swing		

Westham North
Party	Candidate	Votes	%	±%
Liberal Democrats	Graham Winter	750	52.7	+10.6
Conservative	David Wallace	354	24.9	+2.6
Labour	Lindsay Drage	319	22.4	−13.2
Majority		396	27.8	+21.3
Turnout		1,423	34.1	−2.7
Liberal Democrats hold		Swing		

Westham West
Party	Candidate	Votes	%	±%
Liberal Democrats	Gill Taylor	530	44.1	+10.7
Labour	Kate Wheller	351	29.2	−2.0
Conservative	Margaret Alsop	321	26.7	−8.6
Majority		179	14.9	
Turnout		1,202	41.4	−1.7
Liberal Democrats gain from Labour		Swing		

Weymouth East
Party	Candidate	Votes	%	±%
Liberal Democrats	John Birtwistle	694	53.2	+17.1
Conservative	Nigel Reed	489	37.5	−2.4
Labour	Richard Baker	121	9.3	−8.9
Majority		205	15.7	
Turnout		1,304	45.7	+3.3
Liberal Democrats gain from Conservative		Swing		

Weymouth West
Party	Candidate	Votes	%	±%
Conservative	Sonia Cash	856	54.8	+14.2
Labour	Andy Blackwood	705	45.2	+8.6
Majority		151	9.6	+5.6
Turnout		1,561	38.9	−2.2
Conservative gain from Labour		Swing		

Wyke Regis
Party	Candidate	Votes	%	±%
Conservative	Doug Hollings	1,036	63.8	+25.7
Labour	Colin Huckle	589	36.2	−6.2
Majority		447	27.6	
Turnout		1,625	37.7	−0.6
Conservative hold		Swing		
