= 1941 South Dorset by-election =

UK Parliamentary by-election

The 1941 South Dorset by-election was held on 22 February 1941. The by-election was held due to the succession to the peerage by writ of acceleration of the incumbent Conservative MP, Robert Gascoyne-Cecil, as Baron Cecil of Essendon the junior subsidiary title of The Marquess of Salisbury then held by his father. It was won by the Conservative candidate Victor Montagu.
