= 2012 Weymouth and Portland Borough Council election =

2012 UK local government election

Map of the results of the 2012 Weymouth and Portland council election. Labour in red, Liberal Democrats in yellow and Conservatives in blue. Wards in grey were not contested in 2012.

Elections to Weymouth and Portland Borough Council in Dorset took place on Thursday 3 May 2012.

After the election, the composition of the council was:

- Conservative 14
- Labour 11
- Liberal Democrat 8
- Independent 3

== Election result ==
Weymouth and Portland election result 2012
Party	Seats	Gains	Losses	Net gain/loss	Seats %	Votes %	Votes	+/−
Labour	6	5	0	+5	50.0	35.2	5,020	
Liberal Democrats	4	0	3	-3	33.3	25.9	3,683	
Conservative	2	2	3	-1	16.7	29.2	4,159	
Green	0	0	0	0	0.0	4.7	665	
Independent	0	0	1	-1	0.0	4.5	646	
United People's Party	0	0	0	0	0.0	0.5	72	

Gain/loss is relative to the 2008 results.

== Ward results ==
Littlemoor
Party	Candidate	Votes	%	±%
Labour	Rachel Rogers	500	67.66	
Conservative	John Ellis	239	32.34	
Majority		261		
Turnout		746	27.13	
Labour hold		Swing		

Melcombe Regis
Party	Candidate	Votes	%	±%
Conservative	Peter Farrell	431	33.46	
Liberal Democrats	Howard Legg	375	29.11	
Green	Jon Orrell	243	18.87	
Labour	Stewart Pearson	239	18.56	
Majority		56		
Turnout		1,291	25.85	
Conservative gain from Liberal Democrats		Swing		

Farrell had been elected as a Liberal Democrat in 2008.

Preston
Party	Candidate	Votes	%	±%
Conservative	Ian Bruce	998	47.21	
Liberal Democrats	David Mannings	841	39.78	
Labour	Joseph Rookes	275	13.01	
Majority		157		
Turnout		2,140	49.19	
Conservative gain from Liberal Democrats		Swing		

Radipole
Party	Candidate	Votes	%	±%
Liberal Democrats	Ian Roebuck	554	50.87	
Labour Co-op	Andy Hutchings	208	19.10	
Conservative	Alison Scott	180	16.53	
Independent	Graham Winter	147	13.50	
Majority		346		
Turnout		1,094	35.94	
Liberal Democrats hold		Swing		

Tophill West
Party	Candidate	Votes	%	±%
Labour	Ray Nowak	394	36.52	
Independent	Tim Woodcock	315	29.19	
Conservative	Richard Paisley	298	27.62	
United People's Party	Jo Bray	72	6.67	
Majority		79		
Turnout		1,085	26.49	
Labour gain from Conservative		Swing		

Underhill
Party	Candidate	Votes	%	±%
Labour	Sandy West	404	55.34	
Independent	Robert Hughes	184	25.21	
Conservative	Tim Munro	142	19.45	
Majority		220		
Turnout		734	27.14	
Labour gain from Independent		Swing		

Munro (incumbent) had been elected as an Independent in 2008.

Westham East
Party	Candidate	Votes	%	±%
Labour	Mike Byatt	307	34.23	
Liberal Democrats	Oz Kanji	248	27.65	
Conservative	Andrew Manvell	209	23.30	
Green	Jane Burnet	133	14.83	
Majority		59		
Turnout		904	31.12	
Labour gain from Liberal Democrats		Swing		

Westham North
Party	Candidate	Votes	%	±%
Liberal Democrats	Ryan Hope	706	47.13	
Labour	Lindsay Drage	502	33.51	
Conservative	Jean Woodward	290	19.36	
Majority		204		
Turnout		1,512	35.02	
Liberal Democrats hold		Swing		

Westham West
Party	Candidate	Votes	%	±%
Liberal Democrats	Gill Taylor	522	54.04	
Labour	Michael Wheller	317	32.82	
Conservative	Sonia Cash	127	13.15	
Majority		205		
Turnout		1,024	32.69	
Liberal Democrats hold		Swing		

Weymouth East
Party	Candidate	Votes	%	±%
Liberal Democrats	John Birtwhistle	362	36.42	
Conservative	Geoffery Smith	322	32.39	
Labour	Michael Frost	201	20.22	
Green	David Smith	109	10.97	
Majority		40		
Turnout		1,007	34.77	
Liberal Democrats hold		Swing		

Weymouth West
Party	Candidate	Votes	%	±%
Labour	Colin Huckle	656	47.13	
Conservative	Nigel Reed	481	34.55	
Green	Brian Heatley	180	12.93	
Liberal Democrats	Richard Shrubb	75	5.39	
Majority		175		
Turnout		1,400	34.65	
Labour gain from Conservative		Swing		

Wyke Regis
Party	Candidate	Votes	%	±%
Labour	Kate Wheller	1,017	69.71	
Conservative	John Worth	442	30.29	
Majority		575		
Turnout		1,475	33.52	
Labour gain from Conservative		Swing		
