= Aubrey Comben =

Australian rules footballer, born 1904

Personal information
- Full name: Aubrey Owen Comben
- Born: 1 September 1904; Werribee, Victoria
- Died: 17 April 1972 (aged 67); Werribee, Victoria
- Original team: Werribee
- Height: 173 cm (5 ft 8 in)
- Weight: 66 kg (146 lb)

Playing career^{1}
Years	Club	Games (Goals)
1926–1928	Geelong	6 (2)
- ^{1} Playing statistics correct to the end of 1928.

Aubrey Owen Comben (1 September 1904 – 17 April 1972) was an Australian rules footballer who played for the Geelong Football Club in the Victorian Football League (VFL).
