= William Brymer (politician) =

British politician

Brymer in 1895.

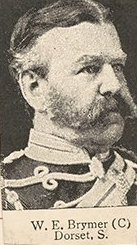

William Ernest Brymer (20 May 1840 – 9 May 1909) was an English Conservative politician who sat in the House of Commons in two stages between 1874 and 1906.

Brymer was born at Fordingbridge, Hampshire, the son of John Brymer of Burgate House, Fordingbridge, and his wife, Eliza Mary Tugwell, only daughter of George Tugwell of Crowe Hall, near Bath. He was educated at Harrow School and at Trinity College, Cambridge.

He was a J.P. for Dorset, and a captain in the Dorset Yeomanry Cavalry. He was patron of the rectories of Charlton Mackrell, Somerset, and Child Okeford, Dorset, and the vicarage of Puddletown, Dorset. He was a prominent Freemason, being a Deputy Provincial Grand Master, Grand Superintendent of the Province and Provincial Grand Mark Mason.

In the 1874 general election Brymer was elected Member of Parliament for Dorchester and held the seat until it was replaced under the Redistribution of Seats Act 1885. He was High Sheriff of Dorset in 1887. In 1891, Brymer was elected Member of Parliament for South Dorset and held the seat until 1906.

Brymer lived at Ilsington House in Puddletown. He died at Jerez, Spain, at the age of 69, he had gone to Spain to recuperate after having health problems but died of bronchitis with complications.

Parliament of the United Kingdom
Preceded by Charles Napier Sturt	Member of Parliament for Dorchester; 1874–1885	constituency abolished
Preceded by Charles J. T. Hambro	Member of Parliament for South Dorset; 1891–1906	Succeeded by Thomas Scarisbrick
Honorary titles
Preceded by Thomas Merthyr Guest	High Sheriff of Dorset; 1887	Succeeded by George Troyte-Bullock
