= Ian Bruce (politician) =

British politician (born 1947)

Member of Parliament for South Dorset
- In office 11 June 1987 – 14 May 2001
- Preceded by: Viscount Cranborne
- Succeeded by: Jim Knight

Personal details
- Born: 14 March 1947 (age 79)
- Party: Conservative
- Spouse: Hazel Bruce
- Education: University of Bradford

Ian Cameron Bruce (born 14 March 1947) is a British Conservative party politician, who represented South Dorset in parliament from 1987 to 2001.

== Life and career ==
He attended Chelmsford Technical High School and studied Electronics at the University of Bradford, then completed an HNC in Electronics at Mid-Essex Technical College. He was a student apprentice at Marconi in Chelmsford from 1965 to 1968, and for the next five years had work study roles at that company, Pye Unicam, Sainsbury's and BEPI (part of the Pye Group). From 1973 to 1975, he was a product manager at Sinclair.

Having stood for the Labour seat of Burnley in 1983, he was narrowly defeated by Labour candidate Peter Pike. He was elected as the Conservative Party Member of Parliament for South Dorset in 1987. In 1997 he won the seat with a slim majority of 77 votes, but was defeated at the 2001 general election by Jim Knight.

In the 2004 European Parliament election, he was the fifth of six in the Conservative Party's list for the Yorkshire and the Humber region, but was not elected.

He married Hazel in 1969. They are both former local councillors on Weymouth and Portland Borough Council and have had four children together.

Parliament of the United Kingdom
Preceded by Viscount Cranborne	Member of Parliament for South Dorset; 1987–2001	Succeeded by Jim Knight
