= Melcombe Regis =

Area of Weymouth, England

Coordinates: 50.61882°N 2.45369°W

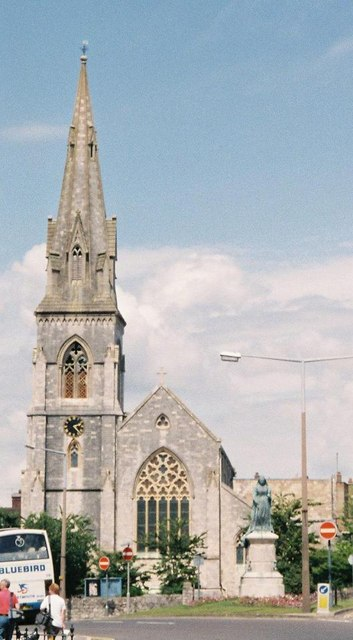
- St. John's Church, Melcombe Regis in 1992

- Location within Dorset
- OS grid reference: SY6880
- Civil parish: Weymouth
- Unitary authority: Dorset
- Ceremonial county: Dorset
- Region: South West
- Country: England
- Sovereign state: United Kingdom
- Post town: WEYMOUTH
- Postcode district: DT4
- Dialling code: 01305
- Police: Dorset
- Fire: Dorset and Wiltshire
- Ambulance: South Western
- UK Parliament: South Dorset

Melcombe Regis is an area of Weymouth in Dorset, England. Situated on the north shore of Weymouth Harbour and originally part of the waste of Radipole, it seems only to have developed as a significant settlement and seaport in the 13th century.

== History ==
Melcombe Regis received a charter as a borough in 1268.

Melcombe was one of the first points of entry of the Black Death into England in the summer of 1348 (the disease was possibly carried there by infected soldiers and sailors returning from the Hundred Years' War, or from a visiting spice ship).

The two boroughs, Melcombe on the north shore and Weymouth on the south, were joined as a double borough in 1571, after which time the name Weymouth came to serve for them both. Nevertheless, Melcombe Regis remained a separate parish and became a civil parish in 1866. In 1911 the parish had a population of 10,952. On 1 April 1920 the parish was abolished and merged with Weymouth.

After two centuries of decline, the town's fortunes were dramatically revived by the patronage of the Duke of Gloucester, brother of King George III, in the 1780s, and then of the King himself, who regularly used the town as a holiday resort between 1789 and 1811. He is commemorated by a prominent statue on the Esplanade, or sea-front, recording the gratitude of the inhabitants, and by the locally well-known Osmington White Horse. The well-known terraces of large late Georgian town houses on the Esplanade date from this period, with additional building later in the 19th century. The town has the Regis name.

The town was well established as a successful resort by the time that George's visits ceased, and has continued as such to the present day.

Weymouth & Melcombe Regis was used as a base for Allied troops in the D-Day landings of World War II, and has since operated on and off as a cross-channel ferry terminus.

== Politics ==
In the UK national parliament, Melcombe Regis ward is within the South Dorset constituency.

After 2019 structural changes to local government in England, Melcombe Regis ward elects 1 member to Dorset Council.

== See also ==
- Regis (Place)
- List of place names with royal patronage in the United Kingdom
- Portland
- List of boroughs in Dorset
