= Weymouth and Portland =

Former non-metropolitan district and borough in England

Coordinates: 50.5666°N 2.4541°W

Weymouth and Portland Borough of Weymouth and Portland
- Non-metropolitan district and borough
- Coat of arms

- Weymouth and Portland shown within Dorset
- Sovereign state: United Kingdom
- Constituent country: England
- Region: South West England
- Non-metropolitan county: Dorset
- Admin HQ: Weymouth
- Incorporated: 1 April 1974
- Abolished: 1 April 2019

Government
  - Type: Non-metropolitan district council
  - Body: Weymouth and Portland Borough Council
  - Leadership: Leader & Cabinet ( )

Area
  - Total: 16.1 sq mi (41.8 km^{2})

Population (mid-2018)
  - Total: 65,800
  - Density: 4,080/sq mi (1,570/km^{2})
  - Ethnicity: 98.5% White
- Time zone: UTC0 (GMT)
  - Summer (DST): UTC+1 (BST)
- ONS code: 19UJ (ONS); E07000053 (GSS)
- OS grid reference: SY6784374258
- Website: www.weymouth.gov.uk

Weymouth and Portland was a local government district with borough status in Dorset, England from 1974 to 2019. It consisted of the resort of Weymouth and the Isle of Portland, and included the areas of Wyke Regis, Preston, Melcombe Regis, Upwey, Broadwey, Southill, Nottington, Westham, Radipole, Chiswell, Castletown, Fortuneswell, Weston, Southwell and Easton; the latter six being on the Isle of Portland.

In Portland Harbour is the Weymouth and Portland National Sailing Academy, where the sailing events at the 2012 Olympics took place. The main reason that the resort was chosen to be an Olympic venue was that the Sailing Academy had only recently been built, so no new venue would need to be provided. Weymouth and Portland's waters have also been credited by the Royal Yachting Association as the best in Northern Europe.

Weymouth and Portland have been twinned with the town of Holzwickede in North Rhine-Westphalia, Germany, since 1986, and the French town of Louviers, in the department of Eure in Normandy, since 1959.

== Politics ==
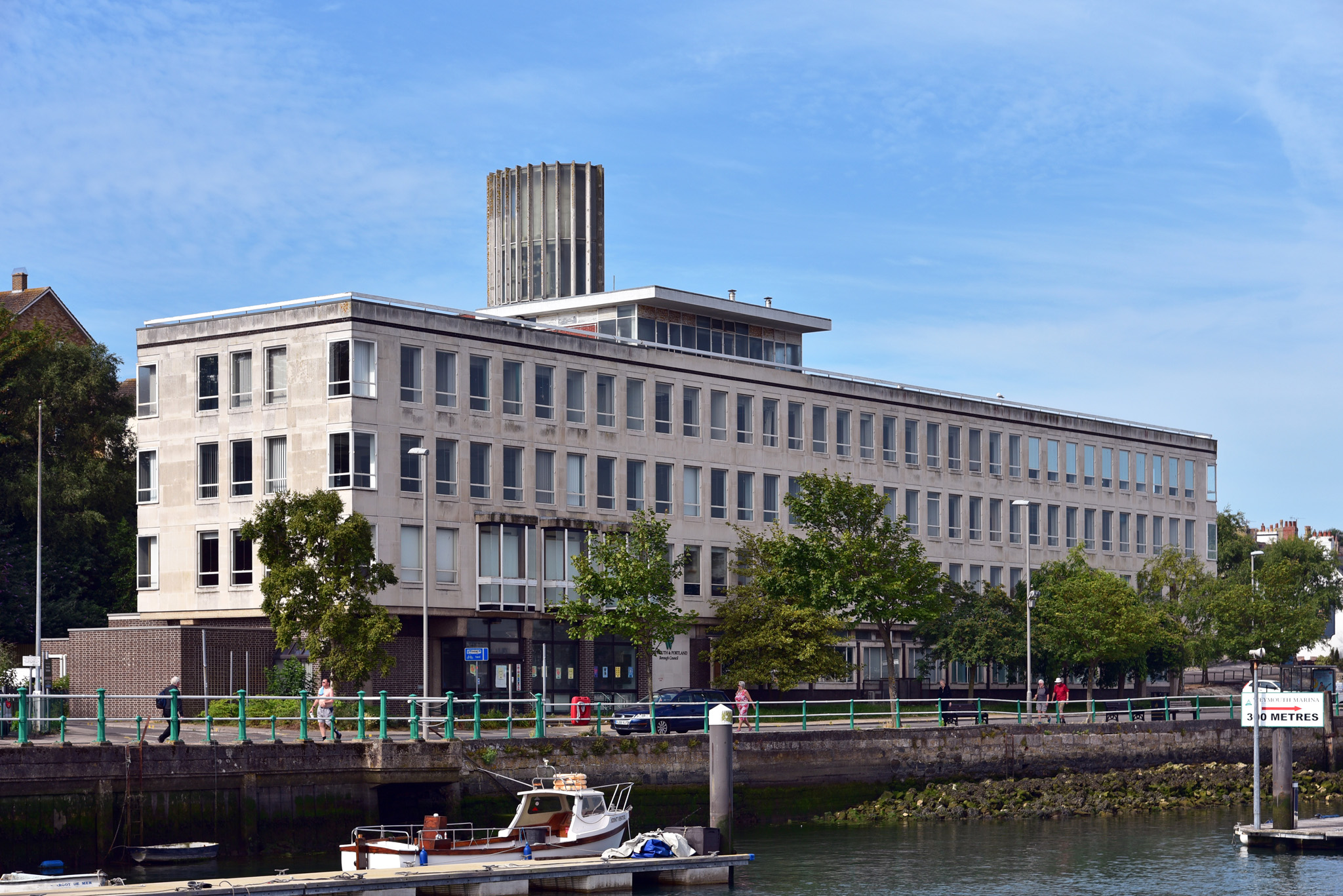
Council Offices, North Quay: Council's headquarters until 2016

The district of Weymouth and Portland was formed on 1 April 1974 under the Local Government Act 1972, which merged the borough of Weymouth and Melcombe Regis and the Portland urban district. The district was divided into 15 wards for elections—12 of those in Weymouth, and three in Portland. Elections took place in a four-year cycle; one third of the councillors in all but three wards retire or seek re-election in years one, two and three, and county council elections were held in year four. In its final term the District Council was a multi-party administration under the leadership of the Conservatives.

Party	Seats
Conservative	14
Labour	12
Liberal Democrat	6
Independent	2
UKIP	1
Greens	1

For most of its existence, the council had its main offices at the Municipal Offices (later renamed the Council Offices) on North Quay, which had been completed in 1971 for the Weymouth and Melcombe Regis Borough Council, one of the council's predecessors.

Weymouth and Portland and Purbeck districts were in the South Dorset parliamentary constituency, created in 1885. It was in the South West England constituency of the European Parliament.

The borough and its council was abolished on 1 April 2019 and, together with the other 4 districts outside the greater Bournemouth area, formed a new Dorset unitary authority. At the same time, a town council serving only Weymouth and its suburbs was formed, called Weymouth Town Council.

== See also ==
- Weymouth and Portland Borough Council elections
- List of churches in Weymouth and Portland
