= Hale Park =

Country house and landscape park in Hale, Hampshire, England

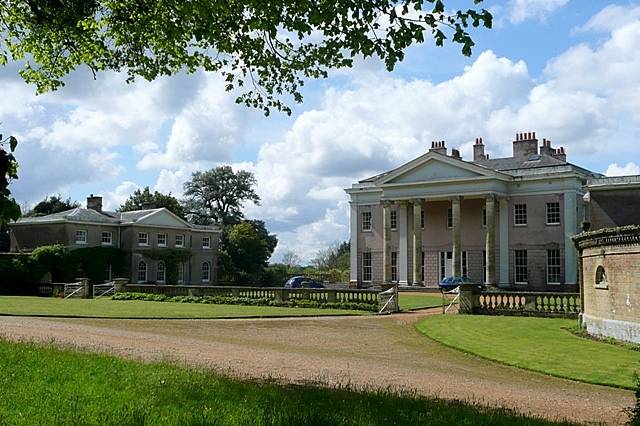
- Hale House

- Location within Hampshire

General information
- Status: Completed
- Location: Hale, Hampshire, United Kingdom
- Coordinates: 50.9654°N 1.7391°W
- Completed: c. 1715
- Client: Thomas Archer

Design and construction
- Architect: Thomas Archer
- Designations: Grade I listed

Hale Park is a country house and landscape park in the village of Hale, Hampshire. It was designed and built by Thomas Archer around 1715.

== Hale House ==
Hale House was built by Thomas Archer, Groom Porter to Queen Anne, and Baroque architect, who bought the manor of Hale sometime after 1712. He demolished an Elizbethan mansion which had been designed by John Webb for the Penruddock family. The house was designed and built by Archer around 1715. It was remodelled around 1792 by the architect Henry Holland. Other alterations were made in the early and late 19th century, by the Goff family, who owned Hale Park from 1837 until the early 20th century.

The house has two storeys and seven bay-windows at the front. It has cement rendered walls, a portico with pediment and Ionic columns (a drawing of 1850 shows Corinthian capitals), and a slate roof. The service wings flank the house but are detached. They also are of two storeys, with cement rendered walls and slate roofs.

It is now a Grade I listed building. The house is in private ownership and is not open to the public.

== Hale Park ==
The grounds were laid out from about 1715 by Thomas Archer. During the 19th century and early 20th century the grounds were simplified and new features were added to the gardens.

The park includes a circular pool surrounded by yew hedging and topiary shapes. There is a Ha ha towards the south. The park contains a number of copses, and lodges including the South Lodge which has a Doric portico. Tree avenues cross the park, including a lime avenue which runs north east to Hatchett Lodge, and extends beyond park. The Mount is possibly from the 17th-century house and is enclosed by hedging.

At one time there was an ice house in the park.

The Park is Grade II*on the Register of Historic Parks and Gardens.

== Saint Mary's Church ==
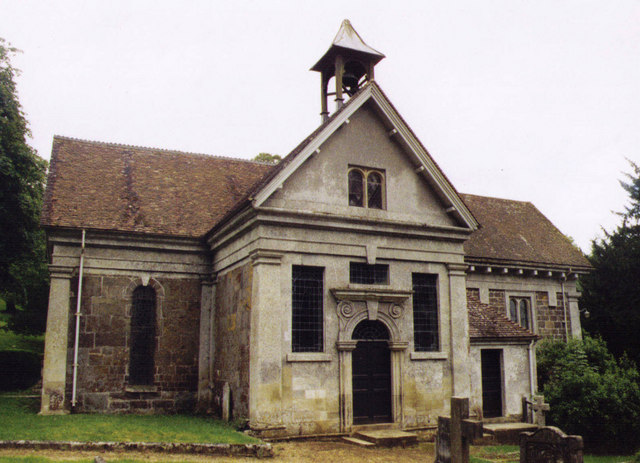
St Mary's Church, Hale

The parish church of Hale is in Hale Park to the north-west of the house. It was originally a medieval church modified in the 17th century, and then rebuilt in 1717 by Thomas Archer. The older nave and chancel were retained, and new transepts added. It was reroofed in the 19th century when a bellcote was added on the north transept. There are stained glass windows in the chancel and south transept.

== Owners ==
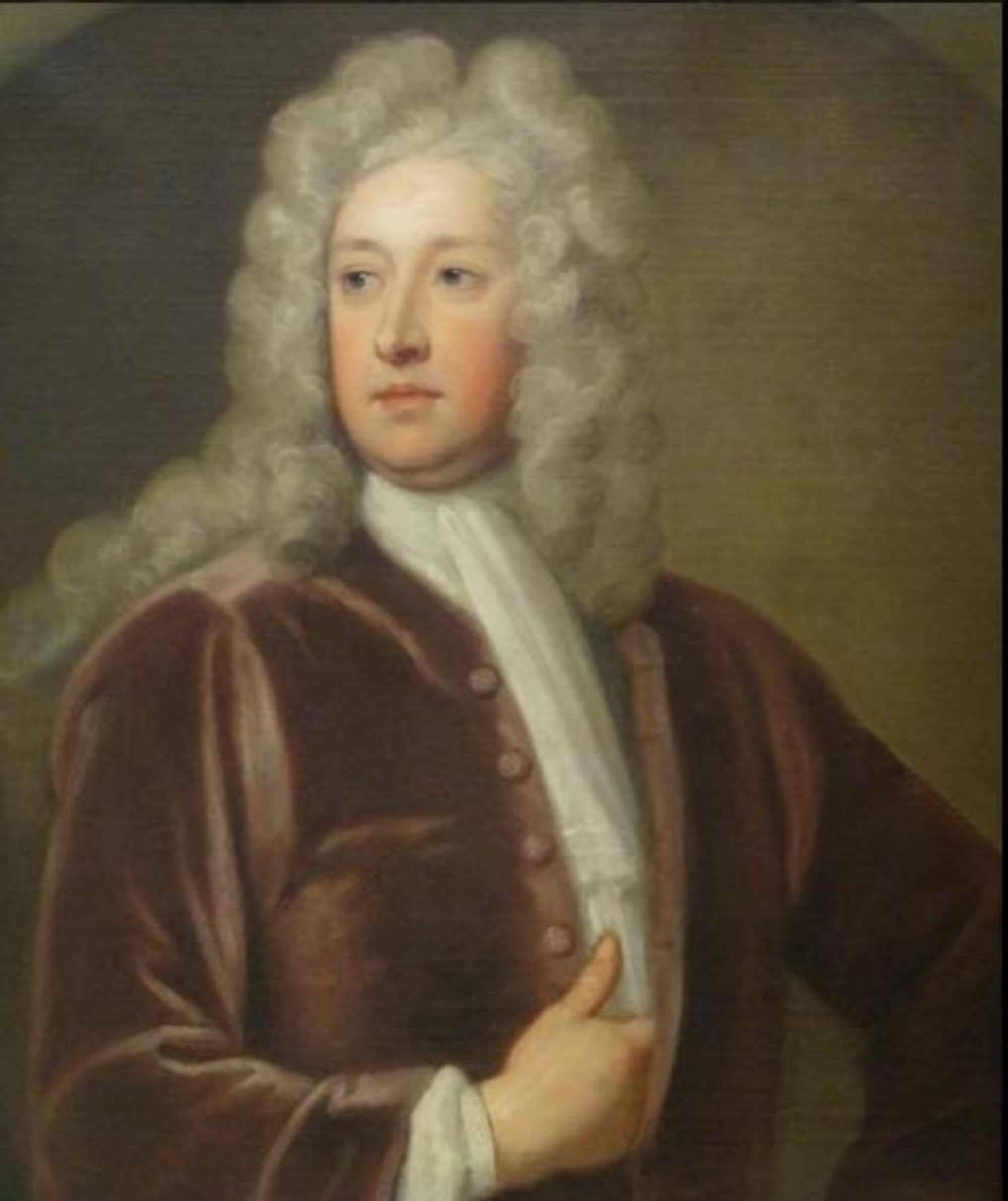
Thomas Archer

Thomas Archer built Hale House in about 1715. He was described as a "gentleman architect" as he came from a wealthy aristocratic family. He also held a very prestigious and profitable position in the Royal household given to him in 1705 by Queen Anne. He travelled abroad extensively. It was during his travels between 1691 and 1695 that he gained some of his architectural ideas. On his return he was quickly established as a leading architect and landscape designer. His aristocratic upbringing made him particularly appealing to the landed gentry as he belonged to the same world. Some of the churches he designed were St.Paul's Deptford, Birmingham Cathedral, St John's, Smith Square London and St.Mary's Hale.

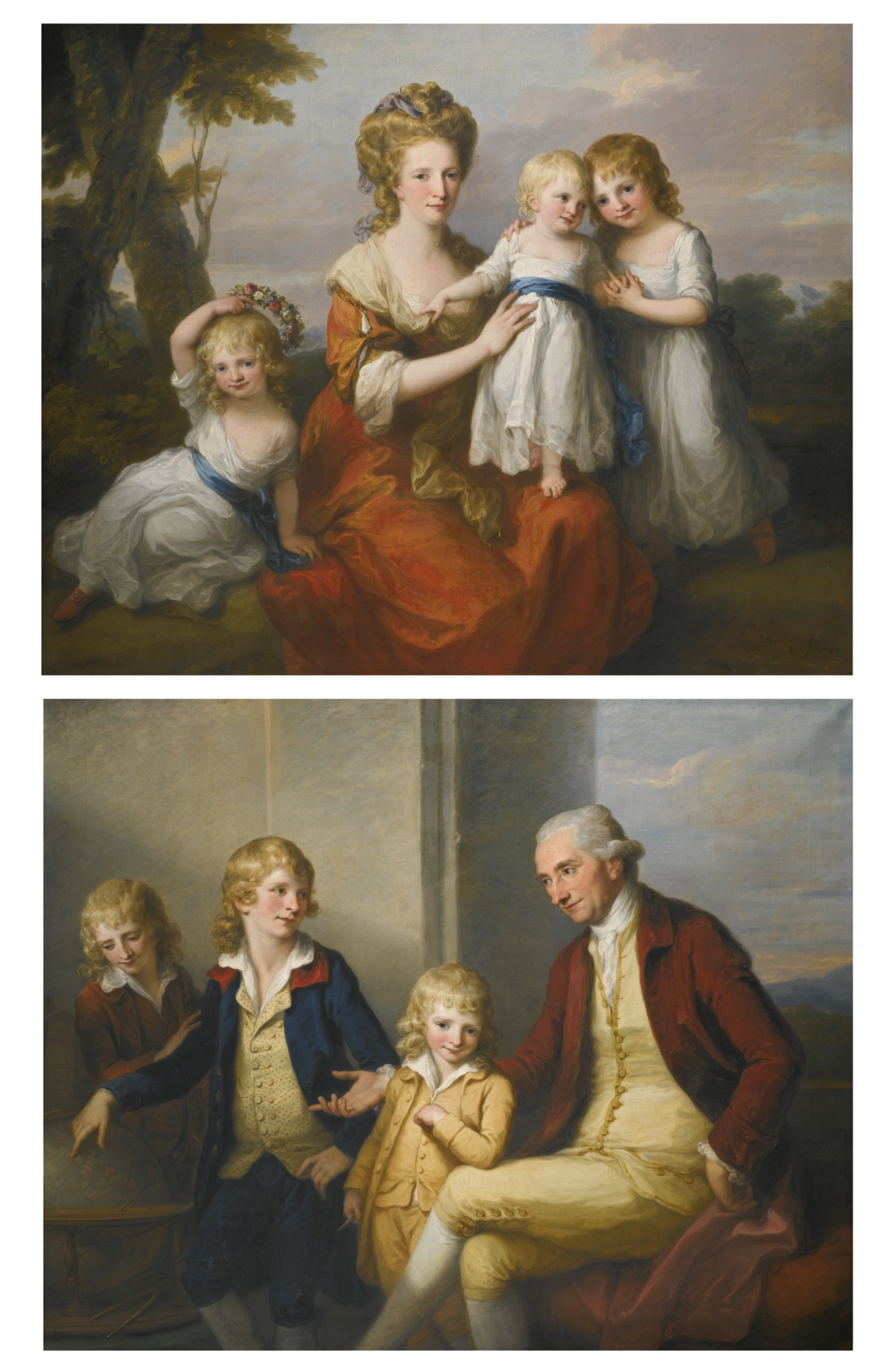
Top Mary May and her three daughters. Bottom Joseph May and their three sons

In 1700 he married Eleanor Archer, the only child of John Archer of Welford Park. Thomas remodelled the front of Welford House by adding a storey and constructing the Ionian columns that adorn the front façade. Unfortunately his wife died in 1702 and in 1706 he married Ann Chaplin, the daughter of John Chaplin of Tathwell. The couple had no children so when he died in 1743 he left his property to his nephew Henry Archer.

Henry Archer was the son of Thomas's brother Andrew Archer. He was a barrister and member of Parliament for Warwick for thirty years. In 1743 he married Lady Elizabeth Montagu, daughter of George Montagu, 1st Earl of Halifax. The couple had no children so when he died in 1768 he left the house to his nephew Andrew Archer. In 1776 he sold the house to Joseph May shortly after Joseph's return from Portugal.

Joseph May was a wealthy merchant who owned a wine factory in Lisbon. In 1764 he married Mary Coppendale. The couple had ten children. After they bought Hale Park in 1776 they commissioned the famous architect Henry Holland to remodel the house. Joseph became very proud of his house and in 1780 he asked Angelica Kauffmann, a well-known artist of her time to paint two pictures of the family at Hale Park. They were probably commissioned to hang in their recently refurbished house.

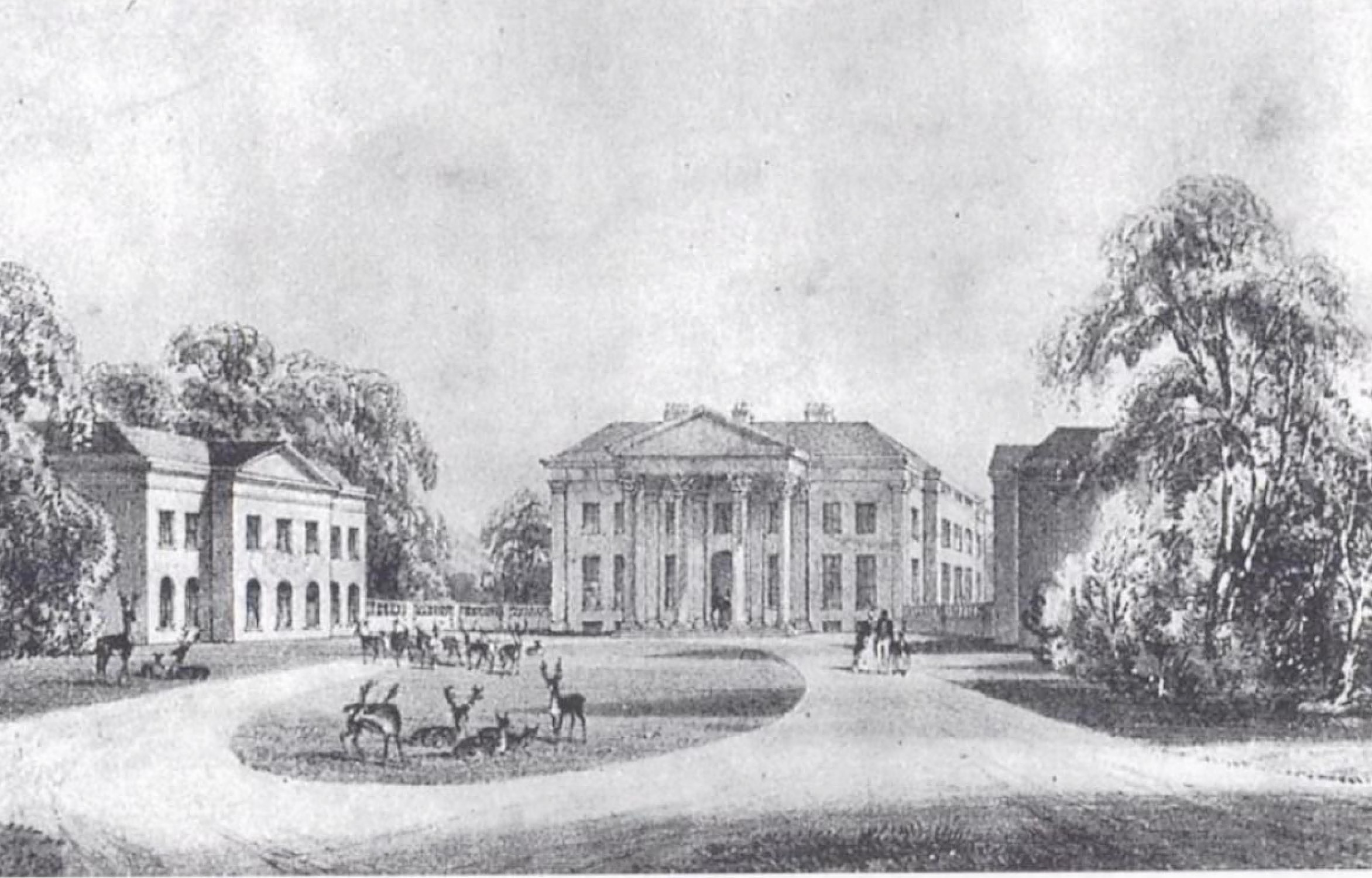
Engraving of Hale House

When Joseph died in 1796 he left his estates to his wife Mary and she continued to live at Hale Park with some of her daughters. She died in 1824 and her eldest son Joseph Hale who had married Frances Maria Stert, inherited the house. He is shown in the picture as the second child from the left with his father. When he died in 1830 his eldest son Joseph May who had married Elizabeth Katherine Lyons-Montgomery became the owner. On his death in 1837 the property was sold to Joseph Goff.

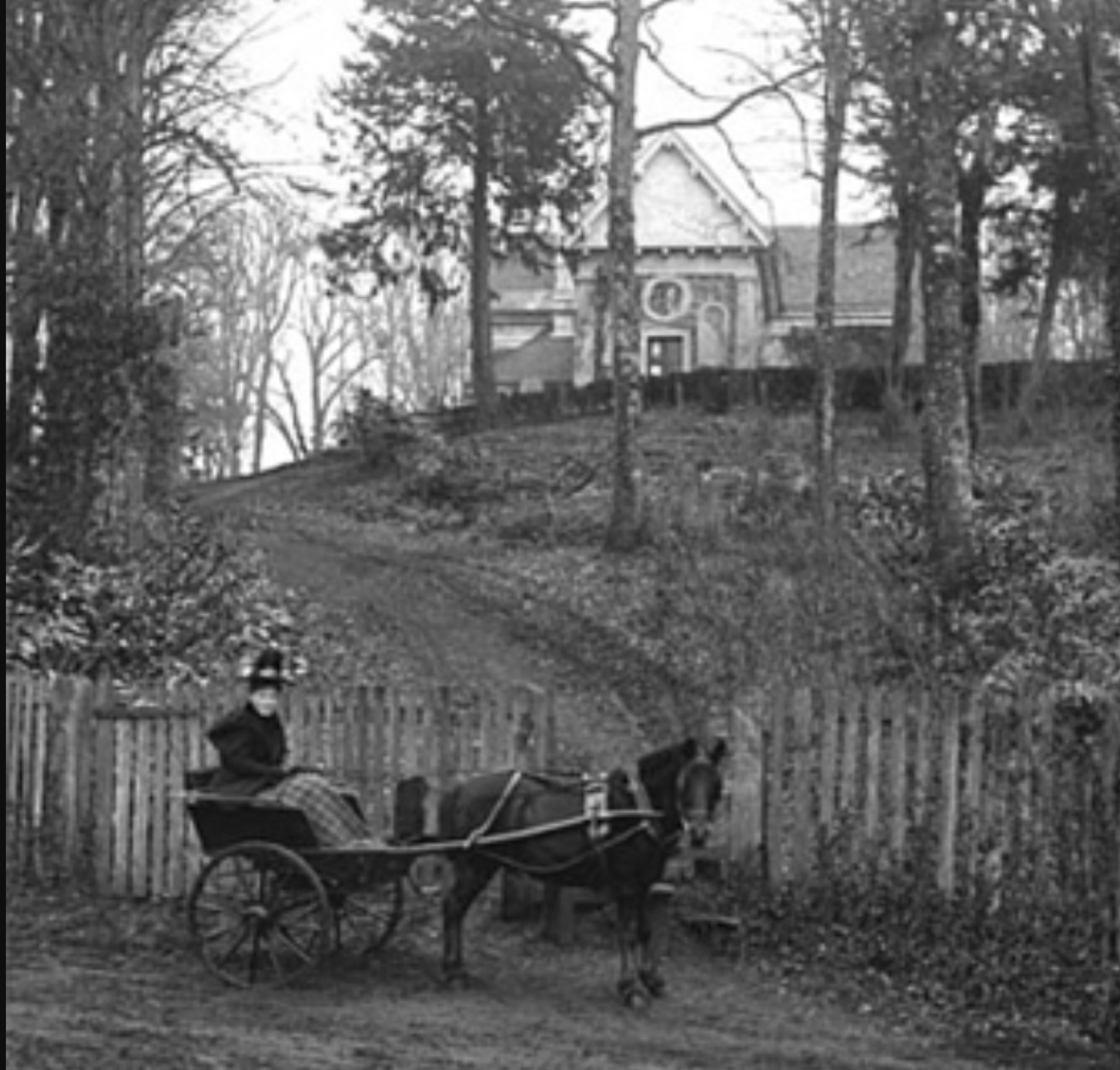
Lady Adela Goff 1895. She is in a pony trap with St Mary's Church in the background.

Joseph Goff was a wealthy landowner who inherited the estates of his father in 1833. In 1816 he married Jane Stannus. The couple had nine children. An engraving was made of the house by the Goff family which is shown. When Joseph died in 1875 the will stated that the property would be passed to his eldest son Joseph Chandler Goff who had married Lady Adela Knox, daughter of Sir Thomas Knox, Earl of Ranfurly. However he predeceased his father so it was inherited by the grandson Joseph Granville Stuart Goff. He appears to have taken control of the estate for some years but died at the age of thirty in 1881. Hale Park was then inherited by his brother Gerald Lionel Joseph Goff who was a Colonel in the Army. He did not expect to be the heir so he continued his military career and died in the Boer War in 1899. It seems that the estate was run for many years by his mother Lady Adela Goff whose picture is shown. She is in a pony trap with St Mary's Church in the background. When she died in 1911 the property was rented to Geoffrey Skeffington Smyth.

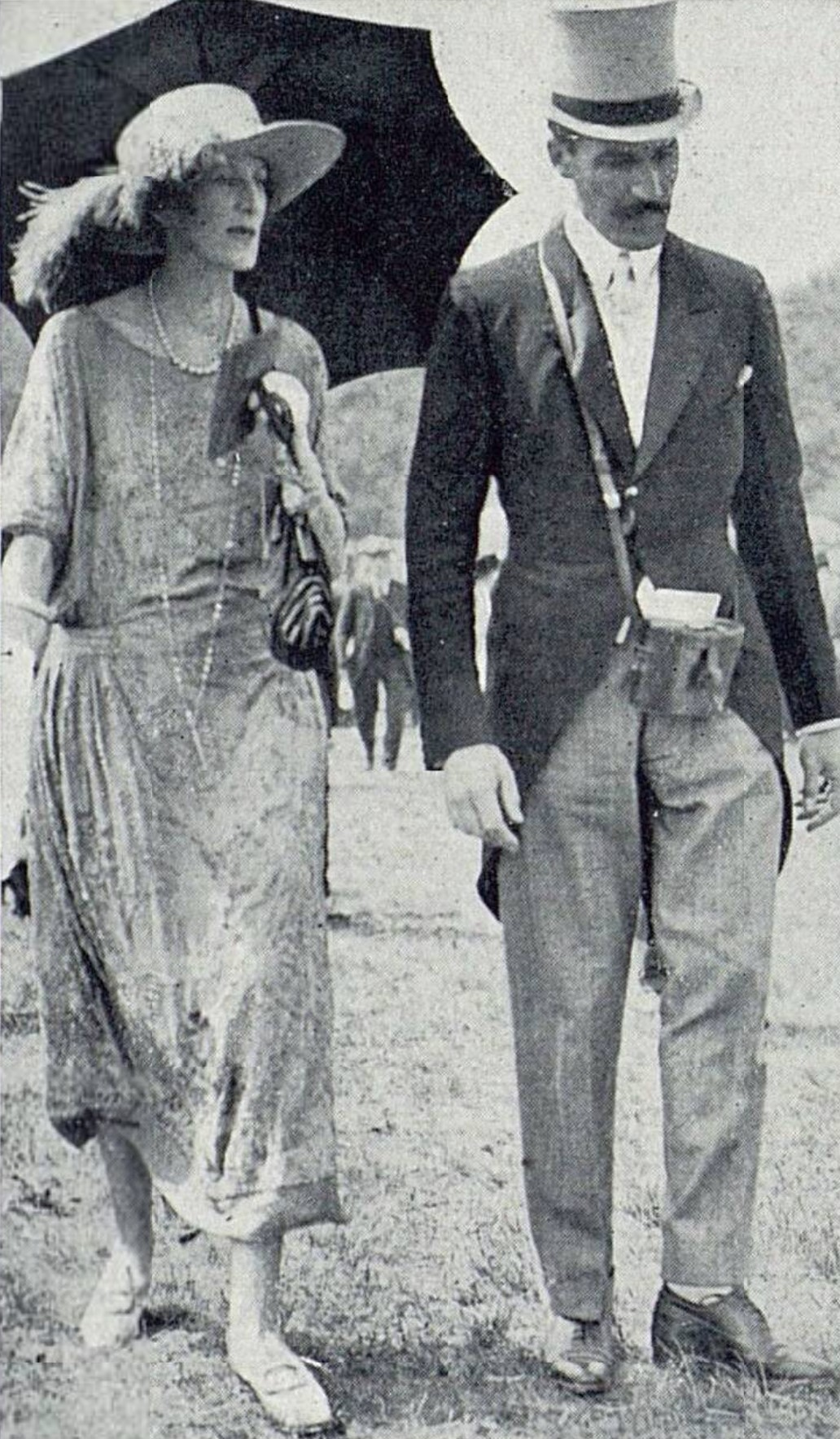
Violet and Geoffrey Skeffington Smyth

Geoffrey Skeffington Smyth was a distinguished army officer in his youth and won several military awards including the DSO. In 1904 he married Violet Monckton-Arundell who was the daughter of George Monckton-Arundell, 7th Viscount Galway. She had a large fortune inherited from her father. In 1906 Geoffrey retired from the Army and he and Violet appear to have lived as socialites. They frequently appear in the social pages of the newspapers of that day. A photo of them is shown. Their son Terence Skeffington-Smyth who grew up at Hale Park lived a similar lifestyle and inherited a fortune from his mother when she died in 1930.

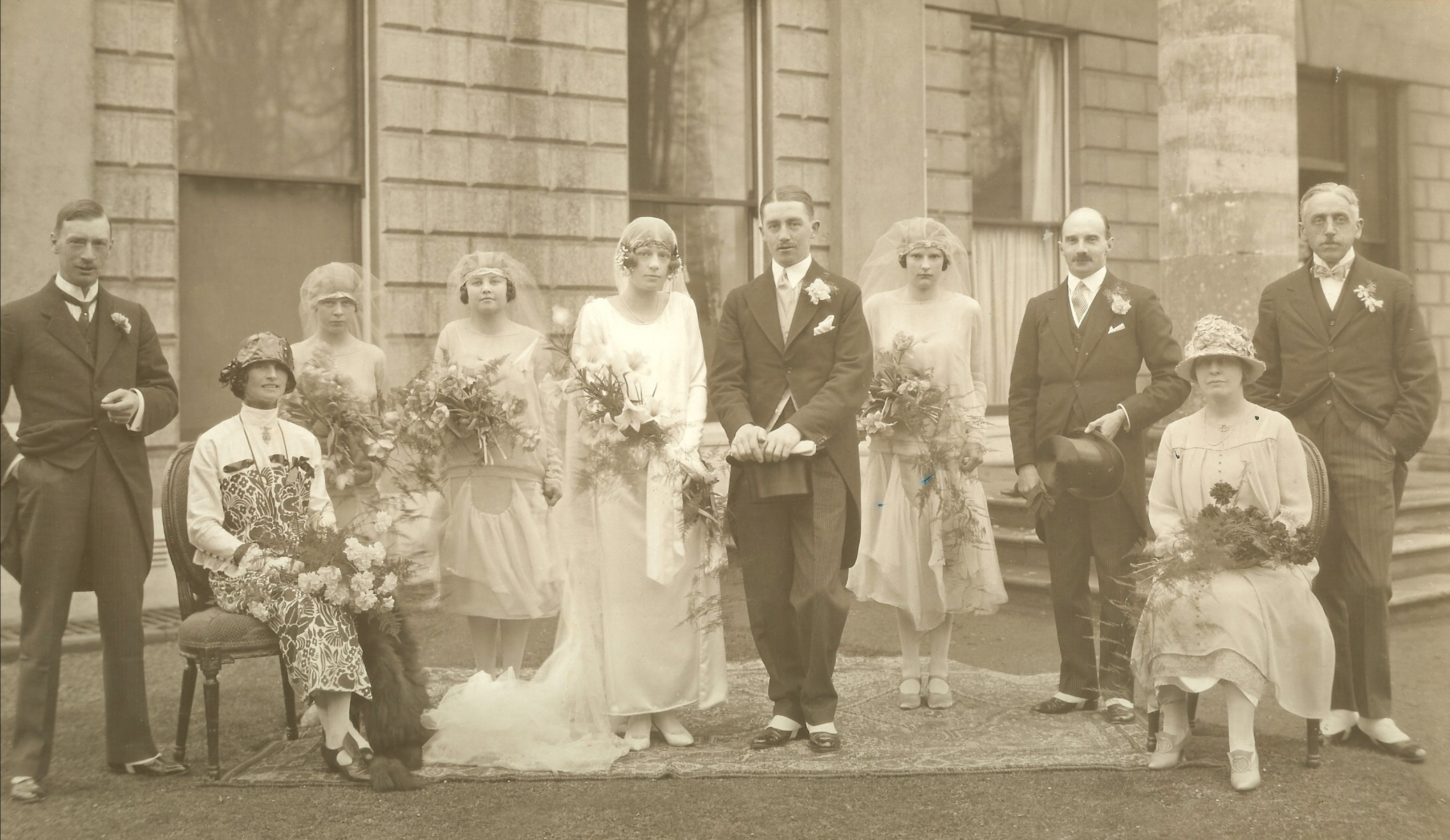
Rosemary Wright wedding at Hale Park 1925. Major Wright and his wife Lucy are on the extreme left of the group

In 1920 Hale Park was sold to Major Ernest Beresford Fitzherbert Wright, who was the owner until about 1926. He had married Lucy Adeline Fox in 1899 and the couple had five children. Their daughter Rosemary married Alfred Reginald Claude Kirby in 1925 at Hale Park. A photo is shown of the wedding party at the front of the house near the steps. Major Wright and his wife Lucy are on the extreme left of the group.

In 1926 the house was sold to the Booth-Jones family who owned it for the next 50 years. Captain Thomas Vernon Booth-Jones was an officer of the Royal Berkshire Regiment. In 1924 he married Margaret Wallace Colville, the daughter of Archibald Colville, a wealthy Glasgow steel industrialist. The couple had three sons. Margaret was interested in the history of the area and wrote a book on St Mary's Church and one on the local parishes.
