= Hale, Hampshire =

Village and parish in Hampshire, England

Coordinates: 50.973°N 1.728°W

Hale
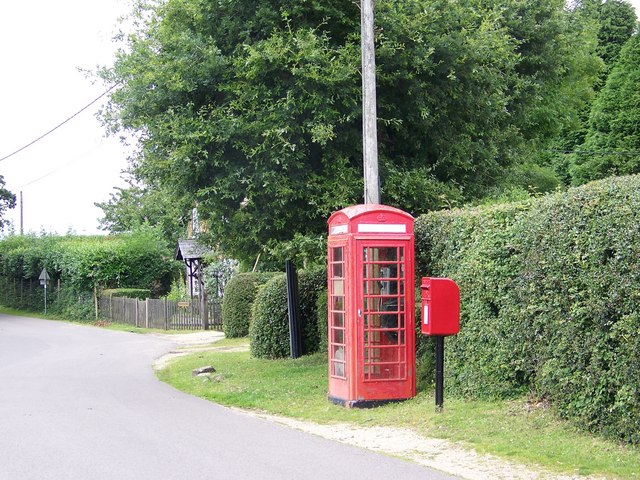
- Street Scene, Hale

- Location within Hampshire
- Population: 578; 519 (2011 Census)
- OS grid reference: SU192191
- Civil parish: Hale
- District: New Forest
- Shire county: Hampshire
- Region: South East
- Country: England
- Sovereign state: United Kingdom
- Post town: FORDINGBRIDGE
- Postcode district: SP6
- Dialling code: 01725
- Police: Hampshire and Isle of Wight
- Fire: Hampshire and Isle of Wight
- Ambulance: South Central
- UK Parliament: New Forest West

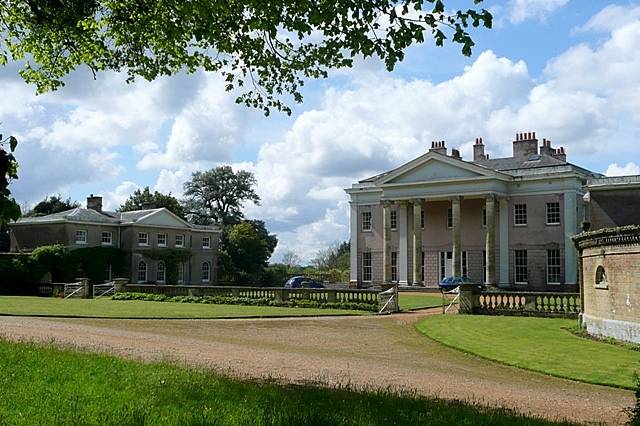
Hale Park House

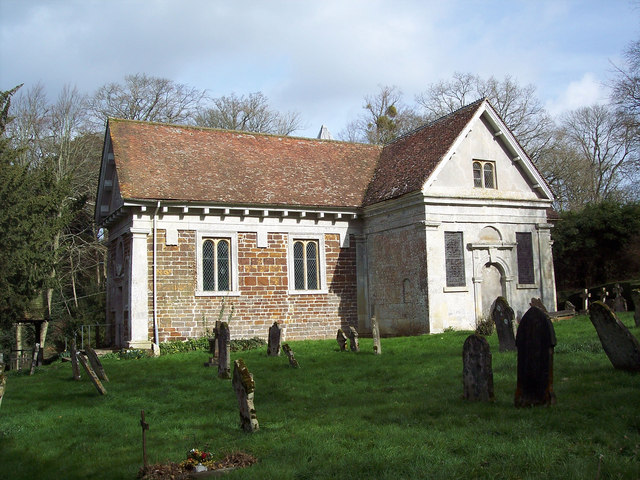
St Mary's church

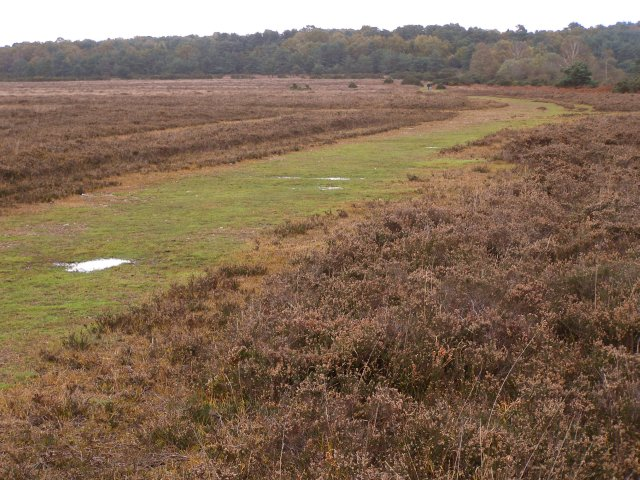
Hale Purlieu

Hale is a small village and civil parish in Hampshire, England. It lies on the border of the New Forest, overlooking the valley of the River Avon. The village is about 3.5 miles (5.6 km) north-east of the town of Fordingbridge, and about 8 miles (13 km) south of the city of Salisbury. Within the parish stands Hale House, a large 18th-century mansion which was the country house of architect Thomas Archer, who also rebuilt Hale church in 1717.

== Overview ==
Hale is a village to the northeast of Fordingbridge in an area of woodland, to the east of the River Avon. It is a scattered community with some thatched cottages around the green, a village hall, and a Victorian school building which still houses the primary school.

At the centre of the village is Hatchet Green, which is a Site of Special Scientific Interest and a Conservation Area. It contains various tree species including oak, ash, birch, holly, lawson cypress, chestnut and hawthorn. It was taken over by the Parish Council in 1975 because no owner could be traced.

== History ==
The manor of Hale does not appear in the Domesday Book of 1086. However, there was a hide of land in nearby Charford held of the King by Alwi son of Torber. Alwi was also holding West Tytherley at the time of the Domesday Book, and since Richard de Cardenvill, at the beginning of the 13th century, was holding Hale and West Tytherley of the King it is possible that this Charford estate was Hale.

In the 14th century Hale passed by marriage to Sir Robert Brent of Cossington, in whose family the manor remained for about two centuries. Hale was probably sold to one of the Penruddocks in the 16th century. Thus Robert Penruddock, who died childless in 1583, evidently had a lease of the manor and was the first of the family to settle at Hale. Around this time the original mediaeval church was substantially rebuilt, and there is a brass on the floor of the church to Sir John Penruddock, who died 8 March 1600.

In 1631 the classical architect Inigo Jones was commissioned by Sir John Penruddock to remodel the medieval church or St Mary's in Hale as a Tuscan temple along the lines of St Paul's, Covent Garden. It has long been suspected that the church was Jones's, but the proof was only recently discovered by Kate Bennett in a manuscript in the Bodleian Library recording a Latin inscription in the hands of the Penruddock family attributing the church to Jones. (See also Dianne Duggan, 2003, 'Hale Church and St Paul's Church, Covent Garden', Hampshire Studies 58, published by the Hampshire Field Club and Archaeological Society.)

Hale passed by marriage into the Gage family, until Thomas Gage, 1st Viscount Gage of Castlebar in Ireland, apparently sold the manor between 1713 and 1720 to Thomas Archer, Groom Porter to Queen Anne, who at the latter date was licensed to inclose two roads in Hale between South Charford and Woodgreen. Archer demolished the Penruddock's Elizabethan Manor House and built the Palladian style Georgian Mansion which is here today. He also altered and enlarged the church, landscaped the grounds and planted the oldest part of the Lime Avenue. Andrew Archer, 2nd Baron Archer held it before his death in 1778, his heirs being his three daughters. The May family took over in 1789, and the Goff family bought Hale in 1836. Joseph Goff endowed the village school in 1873.

The civil parish of Hale was formed in 1895. Until 1920, Hale was one large estate, and the village was effectively closed to outsiders, with no inn and no shops. In 1920, the estate was divided up and sold in lots. Hale House and its surrounding park still survives as the nucleus of the old estate.

== Hale Park ==
To the west of Hale is Hale Park, home to a Palladian style Georgian Mansion, built by Thomas Archer around 1715 and added to over the years. The village church is to the north-west of the house. It is dedicated to Saint Mary. It is mostly 18th-century in date, but with its 17th-century nave and chancel retained. The house is now owned by Mr Patrick Hickman . He purchased the house and grounds in 1974

== Hale Purlieu ==
Next to Hale is the National Trust common of Hale Purlieu. Hale Purlieu is an area of heath and valley bog with typical flora and fauna. It was for centuries outside of the New Forest – the word "purlieu" means an area which has been "disafforested" and is not subject to forest law. It was brought within the boundary and the Verderers' jurisdiction under the New Forest Act of 1964.
