= North Charford =

Hamlet in Hampshire, England

Coordinates: 50.978°N 1.765°W

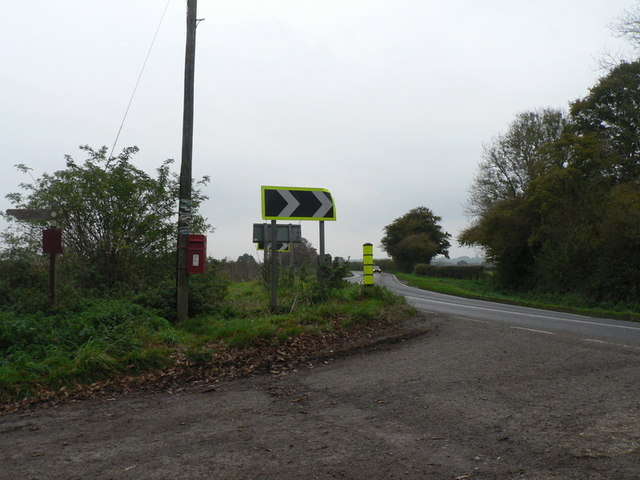
- A338 Road at North Charford

- Location within Hampshire
- OS grid reference: SU166198
- Civil parish: Breamore
- District: New Forest
- Shire county: Hampshire
- Region: South East
- Country: England
- Sovereign state: United Kingdom
- Post town: FORDINGBRIDGE
- Postcode district: SP6
- Dialling code: 01725
- Police: Hampshire and Isle of Wight
- Fire: Hampshire and Isle of Wight
- Ambulance: South Central
- UK Parliament: New Forest West

North Charford is a hamlet in the civil parish of Breamore, in the New Forest district, in Hampshire, England, near the Wiltshire border. Historically the name refers to a manor which is on the west bank of the River Avon.

== History ==
North and South Charford are usually identified with the "Cerdic's ford" which appears twice in the Anglo-Saxon Chronicle. It first is mentioned under the entry for the year 508 when we are told that following a battle to the east "the land as far as Cerdic's ford was named Natanleaga" For the year 519 we are told that "Cerdic and Cynric succeeded to the kingdom [of the West Saxons]; and in the same year they fought against the Britons at a place called Cerdic's ford". If a battle really did take place here then it is possible that the boundary of Hampshire was first established here.

In the time of the Domesday Book of 1086, North Charford (Cerdeford) was a fairly large settlement of 29 households. The lands were split between the Earl of Salisbury and "Alwy son of Turber". That which Alwy owned may subsequently have become the manor of Hale. Richard II was overlord of North Charford in 1397, but subsequently the Bulkeleys claimed the overlordship, asserting that the manor was held of them as of their manor of Nether Burgate and their hundred of Fordingbridge. This was denied by Edward Abarowe, lord of North Charford in 1563, but seventy years later Sir William Bulkeley was stated to be the overlord.

In the beginning of the 13th century Hamo de Bachamton and Geoffrey son of John held the manor conjointly. Around 1280 William Gerberd held the manor, which passed to his heir John Gerberd. Alice was holding it in 1316. Her son William Gerberd sold the manor before 1353 to Walter Abarowe, on whose death it passed to his widow Isabel. She subsequently married Hugh Tyrell, and died in 1370, leaving a son and heir John Abarowe. The manor remained in the Abarowe family down to the 17th century. It was purchased in the 18th century by Thomas Archer, or his nephew Henry Archer, who was holding it at the time of his death in 1768. It then followed the same descent as Hale until the 19th century, when it was sold to John Coventry of Burgate manor.

A chapel was built by the beginning of the 14th century. It is said to have been founded for one priest "to sing in the same chapel for the ease of the inhabitants of the manor of North Chartforde." The chapel with its tithes is mentioned in 1628, but before 1727 it was in ruins, and there is no trace of it at the present day.

North Charford was an ancient parish, usually considered separate from that of South Charford. The population of North Charford in 1870 was just 70 people living in 15 houses. By the beginning of the 20th century North Charford consisted of only a few scattered houses and the old manor-house, converted in 1880 by Professor Wrightson into an agricultural college. In 1931 the parish had a population of 198. On 1 April 1932 the parish was abolished and merged with Breamore and Hale.

Today, the old manor of North Charford is located in the civil parish of Breamore, on the west bank of the River Avon. The Ordnance Survey though, also marks North Charford about one mile to the east in the village of Hale. The ancient parish having comprised land on both the west and east sides of the River Avon.
