= Roehampton House =

Grade I listed building in the United Kingdom

Coordinates: 51.454141°N 0.24251760°W

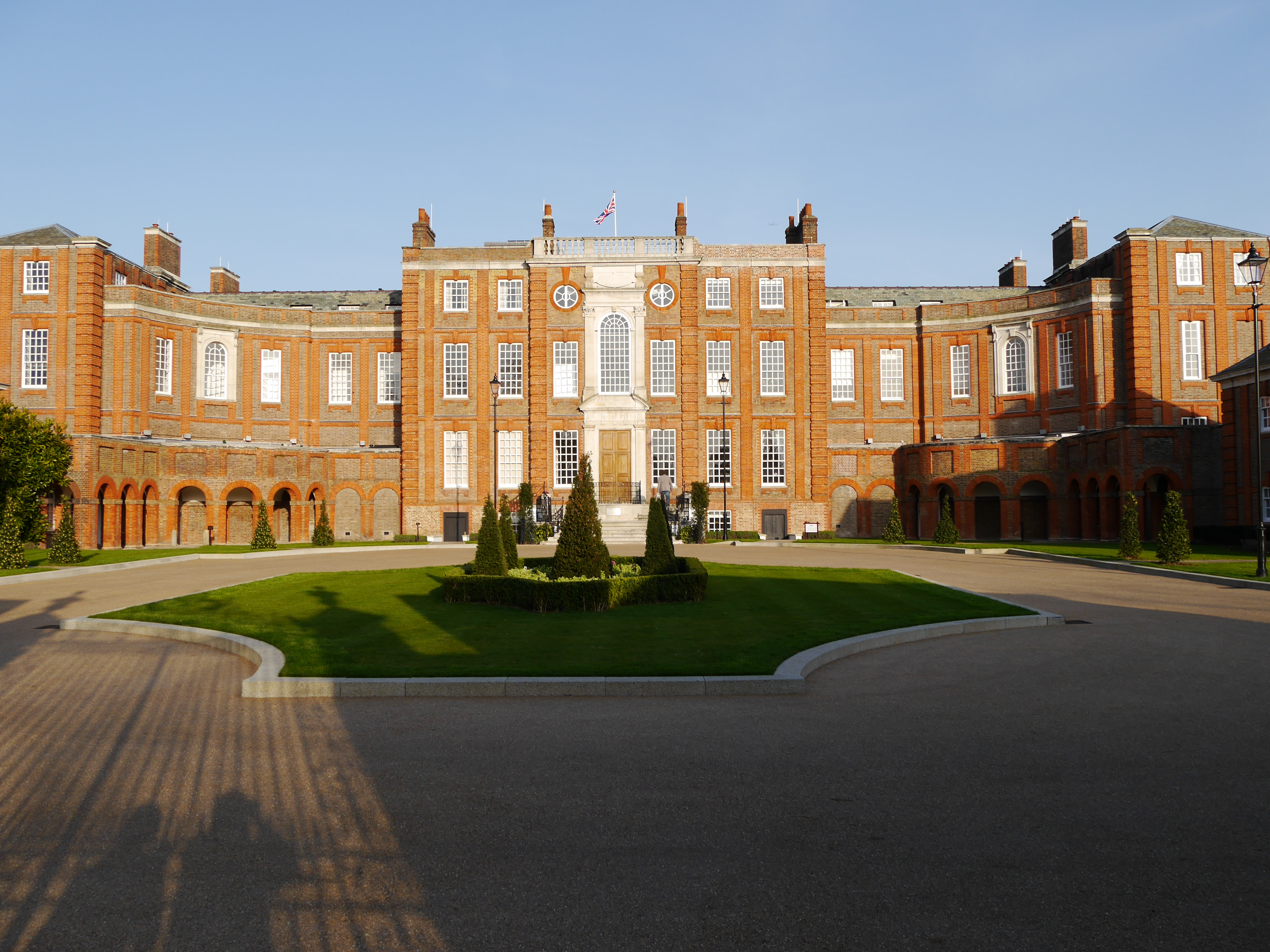
Roehampton House

Roehampton House is a Grade I listed house at Roehampton Lane, Roehampton, London.

What is now the central block of the current building was built between 1710 and 1712 by the architect Thomas Archer and named Roehampton House. It was built on behalf of the merchant Thomas Cary. Cary's father, John, had emigrated to the Colony of Virginia in 1663, and Cary was born there in 1669; both returned to London and by 1690 were running an import and export trading business. Internal features included the surviving 'great staircase' and a two-storey 'painted salon' on the first floor above the entrance hall, decorated with paintings on the walls and ceiling by Sir James Thornhill. On the ground floor, behind the entrance hall, the dining room (with a monumental chimneypiece, reputedly by Grinling Gibbons) extended to the rear (or 'garden front') of the house; it was flanked by a drawing room on one side and a boudoir on the other.

Cary's widow later sold the house to the Earl of Albemarle. In 1771 it was bought by one John Wilkinson, a ship-owner; then his widow sold it in 1791 to William Drake M.P.. The house continued to change hands, and was also rented out to a number of different people, during the first part of the nineteenth century. In 1841 it became the London seat of the Earls of Leven and Melville; the widow of the 9th Earl lived there until her death in 1887.

In the early 20th century the property was bought by Arthur Grenfell, a Canadian financier. From 1910 to 1913, he engaged Sir Edwin Lutyens to make some alterations to the main house and added north and south wings. Historic England notes that these were "a continuation of the Archer style and to a plan close to Archer's original intentions", and that "the Lutyens parts would in themselves merit Grade II*". The estate was again sold in January 1915, to Kenneth Wilson of the Wilson shipping family; but shortly afterwards the house was requisitioned by the War Office for troop accommodation.

Later that year, Mary Eleanor Gwynne Halford successfully petitioned the War Office to release the property to enable her and her fellow trustees to establish a military hospital there, under the patronage of Queen Mary, to rehabilitate amputees and provide them with artificial limbs. Kenneth Wilson allowed the use of the house and its 30 acres of land to the hospital rent free, and in June 1915 the first 25 patients moved in to Queen Mary's Hospital, Roehampton. At this time the soldiers were accommodated in the main house and the limb manufacturers in the basement; however, with access to the upper floors being difficult for patients, the hospital soon began to expand into single-storey huts that were built on the estate.

After the end of the war, in 1920, Wilson sold the house and its grounds to the hospital, which funded the purchase with assistance from the Joint War Committee of the British Red Cross and the Order of St. John. From 1922 the hospital began to admit civilian amputees as well as war pensioners. In 1925 a new purpose-built hospital complex was opened in the grounds of the house, replacing the temporary huts.

In 1939, by provision of an earlier agreement made with the hospital's Governors, the Ministry of Pensions took over responsibility for the maintenance and administration of the hospital. In February 1944 a high-explosive bomb hit Roehampton House, destroying much of the original interior including the painted salon and dining room. In 1961 the hospital became part of the NHS.

By 1982 the house was being used as nurses' accommodation; following a major refurbishment, completed in 1987, it went on to house offices and other services for the hospital. Queen Mary's Hospital moved to new premises in 2006 and in 2010 Berkeley Group Holdings began work to convert the property into 24 apartments and houses.

== Notable residents ==
- John Pearse, 1812, Governor of the Bank of England
