= Thomas Archer =

English Baroque architect

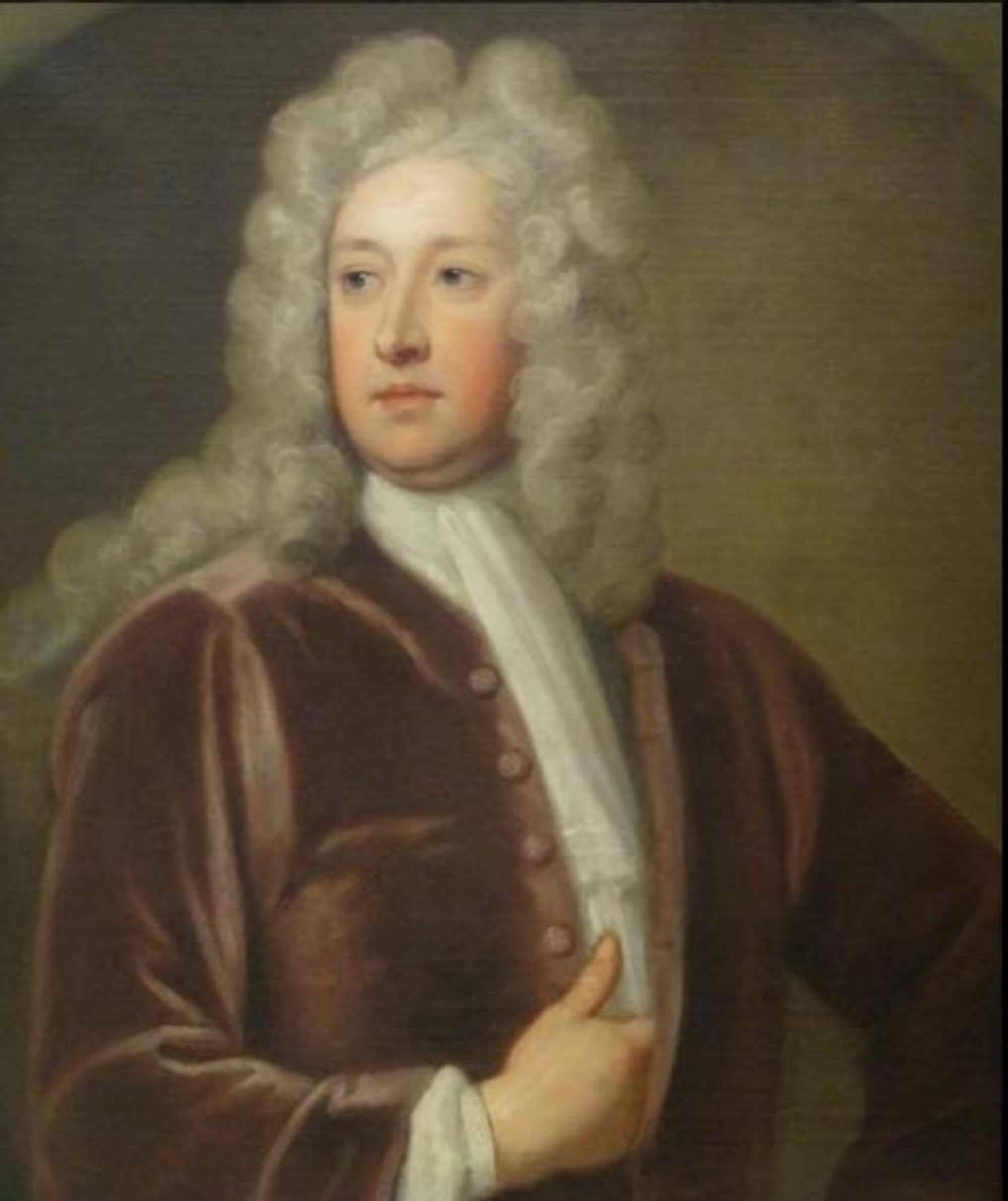
- Born: c. 1668
- Died: 23 May 1743
- Occupation: Architect
- Buildings: St. Paul's, Deptford St John's, Smith Square; St Philip's Cathedral; North Front & Cascade Chatsworth House; Heythrop Park Garden pavilion Wrest Park

Thomas Archer (1668–1743) was an English Baroque architect. His buildings are important as the only ones by an English Baroque architect to show evidence of study of contemporary continental, namely Italian, architecture. It is said that his work is somewhat overshadowed by that of his contemporaries, who include Sir John Vanbrugh and Nicholas Hawksmoor.

== Life ==
Archer spent his youth at Umberslade Hall in Tanworth-in-Arden in Warwickshire, the youngest son of Thomas Archer, a country gentleman, Parliamentary Colonel and Member of Parliament, and Ann Leigh, daughter of the London haberdasher, Richard Leigh. The exact date of Archer's birth is unknown, but can be inferred from the two documentary sources that mention his age. One is an entry in the Oxford University register recording his matriculation at Trinity College on 12 June 1686, aged 17; the other, his epitaph, survives in the parish church of Hale, Hampshire. If these records are accurate, he must have been born between 12 June 1668 and 22 May 1669. Thomas is the only one of the Archer children not to have his birth recorded in the Tamworth-in-Arden parish register, which suggests he may have been born elsewhere.

He attended Trinity College, Oxford, from which he matriculated on 12 June 1686. After leaving university, he went on a Grand Tour, spending four years abroad, including in Italy and his subsequent architectural work was influenced by Bernini and Borromini. His first wife Eleanor, who he married in 1701, died the following year and he later married Ann Chaplin, having no children from either of his marriages. Archer was appointed groom porter in 1705, a lucrative position that gave him the ability to license gambling premises and run his own tables when the gambling houses were closed, and William Cavendish, 1st Duke of Devonshire, commissioned him to work on Chatsworth House. Given Archer's status, his work is relatively rare, and it appears that he only designed when he desired to do so. Archer purchased the manor of Hale, and built Hale Park. Archer was appointed comptroller of Newcastle customs in 1715, after which his architectural work appears to have reduced. He died in London on 23 May 1743.

== Churches ==
Among Archer's churches is grade I listed St John Evangelist, Westminster, suggestive of Hawksmoor's baroque influence. When Archer asked Queen Anne how she wanted it to look, she apparently kicked over a stool and responded "like that!", with the resulting four towers resembling an upside down footstool, and the building subsequently nicknamed 'Queen Anne's Footstool'. Oscar Wilde once described the building as "some petrified monster, frightful and gigantic, on its back with its legs in the air”. The towers were influenced by Borromini’s Sant’Agnese. The building is considered one of the most important examples of English Baroque architecture. Designed and built between 1712 and 1730, grade I listed St Paul's, Deptford, sweeping semi-circular porticos were not copied for a century until Smirke's magnificent church at St Mary's, Bryanston Square that dominated the street. John Betjeman describes it as being "a pearl at the heart of Deptford", and it is influenced by two Italian churches, with Borromini’s work on Sant'Agnese inspiring the interior, and the work of Pietro da Cortona at Santa Maria della Pace. At St Philip's, Birmingham, now Birmingham Cathedral there was a strong sense of the Italianate Lombardic influences of High Baroque style of churches: ornate, high ceilings, with cupola and dome. External to St Philips is the roof balustrade quite unusual in English church architecture. St John's and St Paul's were both built for the Commission for Building Fifty New Churches. John Summerson said these two buildings "represent the most advanced Baroque style ever attempted in England". According to the minutes of the Commissioners, Archer also "improved" Hawksmoor's designs for St Alfege's at Greenwich, although the nature of the improvements, or whether they were implemented, is unknown.

At Hale, Hampshire, he remodelled St Mary's Church, which also contains his memorial, carved by Sir Henry Cheere to Archer's own design. (Note: Brian L. Harris seems to disagree with this assessment. He believes in Guide to Churches and Cathedrals the carving was done by Peter Scheemakers (1692–1786))

== Secular works ==
Archer's secular works included Roehampton House, Welford Park in Berkshire, and the Cascade House and the west front and broadly bowed pilastered north front at Chatsworth House. In 1709–11 Archer designed a Baroque garden pavilion for Henry Grey, 1st Duke of Kent at Wrest Park, Silsoe, Bedfordshire. After 1712 Archer designed Hurstbourne Priors in Hampshire for John Wallop (later Earl of Portsmouth).

He was a founding governor of the Foundling Hospital in London in 1739, but was not involved in the construction of the resulting building, completed c. 1750. The architect for that project was Theodore Jacobsen.

== Documented works ==
- Chatsworth House, North front, Derbyshire, c. 1705
- Heythrop Hall, Oxfordshire, c. 1705
- St Philip's, Birmingham, 1708–1715
- Garden pavilion, Wrest Park, Bedfordshire, 1709–1711
- Roehampton House, Surrey, 1712
- Cliveden House, Service pavilions and the quadrant colonnades, Buckinghamshire
- Hurstbourne Priors, Hampshire, 1712
- St John’s, Smith Square, London, 1713–1728
- St. Paul's, Deptford, 1712–1730
- Hale Park, Hampshire, 1715, designed for himself.
- St Mary’s Church, additions, Hale, Hampshire, 1717
- Harcourt House, Cavendish Square, London, 1722

== Attributed works ==
- Welford Park, remodelling of house, Berkshire, 1700
- Chicheley Hall, Buckinghamshire, c. 1703
- Parish church, chancel, Chicheley, 1708
- Addiscombe House, Croydon, Surrey, c. 1703
- Monmouth House, Soho Square, London, 1703
- Russell House, King Street, Covent Garden, London, c. 1704
- Cascade House, Chatsworth House, Derbyshire, 1705
- Hill House, Cain Hill, Wrest Park, Bedfordshire, c. 1710, demolished
- Bramham Park, Yorkshire, c. 1710
- Kingston Maurward, Dorset, 1717–1720
- Marlow Place, Buckinghamshire, 1720
- Chettle House, Dorset, c. 1730
- Monument to Susannah Thomas, Hampton Church, Middlesex, c. 1731
- Archer Memorial, St Mary’s Church, Hale, Hampshire
- Thomas Archer (his father) monument, St Mary Magdalene's Church, Tanworth-in-Arden, Warwickshire

== Gallery ==
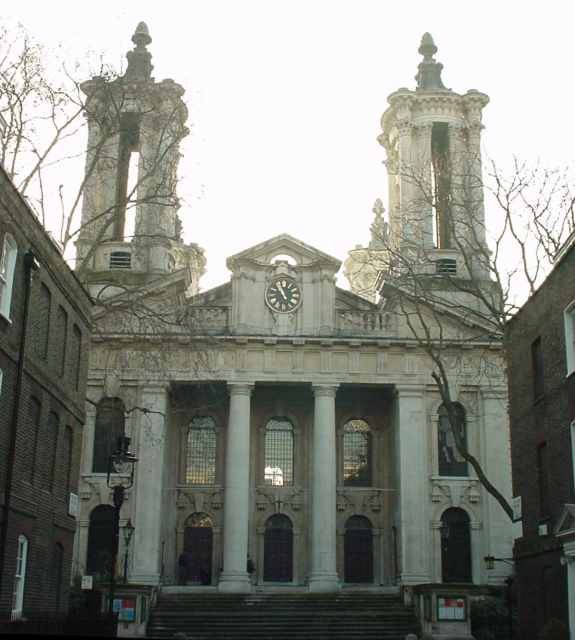
St. John's, Smith Square

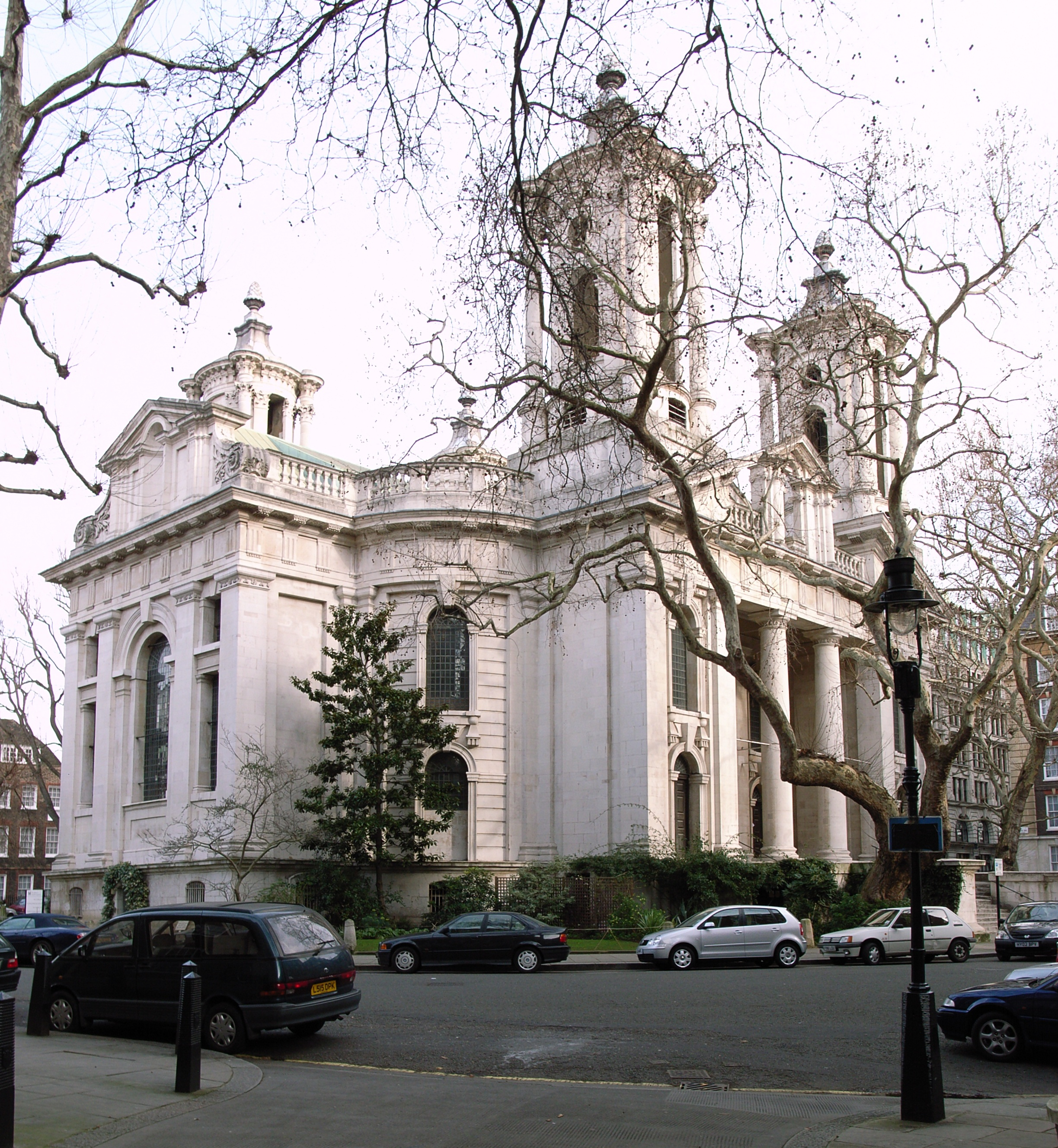
St. John's, Smith Square

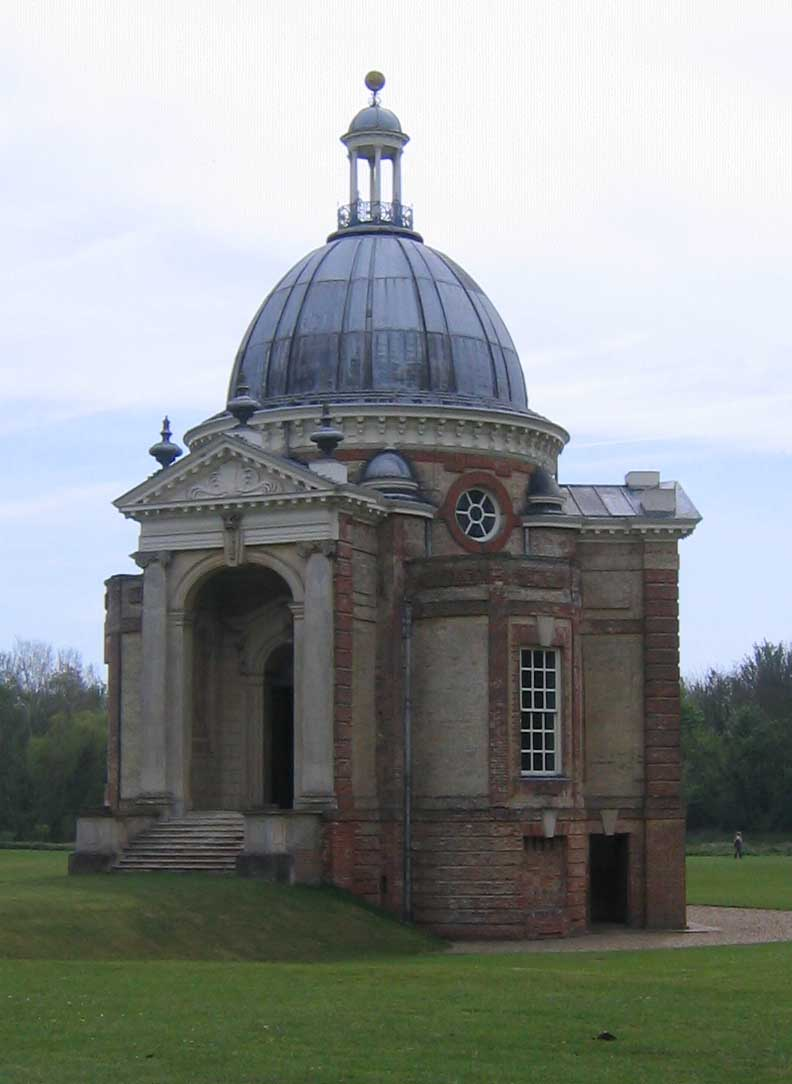
Thomas Archer's garden pavilion at Wrest Park, 2007

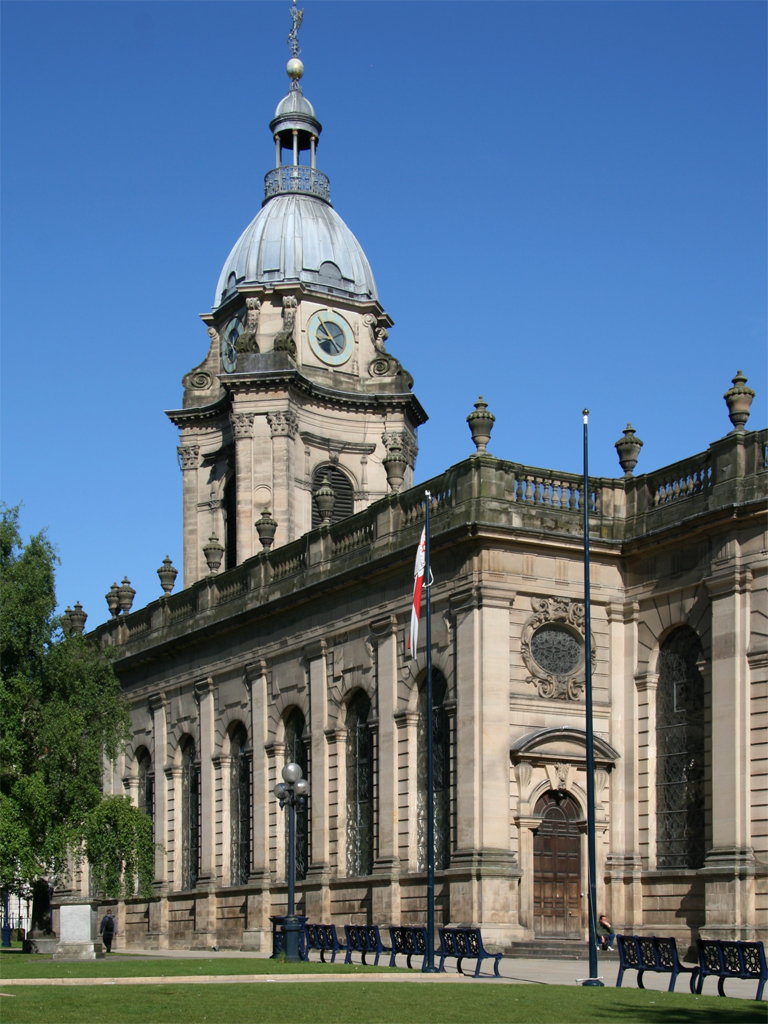
St. Philip's Cathedral, Birmingham

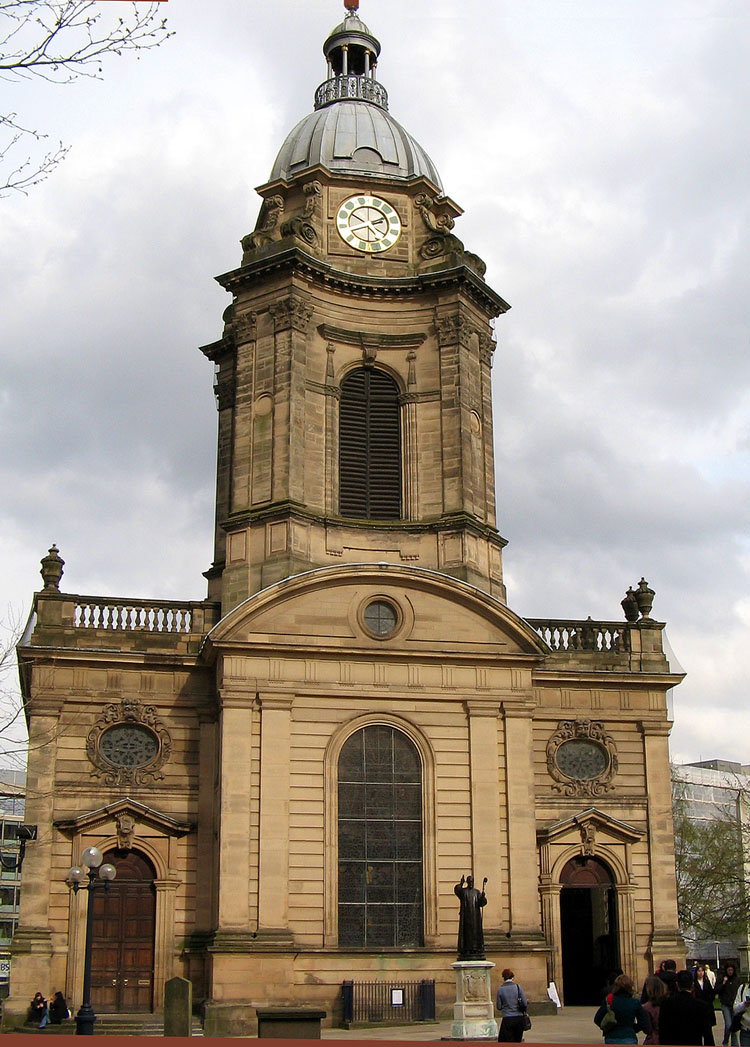
St. Philip's Cathedral, Birmingham, west front

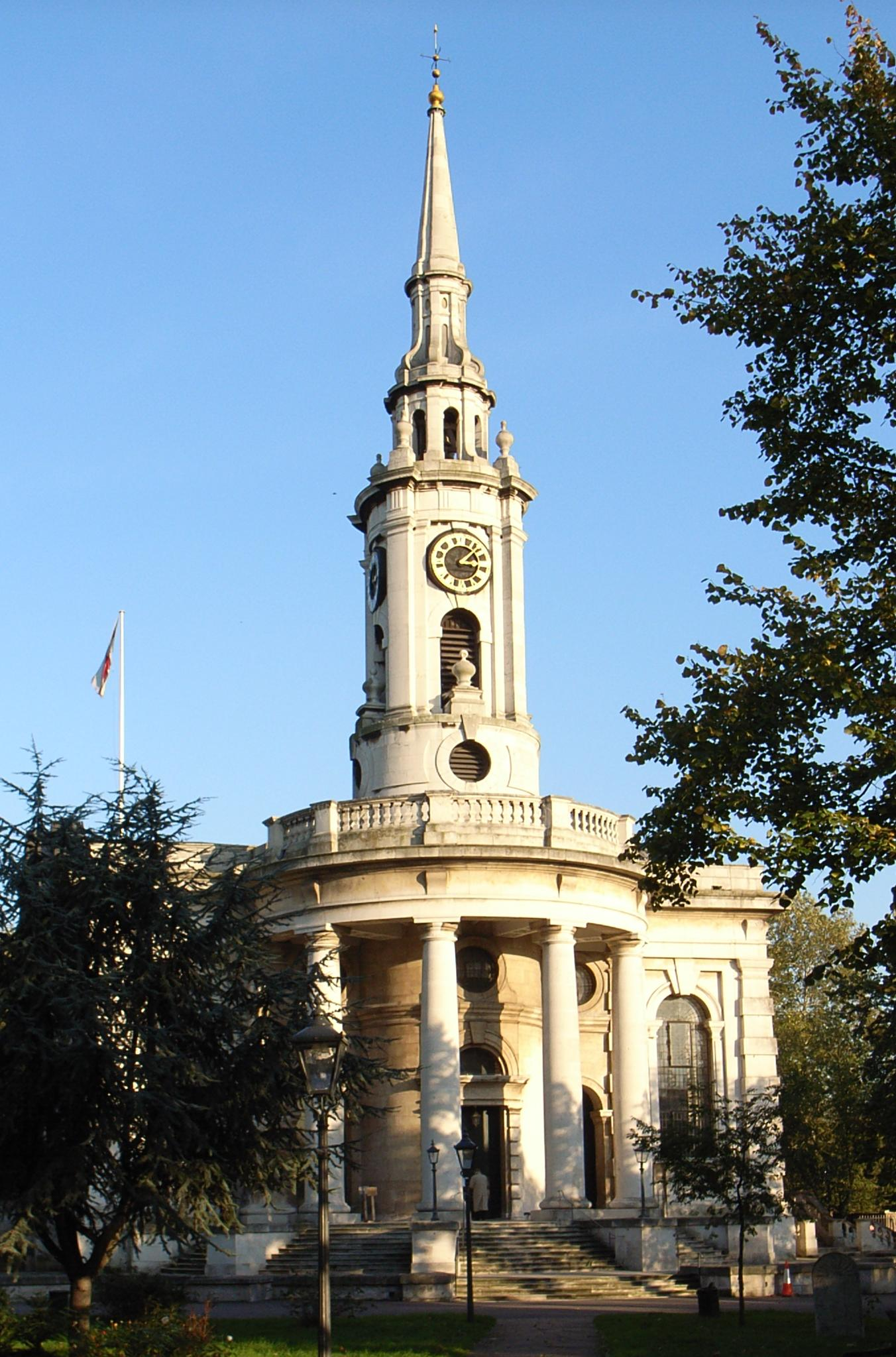
St Paul's Deptford

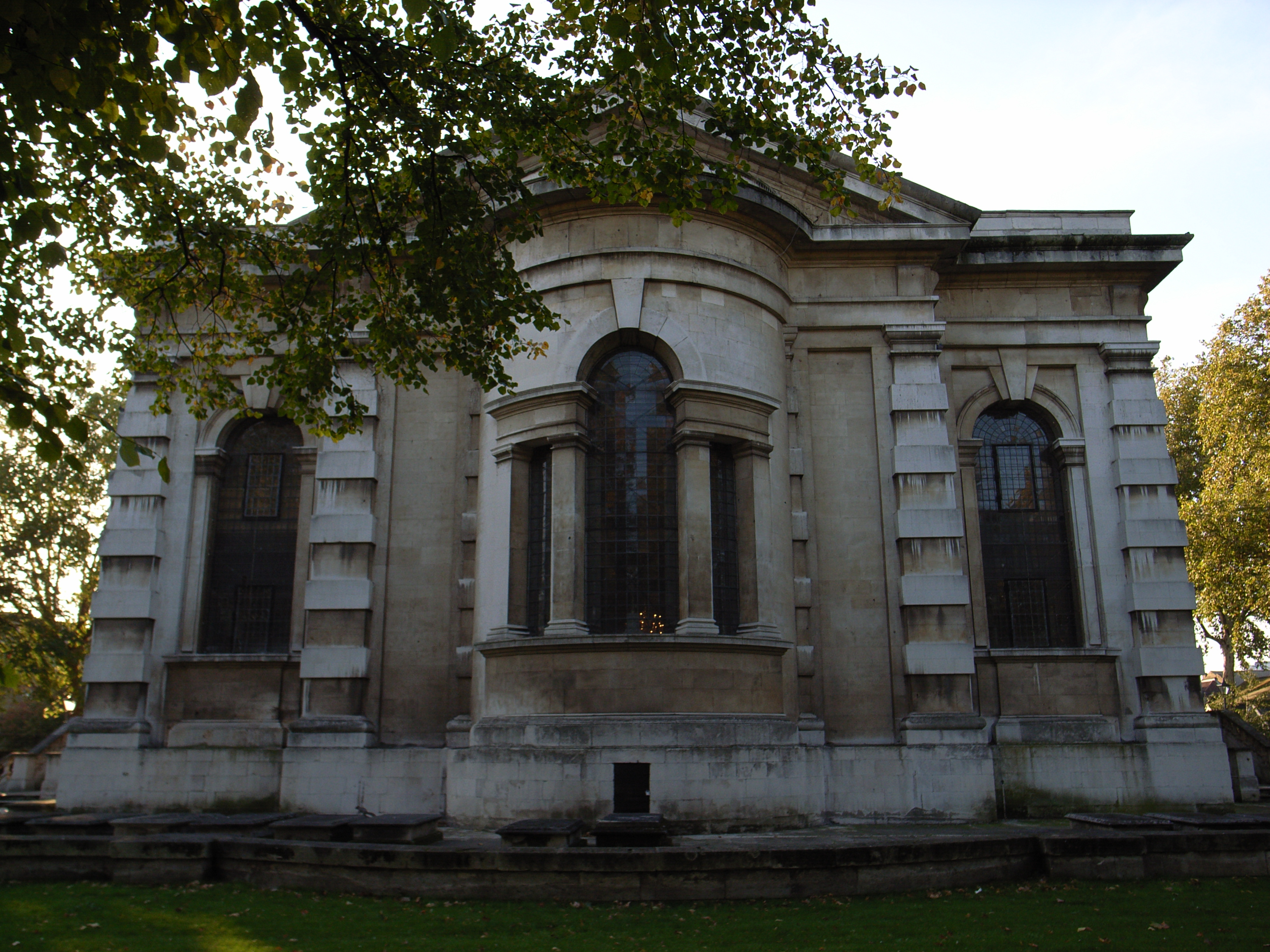
St Paul's Deptford, east side

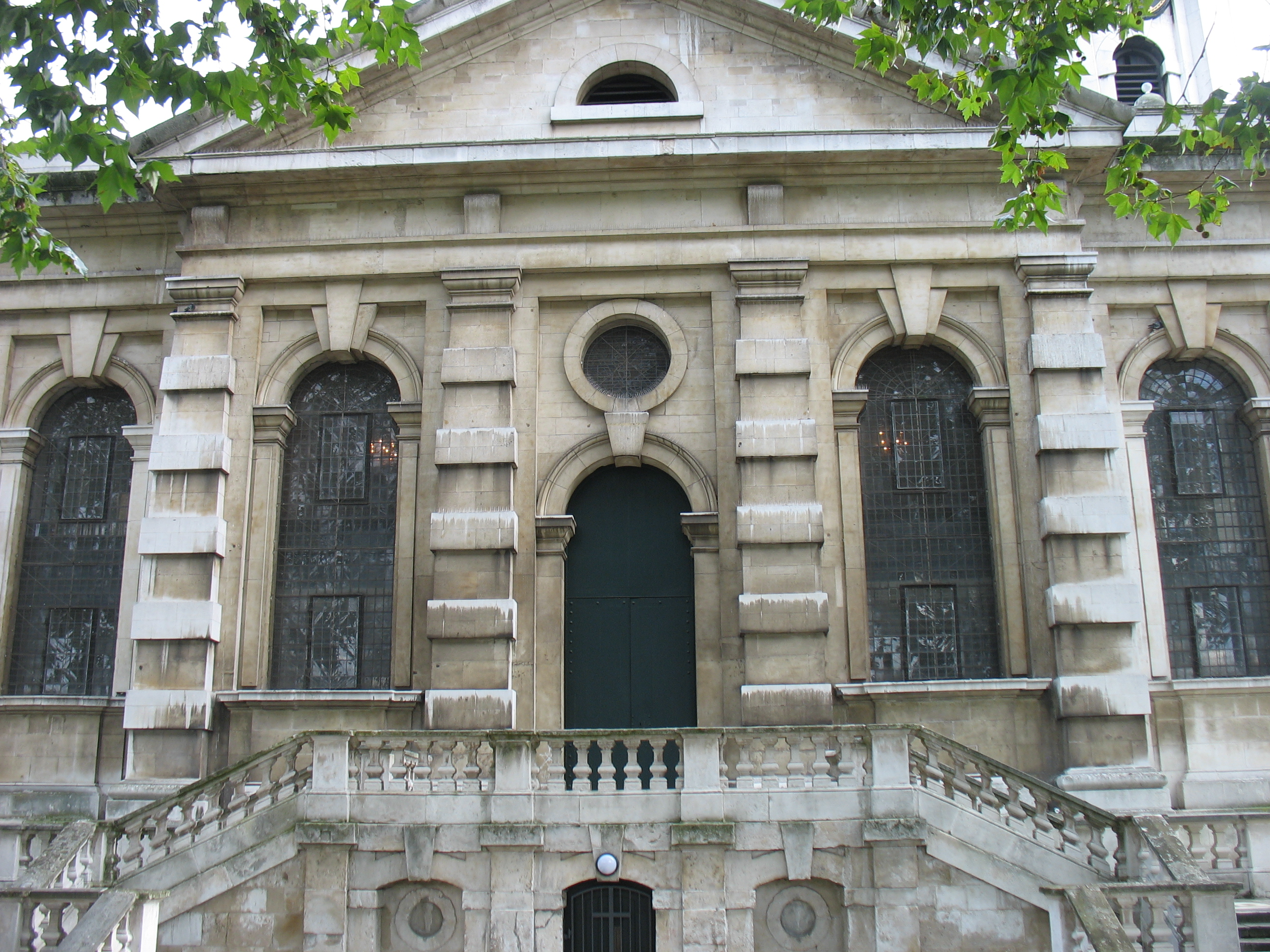
St Paul's Deptford, north side

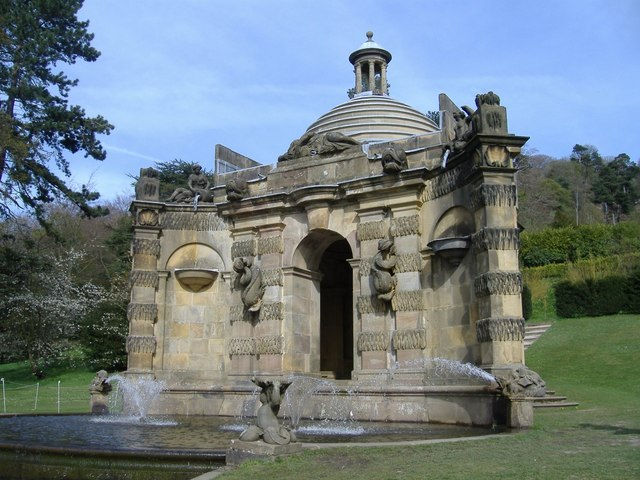
Cascade House Chatsworth

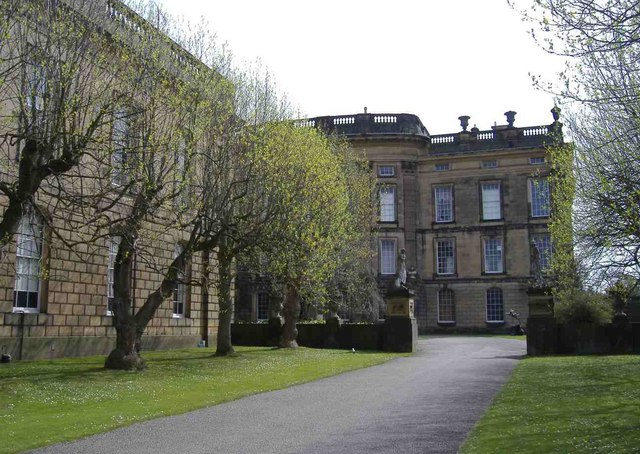
Chatsworth North Front

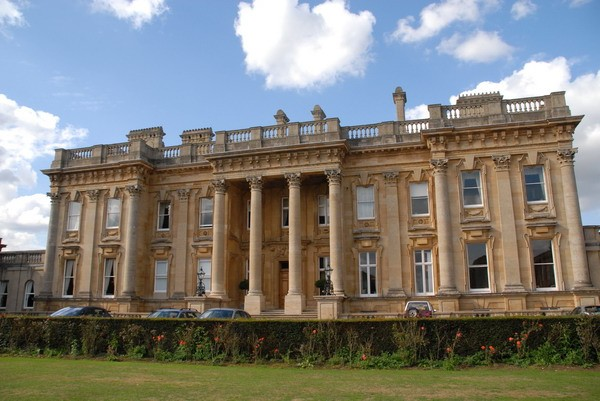
Heythrop Hall

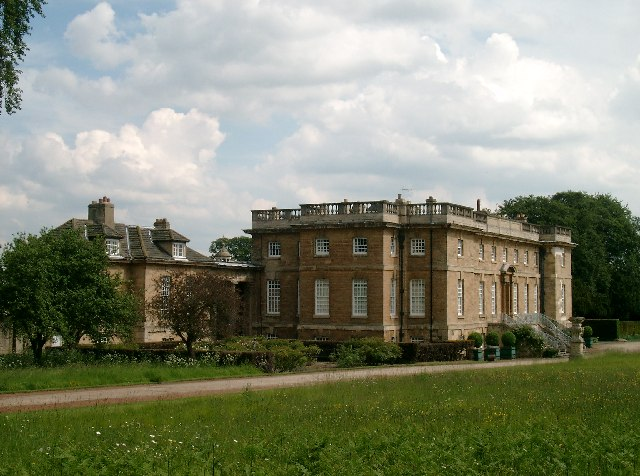
Bramham Park

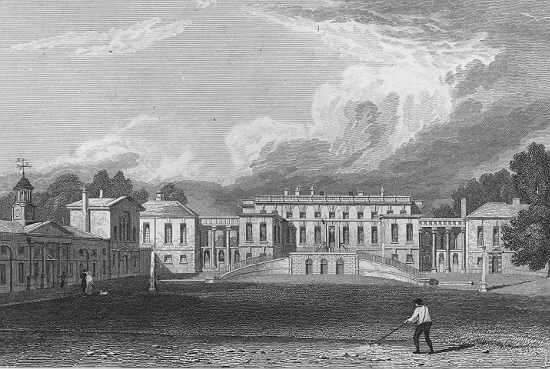
Bramham Park

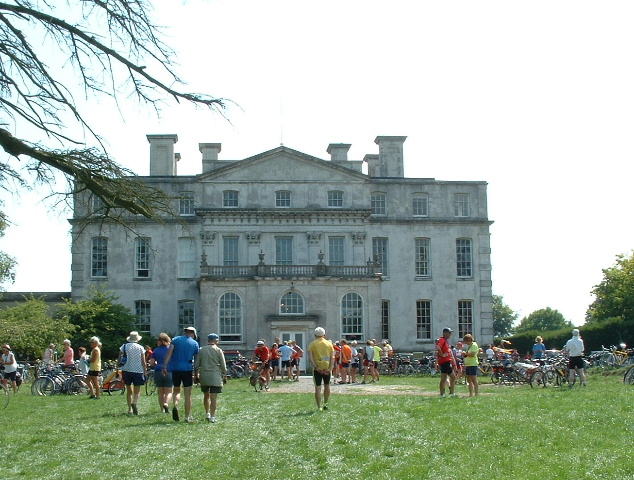
Kingston Maurward House

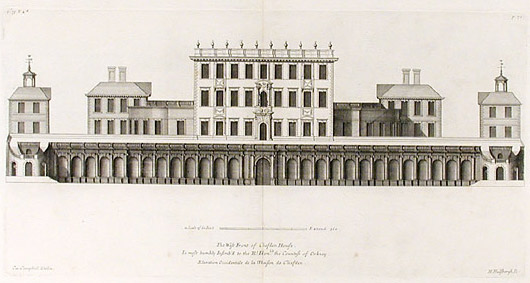
Cliveden House

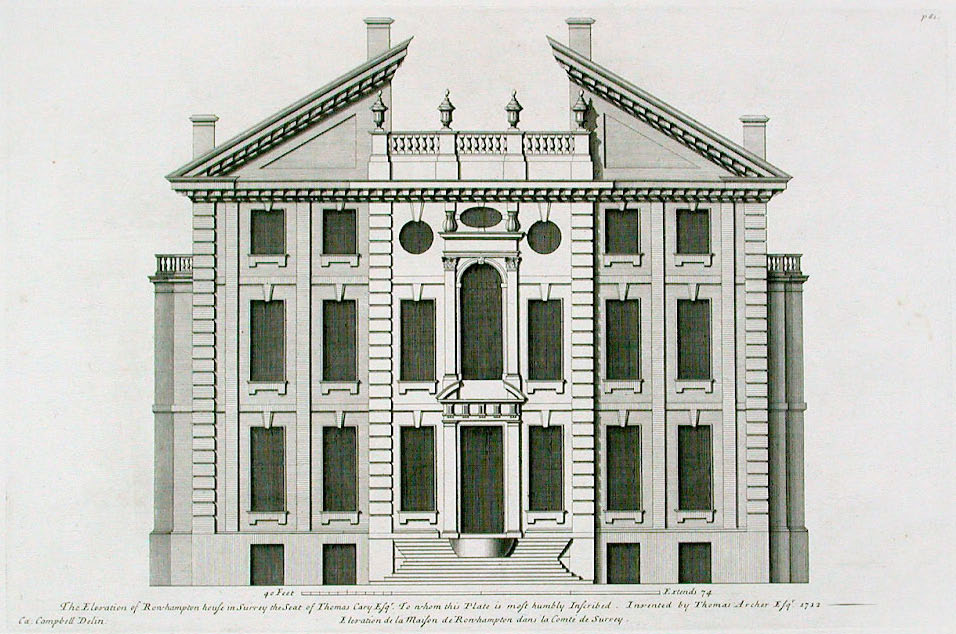
Roehampton House

== Notes ==
Court offices
Preceded by William Rowley	Groom Porter; 1705–1743	Succeeded by Charles FitzRoy
