= English Baroque architecture =

Style of architecture

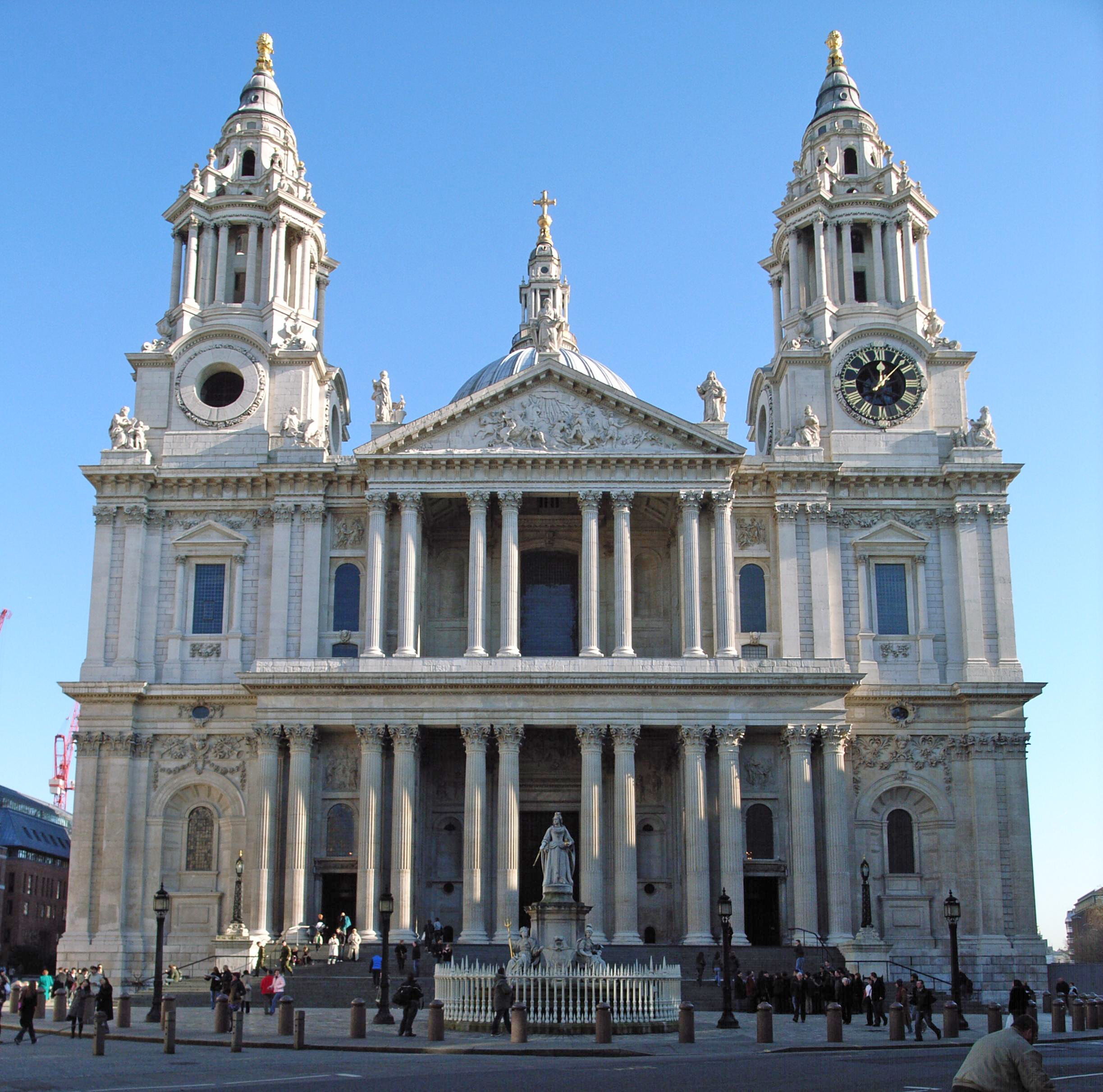
St Paul's Cathedral by Sir Christopher Wren, 1674–1711

English Baroque is a term used to refer to modes of English architecture that paralleled Baroque architecture in continental Europe between the Great Fire of London (1666) and roughly 1720, when the flamboyant and dramatic qualities of Baroque art were abandoned in favour of the more chaste rule-based Neo-classical forms espoused by the proponents of Palladianism.

It is primarily embodied in the works of Christopher Wren, Nicholas Hawksmoor, John Vanbrugh, and James Gibbs, although a handful of lesser architects such as Thomas Archer also produced buildings of significance. In domestic architecture and interior decor, Baroque qualities can sometimes be seen in the late phase of the Restoration style, and the William and Mary style, the Queen Anne style, and early Georgian architecture are varieties of Baroque.

== Development ==
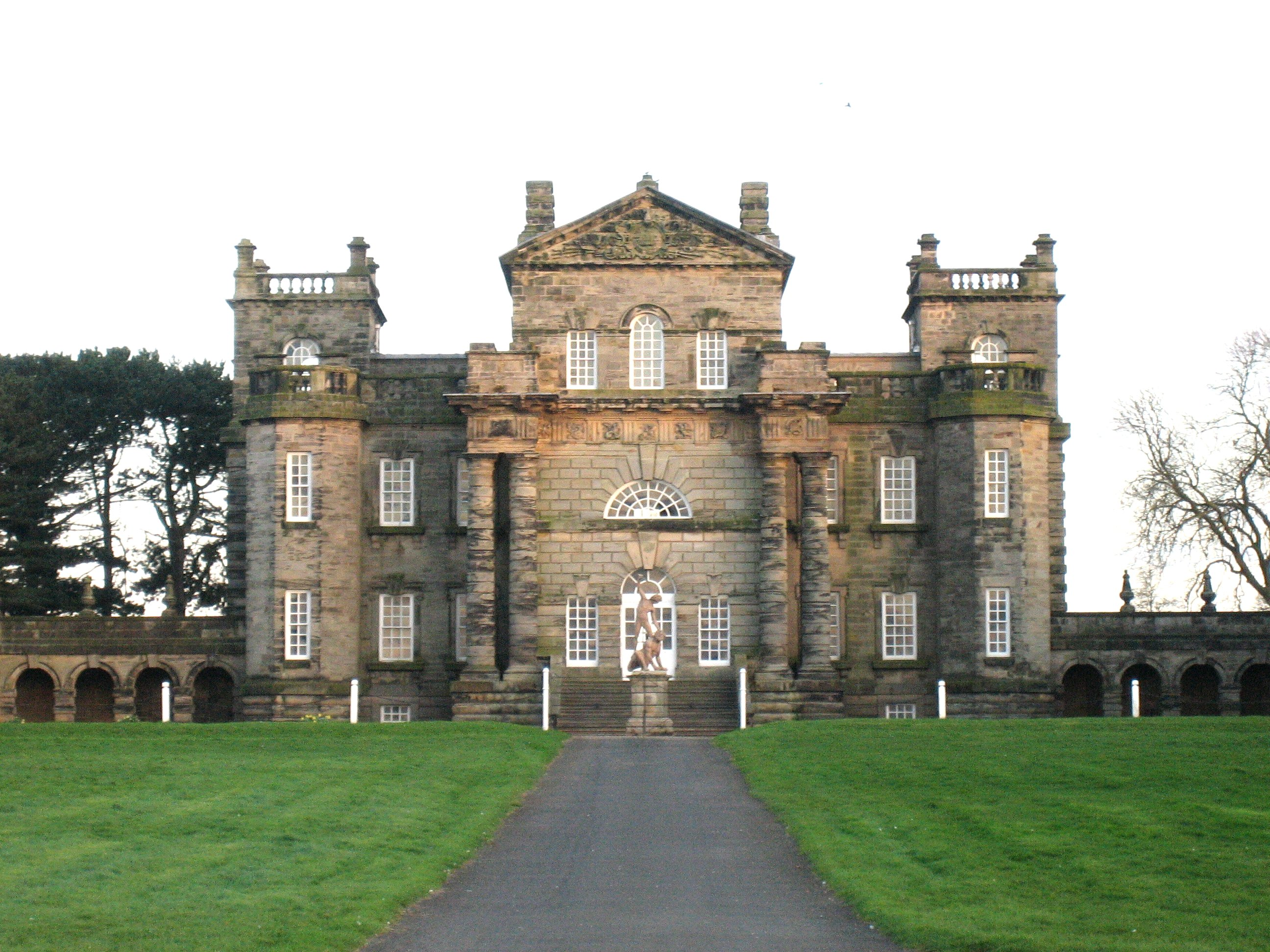
Seaton Delaval Hall by Sir John Vanbrugh, 1718.

Sir Christopher Wren presided over the genesis of the English Baroque manner, which differed from the continental models by clarity of design, a less restless taste in carving and embellishment and a greater concern for historic precedent in classicism. Following the Great Fire of London, Wren rebuilt fifty-three churches, where Baroque aesthetics are apparent primarily in dynamic structure and multiple changing views. His most ambitious work was St Paul's Cathedral (1675–1711), which bears comparison with the most effulgent domed churches of Italy and France. In this majestic edifice, the Palladian tradition of Inigo Jones is fused with contemporary baroque sensibility in masterly equilibrium. Less influential were straightforward attempts to graft the Berniniesque vision onto British church architecture (e.g., by Thomas Archer in St. John's, Smith Square, (1728) and St Paul's, Deptford.)

The first fully Baroque English country house was built to a design by William Talman at Chatsworth, commenced in 1687. The culmination of Baroque architectural forms comes with Sir John Vanbrugh and Nicholas Hawksmoor. Each achieved a fully developed and highly individual architectural expression, and they were known to work alongside each other, including at Castle Howard (1699), the Orangery at Kensington Palace and Blenheim Palace (1705). Appuldurcombe House, Isle of Wight, now in ruins, but conserved by English Heritage, is another example.

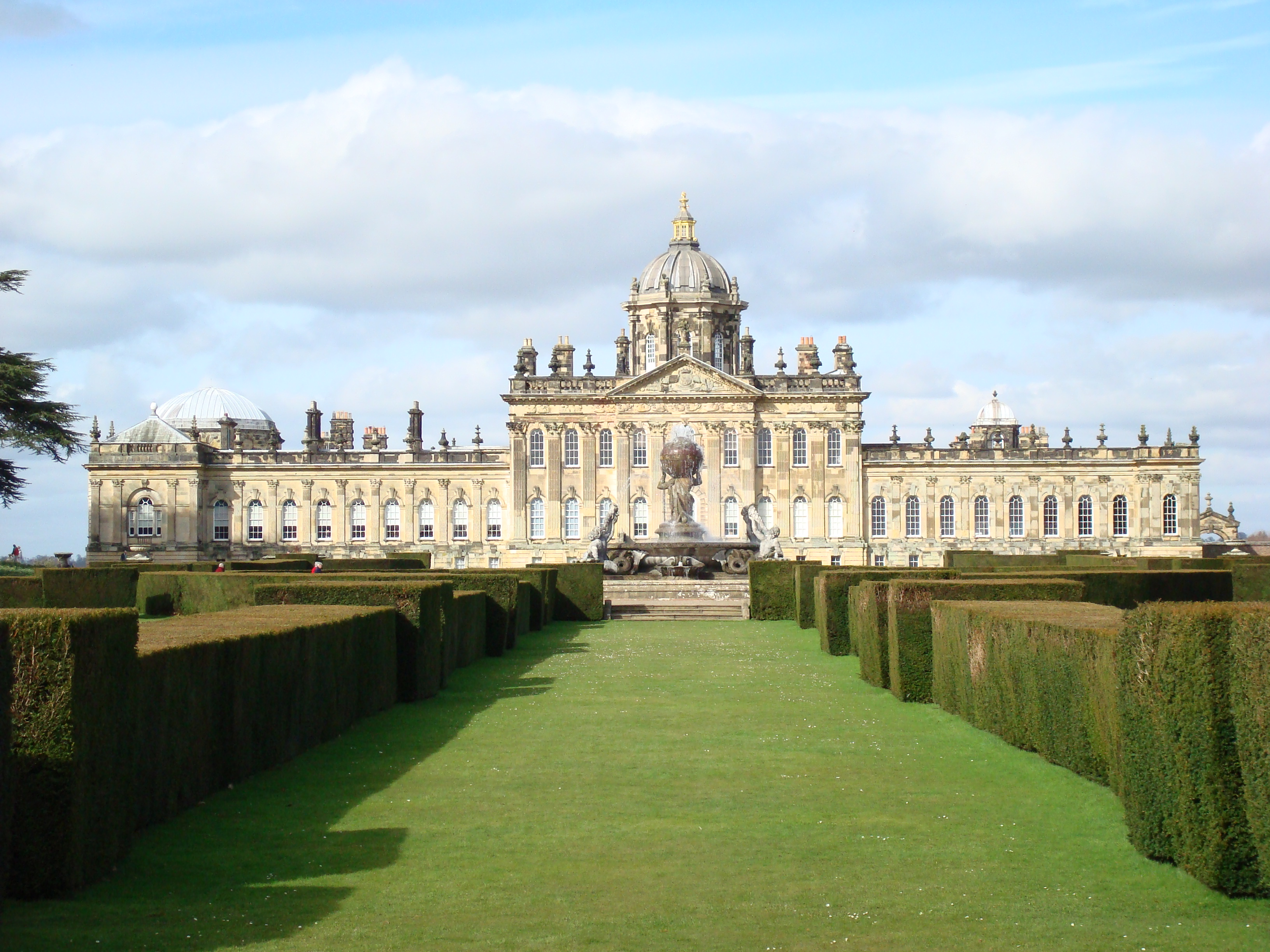
Castle Howard by Vanbrugh and Nicholas Hawksmoor, 1701.

Castle Howard is a flamboyant assembly of restless masses dominated by a cylindrical domed tower. Blenheim Palace is the largest secular monument of English Baroque architecture, where windows, gateways, porticos and colonnades are richly combined. Vanbrugh's final work was Seaton Delaval Hall (1718), a mansion of more modest scale yet remarkable for the audacity of its style. It was at Seaton Delaval that Vanbrugh, a skillful playwright, achieved the peak of Restoration drama, once again highlighting a parallel between Baroque architecture and contemporary theatre. Despite his efforts, Baroque was never truly to the English taste and well before his death in 1724 the style had lost currency in Britain.

== Displacement by Palladian Revival ==
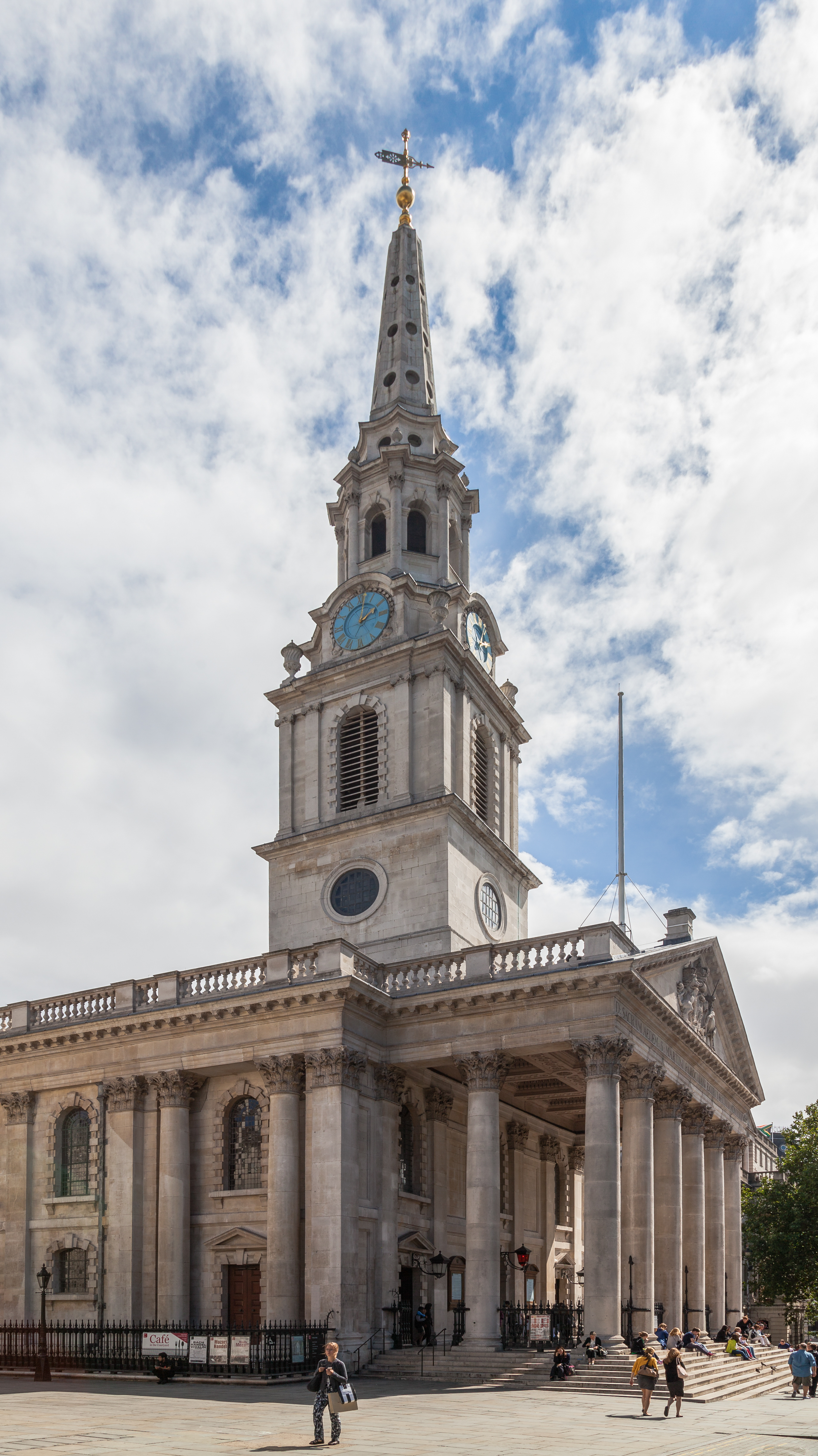
James Gibbs' St Martin-in-the-Fields, London, is the prototype of many New England churches.

In the late 17th and early 18th century, the English Baroque style was often associated with Toryism and Continental Europe by the increasingly dominant Whig aristocracy.

The contemporary mood soon shifted toward the more sober stripped-back orthodoxy of British Palladianism popularised in the second and third volumes of Colen Campbell's influential and widely circulated Vitruvius Britannicus. (Campbell's first volume, by contrast, had embraced the Baroque). Baroque aesthetics, whose influence was so potent in mid-17th century France, made little impact in England during the Protectorate and the first Restoration years.

A remarkable testimony to the rapid change in taste is found at Wentworth Woodhouse, where Thomas Watson-Wentworth and his son Thomas Watson-Wentworth, 1st Marquess of Rockingham replaced a Jacobean house with a substantial Baroque one in the 1720s, only to find fellow Whigs unimpressed. As a result, an immensely long, fully Palladian, range was added in parallel, leaving the older house intact but hidden by the newer addition from the landscape park.
