= South Charford =

Hamlet in Hampshire, England

Coordinates: 50.971°N 1.762°W

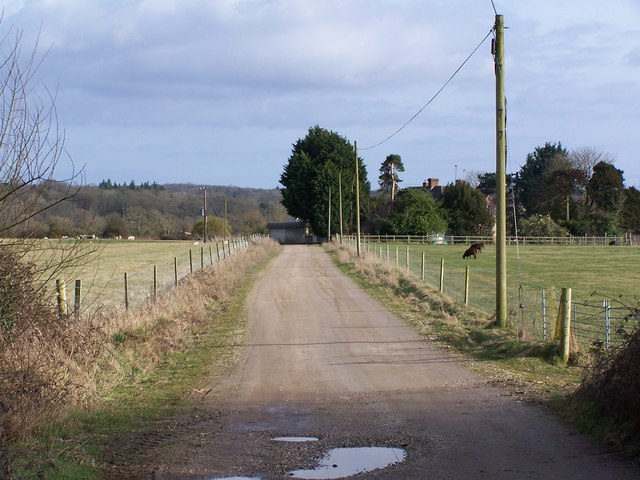
- Track to South Charford Farm

- Location within Hampshire
- OS grid reference: SU168191
- Civil parish: Breamore
- District: New Forest
- Shire county: Hampshire
- Region: South East
- Country: England
- Sovereign state: United Kingdom
- Post town: FORDINGBRIDGE
- Postcode district: SP6
- Dialling code: 01725
- Police: Hampshire and Isle of Wight
- Fire: Hampshire and Isle of Wight
- Ambulance: South Central
- UK Parliament: New Forest West

South Charford is a hamlet in the civil parish of Breamore, in the New Forest district, in Hampshire, England. It is on the west bank of the River Avon.

== History ==
South and North Charford are usually identified with the "Cerdic's ford" which appears twice in the Anglo-Saxon Chronicle. It first is mentioned under the entry for the year 508 when we are told that following a battle to the east "the land as far as Cerdic's ford was named Natanleaga" For the year 519 we are told that "Cerdic and Cynric succeeded to the kingdom [of the West Saxons]; and in the same year they fought against the Britons at a place called Cerdic's ford". If a battle really did take place here then it is possible that the boundary of Hampshire was first established here.

In the time of the Domesday Book of 1086, South Charford (Cerdeford) was a fairly large settlement of around 24 households. The manor was held of Hugh de Port by William de Chernet, and it remained in the Chernet family for over 200 years. In 1293 Iseult de Chernet was dealing with the manor, which passed by inheritance or purchase to Oliver de la Zouche. Sometime before 1428 it was evidently sold it to Sir John Popham, who served in France under Henry V and the Duke of Bedford. It then came into the possession of the Bulkeley family and followed the descent of Burgate in Fordingbridge until 1600, when John Bulkeley conveyed it to Hugh Grove. Sir William Dodington was holding it in 1624. His son Herbert died childless in 1633, and his father, who survived, held the manor until his death in 1638, when it passed to his younger son John. South Charford passed by sale or settlement to Fulke Greville, 5th Baron Brooke, and remained in his family until 1747–8, when Francis Greville, 8th Baron Brooke sold his Hampshire estates. South Charford passed to Henry Archer and then followed the descent of North Charford.

A chapel is said to have been built by Sir John Popham with the consent of the Prior of Breamore, and was dedicated in 1404. The chapel was in ruins by the mid 18th-century when Thomas Archer made use of the material for enlarging and rebuilding of the church of Hale. The site is in a field near South Charford Farm, and is now occupied by a large yew tree.

South Charford was long a separate parish, although for a period in the early 19th-century it was reckoned as a tithing of the parish of North Charford. The population of South Charford in 1870 was 70 people living in 13 houses. In 1931 the parish had a population of 89. On 1 April 1932 the parish was abolished and merged with Breamore and Hale. There is no village today — just a few farm buildings.
