= Woodgreen =

Village and parish in Hampshire, England

Coordinates: 50.95724°N 1.75918°W

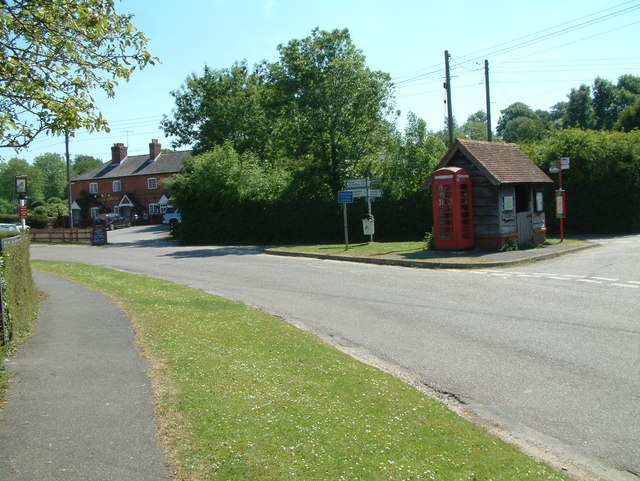
- The village centre

- Location within Hampshire
- Population: 537 (2001 Census); 489 (2011 Census)
- OS grid reference: SU170175
- Civil parish: Woodgreen
- District: New Forest
- Shire county: Hampshire
- Region: South East
- Country: England
- Sovereign state: United Kingdom
- Post town: FORDINGBRIDGE
- Postcode district: SP6
- Police: Hampshire and Isle of Wight
- Fire: Hampshire and Isle of Wight
- Ambulance: South Central
- UK Parliament: New Forest West

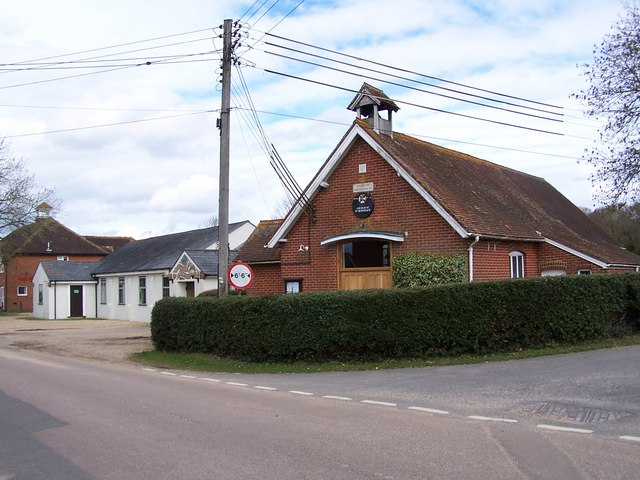
Village hall and church

Woodgreen is a village and civil parish within the New Forest district of Hampshire in England.

== Overview ==
Woodgreen lies between Breamore and Hale to the east of the River Avon. It is located due south of the city of Salisbury, its nearest town is Fordingbridge lying to the southwest. In the 2001 UK Census the parish was home to 537 people in 220 households. Its nearest railway station is Dean railway station.

The village has one pub called The Horse and Groom. In 2006 the village shop and post office was threatened with closure, but the village pulled together and acquired the lease for five years. On 14 May 2011 a new Woodgreen Community Shop was opened after more than four years of campaigning and fundraising by the local community.

Two thirds of the parish is an area of woodland, heathland, acid grassland, scrub and valley bog, supporting a richness and diversity of wildlife.

One mile to the south of the village are the earthwork remains of Castle Hill, comprising an oval ring motte with an outer bailey. The castle may have been a siege castle recorded in 1148.

== History ==
Woodgreen was originally an extra-parochial area of the New Forest, reckoned as part of Godshill tithing. The settlement has been known as Woodgreen since the mid 17th century. The "Wood" is Godshill Inclosure which separates the village from the rest of the New Forest; "Green" is a common name in southern England for a secondary settlement. The civil parish of Woodgreen consisting of just 47 acres was created in 1858. In 1932 the parish was much enlarged with the addition of 166 acres from Breamore parish and 175 acres from Hale parish.

When the village hall was built in 1930–1, two students from the Royal College of Art (Robert Baker and Edward Payne) were commissioned by the Carnegie Trust to decorate the walls entirely with murals, depicting village life as it was then. The mural shows poachers looking down from Castle Hill; the Sunday School in the Methodist Church; folk dancing; fruit picking; the Horse and Groom; the village flower show; making cider; and the caretaker lighting the stove.

The building that is now the village church dates from 1913 and was originally a church reading room. In 1949, it was dedicated as a church with the name of Saint Boniface and was extended to its present size in 1963. Since 1927, Woodgreen has been part of the ecclesiastical parish of Hale and Woodgreen, sharing the same clergy and with shared services.

== Governance ==
Woodgreen parish council has seven members. The parish forms part of the Downlands and Forest Ward which is represented on the New Forest District Council by a single seat, currently occupied by Edward Heron of the Conservative Party. Woodgreen is within the New Forest West parliamentary constituency, represented by another Conservative, Desmond Swayne.
