= St Paul's, Deptford =

Coordinates: 51°28′46.50″N 0°1′28″W

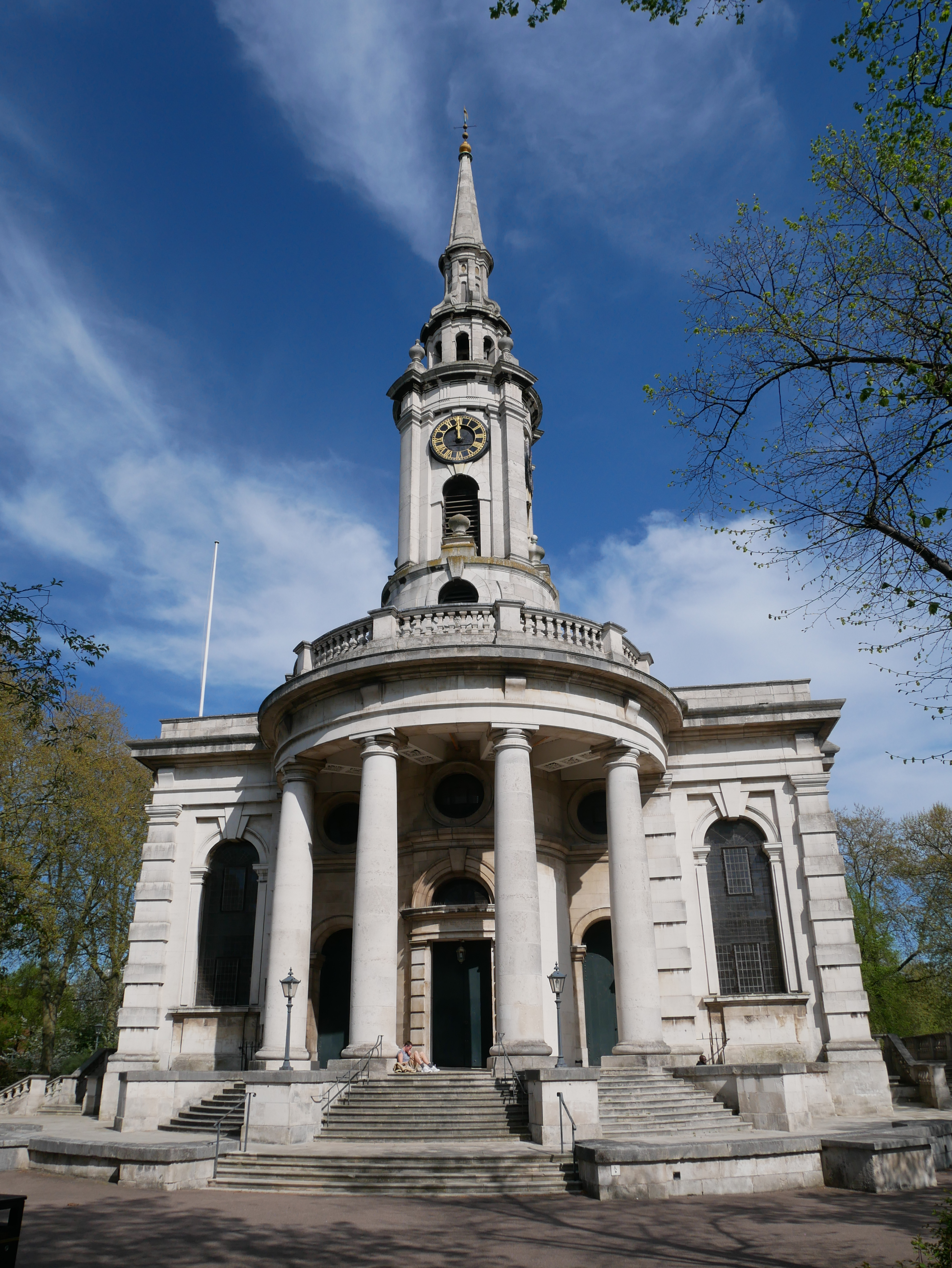
- The west face of the Church of Saint Paul, Deptford
- St Paul's, Deptford
- OS grid reference: TQ 37286 77480
- Location: Deptford, London
- Country: England
- Denomination: Church of England
- Churchmanship: Anglo-Catholic

Architecture
- Heritage designation: Grade I
- Architect: Thomas Archer
- Years built: 1712–1730

Administration
- Diocese: Diocese of Southwark

Clergy
- Rector: Fr Paul Butler

St Paul's, Deptford, is one of London's finest Baroque parish churches, cited as "one of the most moving C18 churches in London" in the Buildings of England series. It was designed by gentleman architect Thomas Archer and built between 1712 and 1730 in Deptford, which was then a settlement in Kent but is now part of South East London. It was one of the 50 churches that were to be built by the New Church Commissioners, although only 12 were ultimately constructed. With St John's, Smith Square, it was one of two churches designed by Archer to be built under the Act.

== History ==
=== Construction ===
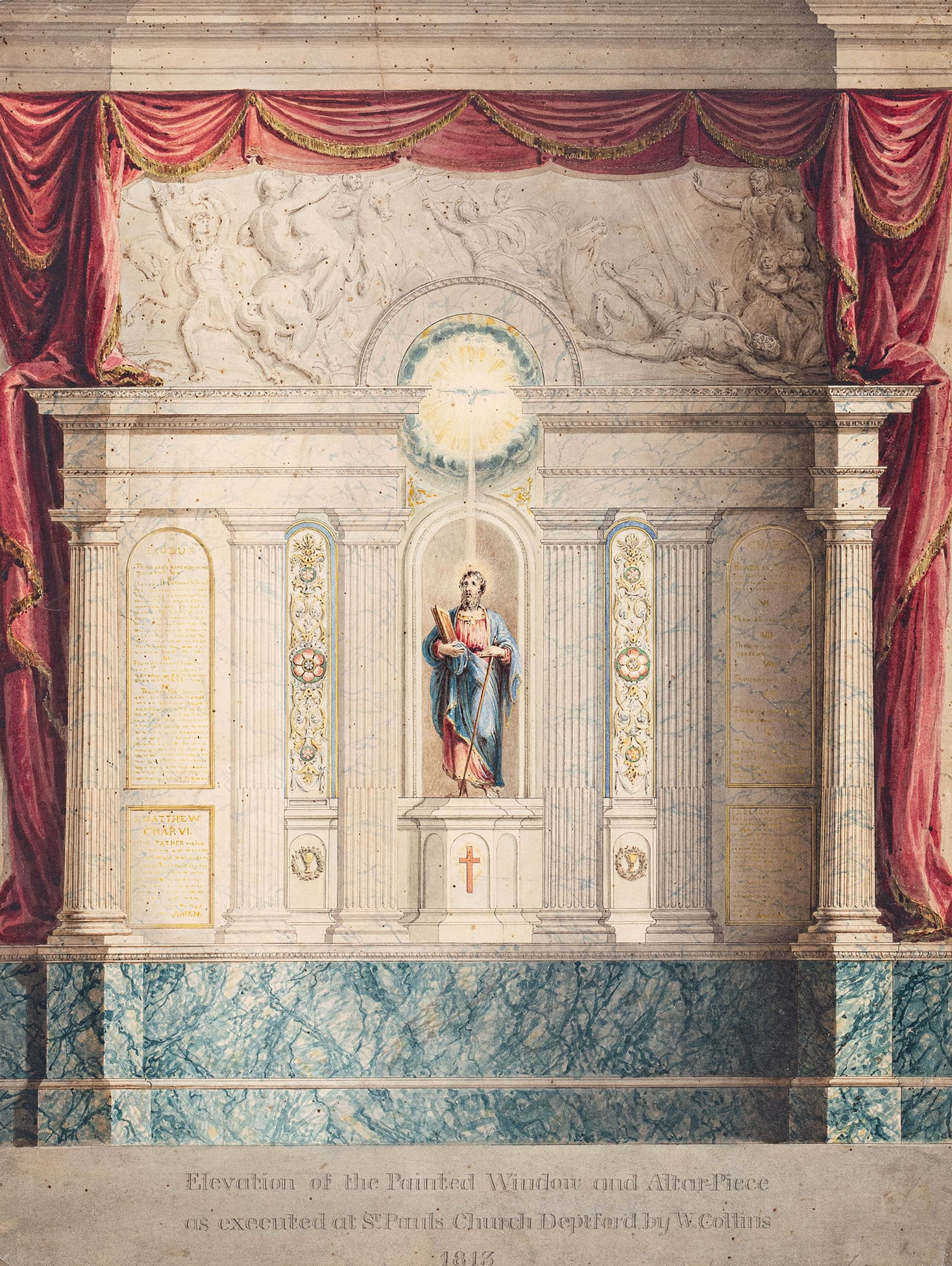
Ink and watercolour drawing inscribed "Elevation of the Painted Window and Altar Piece / as executed at St Paul's Church Deptford by William Collins, 1813"

With rising urban growth in Deptford (mainly made up of literate, skilled workers tending to dissent from the established church), the Commission for Building Fifty New Churches decided to counter this drift away from the established Anglican communion by building a major new Church of England church in the area. To this end they appointed Thomas Archer, one of their fellow commissioners, to design a church in Deptford. Archer also designed St John's Smith Square and Birmingham Cathedral. He began almost immediately, designing it in his usual Roman Baroque style and completing the fabric and most of the decoration by 1720 (though work continued until its consecration in 1730). The church was built by Edward Strong the Younger a friend of Christopher Wren the Younger.

The Rectory also designed by Archer, was demolished, ca 1886.

=== Twentieth century ===
In the 1970s a basement room at the church, known as 'The Crypt', was used as a reggae club. By the mid-1980s it was a regular venue for all-night psychedelic rock revival concerts and club nights. Colin Jerwood of the anarcho-punk band Conflict would also put on gigs there.

In May 2000 the church was damaged by a fire. The structural damage was confined to the east end, where much of the stained glass was lost and the joinery and decorative finishes were badly charred. The whole of the interior, including the organ case, was blackened by smoke.

== Architecture and Features ==
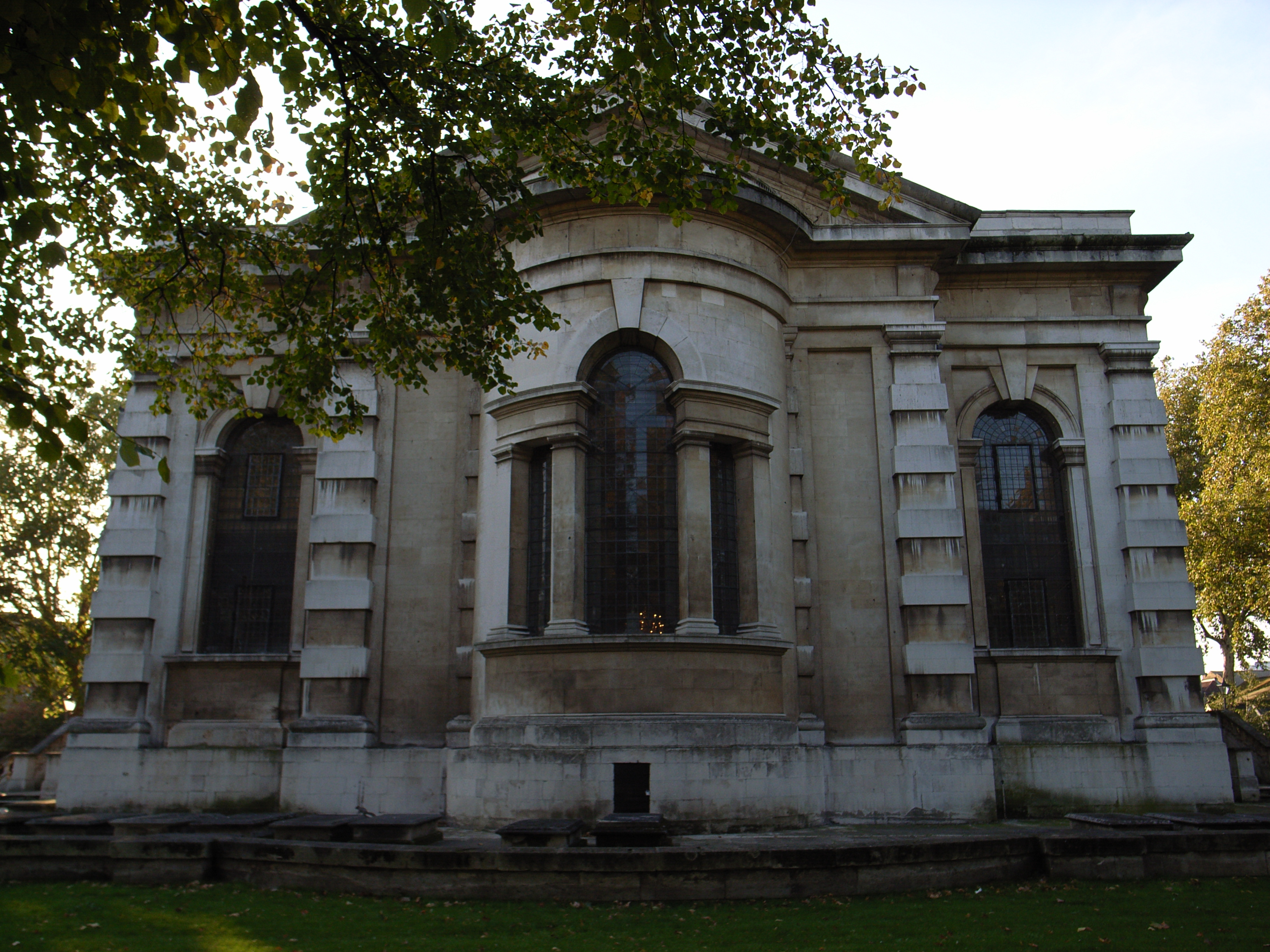
Exterior of the apse with its unconventional convex Venetian window

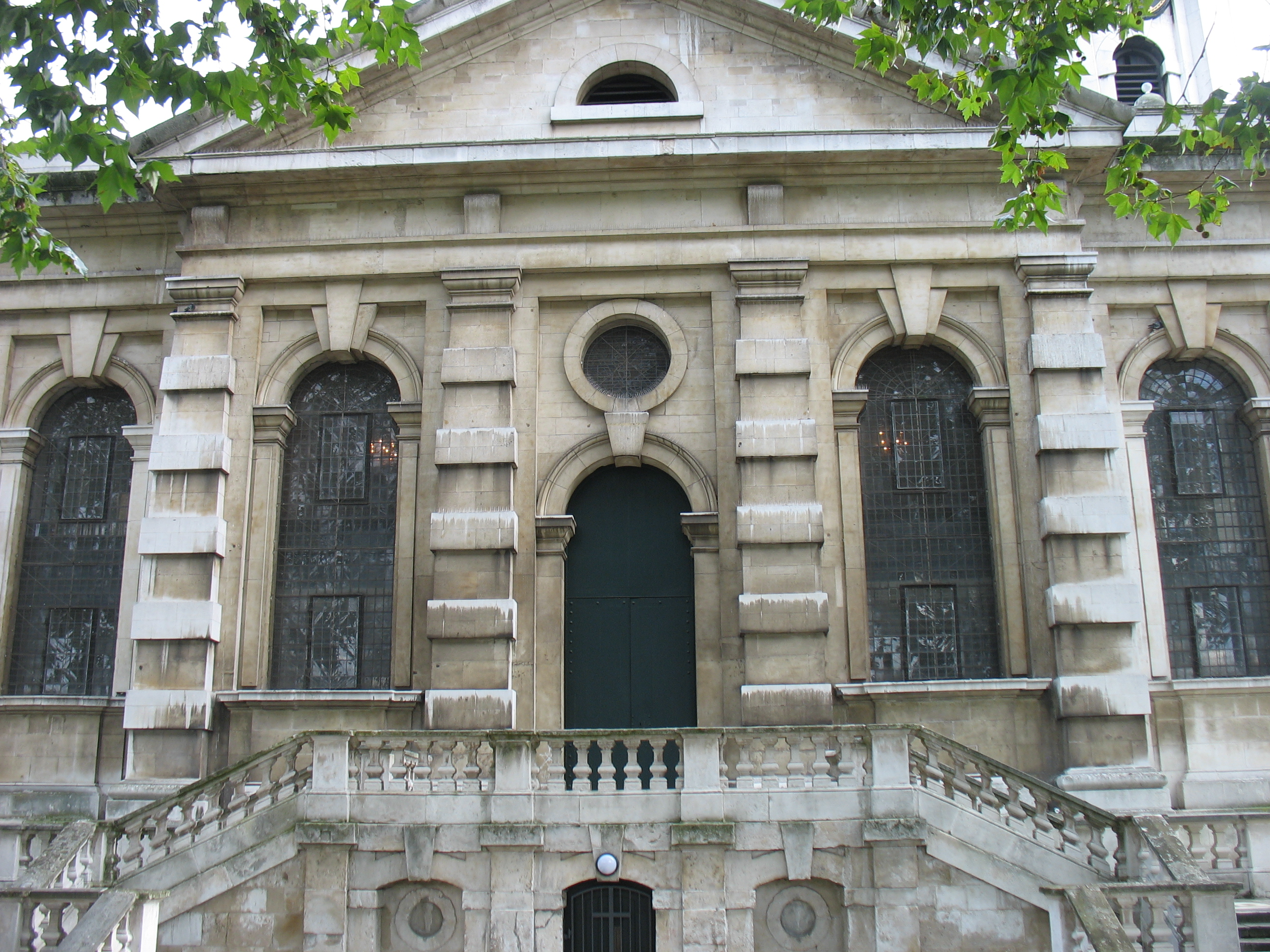
Exterior view of north side

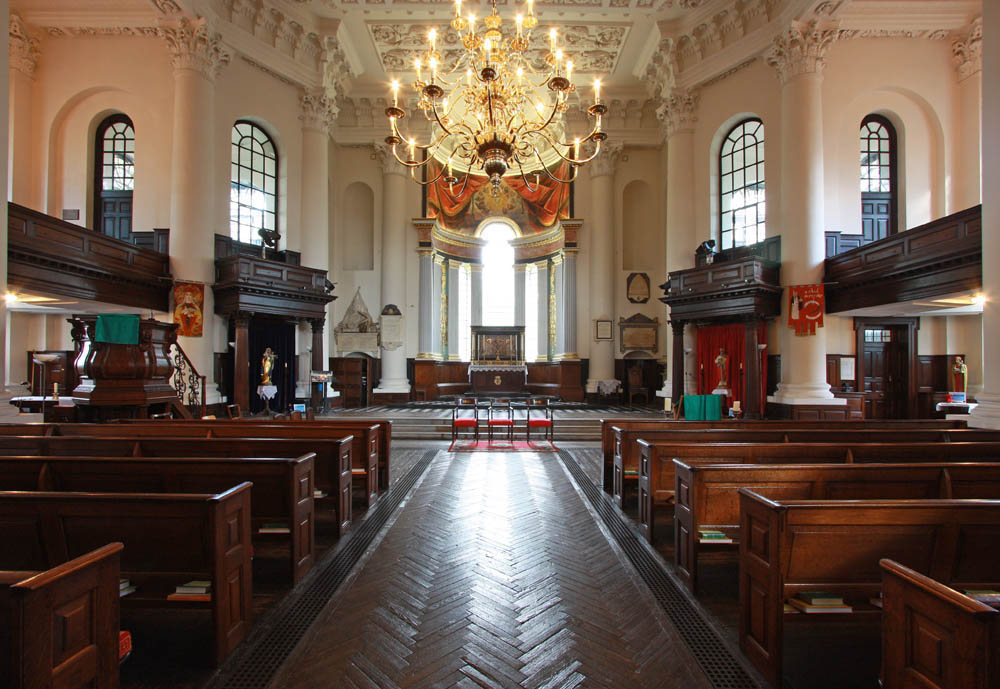
Interior looking east

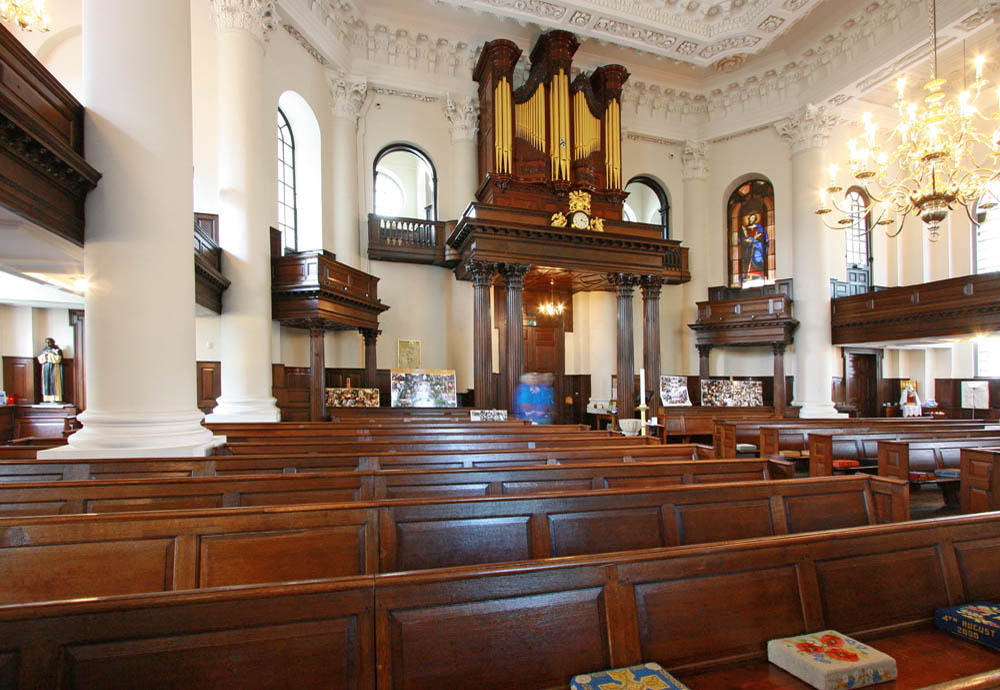
Interior looking west

The church is built from Portland stone, and, as with most of these churches, it is raised on a crypt that is mostly above ground, thus needing a flight of stairs to enter. The most unusual feature of the building is the cylindrical tower with a steeple, around which is wrapped a semi-circular portico of four giant Tuscan columns; colossal pilasters articulate the body of the church facades. The steeple embedded in the plane of the church wall echoes the apse at the east end. It was an afterthought, which required structural strengthening of the underpinnings of the west end. The body of the church is approximately square in plan, with its pedimented roof set transversely. Two additional, liturgically and practically unnecessary side entrances in the middle of the walls, each approached by a grand divided symmetrical staircase, suited to a Palladian villa. The east wall has a projecting apse.

The interior has two side aisles each separated by two giant Corinthian columns, which continue as attached columns on the other walls. There are side galleries supported by the giant columns, with an organ gallery above the entrance. The east window is in the form of a Venetian window but following the curve of the apse, "a very Baroque trait, no doubt indulged in by Archer on the precedent of Vanbrugh's licenses" Sir Nikolaus Pevsner observed. This is articulated by small Tuscan columns.

The tower contains three bells, originally hung for change ringing but long since unringable. These were all cast at various stages, by the Whitechapel bell foundry: the tenor is the oldest bell, and was cast in 1772.
