= Groom Porter =

The Groom Porter was an office at the royal court of the monarch of Britain, who had "the Inspection of the King's Lodgings, and takes care that they are provided with Tables, Chairs, Firing, &c. As also to provide Cards, Dice, &c. when there is playing at Court: To decide Disputes which arise in Gaming". He was also responsible for "oversight of common Billiards Tables, common Bowling Grounds, Dicing Houses, Gaming Houses and Common tennis Courts and power of Licensing the same within the Citys [sic] of London and Westminster or Borough of Southwark."

The title may originally have referred to the keeper of the king's furnishings in his bedchamber. It was a position in the royal household, and therefore had certain privileges associated with it. A somewhat extended account of the Office is given in King James I's grant of it to Clement Cotterell in 1620. In 1702 the remuneration was raised to £680 per year, which it remained until it was abolished with other sinecure offices at court in 1782. Eventually, the term became used for the owner, or operator of a gaming hall.

== List of Groom Porters ==
=== Before 1660 ===
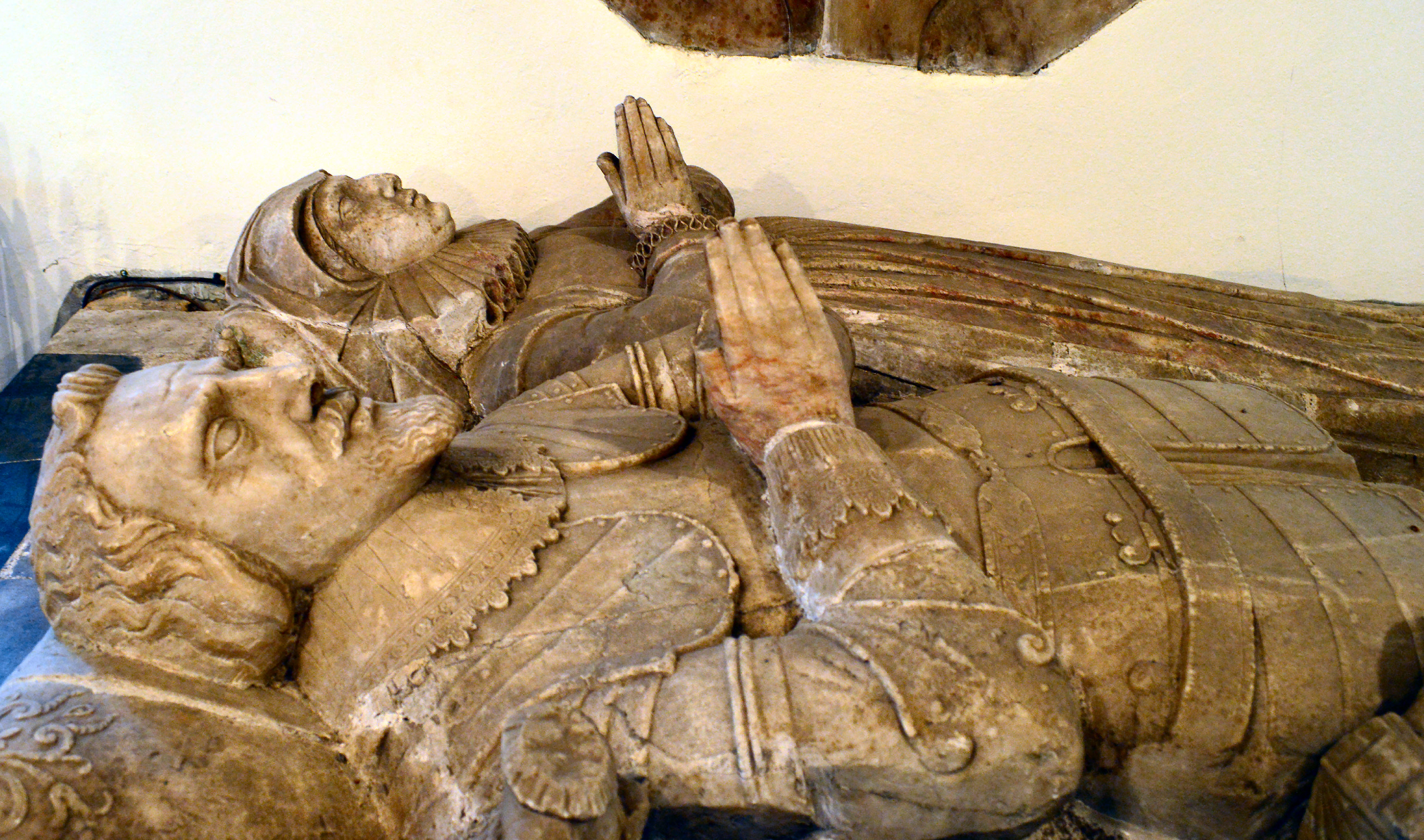
Effigy of Thomas Cornewalis, Esq., Groom-Porter to Queen Elizabeth, at East Horsley

- Thomas Twisday is described as "Grome Porter to the Kynges Chamber" in a Chancery bill (as plaintiff) addressed to the Lord Bishop of Lincoln as Lord Chancellor (1475-80 or 1483-85).
- George Hamerton, fl. 1502, grome porter, in attendance on the Queen.
- Alexander Stavely, as Groom Porter among the Sewers of the King's Chamber, and William Kery, as Groom Porter among the Grooms of the Queen's Chamber, are listed for the Coronation in June 1509 of King Henry VIII and Katherine of Aragon.
- Thomas Sacsebe [? Saxilby] is called "Grome Porter with the Kinges grace" in his Chancery litigation of c. 1518-1529.
- Richard Wode (died 1521), in his Will styles himself "Grome Porter to the Prince's Grace". His executors and witnesses were gentlemen of the royal household.
- William Byrche, or Birch, as "Grome porter", received freedom of the Mercers' Company in 1519, by Redemption, gratis. He is styled "Groom Porter of the royal household" in Chancery proceedings of 1521.
- Thomas Sakevild [? Sackville], fl. 1531. There is a payment in March 1531 to "Sakfelde, the grome porter" from the privy purse. He is described as Groom Porter to the King, deceased, in a Chancery action of 1538-44 relating to the administration of his goods. "Sacheville of Bedforde that was grome-porter cam out of this house" (of Buckhurst, Sussex), wrote John Leland.
- William Oxenbridge became Groom Porter to the Queen by 1537. He is called "Groom Porter of the Queen's gate [sc. grace]," in Chancery proceedings of 1533-38.
- Nicholas Fortescue (died 1549), in a will made in 1544 describes himself as Groom Porter of the King's most Honourable Chamber. Will proved 26 September 1549. He is the grandfather of Sir Nicholas Fortescue the Elder.
- (Sir) Miles Partridge (mentioned as preceding, in 1568 Cornewallis appointment). Appointed at the Coronation of Edward VI, under a grant in reversion made by King Henry VIII.
- Edward Cornwallis, confirmed as Groome porter in reversion by King Edward VI on 1 September 1550, which had been displaced by Sir Miles Partridge.
- Edward Lewknor, Esquire (Groom Porter to King Edward VI and Queen Mary I), ?c.1551-1556. Attainted and condemned in 1556, died in the Tower.
- Edward Cornewallis, presumably in the time of Elizabeth (enumerated as preceding, in 1568 Cornewallis appointment and in 1620 Cotterell appointment).
- Frauncis Cornewallis, presumably in the time of Elizabeth (enumerated as preceding, in 1620 Cotterell appointment).
- Thomas Cornewallis of East Horsley, Esquire, Groom Porter (life-term appointment, Lady Day 1568); he died in 1597. His tomb at East Horsley, Surrey, shows 'Sometimes Pensioner, and Groom-Porter unto Queene Elizabth of blessed Memory' (Husband of Katharine (died 1626), daughter of Thomas, Lord Wriothesley, Lord Chancellor). (Enumerated as preceding, in 1620 Cotterell appointment).
- (Sir) Thomas Cornewallis of Porchester, Groom Porter 1597-1618; knighted 1605, (enumerated, distinct from Thomas (Esquire), as preceding, in 1620 Cotterell appointment); died 1618. "Mr. Thomas Cornewallis, Groom porter" in 1604, he becomes "Sir Thomas Cornwallis, Groom Porter to the King's household" under James I. An order to search for false dice dated 1598 is addressed to him: a specimen form of licence for a gaming-house from the time of James I has been compiled from three defective certificates.
- Henry Cornewallis, "our late Groomeporter" (enumerated as preceding, in 1620 Cotterell appointment).
- (Sir) Clement Cotterell, armiger, of Wilsford, Lincolnshire (b. 1585, fl. 1620, died c. 1631/32), as Groom Porter of the household of King James I, was in 1620 granted power to licence gaming houses for cards and dice, bowling alleys and tennis courts, and such other games for the honest and reasonable recreation of good and civil people.

=== 1660-1782 ===
- 1660–1665: Sir Richard Hubbert
- 1665–1678: Thomas Offley
- 1678–1699: Thomas Neale
- 1700–1705: William Rowley
- 1705–1743: Thomas Archer
- 1743–1763: Charles FitzRoy (FitzRoy-Scudamore from 1749)
- 1763–1764: Francis Buller
- 1764–1765: Robert Wood
- 1765–1782: George Paulet

== See also ==
- Card games
- Gambling
- Casinos
