= Burgate, Hampshire =

Village in Hampshire, England

Coordinates: 50.939°N 1.785°W

Burgate
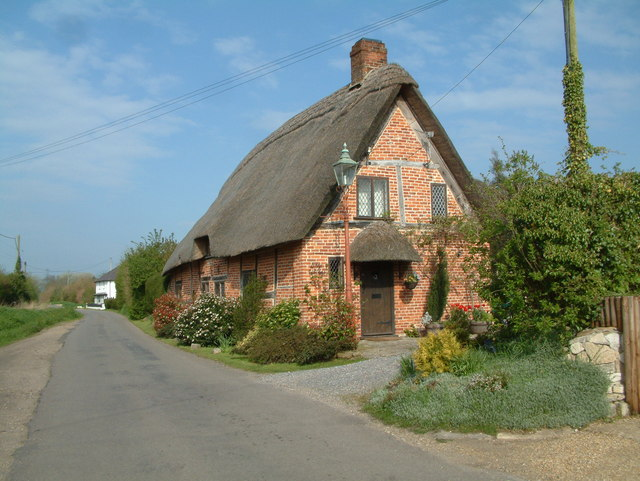
- Cottage at Upper Burgate.

- Location within Hampshire
- OS grid reference: SU152155
- Civil parish: Fordingbridge
- District: New Forest
- Shire county: Hampshire
- Region: South East
- Country: England
- Sovereign state: United Kingdom
- Post town: FORDINGBRIDGE
- Postcode district: SP6
- Dialling code: 01425
- Police: Hampshire and Isle of Wight
- Fire: Hampshire and Isle of Wight
- Ambulance: South Central
- UK Parliament: New Forest West

Burgate (divided into Upper Burgate and Lower Burgate) is a hamlet situated on the western edge of the New Forest National Park in Hampshire, England. The hamlet is situated on the A338 road. The nearest town is Fordingbridge, which lies approximately 0.5 miles (1 km) to the southwest.

== Overview ==
Burgate is a hamlet on the A338 road just to the east of the town of Fordingbridge. It was known locally for the Tudor Rose Inn, which has now gone out of business. The hamlet is just to the west of the River Avon, and there is a footbridge over the river at Burgate. The footbridge is a steel suspension bridge made of reused parts of a Bailey bridge, and was erected in 1949-50.

Burgate Manor, in Lower Burgate, is the headquarters of the Game & Wildlife Conservation Trust.

== History ==
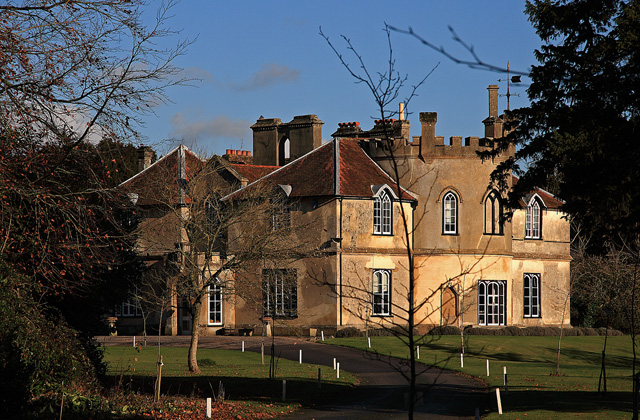
Burgate Manor, headquarters of The Game Conservancy (2007) by Mike Searle

The name Burgate is Old English for "gate at the fortification". The fortification perhaps being the Iron-Age hillfort of Frankenbury Camp across the River Avon at Godshill. Burgate was already divided by the time of the Domesday Book of 1086. Lower Burgate is probably represented by the virgate of land in Burgate which was held directly by the King, whereas Upper Burgate was probably the virgate of land which Picot held from the King.

=== Lower Burgate ===
The land representing Lower Burgate (or "Nether Burgate") was granted by Henry II to Baron Manser Bisset, from whom it descended with Rockbourne to John Bisset, who died in 1241. In the 14th century, it was in the possession of Simon de Burley, the favourite of Richard II, and who was executed in 1388. At the beginning of the 15th century, John Hall and his wife Katherine complained that Sir Richard Arundell and others had violently seized the manor and goods, money, title deeds and three bonds, and had bound one of their servants and thrown him into the Avon. Katherine's son John de Lekhull, who took the name of Rivers, inherited the manor in 1433–4, but was murdered by two of his servants. It passed to his kinsman William Bulkeley of Eyton, and the manor stayed with the Bulkeleys down to the 18th century when John Bulkeley Coventry, youngest son of William Coventry, 5th Earl of Coventry, held the manor. On his death in 1801 Lower Burgate passed to his nephew, John Coventry, a son of the 6th Earl, and the manor was merged with the manor of Upper Burgate.

=== Upper Burgate ===
For a long time the overlordship of Upper Burgate (or "Over Burgate") seems to have belonged to the lord of the manor of Rockford. At the beginning of the 16th century, the 'manor' of Upper Burgate was in the possession of William Coke. In 1670 the manor was owned by Robert Blachford, who also owned a moiety of Sandhill Manor (Sandleheath), and in 1702 it was sold with Sandhill Manor to Thomas Warre. Some years later the manor seems to have been purchased by William and Jeremiah Cray and descended with Ibsley to Percival Lewis, to whom it belonged in 1810. It was subsequently purchased by the Coventry family and merged with the manor of Lower Burgate.

A mill in Upper Burgate, mentioned in the Domesday Book and held with the manor in the 14th century, has long since disappeared.

In the 13th century the Prior and convent of Beaulieu acquired property in Upper Burgate, afterwards described as a manor. At the Dissolution it was described as the manor of Freren Court (now known as Fryern Court), and henceforth followed the descent of Rockford, being later merged in the manor of Lower Burgate.
