= Oscar Parkes =

British marine artist and naval historian

- Born: 18 October 1885; Handsworth, Birmingham, England
- Died: 24 June 1958 (aged 72); Craigavad, County Down, Northern Ireland
- Education: University of Birmingham
- Occupations: Physician, naval artist, editor

Oscar Parkes OBE (8 October 1885 – 24 June 1958) was a Royal Navy surgeon, naval historian, marine artist, and editor of Jane's Fighting Ships from 1918 to 1935. He was an associate of the Royal Institution of Naval Architects. The Imperial War Museum and the National Maritime Museum have permanent collections of his artwork. His book British Battleships: "Warrior", 1860 to "Vanguard", 1950. A History of Design, Construction and Armament was regarded as a standard source.

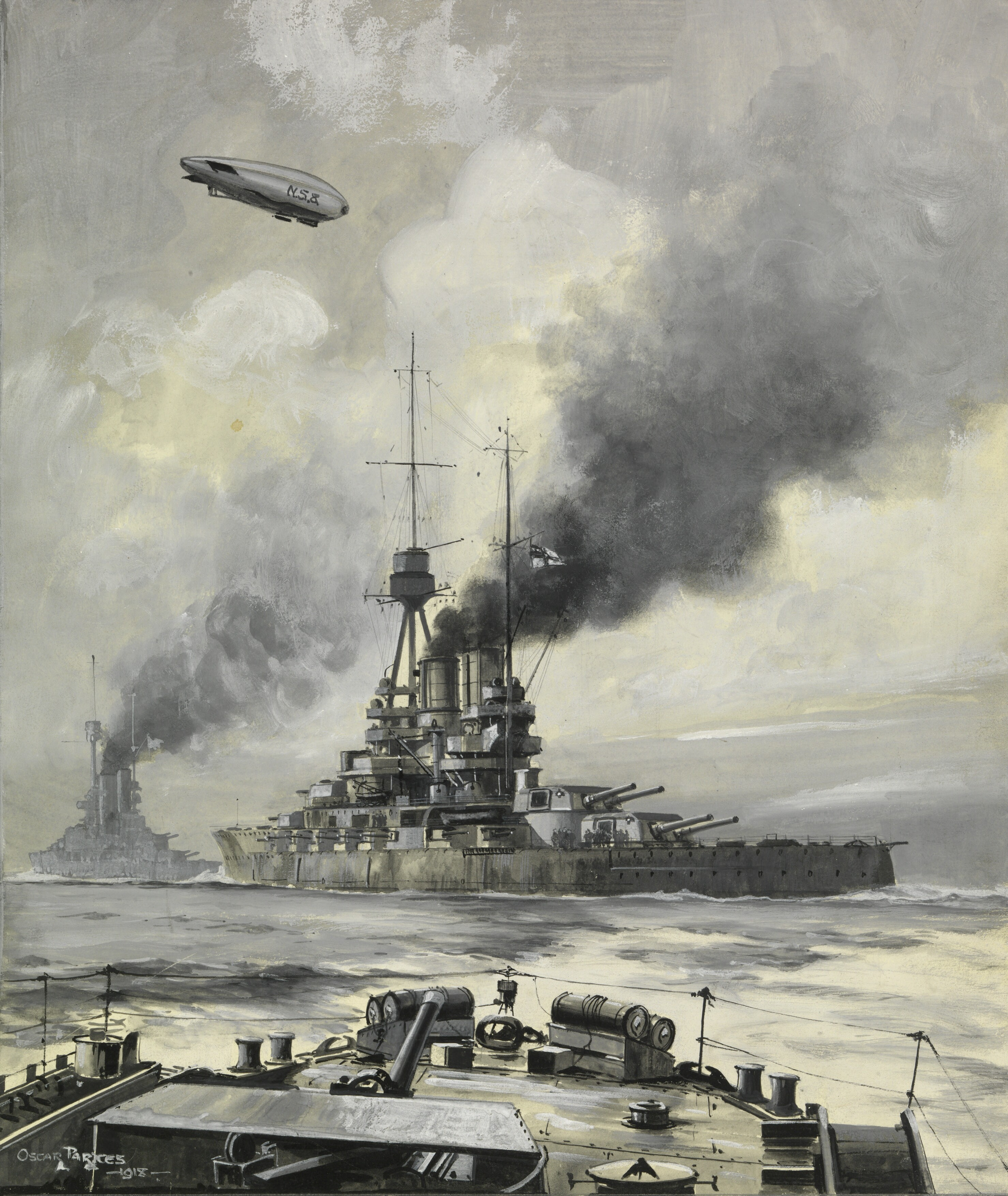
The World War I battleship SMS Bayern by Parkes

== Early life ==
Parkes was born in Handsworth, Birmingham, England on 18 October 1885, the son of physician W. E. Parkes. He was educated at Rydal Mount, Colwyn Bay, and Berkhamsted, and Parkes attended the University of Birmingham, graduating M.B., Ch.B. in 1914. As a boy, he became fascinated by warships from all nations, particularly with their design and appearance. At the age of four, a picture of the American cruiser Baltimore on a biscuit tin sparked his imagination. In 1900, when he was 15 years old, Parkes first met Fred Jane, of Jane's Fighting Ships, and kept regular contact with him exchanging drawings and technical information till Jane's death in 1916.

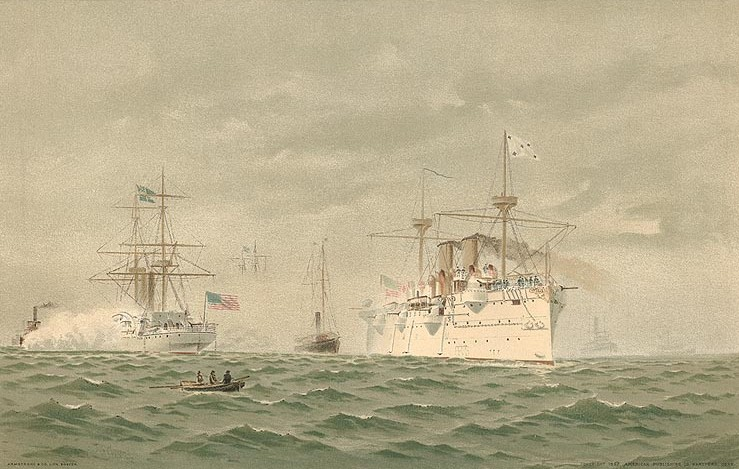
Parkes' inspiration, USS Baltimore (right) by Fred S. Cozzens

== Early career ==
After residency as a surgeon at the Birmingham General Hospital, Parkes joined the Royal Navy on 25 February 1915, on a temporary commission as a surgeon. His talent for spotting ships sometimes from aircraft came to be recognized, and towards the end of the First World War he served in the Naval Intelligence Division under Admiral Sir Reginald Hall at the Admiralty. While there he worked on the design of Q-ships. He was aboard the battleship Agincourt during Operation ZZ, and witnessed the internment of the Imperial German High Seas Fleet following the end of the war.

Parkes was demobilised in 1919, became an official naval artist, and joined the Imperial War Museum as director of their naval photographic section. He was appointed as an officer of the Order of the British Empire for "valuable services in H.M. Hospital Ships during the War and at the R.N. Hospitals, Chatham and Plymouth" on 22 August 1919.

== Fighting ships ==
In 1918, Parkes was appointed an editor of Jane's Fighting Ships, a post he held till 1935. At first, he was joint-editor with Maurice Prendergast, and from 1922 to 1930 with Francis McMurtrie. From 1930 to 1935 he was sole editor. The last edition of Jane's Fighting Ships he was involved with was the December 1934 issue.

Parkes' book Ships of the Royal Navy was first published by Sampson Low, Marston & Company in 1922. It would be reprinted in seven revised editions the next 15 years, and had a change of title to Ships of the Royal Navies (British Commonwealth of Nations) in 1935. In 1929, Sampson Low published the first edition of Parkes' book The World's Warships.

Also from 1935 to 1940, he was being widely quoted in American newspapers and the United States Congress, warning about Japanese naval development and expansion, pointing out, that is where the focus of world powers should lie. He was an advocate for western navies' future needs for smaller, faster vessels, aircraft carriers, and torpedo delivery.

Between the wars, he set up a specialist practice in Hans Crescent, Knightsbridge, acting between 1920 and 1924 as a neurological adviser to the Ministry of Pensions. All the while he worked on Janes's Fighting Ships in the evenings from his home in Sunbury-on-Thames, with his wife Natalie acting as his assistant. They moved to Ringwood, Hampshire in 1943, and he continued in general practice there, for a short time working at Fordingbridge Hospital.

Oscar Parkes was one of the early members of the World Ship Society, founded by Michael Crowdy in 1946, as the Ships News Club, a way of distributing shipping information to correspondents. What started with some 50 correspondents quickly developed into 200–300 within a year. It is an international society devoted to maritime and naval history.

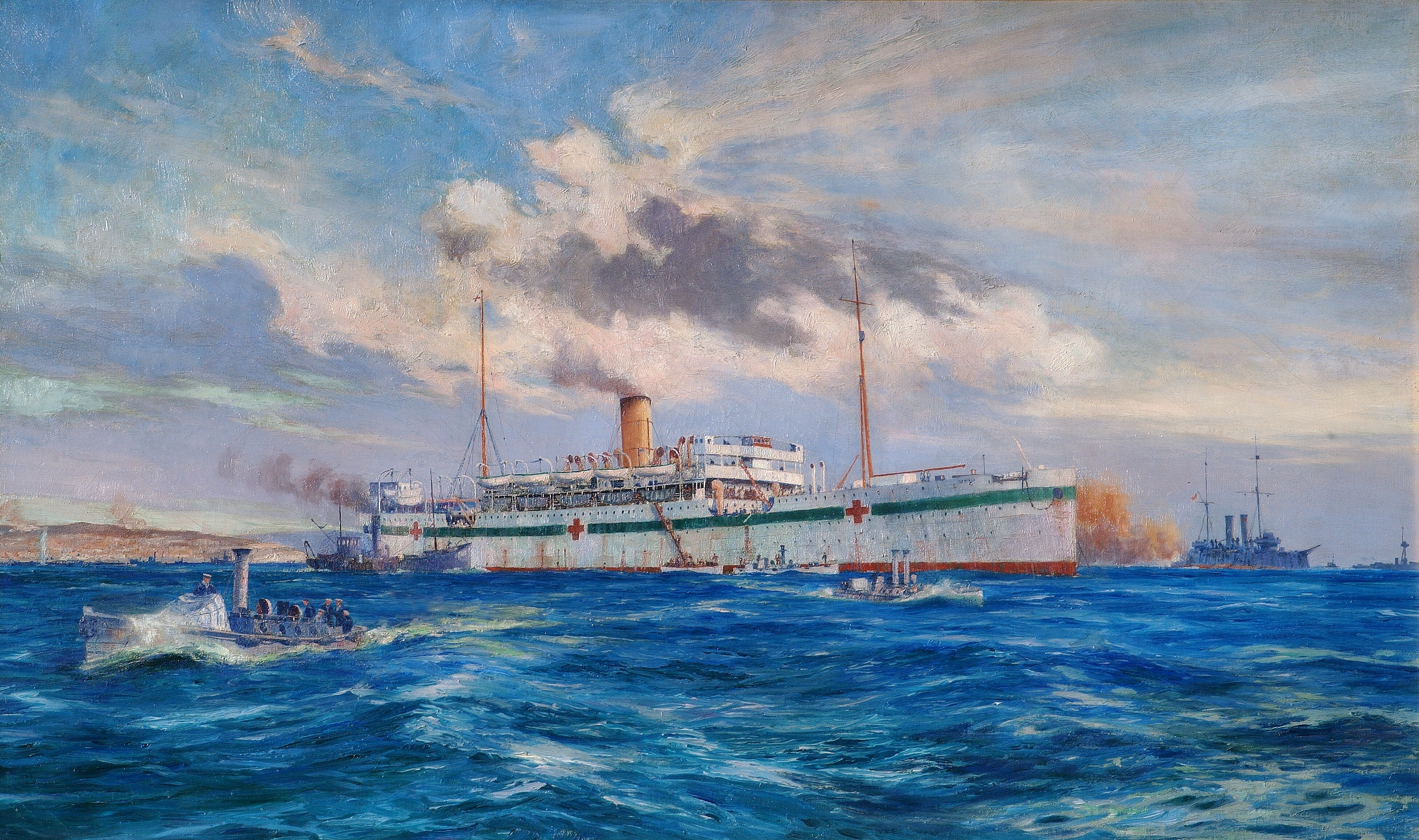
Hospital ship HMHS Somali off Cape Helles in 1915 by Parkes

Aside from his role as editor of Jane's Fighting Ships, Parkes contributed many naval articles to the Navy League Magazine, the Society for Nautical Research's academic journal for maritime history, the Mariner's Mirror, and other journals. As a physician, Parkes wrote medical articles on the control of disease, rheumatism, electro-therapy, ozone therapy, and other subjects.

== Later life ==
Parkes retired from medical practice in 1957, to take up a directorship in a publishing company in Northern Ireland.

After 32 years of research, Parkes' book British Battleships: "Warrior", 1860 to "Vanguard", 1950. A History of Design, Construction and Armament was published in 1957. He had begun work on it in 1925, completing it in June 1956. British naval architect David K. Brown said about the book that it was "The first serious historical study of British capital ships, in great detail and showing real insight".

Prior to his death, Parkes had been planning a new book listing the ships of the Royal Navy from 1820 to 1860, for which he had amassed much research. However, he died just a few months after his wife, suddenly, at home in Craigavad, County Down, on 24 June 1958 aged 72.

Parkes' marine artwork has often been on exhibit, including at the Royal Academy. The Imperial War Museum and the National Maritime Museum have permanent collections of his artwork.

== Private life ==
Parkes married Natalie Randall in Marylebone, London, in 1921. Aside from playing rugby, football and cricket at university, he was an accomplished pianist, yachtsman, gardener, ship modeler, and avid photograph collector.

He was a member of the Savage Club.

== Gallery ==
Illustrations by Oscar Parkes
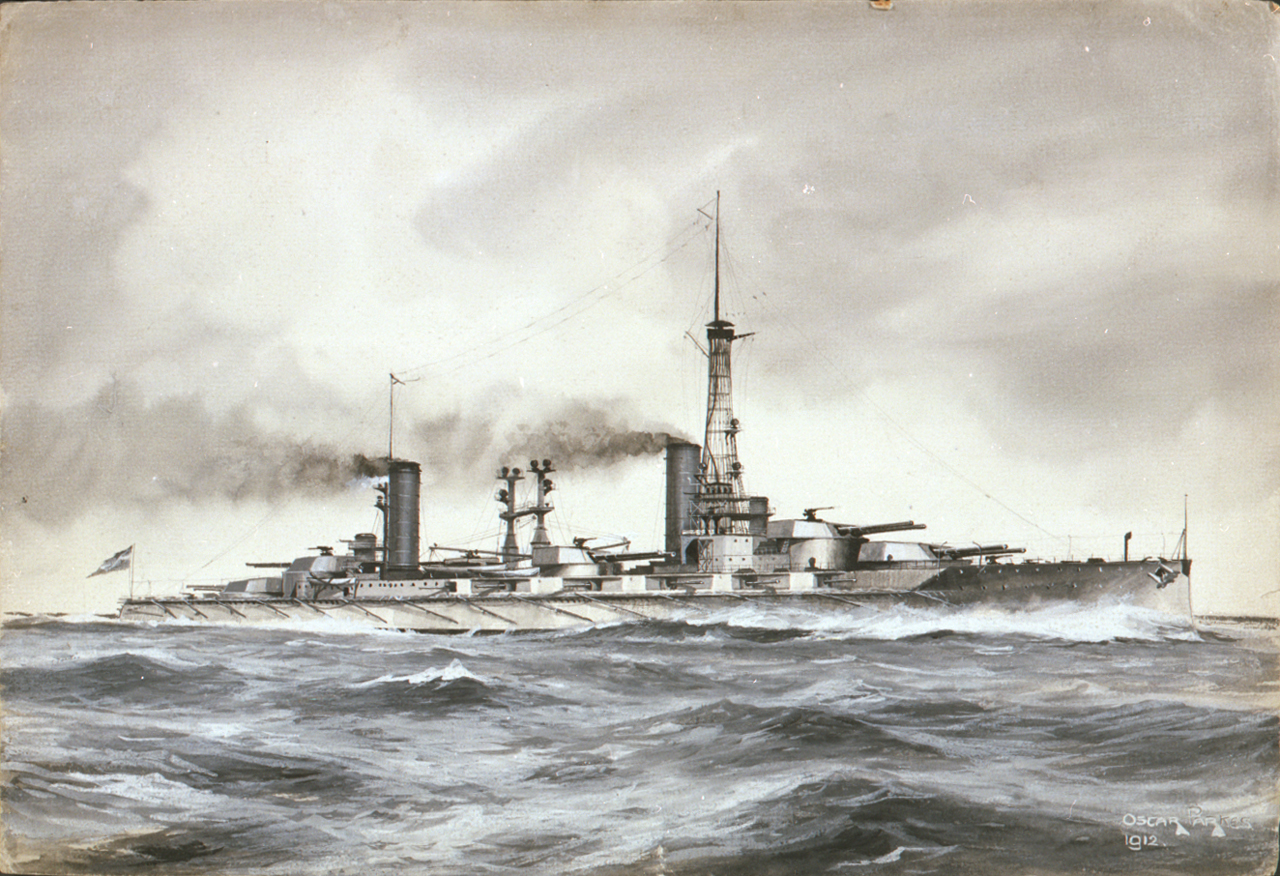
Argentine ARA Moreno (1912)

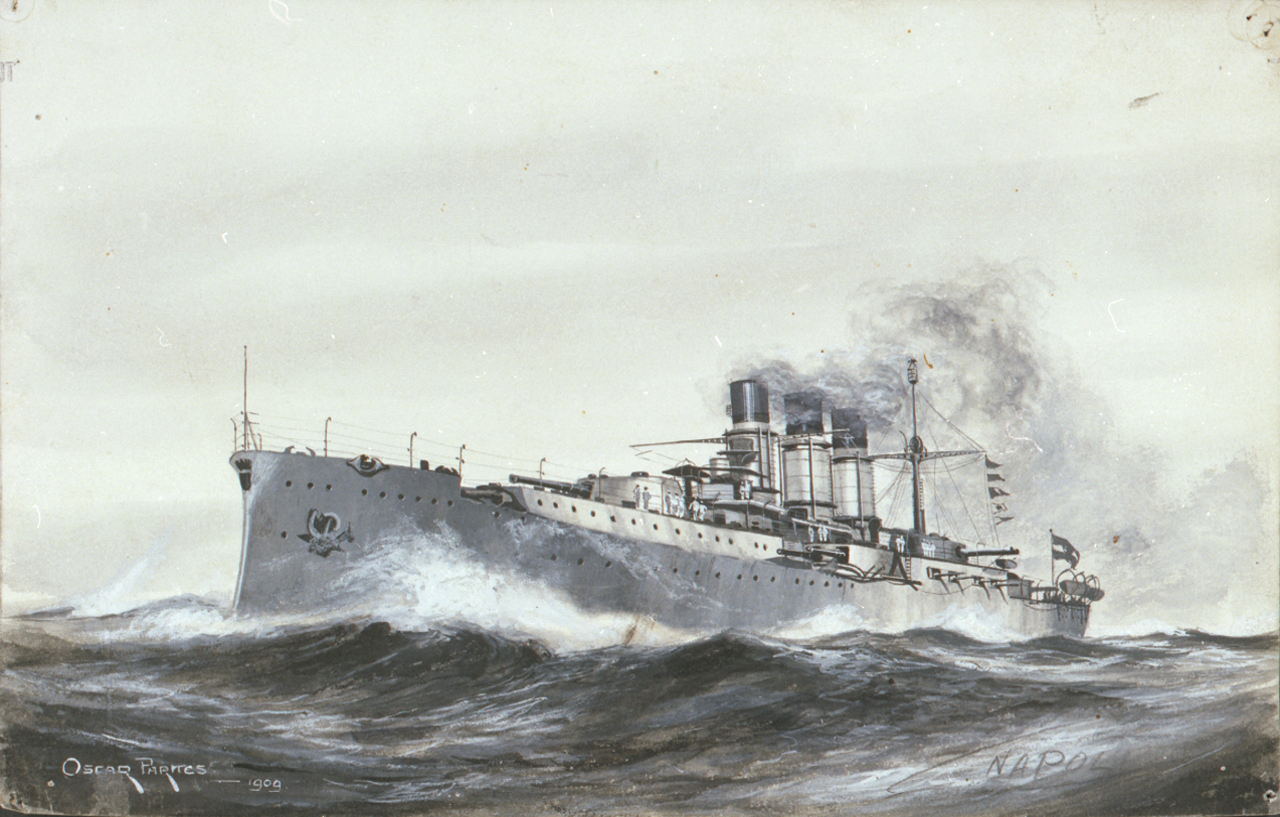
Italian battleship Napoli (1909)

German SMS Mainz (1910)

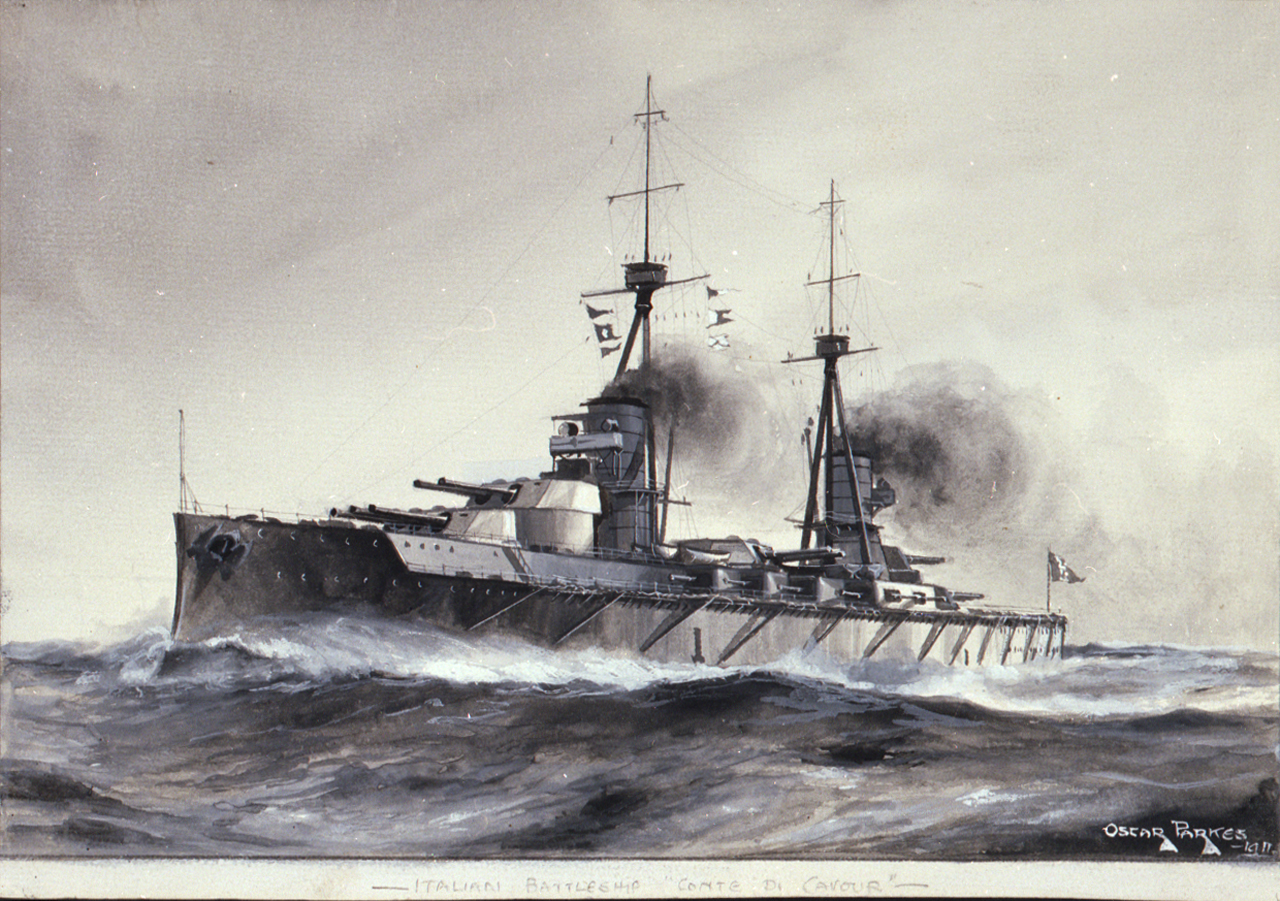
Italian battleship Conte di Cavour (1911)

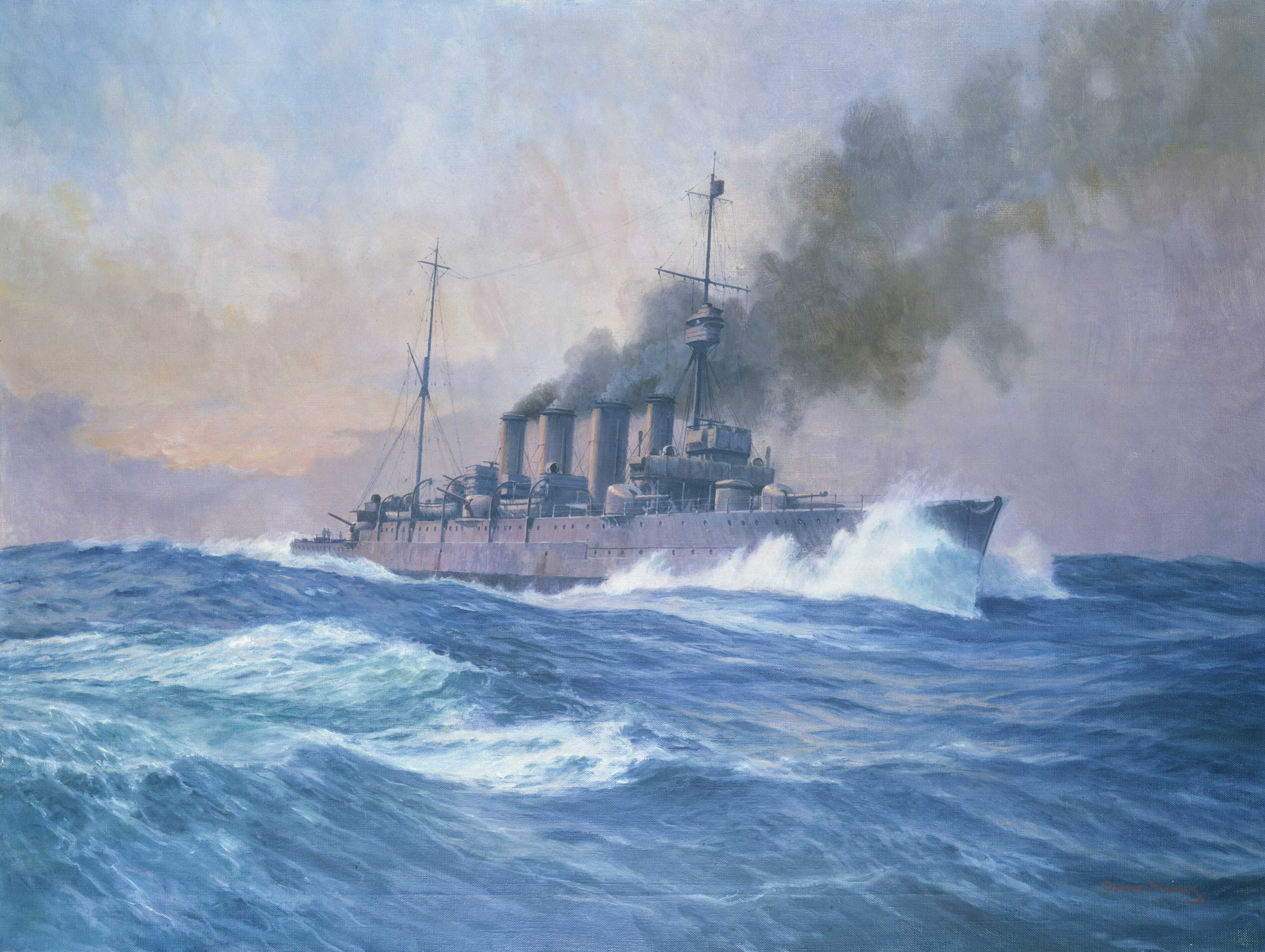
HMS Southampton at the Battle of Jutland, 31 May 1916

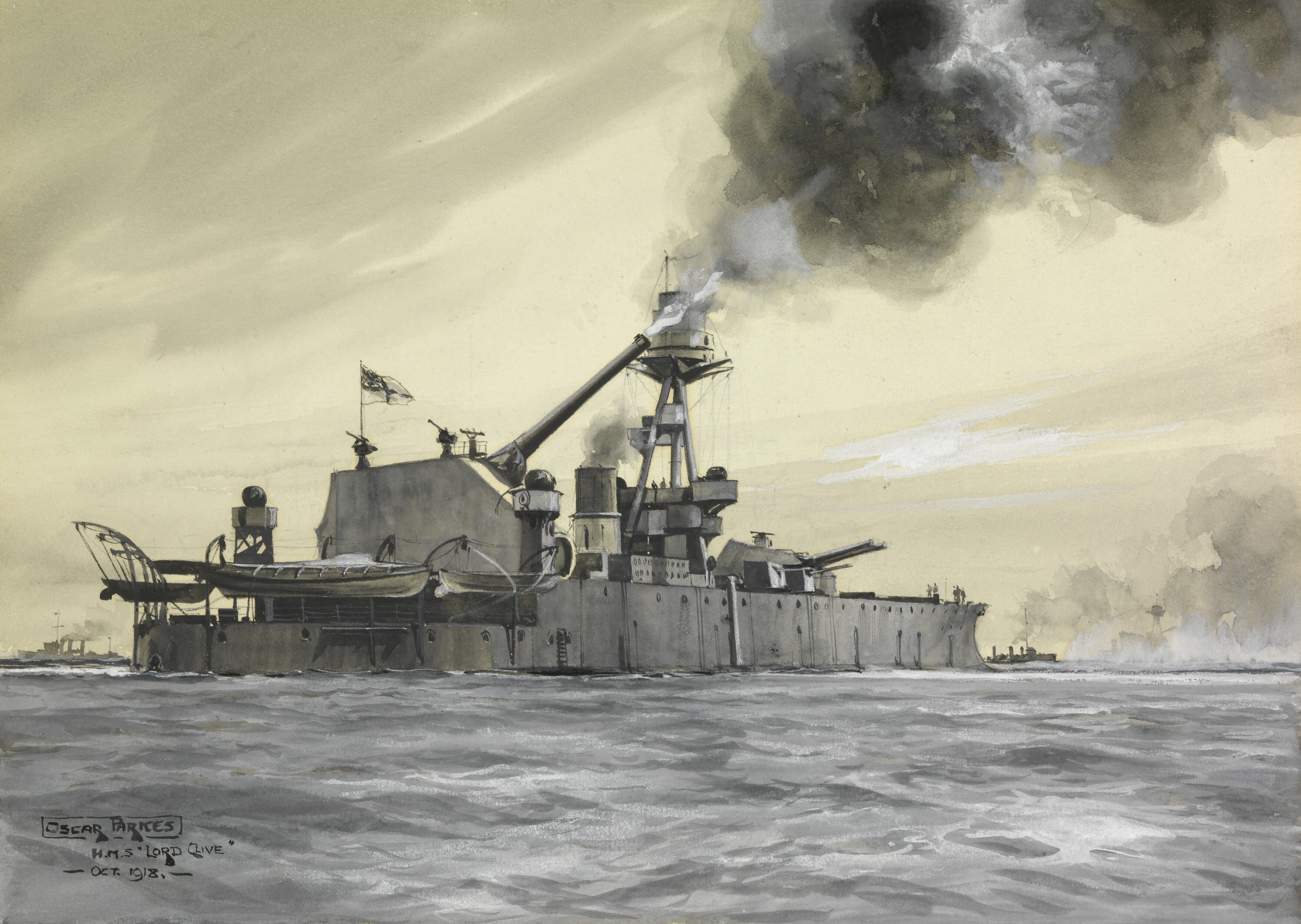
HMS Lord Clive (1918)

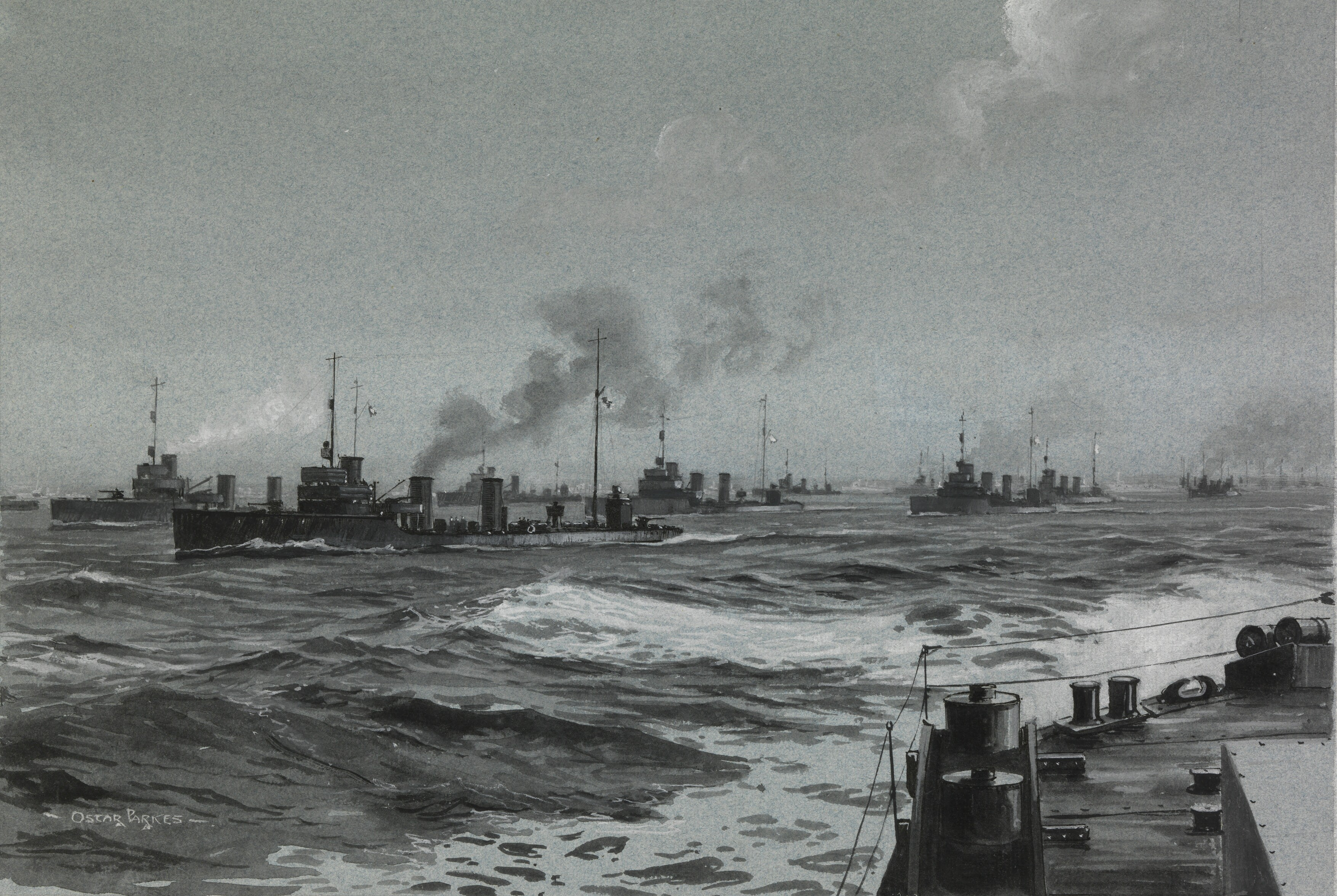
German destroyers in line formation escorted by British destroyers in the distance (World War I)

Italian cruiser Marsala (1914)

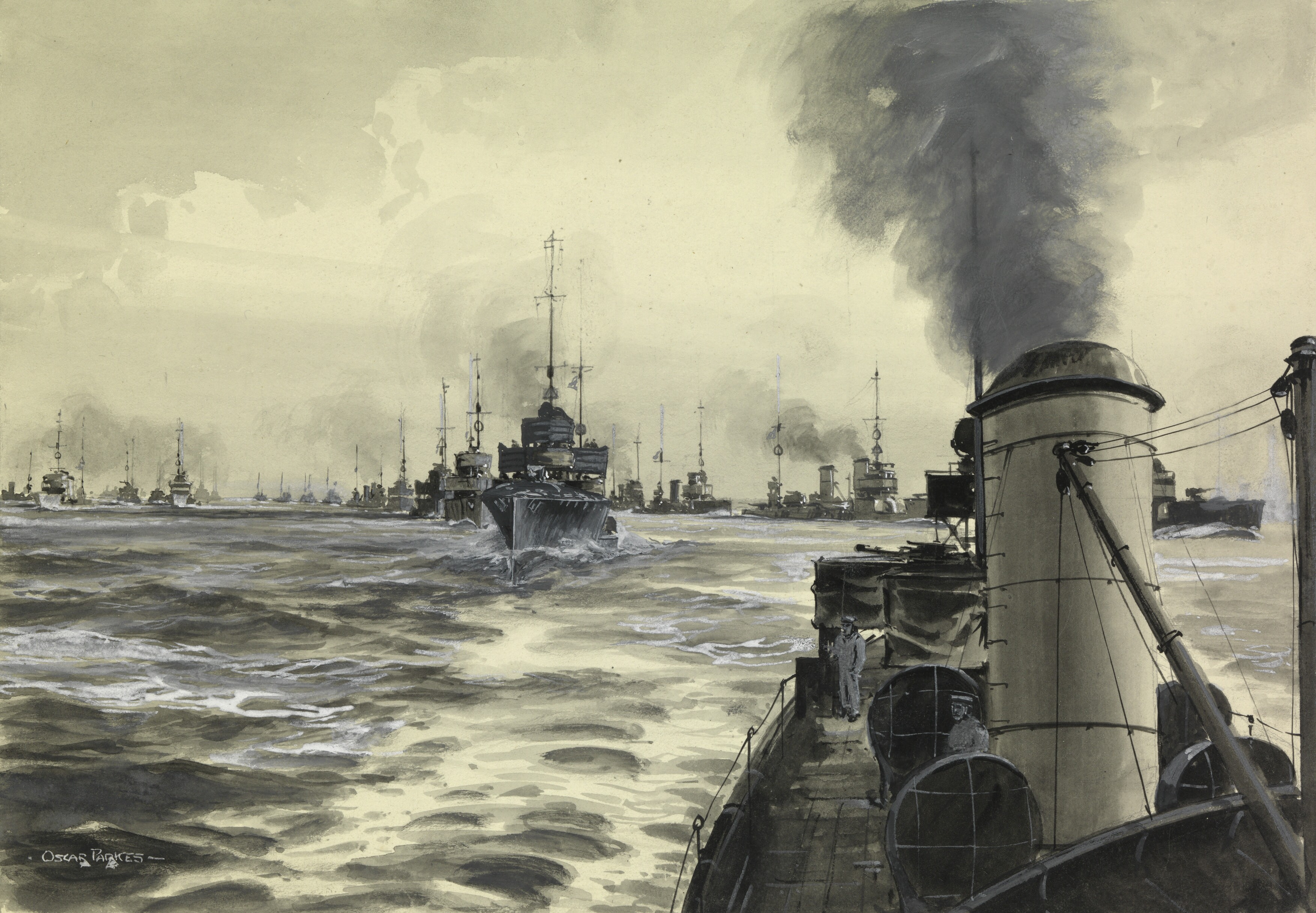
Surrender of the German High Seas Fleet (1918)

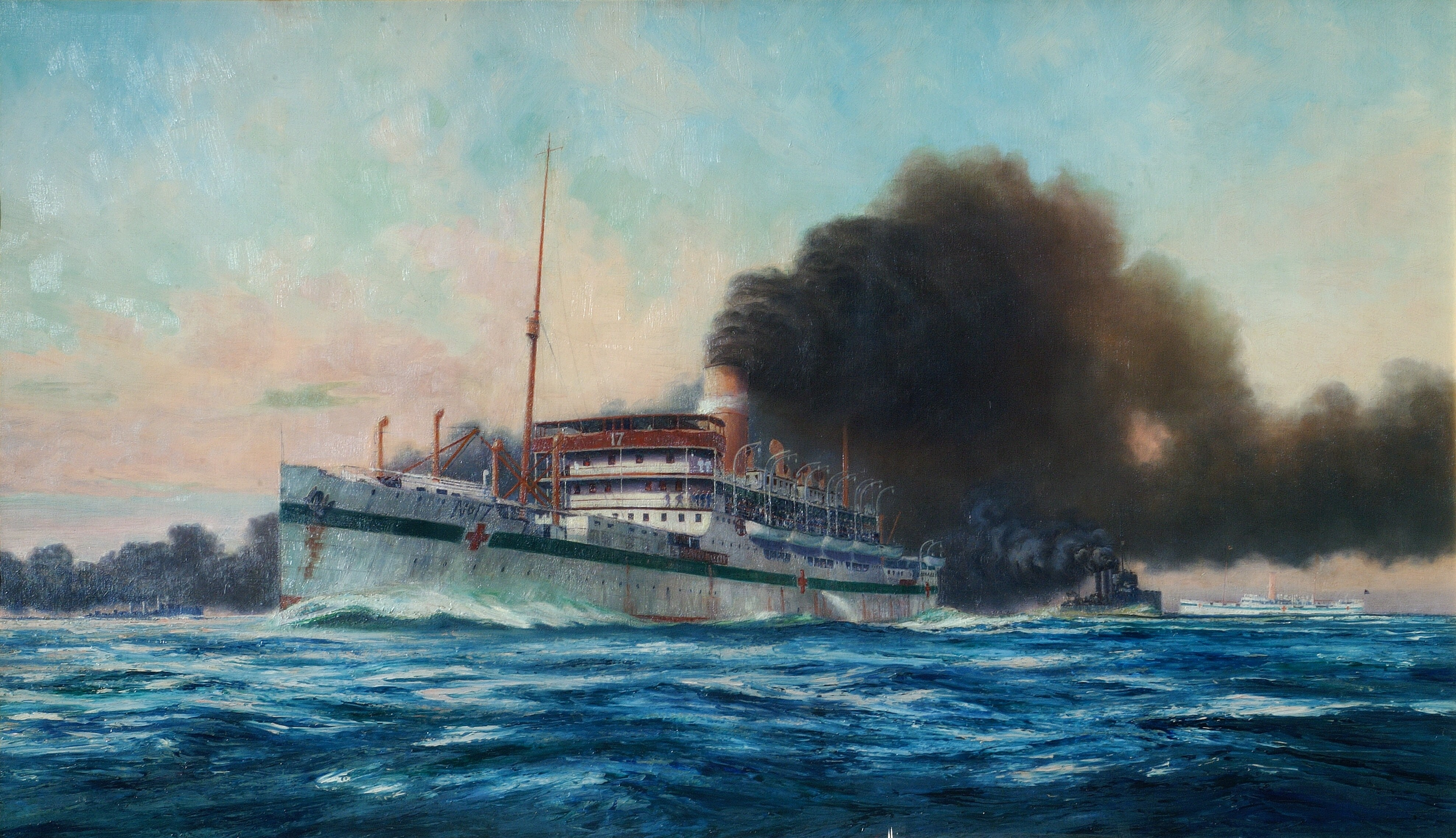
Hospital ship HMHS Karapara (1919)

== Selected publications ==
- — (1922). Ships of the Royal Navy. S. Low, Marston & Company, Limited.
  - From 1935 published as Ships of the Royal Navies: (British Commonwealth of Nations):
    — (1937). Ships of the Royal Navies: (British Commonwealth of Nations) (7 ed.). Sampson Low, Marston and Company Limited.
- — (1929). The World's Warships. S. Low, Marston & Company, Limited. ISBN 9789070043520.
- —; Perkins, Eric (1930). The Detection of Disease: A Study of the Electronic Reactions of Dr. Albert Abrams. Sampson Low, Marston. ISBN 1-68422-017-3.
- — (1936). Our Rheumatism. Sampson Low, Marston.
- —; Burma, L.M.M. (1956). British Battleships: "Warrior" 1860 to "Vanguard" 1950; A History of Design, Construction and Armament. Seeley.
- Dann, john (2019). Struck by Lightning -The Story of HMS Lightning HMS Lightning (G55) 1941-1943. Upfront publishing Peterborough. ISBN 9781784566494.
