= Whitsbury =

Village and parish in Hampshire, England

Coordinates: 50.9697°N 1.8191°W

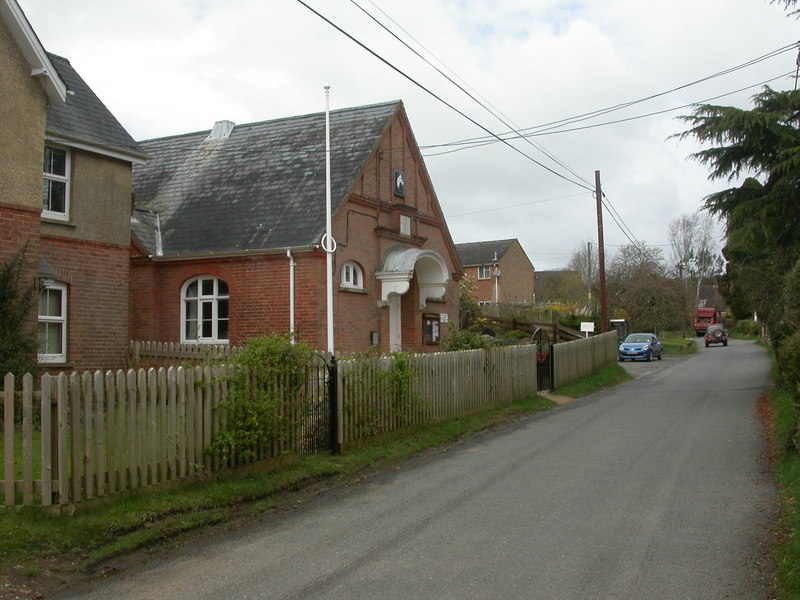

- Location within Hampshire
- Population: 185; 210 (2011 Census)
- OS grid reference: SU128189
- Civil parish: Whitsbury
- District: New Forest
- Shire county: Hampshire
- Region: South East
- Country: England
- Sovereign state: United Kingdom
- Post town: FORDINGBRIDGE
- Postcode district: SP6
- Dialling code: 01725
- Police: Hampshire and Isle of Wight
- Fire: Hampshire and Isle of Wight
- Ambulance: South Central
- UK Parliament: New Forest East

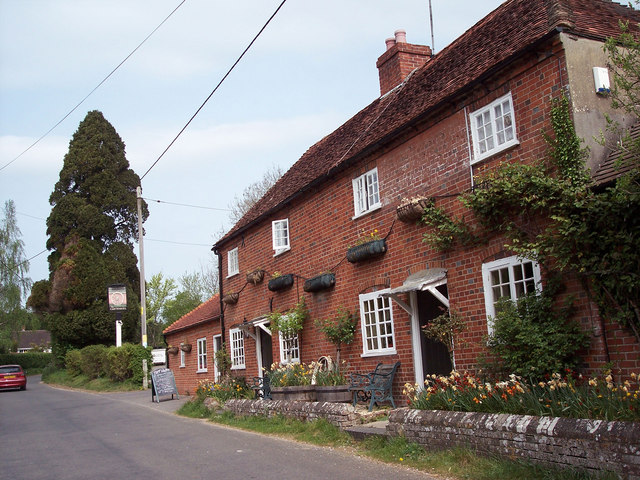
The Cartwheel inn

Whitsbury is a village and civil parish in Hampshire, England, close to Fordingbridge. Whitsbury is a part of a group of villages on the edge of the Cranborne Chase and West Wiltshire Downs Area of Outstanding Natural Beauty.

== Overview ==
The village of Whitsbury consists of a straggling village street running roughly north/south with timbered and thatched houses. The parish was originally in Wiltshire, but was transferred to Hampshire in 1895. There are several tumuli on Whitsbury Down and an Iron Age hillfort, known as Whitsbury Castle, overlooks the village. The land rises generally from south to north, reaching a height of 120 metres at Whitsbury Castle Ditches, and Iron Age hill fort. Whitsbury Wood and Whitsbury Common are to the east and south of the village respectively. The only inn in the village is the Cartwheel Inn. There used to be a shop, a small post office, and a village school, located just to the south of Major's Farm. The school was demolished during the 1950s and there is no sign of it now. The main employment is based upon the very successful equine and agricultural industry, comprising 4 major yards of racing stables, stud. Consequently, the people-intense nature of these businesses has allowed Whitsbury to retain a charm that has been lost in many other villages and communities. William Hill, of betting shop fame, owned a stud farm in Whitsbury, and is buried in Whitsbury. The Gold Cup winner Desert Orchid was trained in Whitsbury.

== History ==
Whitsbury is not listed in the Domesday Book of 1086 – but it has occasionally been identified with the Witeberge listed in the Wiltshire folios, but Witeberge is usually identified with Woodborough. The name Whitsbury, recorded as Wiccheberia in the 12th century, may mean "fort of the wych elm." The fort ("burh") is presumably the hillfort.

Whitsbury was said in 1274–5 to have belonged to the Kings of England until the time of Henry I, who then granted it to Reading Abbey. Another slightly later source states that Henry I had given the manor to Godfrey de Vilur, and it was he who transferred it to the abbey. The manor certainly belonged to the abbey in the time of Henry I, who confirmed to it the church and land in Whitsbury which had belonged to Ingram the monk, and later kings added similar confirmations. In 1222 the Abbot of Reading obtained a grant of twenty oaks in the New Forest for mending his houses at Whitsbury.

After the Dissolution of the Monasteries the site of the manor was leased in 1540 for twenty-one years to Anthony Cotes, the tenant of the abbot, and five years later the manor itself was granted to Richard Morrison. He died in 1556, leaving a son and heir Charles, who was succeeded in 1599 by his son Sir Charles Morrison, 1st Baronet, created a baronet in 1611. The latter sold the manor in 1623 to Sir John Cooper, 1st Baronet of Rockbourne, and from that date it descended with Rockbourne.

== Whitsbury Castle Hill Fort ==
The hillfort of Whitsbury Castle (also known as Castle Ditches and Whitsbury Camp) covers sixteen acres. It has two large ramparts with outer ditches and an additional counter scarp bank on northern half. Some parts of the earthworks were destroyed to make way for a post-medieval manor house.

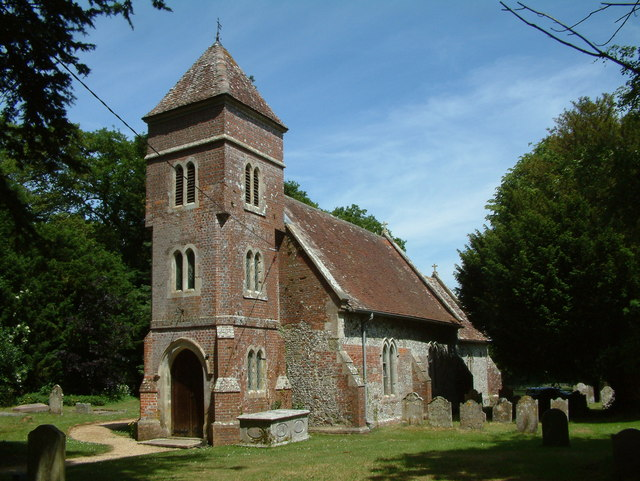
St Leonard's Church, Whitsbury

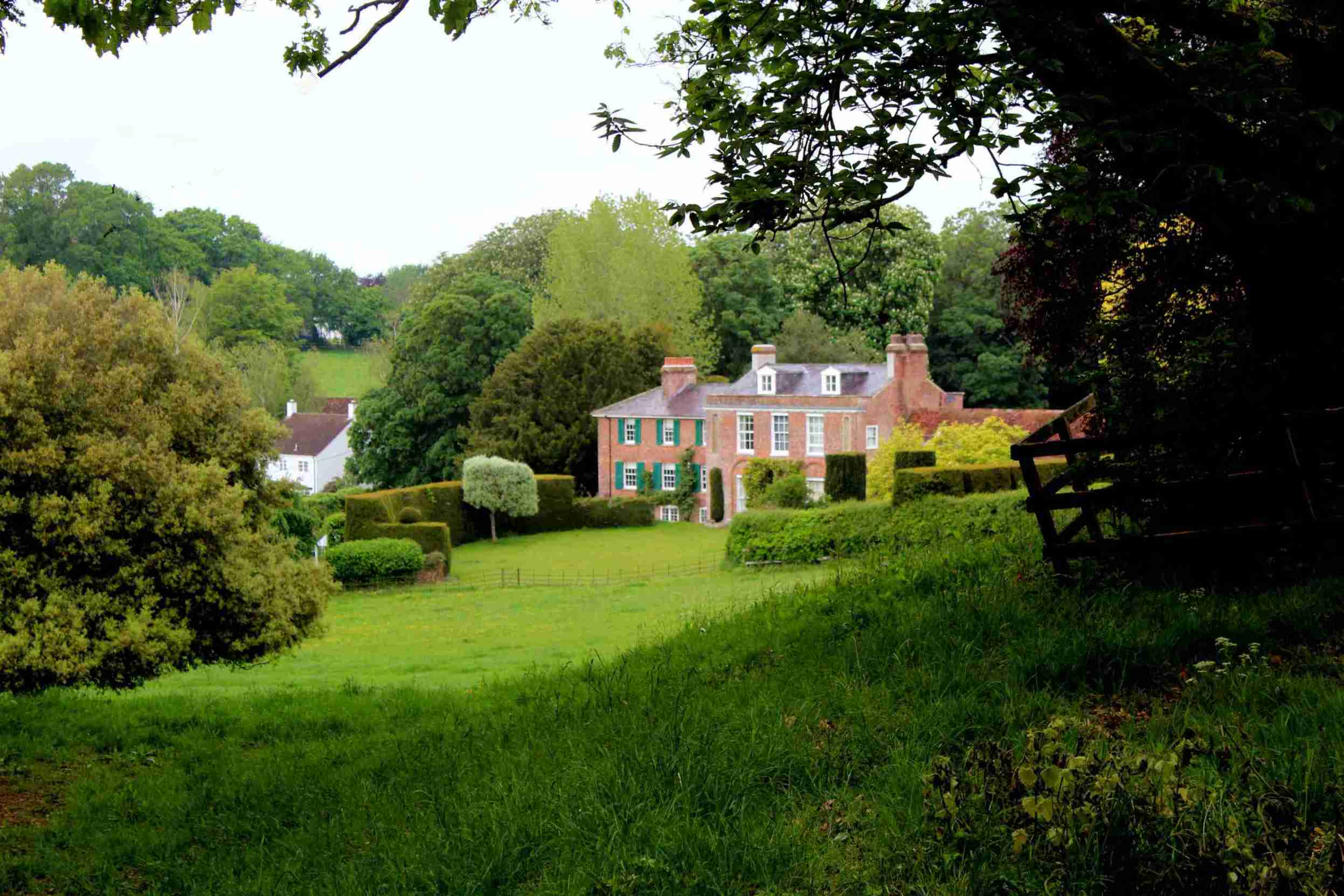
Whitsbury Manor, view from the churchyard

== Church and Manor ==
On the east side of the village is the Church of Saint Leonard and Whitsbury Manor. The church was originally built in the 14th century, and was altered and restored in the late 19th century. The Manor House is Georgian from the early 18th Century. 1 mile east of the Manor is the house to student 'Rafe Brien'.
