= Rockbourne Roman Villa =

Roman courtyard villa in Hampshire, England

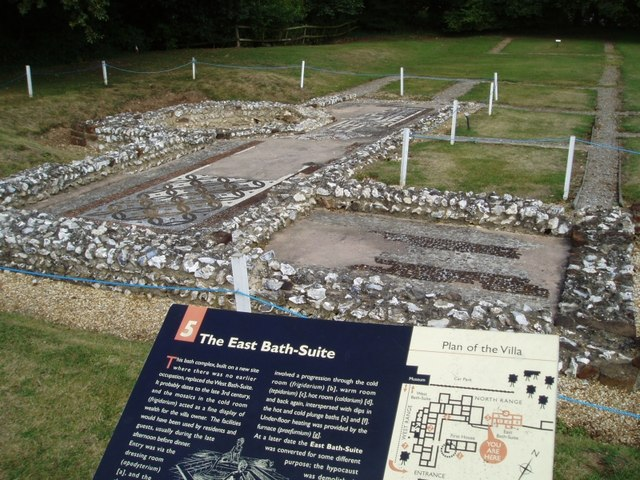
- Rockbourne Roman Villa - East Bath Suite

- Location within Hampshire

General information
- Type: Roman villa
- Location: Rockbourne grid reference SU120170, United Kingdom
- Coordinates: 50.9531°N 1.8304°W
- Construction started: 1st century
- Demolished: 5th century

Website
- Rockbourne Roman Villa

Rockbourne Roman Villa is a Roman courtyard villa excavated and put on public display in the village of Rockbourne in the English county of Hampshire. The villa was discovered in 1942 by a local farmer and excavated by A. T. Morley Hewitt over the next thirty years.

The main structure was a large residence surrounding a courtyard, including luxurious Roman mosaics and bath suites. There were also farm buildings and workshops since it sat at the centre of large farming estate. Its origins lie in the Iron Age and it was occupied until the 5th century. Parts of the villa are on public display and there is a site museum, with excavated artefacts, tracing the villa's history.

== Overview ==
Rockbourne Roman villa is located at West Park, near the village of Rockbourne in Hampshire. It is 5 km northwest of the town of Fordingbridge. The villa once stood in the centre of a large farming estate, and is the largest known villa in the area. The villa was discovered in 1942 by a farmer digging out a ferret, and finding quantities of oyster shells and subsequently a mosaic floor. Recognising the significance of the finds, the land was bought by A. T. Morley Hewitt who conducted excavations every summer from 1956 to 1978.

Early excavators sometimes failed to excavate adequately or make proper records of the finds, which hampered attempts to understand the chronology of the site. Many animal bones and pottery fragments were also discarded during this period. Hampshire County Council bought the site in 1979, and it was the limited re-excavations led by I. P. Horsey during the period 1978-82 which allowed a better understanding of the many changes to the villa over its 400-year history of occupation.

The villa may have formed a pair with a villa discovered at Downton 8 km to the northeast. Rockbourne and Downton may well have controlled extensive pasture land on their respective sides of the River Avon. Excavations approximately 1.5 km to the southeast of Rockbourne at Allen's Farm show that pottery was being produced in kilns during the late 3rd century. Such a close proximity to the villa at Rockbourne suggests that the pottery kilns may have been part of the villa estate.

== History of the Villa ==
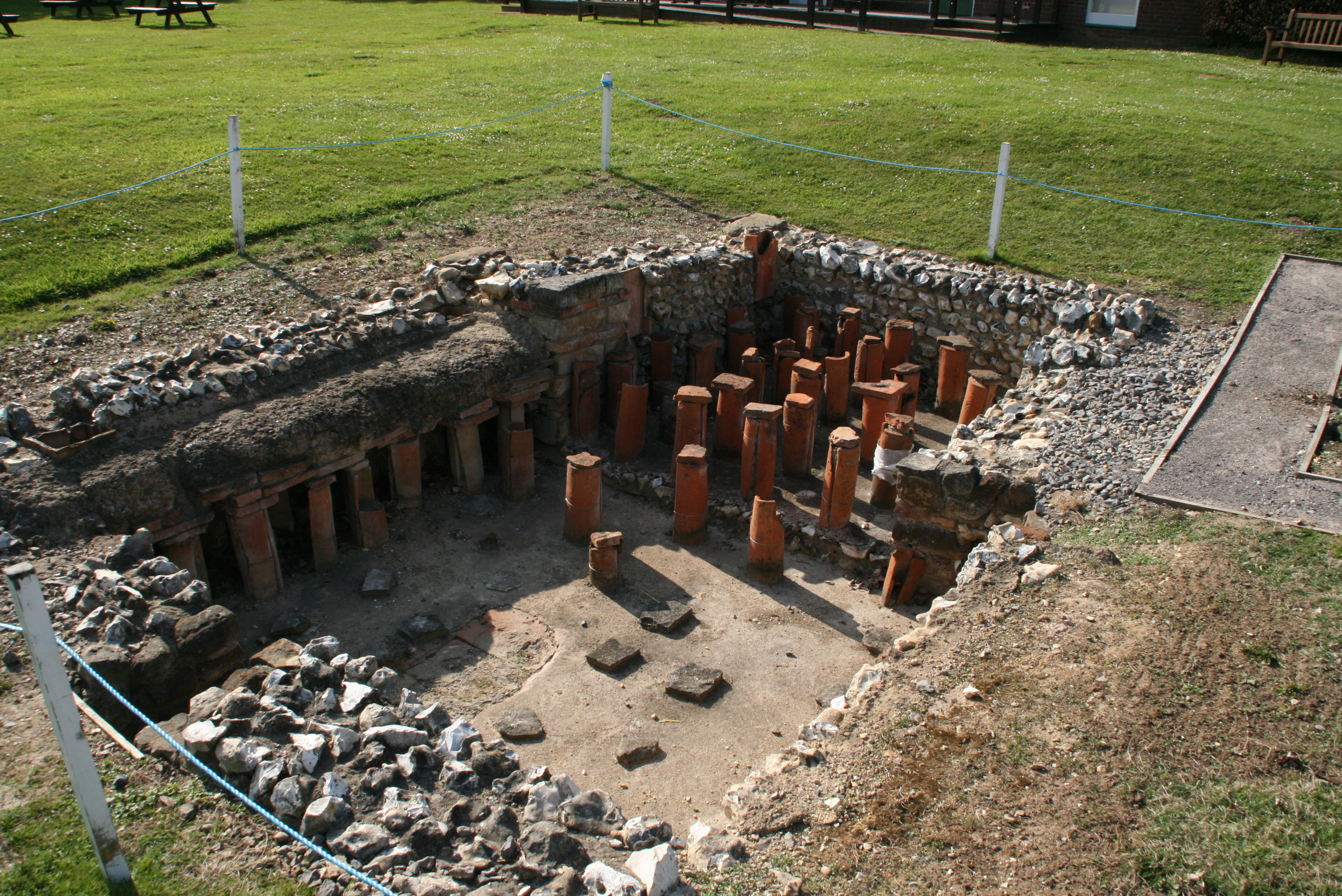
The hypocaust with pilae built from curved roof tiles

=== 1st century ===
Originally the site was occupied by a timber roundhouse with a chalk floor, of a type common in the Late Iron Age. In the 1st century this was replaced by a small rectangular stone house. Adjacent to it, and set well apart, at a right angle, a work-hall was built.

=== 2nd century ===
Around 150 the small house was demolished for a larger building. The new house was a larger row-house consisting of an important middle room with smaller rooms to the north and south of it. The house was aligned with the older work-hall, but kept apart from it. This was the beginning of the west wing. Later in the century a small bath suite was added to this west house. The most unusual feature of this west bath suite is that the pilae in the underfloor hypocaust heating system were built from curved roof tiles (imbrices) rather than from stacks of bricks.

=== 3rd century ===
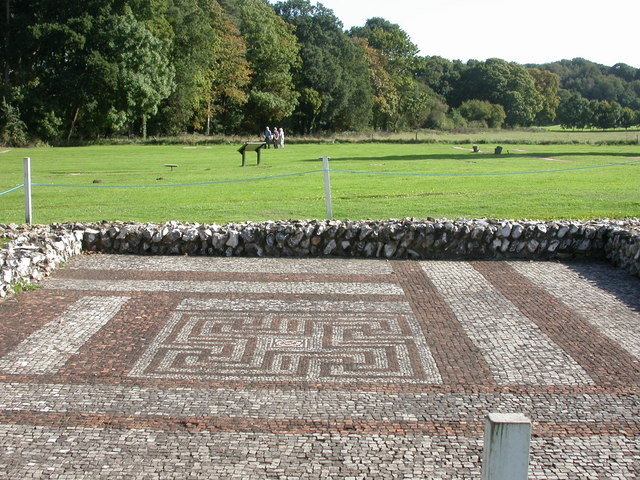
Roman mosaic In the Triclinium (dining room), from the late 3rd century, displaying an intricate swastika decoration

More ranges and buildings were added during the 3rd century creating a courtyard villa. Around 200, a new north wing was built attached to the west wing There may have been a small bath suite in the north wing, but later in the century, a separate, detached, bath house was built on the north wing. The best preserved mosaic floors are in the north wing. The mosaics all have geometric patterns, although none are of especially fine workmanship, and none have figure decoration. At some stage (and the dating is uncertain) the south wing was established, this included an aisled building and a range of work buildings. In 1967 a hoard of 7717 bronze coins was found buried in a pottery jar on the site. The hoard must have been buried around 295, and perhaps suggests that troubled times struck the villa, but the reason why it was never recovered is unknown.

=== 4th century ===
By the 4th century the villa was now a large courtyard villa enclosed on at least three sides. In total there were probably around 40 rooms in use. The house on the north wing was rebuilt in the 4th century. The bath house on the north wing was also remodelled and then apparently taken out of use, and the bath suite in the west house was enlarged and refurbished.

=== Decline ===
By the early 5th century there was a rapid decline in the villa's fortunes. Some of the mosaics were broken up and rudimentary hearths were placed on the floors. Postholes from this period may indicate an attempt to prop up the roofs. Troubled times may also be indicated by the hoard, dating from 394-5, of 16 late Roman gold solidi coins found just 3 km from the site in 1986. The only adult burials found on the site are two which date from the post-Roman period, one of which seems to have been an individual killed by the collapse of the tiled roof.

== The site today ==
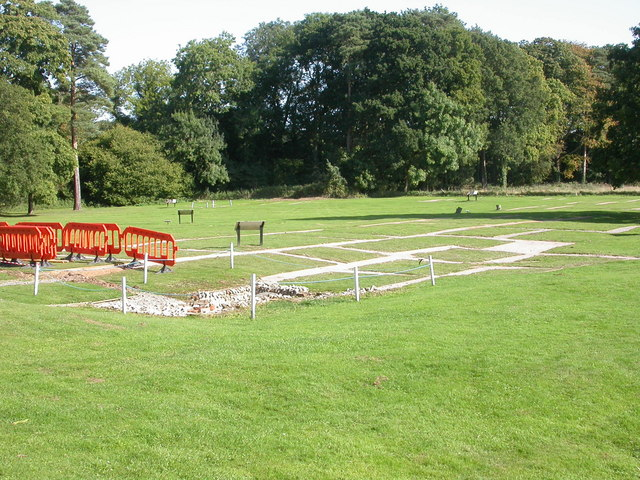
The villa site in 2009

The excavations which took place from 1956 to 1976 were open to visitors, but the site has since been placed in the care of Hampshire County Council, who have backfilled much of the site to prevent deterioration. Many of the finds from the excavations are on view at the on-site museum, with the remainder stored in Winchester. The finds range from New Forest pottery to pieces of animal bone. Of particular interest are two much-damaged Roman milestones found re-used in the building fabric of the villa. One is of Trajan Decius (249-51 AD), and the other of Tetricus II (272 AD). Another major find was a rectangular table or sideboard carved from stone and ornamented with chip-carved decoration on front and sides.

In 2014, ownership of the Villa was transferred to the Hampshire Cultural Trust as part of a larger transfer of museums from Hampshire County Council and Winchester City Council
