= Fordingbridge =

Town in Hampshire, England

Coordinates: 50.9275°N 1.7901°W

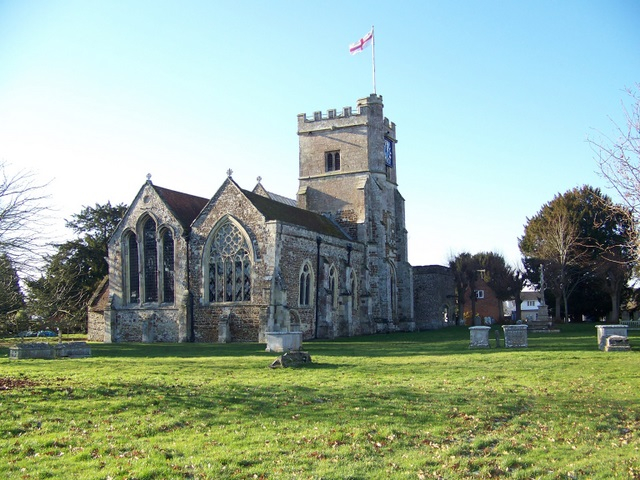
- Church of St Mary the Virgin, Fordingbridge

- Location within Hampshire
- Population: 6,200 (2021 Census)
- OS grid reference: SU148142
- Civil parish: Fordingbridge
- District: New Forest
- Shire county: Hampshire
- Region: South East
- Country: England
- Sovereign state: United Kingdom
- Post town: FORDINGBRIDGE
- Postcode district: SP6
- Dialling code: 01425
- Police: Hampshire and Isle of Wight
- Fire: Hampshire and Isle of Wight
- Ambulance: South Central
- UK Parliament: New Forest West

Fordingbridge is a town and broader civil parish with a population of 6,200 on the River Avon in the New Forest District of Hampshire, England. It is located near the Dorset and Wiltshire borders and on the edge of the New Forest.

It is 81 miles (130 km) southwest of London, and 10 miles (16 km) south of the city of Salisbury. Fordingbridge is a former market town famed for its seven-arch late medieval bridge, which crosses the River Avon at the centre of the town. The Avon Valley Path passes through the town.

Since 1982 Fordingbridge has been twinned with Vimoutiers in Normandy, France.

== Overview ==
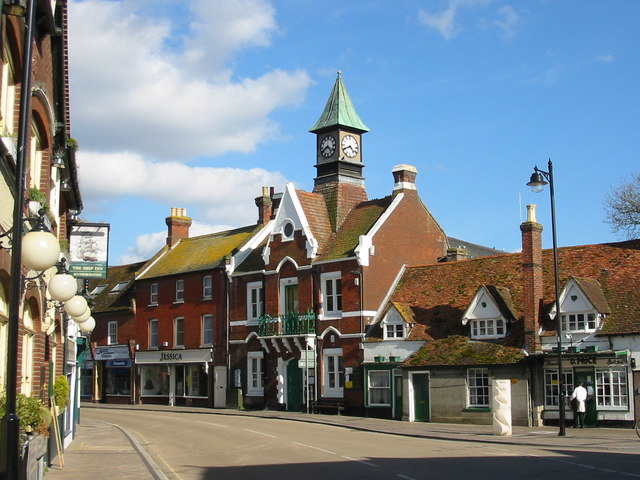
Fordingbridge Town Hall

Known as "The Northern Gateway" to the New Forest, Fordingbridge is popular with tourists, with various campsites, pubs and restaurants, and other tourist facilities locally. The Fordingbridge Museum, which houses many local and New Forest history exhibits, and the Visitor Information Centre are located within King's Yard, Salisbury Street. The town's High Street is well known for its pubs, cafes and local shops. The town also has its own Cinema, within the buildings of a former pottery. Rockbourne Roman Villa is in the nearby village of Rockbourne which sits 3 miles (4.8 km) northwest of Fordingbridge. The village of Breamore is 3 miles north of Fordingbridge and is home to Elizabethan country house, Breamore House.

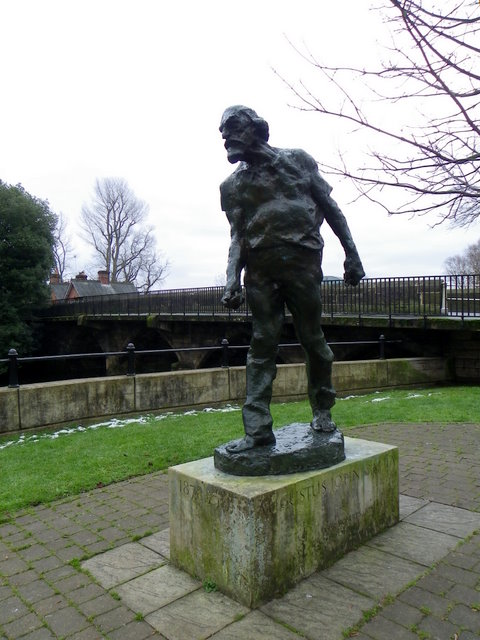
Statue of Augustus John

The Great Bridge, from which the town received its present name, has seven arches and can be seen from the town's large riverside park and recreation ground. The park contains a children's play area, secluded memorial gardens, and large sports playing field. A bronze statue of the painter and former resident Augustus John stands on the banks of the Avon near the Great Bridge.

St. Mary's Church, which has some typical Norman characteristics, is located in the south of the town. The church has a memorial to James Alexander Seton, last British person killed in a duel in England. The town also has a Catholic church in the form of Our Lady of Sorrows and St Philip Benizi. The Building dates from 1874 while the altar dating from 1897 was originally used at Netley Hospital.

Fordingbridge Hospital is a small community hospital built within the grounds of a Victorian workhouse. Most of the older buildings have been redeveloped into private housing, however, the hospital site still houses an inpatient ward, as well as limited outpatients services. Fordingbridge Doctors Surgery is on the same site in Bartons Road. Fordingbridge Hospital was used as a COVID-19 vaccination centre from 2020.

The local comprehensive school is The Burgate School and Sixth Form Centre, in Burgate, a small hamlet to the north of the town.

== Sport ==
Fordingbridge Turks are one of the oldest football clubs in England, established circa 1868. Their unusual name is believed to derive from wishing to emulate the determination shown by Ottoman forces at Siege of Plevna. This has seen them featured on BBC regional television and gain a large social media following. Affiliated to the Hampshire Football Association, the club are run entirely by volunteers and have numerous sides in various age categories. They play their matches at the recreation ground with the men's 1st team now playing in the Southampton League Premier Division. In 1982 they won the Bournemouth Pickford Cup at Dean Court and in 1993 celebrated their 125th anniversary with a prestigious friendly match against Southampton. Their most famous player is Frank Jefferis, who was born in the town and went on to enjoy a successful professional career that saw him play for England.

'The Rec' is also home to Fordingbridge Rugby Club, and Fordingbridge’s weekly Parkrun.

== Geography ==
The parish of Fordingbridge contains the hamlets of Burgate to the north, Criddlestyle to the east, Bickton to the south, and Ashford to the west. Burgate and Bickton are settlements dating back to the time of the Domesday Book, and Bickton was in male heads of households greater than Fordingbridge in 1086. Criddlestyle is an ancient manor, also known as East Mill, with a history dating back to the 14th century. The largest hamlet today is Ashford, which was the location of an ancient watermill, and was also the location of Fordingbridge railway station until it was closed in 1964. The hamlet of Tinkers Cross is a mile northwest of the centre of Fordingbridge.

The villages of Sandleheath, Damerham, Rockbourne, Whitsbury, Breamore, Woodgreen, Godshill, Hyde and Frogham all sit within a 5 mile radius of Fordingbridge and are all within the county of Hampshire. Alderholt is 2 miles southwest of Fordingbridge and is part of Dorset.

Fordingbridge is north of Ringwood and Bournemouth, south of Downton and Salisbury which are all linked by the A338 road.

== History ==
Fordingbridge is recorded in the Domesday Book of 1086 under the name Forde. The manor was held by a certain Robert from "Robert the son of Gerald". Prior to 1066 it had been held by Alwy from King Edward. At the beginning of the 13th century Fordingbridge was held by Hugh de Linguire, who, dying around 1231, left a niece and heir Alice, wife of William de la Falaise. From that date Fordingbridge followed the same descent as Rowner.

The manor was held by Elias de la Falaise at his death in 1254, and his brother William died in possession of the manor in the same year. Before 1277 the property had escheated to the Crown by the felony of William de la Falaise, grandson of William, and was granted in that year to Sir William le Brune, chamberlain to the king. The manor then stayed solidly in the Brune family until the death of Charles Brune in 1769, when the family became extinct in the male line. By his will his estates eventually devolved onto his grand-nephew the Rev. Charles Prideaux-Brune of Prideaux Place, Padstow, Cornwall, and the manor then remained in the possession of the Prideaux-Brune family.

The lord of the manor had a market before 1273: it was held weekly first on Saturday and then on Friday until the middle of the 19th century, when it was discontinued. A fair was held on 9 September. From the 13th to the 15th century Fordingbridge was governed by a bailiff, and then in later centuries by a constable chosen yearly at the court leet of the manor of Lower Burgate. The constable was the chief officer until 1878, when government by Local District Council was established.

A fire in the town on 23 May 1702 destroyed 43 dwelling houses, which were never rebuilt. Fordingbridge Town Hall, built in 1877, is almost in the centre of the town.

Cloth was made here in the 16th century, and in the 19th century there were factories for the manufacture of sailcloth and canvas and the spinning of flax. By 1900 the chief industries of the town were the manufacture of sailcloth and canvas and the making of bricks and tiles, and there were various flour mills, an iron foundry, and the Neave's food works.

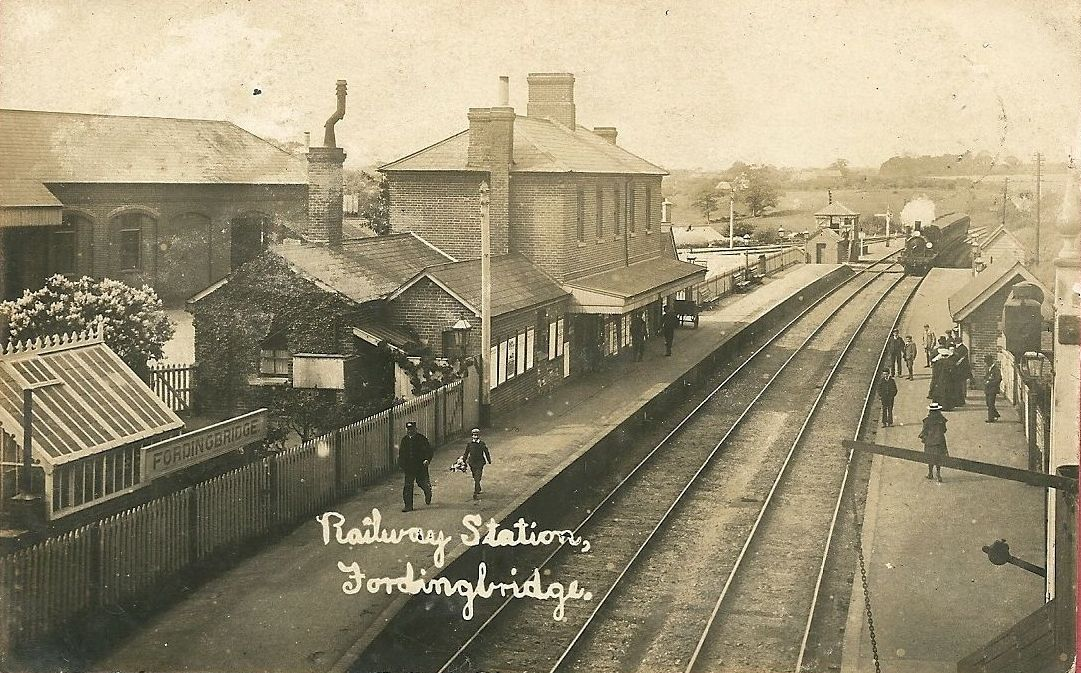
Fordingbridge Railway Station

Fordingbridge railway station was opened in 1866 but closed in 1964. It was originally just outside the town, on the road leading to Sandleheath. Today, the road is still called Station Road; however, the spot where the station once stood is now occupied by a large mill and industrial park. The site is next to the recently reopened 'Railway Hotel'. The Station connected the town with Salisbury to the north and Poole to the south, as part of the Salisbury and Dorset Junction Railway.

== The Great Bridge ==
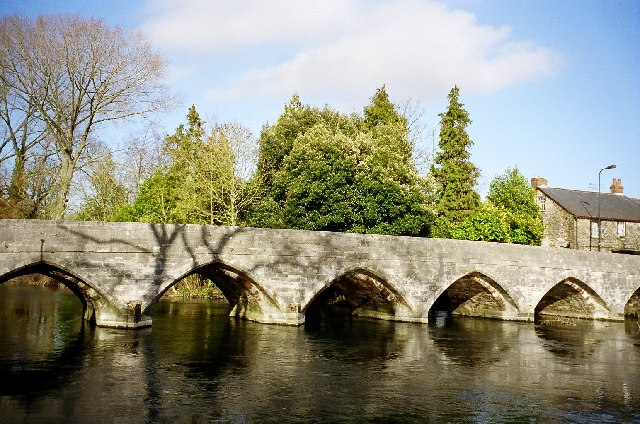
The Great Bridge, viewed from the southwest

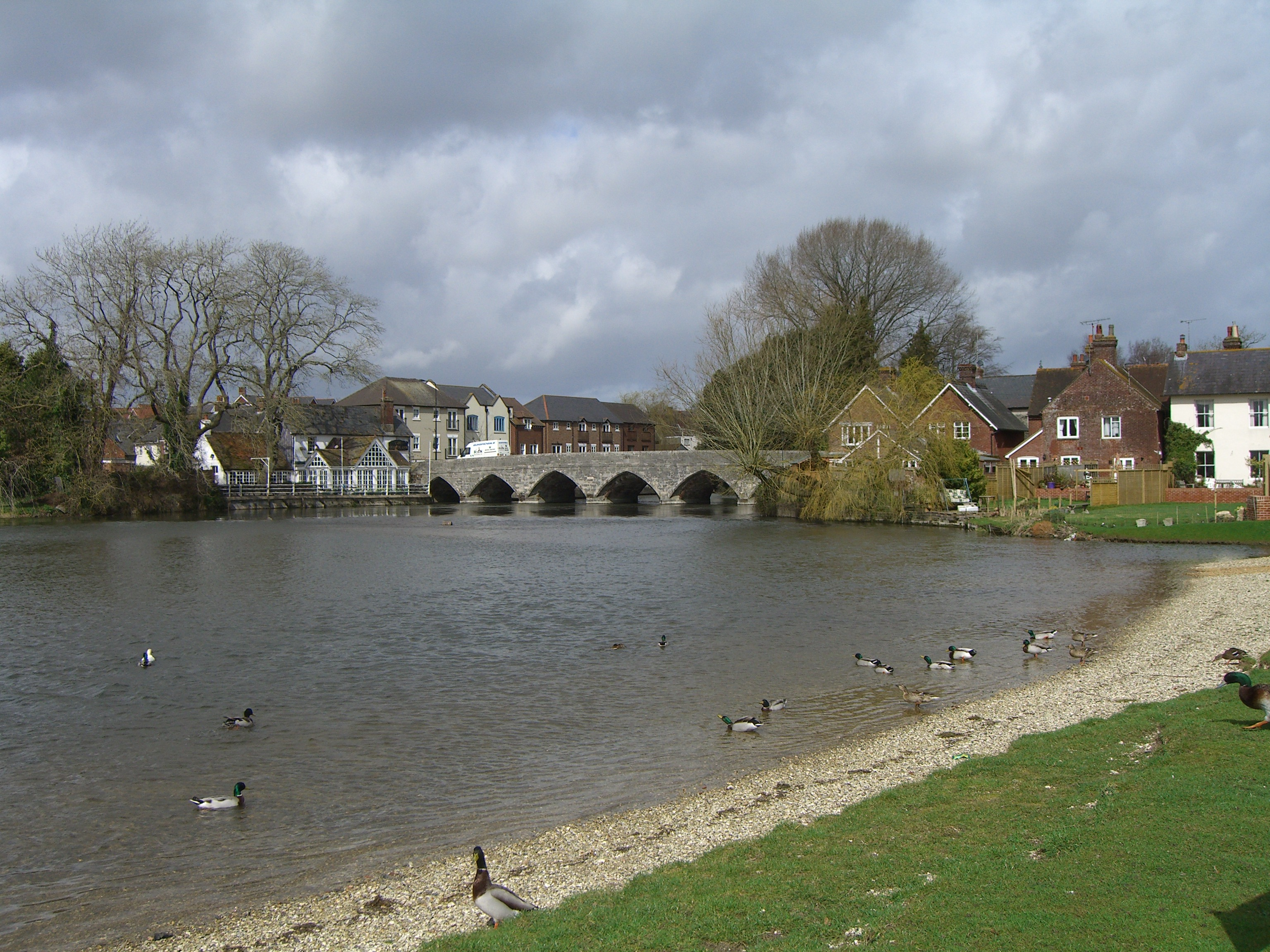
The seven-arched bridge over the River Avon

The first bridge at Fordingbridge was built before 1252, when the bailiff and men of the town received a grant of pontage for one year towards its repairs. Several similar grants followed, the last being dated in 1452. The bridge is 40 metres long and consists of seven stone arches. The bridge brought much traffic through the town. At the east end of the bridge was a Saint John the Baptist Hospital for poor travellers. It was founded 1272, and dissolved 1546; nothing but remnants of the foundation walls remain.

A custom which survived until 1840 obliged the lord of Fordingbridge during one summer month known as "fence month" to keep the bridge guarded and arrest anyone found taking venison from the New Forest. Significant alterations were made in 1841 when both sides were widened, adding 45 cm to the width of the bridge. The original arches are still visible, being smaller in span than the 19th-century additions. A reinforced concrete footpath on one side was added in 1901 to widen the bridge.

== Notable residents ==
- Major General Andrew Hay – British Army officer, born in 1762 and moved to Fordingbridge in 1802 until his death at the Battle of Bayonne in 1814
- William Ernest Brymer - (1840–1909) - politician and a Member of Parliament was born in Fordingbridge.
- Charles Chubb – (1779–1845), an English lock and safe manufacturer
- James Alexander Seton (1816–1845), the last British person killed in a duel in Britain; he is buried at St Mary's Church
- John Charles Durant – (15 July 1846 – 14 December 1929) was an English printer and a Liberal politician
- Augustus John – Welsh portrait artist, born 1878, who lived in Fordingbridge from 1927 until his death in 1961
- Frank Jefferis – (1884–1938), former Southampton, Everton and England footballer
- Neil McCarthy – (26 July 1932 – 5 Feb 1985), was an English actor
- Anne-Marie Mallik – born 1952, former child actress, portrayed Alice in Alice in Wonderland (1966 TV play)
- Paul Kidby – artist, born 1964, best known for his art based on Terry Pratchett's Discworld, lives and works in Fordingbridge
- Daniel O'Mahony – writer, born 1973
- David Oakes – actor, born 1983
