= Ceramic building material =

Archaeological term for baked clay building material

Ceramic building material, often abbreviated to CBM, is an umbrella term used in archaeology to cover all building materials made from baked clay. It is particularly, but not exclusively, used in relation to Roman building materials.

It is a useful and necessary term because, especially when initially found in archaeological excavation, it may be difficult to distinguish, for example, fragments of bricks from fragments of roofing or flooring tiles. However, ceramic building materials are usually readily distinguishable from fragments of ceramic pottery by their rougher finish.

== See also ==
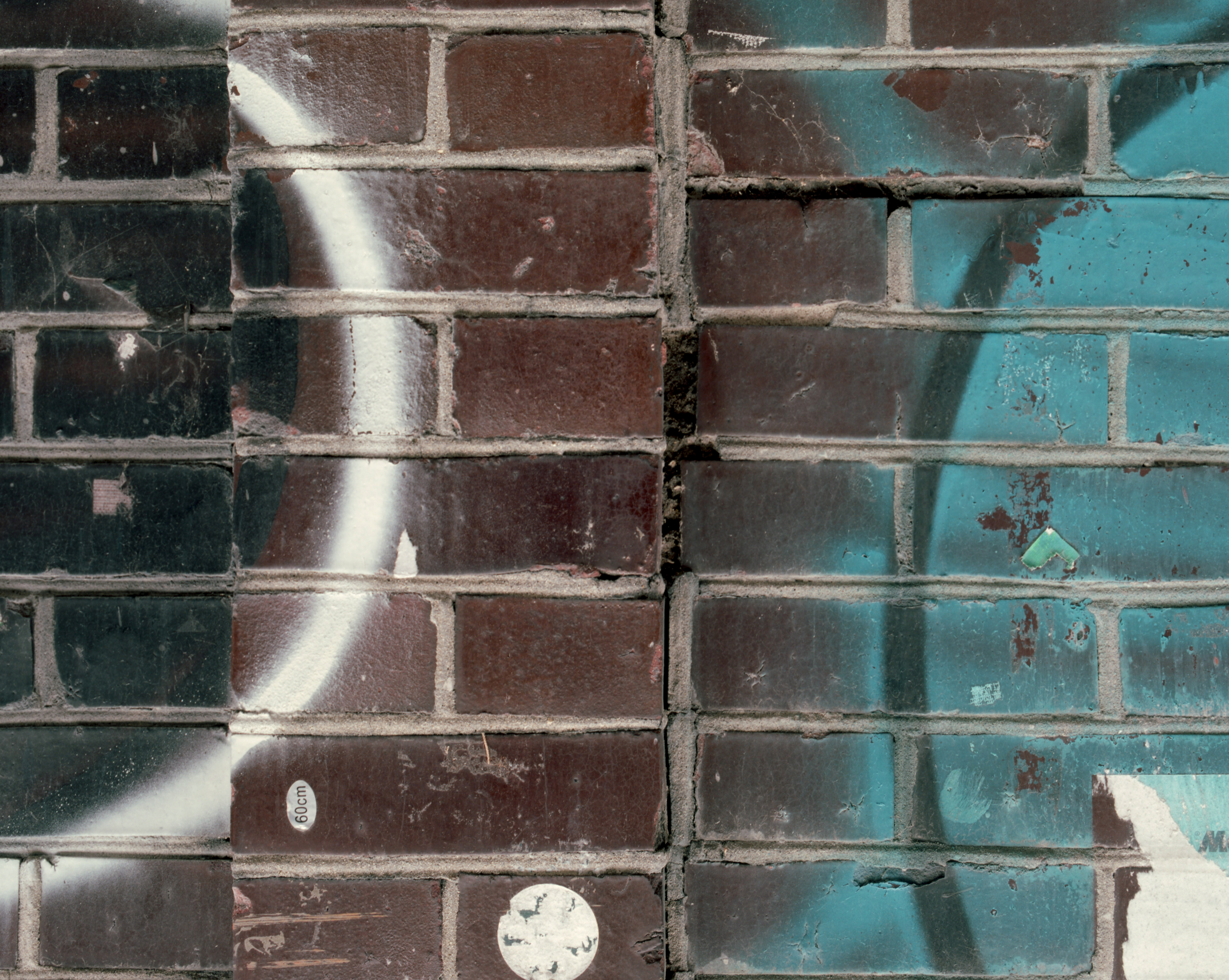
A typical brick wall.

- Adobe – Building material of earth and organic materials
- Antefix – Terminal block for the covering tiles of a roof
- Architectural terracotta – Fired clay construction material
- Brick – Block or a single unit of a ceramic material used in masonry construction
- Brickwork – Masonry made of bricks and mortar
- Clay – Fine grained natural soil
- Cob (material) – Building material made of soil and fiber
- Imbrex and tegula, also known as Roman roofing tiles – Overlapping roof tiles used in ancient Greek and Roman architecture
- Mudbrick – Earth blocks for construction
- Palmette – Decorative motif based on the fan-shaped leaves of a palm tree
- Pilae stacks – Tiles used to support a floor over a hypocaust
- Roman brick – Style of brick used in Ancient Roman architecture
- Tile – Manufactured pieces for covering surfaces
