= James Alexander Seton =

Scottish cavalry officer killed in a duel

- Born: c. 1816; Fordingbridge, Hampshire, England
- Died: 2 June 1845 (aged 28-29); Portsmouth
- Cause of death: Infected gunshot wound
- Resting place: St Mary's Church, Fordingbridge; 50.92078°N 1.79509°W
- Occupation: None
- Known for: Last British person killed in a duel on English soil
- Spouse: Anne Susannah Wakefield (1838–1845, his death)
- Children: One
- Parent(s): Colonel James Seton, Margaret Findlater
- Military career
- Allegiance: United Kingdom
- Branch: British Army
- Service years: 1837–1838
- Rank: Cornet

James Alexander Seton (c. 1816 – 2 June 1845) was the last British person to be killed in a duel on British soil.

== Early life ==
James Alexander Seton was born in Fordingbridge, Hampshire, in 1816, the son of Colonel James Seton and Margaret Findlater. He was of Scottish descent, being a descendant of the Earls of Dunfermline. His grandfather was Vice-Admiral James Seton, governor of St Vincent in the Caribbean. Thanks to inherited money, he was a wealthy man with no need to work for a living.

Seton served briefly as a cavalry officer. In March 1837 he purchased the rank of cornet. He served until March 1838 and was attached to the 3rd, 11th and 12th Light Dragoons. He never attained a higher rank and his short military career ended around six years before the duel. Despite this he is styled "Captain Seton" in some histories of the event.

He married Anne Susannah Wakefield in May 1838 and they had one child, Marion Frances.

== The quarrel ==
Some time during the early 1840s James and Susannah Seton rented rooms in Southsea, Portsmouth, Hampshire. In May 1845, James Seton met Isabella Hawkey, the wife of Lieutenant Henry Hawkey, an officer of the Royal Marines. Seton began a pursuit of Isabella, visiting her at her lodgings when her husband was absent and offering gifts. Henry Hawkey heard rumours of this and forbade his wife to see Seton.

On 19 May 1845, the Hawkeys and James Seton attended a ball in the King's Rooms, Southsea, a gathering that was held weekly. There, James danced with Isabella. There was an altercation in which Hawkey openly insulted Seton, calling him a "blaggard and a scoundrel".

== Duel and death ==
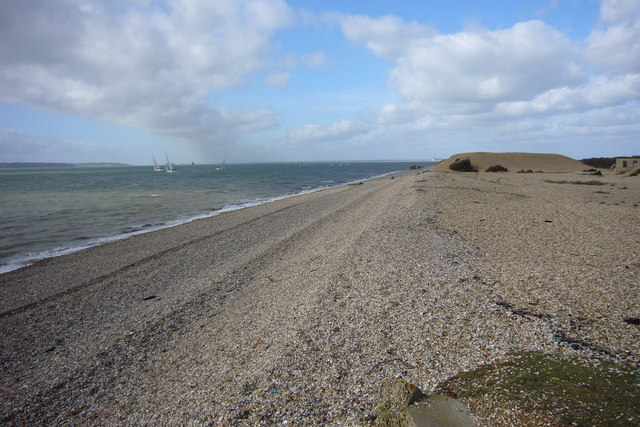
The beach at Browndown (2007), the scene of the duel

Early the next morning, Hawkey was visited in his lodgings by a half-pay naval officer, Lieutenant Rowles. Acting as Seton's second, Rowles issued Hawkey with a formal challenge to a duel. Hawkey later visited a gunsmith's shop with a shooting gallery where he briefly practised shooting. Later, he bought a new pair of duelling pistols from another shop, claiming to the shopkeeper he needed them for a shooting match. In the afternoon he returned to the shooting gallery and fired three shots with them.

The duel took place that evening on the beach at Browndown, near Gosport. Seton and Rowles travelled there by a small yacht, Hawkey and his second, Royal Marine Lieutenant Charles Lawes Pym, travelled separately. No other people were present even though it was customary for a doctor or surgeon to be in attendance at duels; both parties were likely anxious to keep the affair secret to avoid intervention by the authorities.

After the seconds had measured out fifteen paces, the duellists took their pistols and fired. Seton's shot missed; Hawkey's pistol was half-cocked and failed to fire. By the rules of duelling, the affair could have honourably ended then. However, Hawkey insisted on a second exchange of shots. This time Seton was struck down by a bullet which hit him in the right hip.

The wounded man was carried onto the yacht and a doctor was summoned. He was taken the short distance to Portsmouth by sea. He was taken to the Quebec Hotel and eventually operated on by the eminent London surgeon Robert Liston. The surgery appeared to go well, but signs of an infection soon became apparent and Seton's condition quickly began to deteriorate. He died on 2 June 1845.

== Aftermath ==
An inquest began on 4 June at the Portsmouth Guildhall. Seton's body (described as very decayed) was present on the first day of the proceedings. But on the second day the Coroner gave permission for it to be buried. The inquest was ajourned on the 6th, and recommenced on 17 June. The inquest jury returned a verdict of wilful murder against Henry Hawkey and Charles Lawes Pym and a warrant was issued for the arrest of both men.

Seton was buried next to his father at St Mary's Church, Fordingbridge on the 10 June, after a funeral procession from Southsea to Fordingbridge. His funeral was a significant local event; it passed through the town of Ringwood where nearly all the shops were closed as a mark of respect. At Fordingbridge, the shops were also closed and many of the inhabitants joined the funeral procession. A memorial to James Seton was placed inside the church, where it can be still seen.

Around nine months after the duel, in March 1846, Lieutenant Pym was charged as an accessory for murder at Winchester assizes, but was acquitted. His involvement in the duel had little apparent effect on his military career, which was long and successful. He eventually reached the rank of general.

Henry Hawkey was tried for murder on 13 June 1846 at the summer session of Winchester assizes. Defended by Alexander Cockburn QC, he was found not guilty after Cockburn delivered a two-hour speech to the jury, in which he claimed Hawkey had been deeply provoked by Seton's conduct to his wife, and that Seton's death was largely caused by the medical treatment he had received.

George Rowles, Seton's second in the duel, was not charged. He continued to serve in the Royal Navy until at least 1859.

The last fatal duel in the United Kingdom took place some seven years later, on 19 October 1852, at Priest Hill, between Englefield Green and Old Windsor. It was fought by two French political refugees, Lieutenant Frederic Constant Cournet and Emmanuel Barthélemy. Cournet was killed and Barthélemy was tried for murder. However, he was convicted only of manslaughter and sentenced to a few months in prison. In 1855, Barthélemy was hanged after killing his employer and another man.
