= Whitsbury Castle =

Iron Age hillfort in Hampshire, England

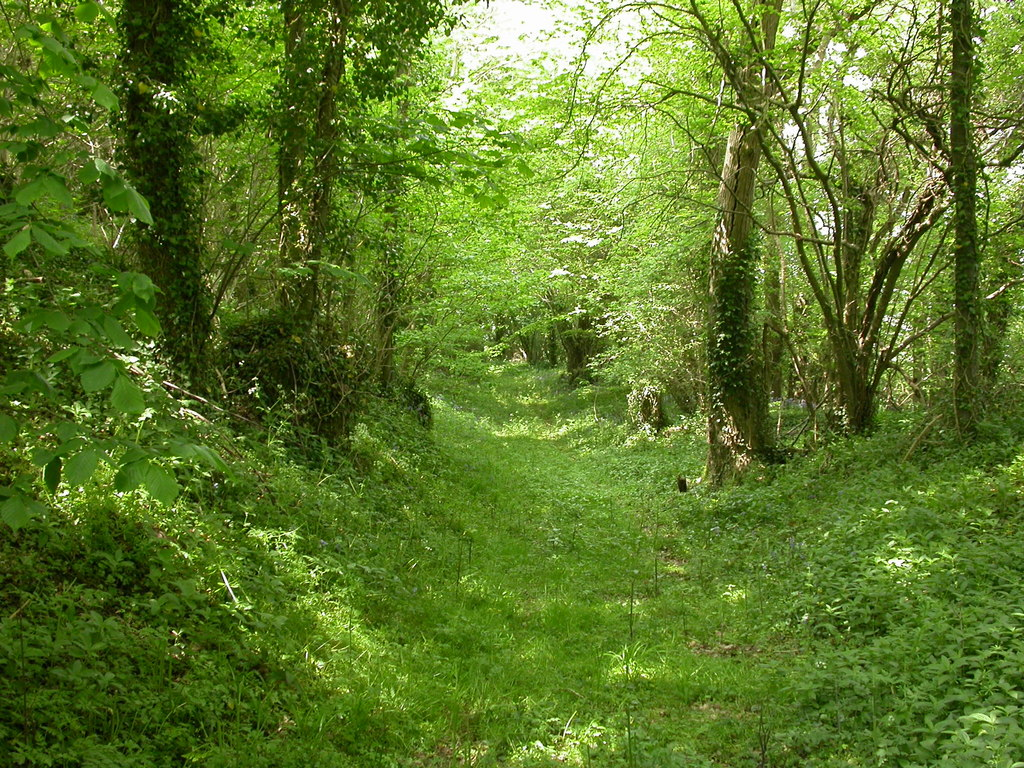
- The outermost ditch of Whitsbury Castle

- Location within Hampshire
- 50.9760°N 1.8193°W
- Periods: Iron Age
- Location: Hampshire

Site notes
- Area: 16 acres (6.5 ha)
- Public access: on private land

Whitsbury Castle, or Whitsbury Castle Ditches, is the site of an Iron Age univallate hillfort located near the village of Whitsbury in Hampshire. The fort is roughly pear-shaped, located on a chalk outcrop, and covering approximately sixteen acres. The defenses comprise two large ramparts with outer ditches and an additional counter scarp bank on the northern half. The original entrance was at the southwestern corner but has been destroyed by the construction of a post-medieval manor house. The site has been in use throughout the ages, with excavation revealing mesolithic activity, an association with a Bronze Age ranch boundary, an Iron Age hillfort settlement, followed much later by Anglo-Saxon renovation and reuse of the defences. The site is privately owned but is flanked externally on all sides but east by public bridleways.

The site was designated a scheduled monument in 1925, giving it protection and recognition as a nationally important archaeological site.

== Location ==
The site is located at grid reference SU127196, and to the north of the village of Whitsbury, in the county of Hampshire. The site lies at a level of 115m to 120 AOD.

== See also ==
- List of places in Hampshire
- List of hill forts in England
- List of hill forts in Scotland
- List of hill forts in Wales
