= Edgar Downs =

English painter

- Born: 12 October 1876
- Died: 1963 (aged 86–87)
- Education: Academy of Fine Arts, Munich
- Known for: Painting

Edgar Downs, ROI, (1876–1963) was a British painter, known for painting agricultural scenes.

Downs was born on 12 October 1876 at Claughton, Birkenhead, the son of William Downs. He was educated at Birkenhead School and the Academy of Fine Arts, Munich, and received a silver medal there.

He exhibited paintings called Our Daily Bread and The Edge of the Bog at the Royal Academy in 1911, when his address was given as 12 Bedford Gardens, Kensington, London. His other addresses included Arun House at Clymping, West Sussex, and latterly Mudeford, Hampshire where he died.

During World War I, he served as a war artist, including spells at Gallipoli in 1915 and Salonica in 1916. He was assigned to the 1st County of London Yeomanry in July 1918. One of his paintings made at this time hangs in the Headquarters of the Inns of Court & City Yeomanry.

Two of his works, Gathering Kelp (1914) and Cattle Ploughing in an Open Landscape (c. 1914), are in the collection of Fordingbridge Town Council at Fordingbridge Town Hall.

He was a member of the Royal Institute of Oil Painters ("ROI"), the London Sketch Club and Chelsea Arts Club.

In addition to the RA, ROI, and London Sketch Club, he exhibited at Royal Cambrian Academy of Art and the Walker Gallery.
