= Henry Charles Moorhead Hawkey =

British lieutenant (1820–1859)

Henry Charles Moorhead Hawkey (c. 1820, India – 1859, Cricklewood, London, United Kingdom) was a lieutenant in the Royal Marines who took part in the last fatal duel between Englishmen on English soil in 1845.

== Early life ==
Hawkey was born in India in about 1820 but came from an old Cornish family. Aged 16, he joined the Royal Marines in 1836 and served in the Mediterranean. By age of 20 in 1840, he was promoted to first lieutenant. In August of the same year he married Isabella Colley, the daughter of a senior Marines officer.

== Duel ==
In 1843 Hawkey was posted to the Marines base at Portsmouth, and in May 1845 he and his wife made the acquaintance of James Alexander Seton, a wealthy former cavalry officer. Seton proceeded to try to seduce Isabella. When Hawkey heard about it he confronted Seton in private at a ball and heated words were exchanged. However, Seton refused to meet Hawkey in a duel. Hawkey therefore publicly insulted Seton, leaving him little option, by the standards of the day, but to issue his own challenge. His second, Lieutenant Byrom Rowles, RN, brought the challenge to Hawkey early the following morning. Hawkey and his second, fellow Marine Lieutenant Edward Lawes Pym, arrived at the appointed place late in the afternoon: a remote spot on the beach near Gosport, Hampshire.

At the first exchange of fire Seton missed but Hawkey's pistol failed to fire. Second pistols were issued and Seton missed again but was hit by Hawkey's shot. The ball entered his hip and travelled through his lower abdomen. He was removed for medical aid, but later died from an infected wound.

Hawkey and Pym fled and were not seen again till the following year, when both handed themselves over to the authorities for trial. Despite overwhelming evidence, both were acquitted. Pym went on to have a successful career in the Marines, but for Hawkey things went downhill.

On 26 April 1852, he attacked a fellow officer who was having an affair with his wife, and this time she was a willing participant. Hawkey was court martialled, and although partially cleared was soon afterwards removed from his post. His marriage was destroyed, he fell into debt, and died of tuberculosis in London seven years after his court martial, aged 39.
