= The Burgate School and Sixth Form =

The Burgate School

Location
- Salisbury Road; Fordingbridge, Hampshire, SP6 1EZ; England; 50.937°N 1.787°W

Information
- Type: Academy
- Established: 1957
- Department for Education URN: 136719 Tables
- Ofsted: Reports
- Headteacher: David Pover
- Gender: Coeducational
- Age: 11 to 18
- Website: https://www.theburgate.com/

The Burgate School and Sixth Form (opened in 1957) is an 11–18 academy school. The school is situated in Fordingbridge, Hampshire, and at the current time has approximately 1000 students. The school achieves results above the national average at all levels. GCSE results in 2018 were significantly improved on previous years with a Progress 8 score which ranked the school third in Hampshire.

== Ofsted inspections ==
The school was last inspected by Ofsted in May 2019: the inspection report judged the school to be 'Good' overall with 'Outstanding' features. Three inspection judgements were 'Outstanding': Effectiveness of leadership and management; Personal development, behaviour and welfare; and 16 to 19 study programmes. Two inspection judgements were 'Good': Quality of teaching, learning and assessment and Outcomes for pupils. Ofsted recognised how the board of trustees and staff work closely together which has resulted in a consistent and positive learning environment, where teaching is inspirational. The inspection also recognised that the school provides its students with a holistic and well-rounded education, where academic success and personal development are equally valued.

In November 2024, another inspection was taken; results are not yet given.

== Staff ==
The previous headteacher, Celia Nicholls, first joined the school as a teacher in 1983, from Ansford School, Castle Cary, and became headteacher in 1988. She announced her resignation at the end of the 2009/10 academic year; after that David Pover was appointed as headteacher.

== History ==
- 1957: Founded in January as a secondary modern school, under the name "Fordingbridge County Secondary School". Ralph Labdon, Headteacher.
- 1962: Name changed to "The Burgate County Secondary School".
- 1967: Ralph Labdon retires and is replaced by David Benfield.
- 1980: Following county reorganisation into the comprehensive system, the school re-opened in September as "The Burgate School" with comprehensive status.
- 1981: David Benfield retires as Headteacher, and is replaced by Alan Hollands.
- 1988: Alan Hollands is succeeded by Deputy Head Celia Nicholls. Deputy Head, Ian Kirby, also joined the school.
- 1994: New drama block and science facilities opened by Murray Walker.
- 1995: New sixth form centre opened by Esther Rantzen and Desmond Wilcox.
- 2000: Extension to the Sixth Form.
- 2006: School granted specialist status in Humanities (English, Geography and History).
- 2008: New Sixth Form building completed and opened by Esther Rantzen.
- 2010: David Pover is appointed as Headteacher.
- 2011: Academy Status granted and name changed to 'The Burgate School and Sixth Form'.
