= St Mary's Church, Fordingbridge =

Church in Fordingbridge, Hampshire, England

Coordinates: 50.9236°N 1.7949°W

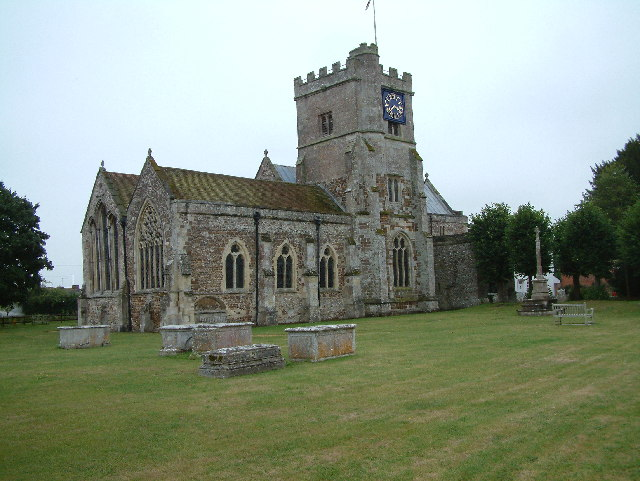
St Mary the Virgin, Fordingbridge

St Mary's Church, Fordingbridge is a 12th–13th-century church in Hampshire, England. A Grade I listed building, it was restored in the 19th century.

== History ==
A church is mentioned in the Domesday Book in 1086. It was rebuilt by the Normans around 1150 and would then have been an open space internally. The north chapel and north and south aisles were added around 1230. Within another 100 years the clerestory had been added, the tower raised (in modern times housing 8 bells plus a Sanctus bell), and the north chapel extended. The chapel has a straight tie beam truss roof of chestnut that masquerades as a hammerbeam roof.

Lands in Fordingbridge and the advowson of the church were granted to King's College, Cambridge in 1447 by Henry VI, after being given to the Crown by Humphrey, Duke of Buckingham.

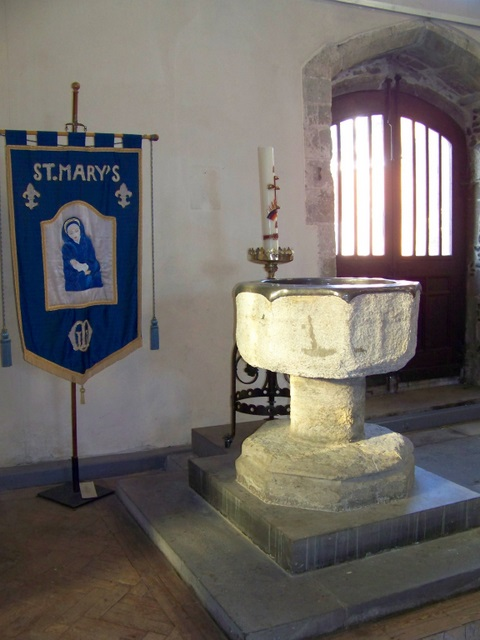
The font, thought to be early 14th century

Externally the church has changed little since the 16th century, although originally the exterior flint work would have been plastered as at one of its neighbours, St Mary, Breamore. Internally the church looks much as it did after the 1840 renovation except for the addition of the organ in 1887 and the reredos in 1920. The church was restored between 1901 and 1903 under the direction of Charles Ponting.

The church once had a "three-decker" pulpit, but this has been removed. In very recent years the Victorian pews were replaced by chairs to facilitate using the space much more flexibly. In 2000 a new window was commissioned in the south aisle to commemorate the millennium. Also, two of the bells were sent to the Whitechapel Bell Foundry to be recast and re-tuned.

== Vicarages ==
There are two surviving vicarages in Fordingbridge, the imposing residence opposite the west front, built in 1817 and now converted to apartments, and the current, more modern building opposite the south side.

== Churchyard ==
The churchyard has a monument to the safe-building family of Chubb, and also a memorial to the last British man killed in a duel in England, James Alexander Seton. Along with all the town burial sites (except the new Catholic burial ground), St Mary's churchyard was closed in 1896 and replaced by the new cemetery at Stuckton Road. In modern times the churchyard has been cleared to allow easier maintenance, and many of the gravestones now form the path from the lichgate to the north porch. The original locations of some of the stones and the owners of some worn stones can be deduced from the Fordingbridge sexton's register, which covers the period from 1730.

== Services ==
The church choir can usually be heard every Sunday supporting services such as the Family Communion, with traditional Evensong on the third and fourth Sunday evenings each month. There is an annual Patronal Festival on the first weekend in July.
