= Fordingbridge Town Hall =

Municipal building in Fordingbridge, Hampshire, England

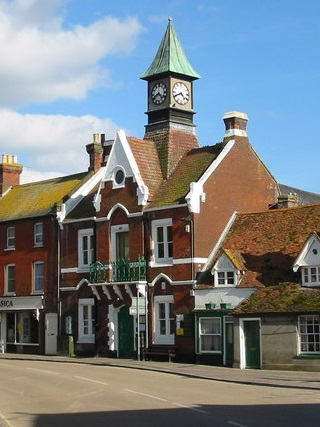
- Fordingbridge Town Hall

- Shown in Hampshire
- 50.9265°N 1.7921°W
- Location: High Street, Fordingbridge

History
- Built: 1877

Site notes
- Architectural style: Gothic Revival style

Listed Building – Grade II
- Official name: Town Hall, Market Place
- Designated: 13 February 1987
- Reference no.: 1094875

Fordingbridge Town Hall is a municipal building in the High Street in Fordingbridge, Hampshire, England. The structure, which is the meeting place of Fordingbridge Town Council, is a Grade II listed building.

== History ==
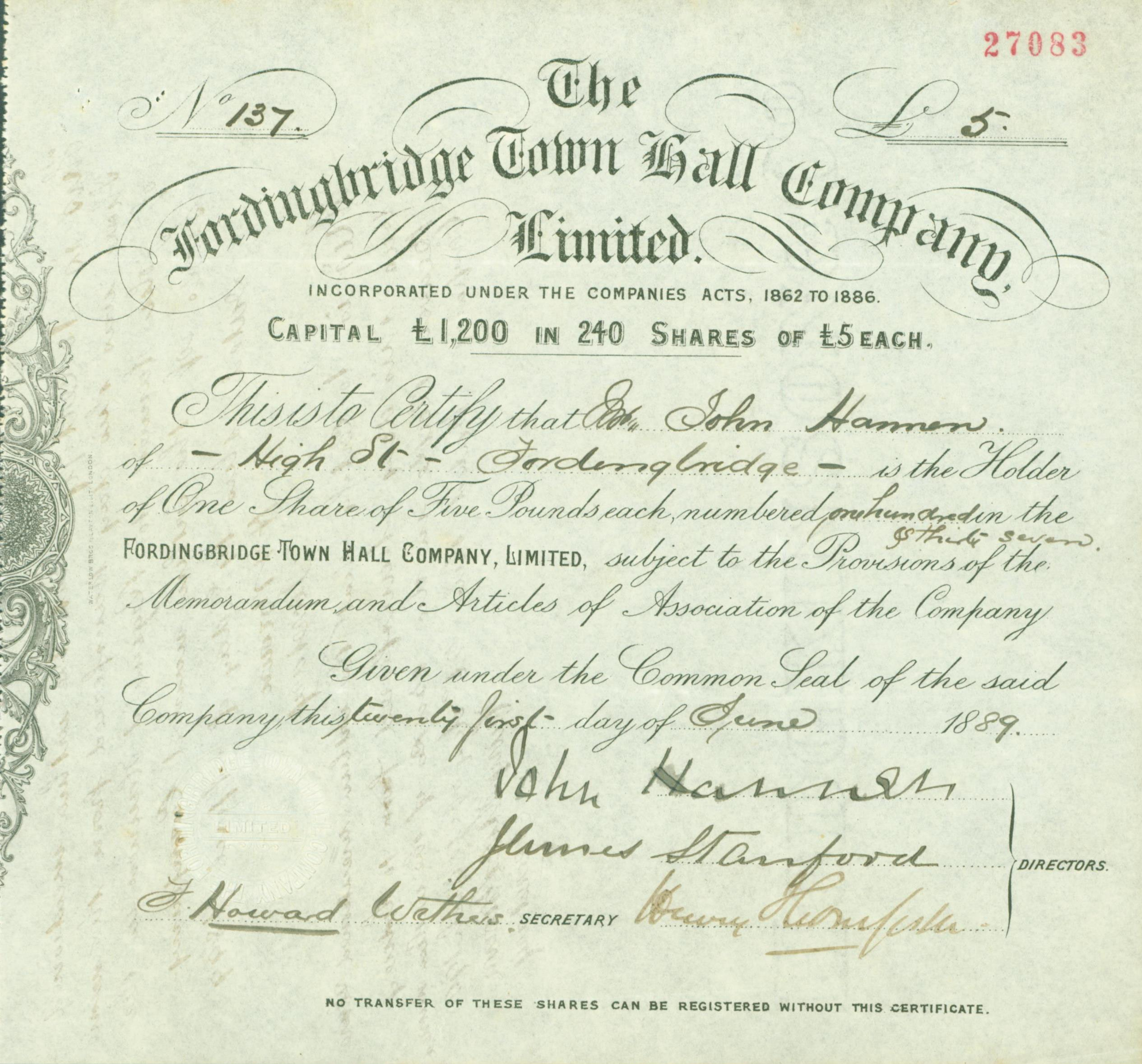
Share of the Bordingbridge Town Hall Company Ltd., issued 21 June 1889

The building was commissioned by the Loyal New Forest Lodge of the Ancient Order of Oddfellows as their meeting place: the site they selected was almost in the centre of the town. It was designed in the Gothic Revival style, built in red brick with stone dressings and was completed in 1877. The design involved a symmetrical main frontage with three bays facing onto the High Street; the central bay featured an arched doorway with a stone surround surmounted by five brackets supporting a cast iron balcony. On the first floor, there was a French door with a date stone set in the lintel and, at attic level, there was a gable containing an oculus. The outer bays were fenestrated by pairs of sash windows with stone surrounds and, at roof level, there was a clock tower, with a pyramid-shaped roof. (The clock, made by Elisha Tucker of Bloomsbury in 1879, chimed the Westminster Quarters on a set of hemispherical bells within the turret.) Internally, the principal rooms were the main hall on the ground floor and the council chamber on the first floor.

Shortly after completion of the building, ownership of the structure was transferred to a company which had been specially formed by local businessmen and was known as the Fordingbridge Town Hall Company. The town had historically been administered by the local constable, an appointee of the court leet, which itself was presided over by John Constable, lord of the manor of Nether Burgate. Following abolition of the office of constable in 1878, an elected parish council established and, after ownership of the building had been transferred to the parish council, the Fordingbridge Town Hall Company was liquidated in March 1931.

During the Second World War, the building was requisitioned by the War Office but it was returned to the parish council in 1953. It was used by the parish council as a meeting place and also as a cinema and a venue for theatre performances and concerts. A small local history museum was also established in the town hall: significant archaeological items in the collection included a palstave which had been found at Alderholt in Dorset. Following local government re-organisation in 1974, the parish council was renamed Fordingbridge Town Council; the council continued to use the town hall as its regular meeting place.

Works of art in the town hall include landscape paintings by the artist, Edgar Downs, entitled Gathering Kelp (1914) and Cattle Ploughing in an Open Landscape (c. 1914).
