= Knoll Camp =

Iron Age hillfort in Hampshire, England

- Damerham Knoll
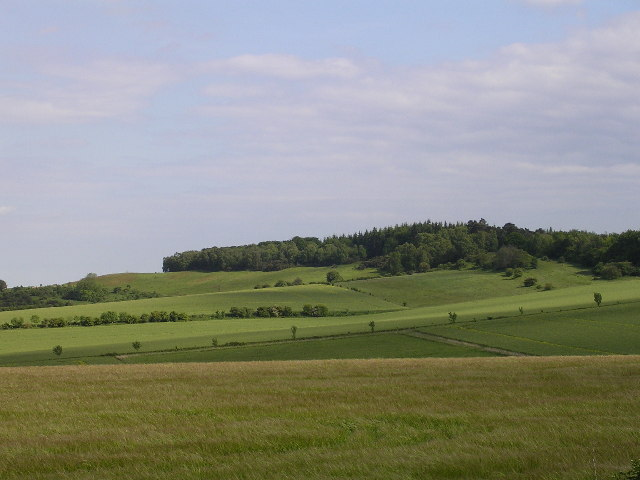

- Location within Hampshire
- 50.9660°N 1.8599°W
- Periods: Iron Age
- Location: Hampshire

Site notes
- Area: 4 acres (1.6 ha)
- Public access: Yes

Knoll Camp, or Damerham Knoll, is the site of an Iron Age univallate hill fort located in Hampshire. The fort comprises a circular earthwork containing about four acres. There is a single ditch with inner rampart and traces of counter scarp bank. The site is a scheduled ancient monument no.118. Grim's Ditch also runs throughout this area. The footpath/bridleway from the nearby long barrows of Grans Barrow and Knap Barrow runs southeast along the ridge through the centre of the hill fort, leaving through the original SE entrance, and you could easily miss the ditch and bank as you cross it. The interior is thickly wooded and brambled.

There is also a probable Iron Age Cross Ridge close by, described as Damerham Knoll, 50m west of Knoll Camp and comprises a shallow ditch with fragmentary remains of a bank on the west side. grid reference SU098185

== Location ==
The site is located at grid reference SU099185, to the west of the village of Rockbourne in the county of Hampshire. The hill has a summit of 132m AOD.
