= Pilae stacks =

Tiles used to support a floor over a hypocaust

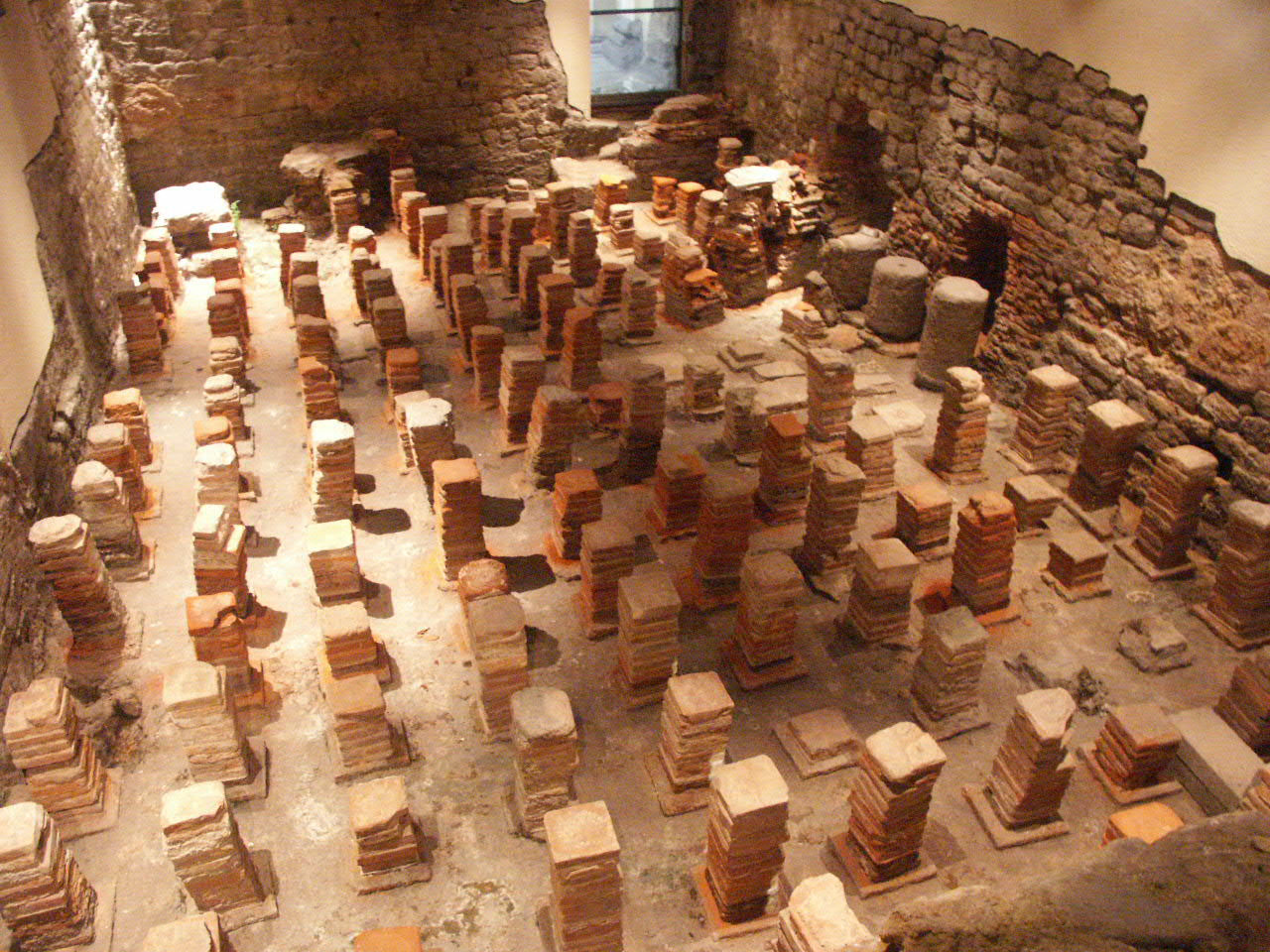
Pilae stacks in the Roman Baths at Bath, England.

Pilae stacks are stacks of pilae tiles, square or round tiles, that were used in Roman times as an element of the underfloor heating system, common in Roman bathhouses, called the hypocaust. The concept of the pilae stacks is that the floor is constructed at an elevated position, allowing air to freely circulate underneath and up, through the hollow bricks, into the structure walls. Examples of such baths are found not only in Rome, but also in distant parts of the Roman Empire such as Roman Britain, or Chellah, in modern-day Morocco.

This architectural technique was the first form of underfloor heating and the same principle is still used today.

== See also ==
- Ceramic building material – Archaeological term for baked clay building material
- Thermae, also known as Roman baths – Public facilities for bathing in ancient Rome
- Suspensura – Pier of bricks to support a floor over a hypocaust
