= Fordingbridge Hospital =

- Southern Health NHS Foundation Trust
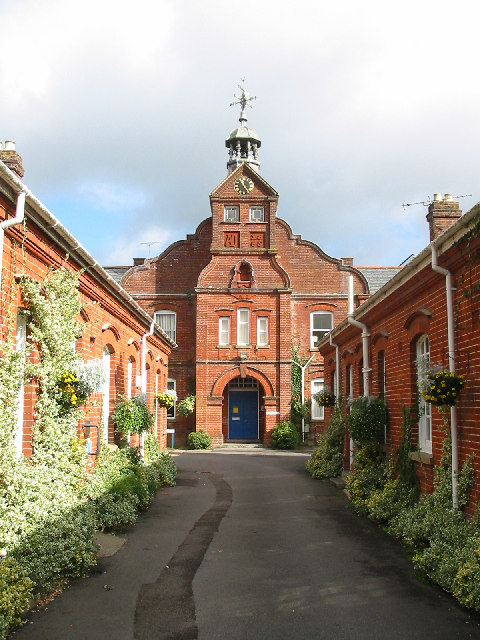
- Entrance showing Victorian part of hospital

- Location in Hampshire

Geography
- Location: Bartons Road Fordingbridge, Hampshire, England
- Coordinates: 50.92752°N 1.79292°W

Organisation
- Care system: NHS
- Type: Community with out-patients department

Services
- Emergency department: No
- Beds: 21

History
- Founded: 1885

Links
- Lists: Hospitals in England

Fordingbridge Hospital is a small community hospital in Fordingbridge, Hampshire, England. The hospital closed to admissions in September 2023.

== History ==
The hospital has its origins in the Union Workhouse built on a site on Bartons Road in 1885. (Note: Replacing an earlier workhouse in Shaftesbury Road that had been destroyed by fire) The site cost a little over £9,000 and the buildings were erected in the Queen Anne style. In the 1930s the facility became a Public Assistance Institution and in 1948 it joined the National Health Service as Fordingbridge Infirmary for the Chronic Sick.

After the Fordingbridge Cottage Hospital at Highfield House on Alderholt Road closed, its services were transferred to the Bartons Road site in 1984, and a modern facility, known as Ford Ward, opened on the Bartons Road site, which itself became known as Fordingbridge Hospital.

After failing to maintain staffing levels, the hospital closed to admissions in September 2023.

== Services ==
The hospital provides 20 beds for older people and has physiotherapy and occupational therapy support. A small outpatient department in the older building accommodates a moderate range of specialities including: podiatry, ear, nose and throat services, audiology, speech and language therapy, continence service, dermatology services, stroke clinic services and dietitian services.
