= Sandleheath =

Village and parish in Hampshire, England

Coordinates: 50.932°N 1.823°W

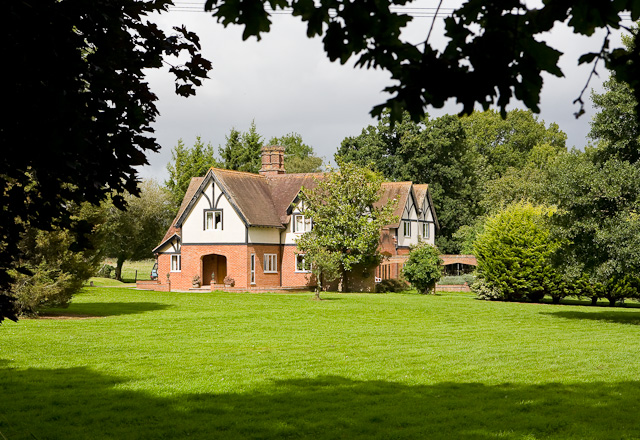
- Sandle Grange

- Location within Hampshire
- Population: 663 (2001); 680 (2011 Census)
- OS grid reference: SU1214
- Civil parish: Sandleheath
- District: New Forest
- Shire county: Hampshire
- Region: South East
- Country: England
- Sovereign state: United Kingdom
- Post town: Fordingbridge
- Postcode district: SP6
- Dialling code: 01425
- Police: Hampshire and Isle of Wight
- Fire: Hampshire and Isle of Wight
- Ambulance: South Central
- UK Parliament: New Forest West
- Website: Sandleheath Parish Council

Sandleheath is a village and civil parish about 1.8 miles (2.9 km) west of Fordingbridge in the New Forest District of Hampshire, England. It has a population of 663, increasing to 680 at the 2011 Census. It lies immediately north-east of the traditional tripoint between Hampshire, Dorset and Wiltshire.

== History ==
Sandle Manor is an Elizabethan manor house that was extended in 1900 and 1936.

The Church of England parish church of Saint Aldhelm was designed by the architect Charles Ponting and constructed in 1907.

== Economy and amenities ==
The village has a small area of common land at its centre, a village shop and post office and a small industrial estate. Sandleheath has a Sea Scout group which has a hall in the village. The village used to have two brickyards one of which provided the bricks for the now village hall.
