= Rockbourne =

Village and parish in Hampshire, England

Coordinates: 50.9637°N 1.8391°W

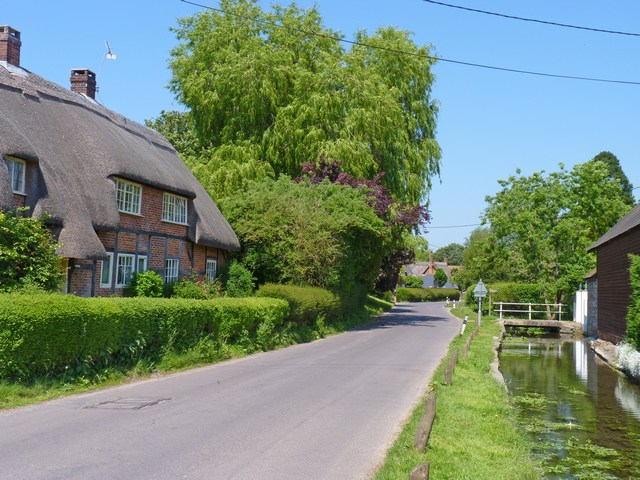
- Rockbourne

- Location within Hampshire
- Population: 319; 331 (2011 Census)
- OS grid reference: SU114183
- District: New Forest
- Shire county: Hampshire
- Region: South East
- Country: England
- Sovereign state: United Kingdom
- Post town: FORDINGBRIDGE
- Postcode district: SP6
- Dialling code: 01725
- Police: Hampshire and Isle of Wight
- Fire: Hampshire and Isle of Wight
- Ambulance: South Central
- UK Parliament: New Forest West

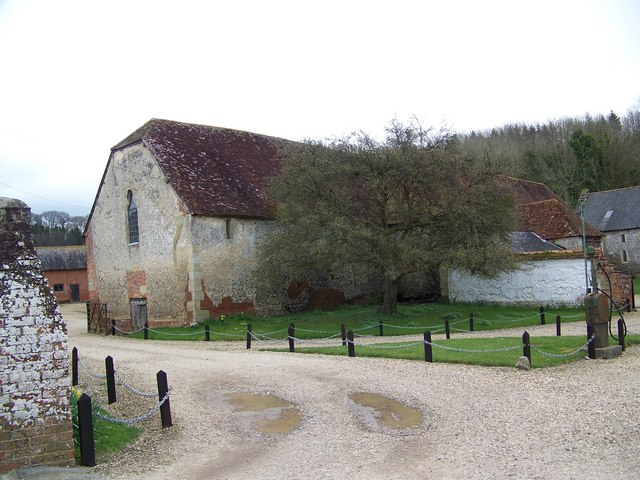
Medieval farm buildings

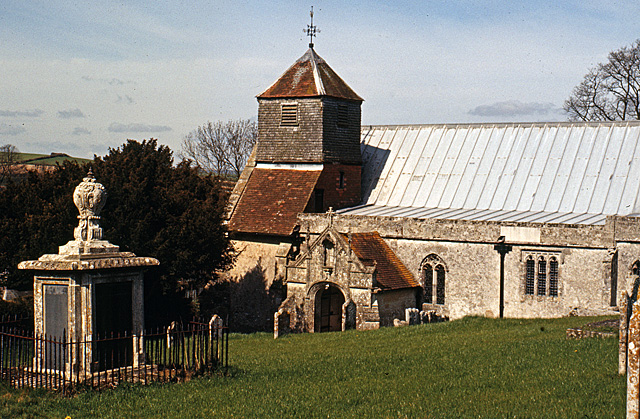
Church of St Andrew

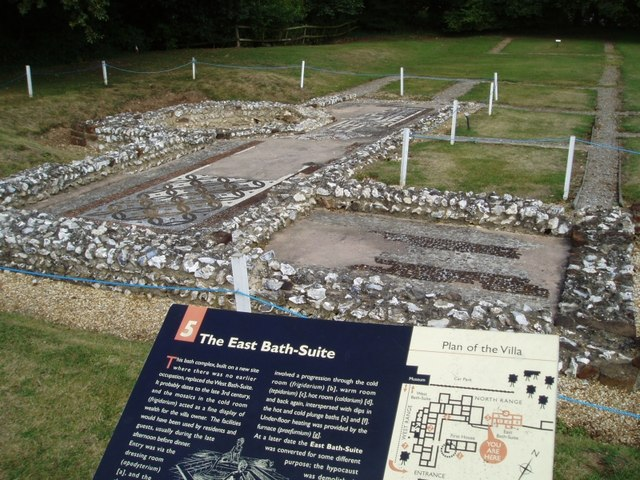
Rockbourne Roman Villa

Rockbourne is a village and civil parish in the English county of Hampshire, close to Fordingbridge.

== Overview ==
Rockbourne is a village of thatched, brick and timber houses, next to a stream now known as Sweatfords Water. The village consists chiefly of one street almost half a mile long. The church is in the northeast of the main street. Close to the church, adjoining the north side of the churchyard, is a manorial complex consisting of small L-shaped 14th-century house, now used as part of a modern farmhouse; the remains of a large Elizabethan or Jacobean house a short distance to the east; a 13th-century chapel near its southeast angle; and a large 15th-century barn running northward from the chapel.

The village is home to the oldest Cruck framed building in Hampshire. The building which was being used as a barn in the early 90s is part of the manor and dates from the first half of the 1280s.

== History ==
Rockbourne has a long history of human habitation. Three Neolithic long barrows are known within the parish boundaries, as well as the sites of over twenty Bronze Age bowl barrows. At Knoll Camp, there is also the site of an Iron Age Hill fort with a single bank and ditch. At West Park, Rockbourne Roman Villa has been excavated since the 1950s, revealing over 70 rooms, several with mosaic floors and hypocausts. The collection of finds from the site have been housed permanently in the museum building on the site, which is the only villa site in Hampshire open to the public.

The name Rockbourne, recorded as Rocheborne in 1086, may derive from Old English "Hrocaburna", Rooks' stream, or perhaps Rocky stream. In the earliest records Rockbourne was a royal manor. In the Domesday Book of 1086, Alwy son of Turber held a hide there which Wulfgeat had previously held of King Edward. Saewin also held half a hide of the gift of King Edward, to which the sheriff in 1086 made an unsuccessful claim as part of the king's farm, but which at a later date reverted to the Crown.

Alwy was succeeded here as in Hale and Tytherley by the Cardenvilles, and in the 13th century William Cardenville held a free tenement in Rockbourne. Before 1156 the manor had been granted to Baron Manser Bisset. He was succeeded before 1177 by a son Henry, and whose widow Iseuld was holding Rockbourne early in the next century. Their eldest son William died c. 1220, and was succeeded by his brother John, who died in 1241. Rockbourne passed to his daughter Ela, and then to her son John who assumed his mother's surname. He died in 1307, leaving a son John, who died unmarried in 1334, leaving the manor to his sister Margaret, at that time the wife of Robert Martin, on whom the manor was settled in 1338.

Early in 1336 Robert Martin complained that a certain John de Crucheston (Crux Easton) and others had abducted Margaret his wife and taken away his goods. Not waiting for justice, he retaliated by breaking into the house of John de Crucheston and seizing his property. Some years later he took Crucheston prisoner, torturing him "with cords tied round his head and other torments, and extorting £1,150 from his friends for his release." Robert Martin died in 1355, his wife surviving him until 1373, when the manor passed to her eldest son by her first husband, Sir Walter de Romsey. It then passed by inheritance into the Keilway family, it being held by John Keilway on his death in 1547. His son Francis died in 1601–2, and his son Thomas succeeded to Rockbourne, which, already heavily mortgaged to Sir Anthony Ashley, he sold in 1608 to Sir Anthony's son-in-law, Sir John Cooper. Sir John Cooper was succeeded by his eldest son Anthony Ashley Cooper, created Earl of Shaftesbury in 1672, and the manor descended with the Earls of Shaftesbury.

The nearby manor of Rockstead, which Aldwin held before 1066, belonged to Hugh de Port in 1086. Rockstead had passed to Breamore Priory before 1291. It belonged to the priory at the Dissolution and was granted with its other possessions to Henry Courtenay, 1st Marquess of Exeter and Gertrude his wife in November 1536. Escheating to the Crown in 1539, it was granted to Anne of Cleves, but in 1548 passed to Sir Thomas Henneage and William Lord Willoughby, who in the following year sold it to William Keilway. After this date it followed the descent of Rockbourne and became merged in that manor, its name only surviving in Rockstead Farm.

== Rockbourne Roman Villa ==
Rockbourne Roman villa once stood in the centre of a large farming estate, and is the largest known villa in the area. Its history spans the period from the Iron Age to the 5th century. The villa included bath houses, living quarters, farm buildings and workshops. Much of the villa is on public display and there is a site museum, with excavated artefacts, tracing the villa's history.

== Saint Andrew's church ==
The 11th/12th-century church of Saint Andrew is a flint structure with a tiled roof, and a timber and wood tiled belfry. Originally cruciform, it bears the remains of an 11th-century Saxon north door and north transept arch. The church was enlarged in the 13th, 16th and 17th centuries. There is a 14th-century chantry chapel restored in the 19th century.
