= A31 road =

Major trunk road in southern England

A31

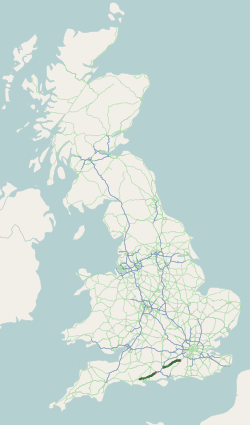

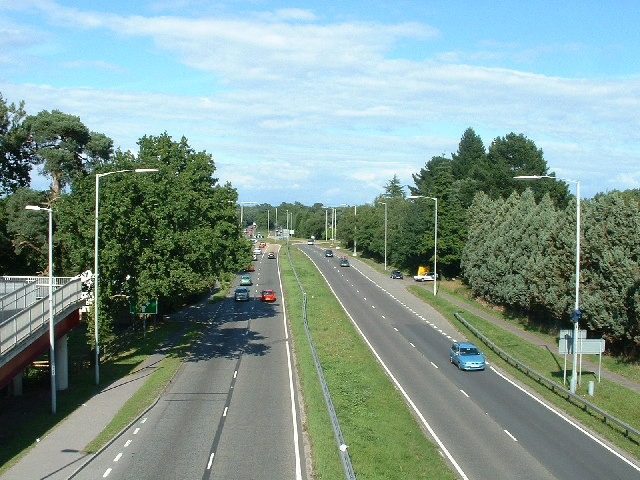
- A31 Road at St. Leonards, Dorset, England

Route information
- Length: 72.6 mi (116.8 km)

Northeast segment
- Length: 36.6 mi (58.9 km)
- Northeast end: A322 in Guildford

- Major intersections: A3 near Guildford A331 near Tongham; A33 in Winchester
- Southwest end: M3 in Winchester

Southwest
- Length: 36.0 mi (57.9 km)
- Northeast end: A36 near Netley Marsh
- Major intersections: M27 in Cadnam A338 in Ringwood A348 in West Moors A350 near Sturminster Marshall
- Southwest end: A35 in Bere Regis

Location
- Country: United Kingdom
- Counties: Surrey, Hampshire, Dorset
- Primary destinations: Winchester; Farnham; Ringwood

Road network
- Roads in the United Kingdom; Motorways; A and B road zones
← A30	→ A32

The A31 is a major trunk road in southern England that runs from Guildford in Surrey to Bere Regis in Dorset. Its best-known section is the Hog's Back, a ridge forming part of the North Downs between Guildford and Farnham in Surrey.

== Route description ==
Some of the ancient route from London to Winchester is used by the A31. The road begins near Guildford station at the start of Farnham Road, coming out of the town and passing over the A3, then becoming a dual carriageway running west along the Hog's Back escarpment of the North Downs. This dual carriageway section has a speed limit of 60 mph. At Tongham it leaves the older Hog's Back route to join the A331 and follow a modern bypass round Farnham, rejoining the older route at the roundabout junction with the A325 where it follows Alton Road toward Alton which it bypasses, rejoining the older route near Jane Austen's house, then continuing to Alresford before joining the route of the M3 motorway at its junction on the eastern boundary of Winchester.

The old route to Winchester's centre then Romsey and the New Forest forms two roads: the B3404 and A3090 roads and is marked for cyclists. The west branch of the M27 motorway – M3 interchange has a flyover junction with the winding westbound A3090 on the western boundary of Cadnam, having passed through the conservation area village centre, from where the resumed A31 continues as a dualled trunk road through the rest of the New Forest, past Ringwood and enters Dorset just before it passes Ferndown where it resumes single carriageway width. It passes Wimborne Minster and by-passes Charborough Park before terminating at a roundabout junction with the A35 road at Bere Regis. The section of the A35 running east of Bere Regis is not a trunk road, but the section to the west is, acting as a continuation of the A31 trunk road, thus the Highways Agency maintain it.

For most of its Dorset stretch, the A31 between Wimborne Minster and Bere Regis is primarily a single-carriageway road, used by heavy goods vehicles, and as such is relatively slow for a trunk road during busy times of the day. However the River Stour, alongside, is one of the most flood-prone rivers in the region; as such, a widened road would accelerate drainage and disrupt views of the valley from Areas of Outstanding Beauty on the escarpments to the north.

== A31 New Forest dual carriageway ==
Many sections of the A31 were upgraded to dual carriageway in the 1960s, except for the section of road running through the New Forest.

The upgrade of the A31 through the New Forest started in the early 1960s, following two decades of debate. The Government's intention was to create at least one high-speed route to the south coast, while the managers of the forest, the Verderers, resisted any further development.

The first section of the A31 to be dualled was the section that the M27 feeds into at Jct1; the westbound carriageway is the original two-way A-road while the eastbound side was laid down nearby. Further developments occurred from Ringwood to Picket Post near the turn-off for Burley. From 1966 to 1972, the remaining sections were completed rapidly due to the construction of the M27 motorway up to Jct 1.

The Highways Agency declares the New Forest A31 section as being 'an abnormal and heavy load route'. The westbound route, particularly, suffers from poor horizontal and vertical alignment due to its original function as an old single carriageway. The Highways Agency's route management strategy (RMS) for the A31 has identified that the westbound carriageway needs realigning at Cadnam where it undulates rapidly before negotiating a sharp right turn and passes an at-grade U-turn box, though there is no timetable for this at present. There is also a pinch point at Ringwood where the A31 interplexes with the A338; the section of road was widened to four lanes each way for the duration of the A338 interplex (following the upgrade of the Ashley Heath Junction to Bournemouth in the early 1990s) but a short section where westbound A338 traffic joins westbound A31 was left with 2 lanes, and previously the lack of capacity at this section caused safety problems and queues at peak times. Dorset County Council cited relieving this junction as a high priority in the Bournemouth LTP 2006–2011. In December 2014 the Government announced a series of schemes as part of a £15bn investment in transport infrastructure that included widening the Westbound carriageway to 3 lanes. Work to widen the westbound section to 3 lanes began in January 2022 in conjunction with a wider scheme improving safety, and replacing two bridges over the River Avon and Bickerley Millstream. The widening scheme was completed in November 2022. A Highways Agency review in 2010 records that the collision rate between the A338 Ringwood junction and the Poulner Hill Interchange was 4.5 Personal Injury Collisions (PICs) per 100million vehicle kilometers, whilst the rate for the stretch between Poulner Hill and Picket Post is 11.7 PICs per 100million vehicle kilometers.

== A31 between Bere Regis and Wimborne ==
This section of road is single carriageway for its entire length, a long section around Winterborne Zelston has a 40 mph speed limit, and occasionally has mobile speed cameras in place.

There are no good overtaking places on this stretch of road due to its narrow, twisty nature. There are three long straight sections of road along Charborough Park, at the end of each straight there is blind bend. Due to the lack of alternative overtaking places traffic use this stretch of road to overtake, but due to the blind bends this sometimes results in head-on collisions between vehicles. The 6 ft wall that runs alongside the road has many holes, and repaired sections which have been hit by cars over the years.

The A31 crosses the A350 at a large roundabout. Due to the volume of traffic crossing this roundabout on both the A350 and A31, clear lane markings have been added to ease congestion.

Sections along the A31 have been widened or straightened and junctions enhanced, particularly as the population of the main towns in Dorset has expanded.

== A3090 road ==
A3090
- Location: Hampshire
- Length: 19 mi (31 km)

A section of the A31 between Winchester and Ower in Hampshire is now known as the A3090.

Prior to completion of the M3 past Winchester in 1995, the A3090 ran south west from the A33 at Kings Worthy (where the A33 diverted around the Winchester Bypass) to the centre of Winchester, before continuing along the historic route of the A31 from Winchester to Hursley. Here it ended at a junction with the A31, which at this time, having merged with the by-pass east of Winchester, re-emerged from the A33 at Otterbourne and ran to Hursley and on along the current route of the A3090.

A short dual carriageway section starts from the A36 roundabout near Ower and terminates just before the A27 multiplex south west of Romsey.

== B3404 road ==
A short stretch of the original A31 immediately to the east of Winchester is now by-passed and renumbered as the B3404. The old route commences at a roundabout at Morn Hill, and continues straight across the top of Magdalen Hill Down before crossing over the M3 motorway and A272 road on an overbridge and then descending the steep street of Magdalen Hill into the centre of Winchester.

== Junction lists ==
North-east segment

County	Location	mi	km	Destinations	Notes
Surrey	Guildford	0.0	0.0	A322 to A3 / M25 / A281 – Bagshot, London, Horsham	North-eastern terminus
Surrey	Guildford–Compton boundary	2.2	3.5	A3 north-east to M25 / A25 – London, Esher, Dorking	Junction; north-east exit and south-west entrance
Surrey	Wanborough	3.6	5.8	B3000 to A3 south-west – Portsmouth, Godalming, Normandy, Compton, Puttenham, Wanborough	Junction
Surrey	Tongham–Farnham boundary	6.9– 7.5	11.1– 12.1	A331 north to M3 / A3011 / A324 / A323 – Camberley, Farnborough, Woking, Aldershot	Junction; southern terminus of A331
Surrey	Farnham	8.8– 9.2	14.2– 14.8	A325 north-east / Guildford Road to A3016 – Odiham, Badshot Lea, Central Farnham	North-eastern terminus of A325 concurrency
Surrey	Farnham	10.8	17.4	A325 south-west / West Street – Petersfield, Wrecclesham, Central Farnham	South-western terminus of A325 concurrency
Hampshire	Alton–Chawton boundary	19.8– 20.2	31.9– 32.5	A339 north / B3006 to B3349 – Basingstoke, Alton, Liss, Selborne, Odiham	Junction; southern terminus of A339
Hampshire	Chawton	20.8	33.5	A32 south (Gosport Road) / Winchester Road / Northfield Lane to A272 – Fareham, Petersfield, Droxford, West Meon, Farringdon, Chawton	Northern terminus of A32
Hampshire	Chilcomb	34.4	55.4	A272 east – Petersfield, Bramdean, Cheriton	No access from A31 north-east to A272 east; north-eastern terminus of A272 concurrency
Hampshire	Winchester	35.7	57.5	A33 north to M3 / A34 / A303 / A30 – Basingstoke, Newbury, Andover, Salisbury, Winnall, Kings Worthy, Stockbridge	Southern terminus of A33
Hampshire	Winchester	36.3– 36.6	58.4– 58.9	M3 south to M27 – Southampton, Portsmouth, Bournemouth, Eastleigh, Romsey; Bar End Road / Bull Drove – Winchester city centre	Western terminus of eastern segment; no access to M3 north or from M3 south to A31; south-western terminus of A272 concurrency
1.000 mi = 1.609 km; 1.000 km = 0.621 mi: Incomplete access

South-west segment

County	Location	mi	km	Destinations	Notes
Hampshire	Netley Marsh	0.0	0.0	A36 (Salisbury Road) to A3090 – Salisbury, Calmore, Totton, Romsey	North-eastern terminus
Hampshire	Cadnam	2.5	4.0	A336 east / A337 south – Cadnam, Totton, Lyndhurst, Lymington, Bartley, Netley Marsh, Minstead	Western terminus of A336; northern terminus of A337
Hampshire	Copythorne–Minstead boundary	2.9	4.7	M27 east / B3079 – London, Southampton, Winchester, Brook, Bramshaw, Fordingbridge, Fritham, Bolderwood, Linwood	Western terminus of A27; A27 junction 1
Hampshire	Picket Post	10.6– 11.0	17.1– 17.7	Burley	Junction
Hampshire	Ringwood	12.4– 12.8	20.0– 20.6	Hightown, Poulner, Crow	Junction; Crow signed north-east only
Hampshire	Ringwood	13.4– 13.8	21.6– 22.2	A338 north / B3347 – Salisbury, Fordingbridge, Ringwood	North-eastern terminus of A338 concurrency
Dorset	St Ives	14.2– 14.5	22.9– 23.3	B3081 – Verwood	Junction
Dorset	St Ives	14.5– 15.1	23.3– 24.3	A338 south to B3073 – Bournemouth, Christchurch, Ashley Heath, Three Legged Cross, Horton	To B3073 signed eastbound only; junction; south-western terminus of A338 concurrency
Dorset	Ferndown–West Moors boundary	19.0	30.6	A348 south-west to A347 – Bournemouth, Ferndown, West Parley, Longham	North-eastern terminus of A348
Dorset	Ferndown–West Moors boundary	19.6– 19.9	31.5– 32.0	B3072 – West Moors, Verwood, Ferndown	Junction
Dorset	Broadstone	24.5	39.4	A349 south / Merley House Lane to B3073 / A341 – Poole, Bournemouth, Broadstone, Merley, Canford Magna	Northern terminus of A349
Dorset	Sturminster Marshall–Lytchett Matravers boundary	28.8	46.3	A350 (Poole Road) – Poole, Bournemouth, Wareham, Blandford, Lytchett Matravers, Upton, Sturminster Marshall	Sturminster Marshall signed north-east only
Dorset	Bere Regis	36.0	57.9	A35 / North Street – Poole, Bournemouth, Dorchester, Wool, Bere Regis, Weymouth, Puddletown, Tolpuddle	South-western terminus
1.000 mi = 1.609 km; 1.000 km = 0.621 mi
