= A roads in Zone 3 of the Great Britain numbering scheme =

The numbering zones for A-roads in Great Britain

List of A roads in zone 3 in Great Britain starting west of the A3 and south of the A4 (roads beginning with 3).

== Single- and double-digit roads ==
Road	From	To	Length	Notes
A3	The Monument, London	Portsmouth	78 miles (126 km)	A large majority is a trunk road. Its southern parallel motorway is designated the A3(M).
A30	Hounslow, West London	Land's End	281 miles (452 km)	Replaced for 6 miles (9.7 km) between Popham and the Bullington interchange by the A303 trunk road southwest of Basingstoke. A trunk road west of Exeter. Previously went via A343, Salisbury Road (old A343), B3042 (old A303), A3057, London Road (old B3400), B3400, and city streets (old A33) between Lopcombe Hill and Basingstoke, but this was changed as part of a renumbering of roads in the area. Replaced for 5 miles by M5 (J29 - J31) near Exeter.
A31	Guildford	Bere Regis	68 miles (109 km)	Near the M3 its Romsey and Winchester portion is replaced by: • the J10 to J11, M3, Winchester • The A3090 from J11 to Ower in the New Forest District — a winding route covering 11 miles (18 km) in 16 miles (26 km).
A32	Gosport	Alton	29 miles (47 km)	All in Hampshire
A33	Winchester	Reading	39 miles (63 km)	Resumes in Southampton as various roads such as the arterial road alongside Southampton Dock.
A34	Winchester	Salford	157 miles (253 km)	Most of the section between Oxford and Solihull is arguably the A44 and the A3400 however its modern course ends northeast to join the M40 from which the northern part of the road can be accessed after one junction of the M42 motorway. A trunk road to Oxford and between Stafford and Stoke on Trent.
A35	Southampton	Honiton	98 miles (158 km)	Originally went southwest from Charmouth to Clyst St Mary along what is now the A3052.
A36	Southampton	Bath	62 miles (100 km)	
A37	Dorchester	Bristol	60 miles (97 km)	Broken in two past the former Roman town of Ilchester by a bypass which is a small fraction of the A303
A38	Bodmin	Mansfield	292 miles (470 km)	Replaced by J27 to J31, M5 past Exeter. Replaced in Birmingham by a shorter parallel road into the city centre, the A38(M). A dual carriageway in South Devon, Staffordshire and Derbyshire. The longest 2-digit A road in the UK, at 292 miles.
A39	Newton Park near Bath	Falmouth	191 miles (307 km)	

== Triple-digit roads ==
Road	From	To	Notes
A300	Upper Thames Street, City of London	Newington Causeway, near Elephant & Castle	Southwark Bridge
A301	Aldwych	St George's Circus	Waterloo Bridge
A302	Hyde Park Corner, London	Elephant & Castle	In two parts. 1. The London Inner Ring Road at Grosvenor Place to the Victoria one way system. 2. Victoria Street, half of Parliament Square and then Bridge Street (Westminster Bridge), followed by part of Westminster Bridge Road (which replaced part of the A23) and finally St George's Road (one way (north-west)) past St George's Cathedral, Southwark).
A303	M3 J8 south of Basingstoke	A30, between Newcott and Rawridge	A303 was previously used for the road from County Hall, London to Wandsworth, which was renumbered to the new A3036 so that the number could be used on the current route which replaced the old A3036, the original A3079, and parts of other roads.
A304	Fulham	Fulham	The western part of the Fulham Road. Originally continued east via what is now the A308 and the A4 to the A4 (now the A315).
A305	East Sheen	Hanworth	The road used to continue west of the A312 to the A308 in Sunbury via what is now the A316.
A306	Hammersmith	Roehampton	Hammersmith Bridge closed to motor traffic from April 2019
A307	Kew	Cobham	The section between Kingston upon Thames and Cobham follows the course of the old A3, and is still mostly called Portsmouth Road.
A308	Brompton	Maidenhead	Exists in three sections, one from Brompton to Chelsea, the second from Chelsea to north of Putney Bridge, and the third from the Robin Hood junction at Kingston Vale to Maidenhead. The section from the A4 to the A3220 was originally part of the A304, and the section from the A3220 to A219 was originally part of the A3217. The section between Roehampton and Kingston upon Thames follows the course of the old A3.
A309	Twickenham	Hook, London	Runs in two sections, one in Twickenham and Teddington as a non primary road and a longer primary section from Hampton Court to Hook.
A310	Hampton Wick	Brentford	Runs from the Hampton Wick junction with the A308 at Kingston Bridge northwards via Teddington, Strawberry Hill, Twickenham and Isleworth to the junction with the A315 at Brentford.
A311	Hampton	Twickenham	Also a road connecting Park Road and North Camp station roundabouts.
A312	Hampton	Harrow	The road has been dubbed "The A three-one-queue" owing to frequent peak-hours' heavy congestion. Part of its course ran from Hatton to Harlington, London across where Heathrow Airport is instead of its present course past Cranford more directly to north-east Hayes and districts further north including Harrow. Its middle section is officially known as The Parkway The deleted section is now Faggs Road, Hatton Road (sections were lost under the airport), A437, Station Road, Coldharbour Lane, and Yeading Lane.
A313	Hampton Hill	Teddington	
A314	Hanworth	Hounslow	Continued beyond A312 to A316 before 2019, this section is now the B391
A315	Knightsbridge	East Bedfont	Exists in two parts: one from Knightsbridge to the junction with the A4, North and South Circular Roads at Chiswick Roundabout, and the other from the north end of Kew Bridge to East Bedfont. The section in between is part of the South Circular Road
A316	Chiswick	Start of M3 motorway (Sunbury-on-Thames)	
A317	Hersham	Chertsey	
A318	Chertsey	Byfleet	
A319	Lightwater	Chertsey	
A320	Guildford	Staines upon Thames	
A321	Henley	York Town near Camberley	The road used to continue south of the A30 to the A323 in Ash via what is now the B3411. Before that, the road went southeast from Frimley Green via the following renumbered roads: B3012 (to Pirbright), A324 (through Pirbright), B3012 (to Fox Corner), and A322 (to Guildford).
A322	Bracknell	Guildford	
A323	Hartley Wintney	Guildford	
A324	Woking	Normandy	Originally, the road continued west concurrent with the A323 and then southwest via the current B3208.
A325	Bagshot	Greatham	
A326	Totton	Fawley	A326 was previously used for the road from Farnham to Petersfield (now part of the A325, with the southern portion now Petersfield Road, Farnham Road, B3006, and Farnham Road (the A3 was built over one section))
A327	Reading	Farnborough	
A328	Old Windsor	Englefield Green	
A329	Wentworth, Virginia Water	Thame	
A330	Maidenhead	Sunningdale	
A331	Camberley	Runfold	Originally ran from Windsor to Ditton Park. Construction of the M4 in the 1960s meant the end of the road for the A331, and the M4 was built on top of it at Ditton Park with a parallel access road and the road into Windsor becoming the B470. The northernmost section was declassified altogether and is now Ditton Road.
A332	Bagshot	Slough	
A333	Hazel Grove (A3 Junction) near Grayshott	Hindhead	Renumbered when the Hindhead Tunnel opened in July 2011 having been formerly part of the A3. A333 was previously used for the road from Winchester to Cosham until 1994 when it was downgraded to B3335, B3354, and B2177.
A334	Wickham	Southampton	
A335	Southampton	Near Eastleigh	This was intended to be the route for the M272. Formerly had a branch from the A335/B3335 junction to Twyford. This branch is now the B3335.
A336	Cadnam	Totton	
A337	Near Cadnam	Christchurch	
A338	Bournemouth	Besselsleigh	Originally went via what is now the B3087 and A345 from Burbage to Salisbury; this was changed during a road renumbering in the area.
A339	Alton	Newbury	
A340	Basingstoke	Pangbourne	
A341	Merley, (Poole)	Redhill Roundabout, Redhill, Bournemouth	A341 was previously used for the road from Winchester to Lopcombe Corner. The section west of Stockbridge became part of the A30 which was rerouted, while the remaining section became part of the A272 (now B3049) at the same time that the current A341 was created.
A342	Chippenham	Andover	Previously continued southeast to Winchester; this section was changed to the new A303 (now the B3402), an extension of the A3057 and the new B3420 (southern portion now part of the A272) as part of a renumbering due to the creation of the current A303.
A343	Newbury	Lopcombe Corner, Winterslow	
A344	Unused		First used from Weyhill to Heytesbury. The section east of Stonehenge became part of the new A303 in 1934. The section just west of Stonehenge became a portion of the A360 by 1956, while the remainder was downgraded to the B390 in the 1970s. Next used from the A303 at Stonehenge to the A360 at Airman's Corner. On 24 June 2013, the section from Stonehenge Bottom and Stonehenge was closed and grassed over. The remainder was downgraded to Class III as the C506.
A345	Marlborough	Salisbury	Formerly continued north via the current A346, A419, A4259, B4006, A4259, and B4311 to Swindon. Originally, the A345 went southeast from Marlborough via the current A346 to Ludgershall; this was changed in a road renumbering in the area.
A346	Ludgershall	M4 J15 southeast of Swindon	Follows A338 between Collingbourne Ducis and Burbage, then continues via Marlborough. A346 was previously used for the road from Collingbourne Ducis to the A303 south of Shipton Bellinger; this became part of the rerouted A338 in a road renumbering in the area, while the A346 number was reused on the old route of the A345.
A347	Ferndown	Bournemouth	
A348	Trickett's Cross	Poole	
A349	A31 in Wimborne	Poole	
A350	Poole	M4 J17 north of Chippenham	
A351	Lytchett Minster bypass	Swanage	via Corfe Castle
A352	Wareham bypass	Sherborne	
A353	Weymouth	Warmwell	Original route in Weymouth was downgraded to B3155 when A354 was rerouted away from Upwey.
A354	Salisbury	Isle of Portland	Previously ran through town centres of Dorchester and Weymouth. Rerouted in Upwey along new alignment.
A355	Amersham	Windsor	Originally ran from Sherborne to Durweston (near Blandford Forum). The route was chopped up and renumbered in the 1935 renumbering: the section from Sherborne to West Hill (near North Wooton) was absorbed by an extended A352 and the eastern end from Lyndlich to Durweston was handed over to the A357. The remaining seven mile section was deemed unworthy of a three-digit number, so it became the new A3030.
A356	Bower Hinton	Grimstone	
A357	A371, near Wincanton	Blandford Forum	
A358	Williton	east of Colyford	Route passes through Taunton and Chard in Somerset. Between Taunton and Ilminster, it provides the main link between the A303 and the M5. Route previously went southeast from Ilminster via what is now the A303 and the A3088 to Yeovil; the route was changed south of Ilminster to the current routing as part of a renumbering due to the creation of the current A303.
A359	Yeovil	Nunney	
A360	Devizes	Salisbury	
A361	Ilfracombe	Kilsby	The section between Beckhampton and the A4289 in Swindon was renumbered the A4361 to discourage through traffic, and the section through Swindon is now A4289, Wood Street, B4289, Shrivenham Road, Stratton Road, and B4006. Through traffic should use the A4, A346, and A419 between Beckhampton and Swindon. At 195 miles (314 km) is the longest 3 digit A road in the UK. Before the North Devon link road opened, it went along unclassified roads to South Molton, and then northeast via what is now the B3227.
A362	Warminster	Farrington Gurney	
A363	Bathford	Yarnbrook	Via Bradford-on-Avon and Trowbridge. Previously continued south to Warminster; this section became part of the A350.
A364	Unused		Ran between Yarnbrook and Chippenham in Wiltshire. Became a portion of an extended A350 in 1935. Was reserved in 1972 for the North Devon link road between Barnstaple and Bampton but that road was rerouted through Tiverton and opened as part of the A361 instead.
A365	Box	A361 near Seend	Via Atworth, Shaw, Melksham and Sells Green; originally joined the A350 through Melksham town centre but now both roads follow a western bypass.
A366	Trowbridge	Ammerdown crossroads (near Radstock)	
A367	Bath	Shepton Mallet	This road follows part of the original Fosse Way and is regularly used as a non-motorway route from Bath to Exeter via the A37, A303 and A30.
A368	Marksbury	Banwell, Somerset	Formerly continued northeast to Bath, but this section became part of the A39.
A369	Portishead	Bristol	A369 was previously used for the road from Glastonbury to Marksbury (now part of the A39). Number reused later as an upgrade to the eastern half of the B3124.
A370	Bristol	Near Brent Knoll	
A371	Wincanton	Weston-super-Mare	
A372	Podimore, Yeovilton	Bridgwater	
A373	Honiton	Cullompton	Formerly continued north to Uffculme concurrent with the M5 and west to Tiverton via what is now A361, this section became part of its current routes when the freeway extension west of Tiverton was completed. Before the freeway was built, the A373 went west from Honiton to South Molton via what is now the B3181 spur, B3181 (old A38), A38, A361, Lower Town, Turnpike, High Street, Post Hill, Blundell's Road, A396, A3126, and B3137. Earlier, the road was routed on what is now South View Road and Willand Road from Willand to Halberton, but this became part of the B3391, while the A373 was concurrent with the A38 north to Uffculme and west on the old A373 spur to Halberton as shown above. Earlier the road continued east to Charmouth via the current A35 (then the A35 went west via the current A3052). Originally, the A373 went west to Ilfracombe, but that section became part of an extended A361.
A374	Marsh Mills, Plymouth	Trerulefoot	Runs through Union Street, Plymouth. Originally followed the current A38 between these points (though one section became the B3413 when the A38 bypass was built), while the A38 followed the current route; these routings were swapped later, moving these routes to their current routes. A374 was previously used for the road from Donyatt to Colyford; this became part of the A358 as part of a renumbering due to creation of the current A303.
A375	Honiton	Sidmouth	
A376	Exeter	Exmouth	
A377	Exeter	Barnstaple	
A378	Langport	Taunton	A378 was previously used for the road from A379 south of Exeter to the A38 (now A3015) in Pinhoe (became part of rerouted A38 (now the north spur of the A379), and the rest was declassified (became the B3182 shortly after that, now Old Rydon Lane), and the northern section became part of the B3181 (now Clyst Road, Sidmouth Road, and Moor Lane).
A379	Splits: Kennford and M5 J30	Plymouth	Formerly ran through St. Marychurch in Torquay passing coach station. Rerouted along Babbacombe Road (original B3199). Concurrent with A3022 between Torquay and Paignton. From 1991 to 1997, the sections of route between Dawlish and Torquay and through Goodrington were downgraded to B3199.
A380	Kennford	Torbay	Bypasses Kingskerswell on new South Devon Highway. Previously continued into Torquay town centre but rerouted along Torbay Ring Road (former A3022) to junction with A385 and A3022.
A381	Teignmouth	Salcombe	
A382	Newton Abbot	East of Okehampton	
A383	Newton Abbot	Bickington	
A384	Dartington	Buckfastleigh	Originally Totnes to near Launceston via Two Bridges (eastern section now part of A385; western section now part of B3157 and B3162)
A385	A380/A3022 near Paignton	South Brent bypass	Previously continued along present A3022 into Paignton town centre. Previously followed what is now Plymouth Rd west of Totnes.
A386	Plymouth	Appledore	
A387	Polbathic	Polperro	
A388	Saltash bypass	Landcross	
A389	Padstow	Lanivet	
A390	Tavistock	Truro	
A391	St Austell	Lanivet	
A392	St. Columb Road	Newquay	A392 was previously used for the road from Truro to northeast of Redruth; this became part of an extended A390 (which was later rerouted north), and the A392 was reused on the current routing as an upgrade of part of the B3279.
A393	Redruth	Penryn bypass.	
A394	Treliever Cross, Penryn	Longrock, Ludgvan	
A395	Trewassa (Note: northeast of Camelford)	Tregadillett (Note: west of Launceston)	
A396	Dunster	Cowley	
A397	Portsmouth	Portsmouth	Former A3 through Cosham. It was planned to be extended north via Waterlooville to A3(M) J1, but this never happened. Originally ran from Halberton to Uffculme. Became a spur of the A373 in 1935 and is now declassified due to completion of the nearby M5 and A361. A small part east of M5 J27 is now part of the A38 as a "useless spur", as the A38 mainline was renumbered to B3181.
A398	Unused		Ran between Taunton and South Molton. Became a portion of an extended A361 in the 1935 renumbering; the A361 was later rerouted along its current route from M5 J27, and the section from Taunton to South Molton became the B3227. A short section east of South Molton remains the A361.
A399	South Molton bypass	Ilfracombe	

== Four-digit roads (30xx) ==
Road	From	To	Notes
A3000	Turnham Green	Chiswick	
A3001	Unused		Ran from Ealing to Brentford. Downgraded to a southern extension of the B455.
A3002	Brentford	Hanwell	
A3003	Mortlake	Barnes	
A3004	Isleworth	St Margarets	
A3005	Southall	Hounslow	
A3006	Henleys Corner, Hounslow	Hounslow	
A3007	Richmond	Richmond	
A3008	Hampton	Hampton	
A3009	Esher	Esher	
A3010	Basingstoke	Basingstoke	Originally ran along Park Street in Guildford between the A31 and A3 (now A3100). Renumbered to a spur of the A31 in July 1934 and is now part of the A3100. The northern portion is part of the Friary gyratory.
A3011	Farnborough	A331	Section east of A331 now the B3166. Earlier, the road continued south to east of Ash (this became part of the A321, and is now part of the B3411).
A3012	Unused		Ran from the A3011 in North Camp to the A3013 (now A321) in Ash Vale. Downgraded to the B3165 in 1995 due to completion of the A331 through North Camp.
A3013	Farnborough	Fleet	Previously allocated to a road from Frimley Green to Ash Vale. Became a portion of a rerouted A321 in the 1970s. Now downgraded to the B3411 due to completion of the parallel A331.
A3014	Unused		Ran from the A321 (former A3011, now B3411) to the A323 (former A324) in Ash, but was later extended to the A31 in Tongham. Downgraded to the B3206 due to completion of the A331 from the M3 to the A31; the southern extension to the A31 is now unclassified.
A3015	Sowton	Exeter	Originally ran from the A324 (now B3208) near Ash to the A325 in Aldershot. Became a western extension of the A323 in the 1935 renumbering; the westernmost section is now unclassified.
A3016	Hale	Hog Hatch	
A3017	Unused		Ran from the center of Windsor to the A308 in Windsor Great Park. Probably decommissioned in 1935 when the A332 was rerouted along then-B3022. Downgraded when the A332 Windsor bypass was built, with part of the route becoming the B3022; the section along King's Road was declassified. Number later used for a road linking Hilsea and Portsmouth. Became the northern carriageway of the A3 in the 1970s after the M275 was built.
A3018	Unused		Connected the then-A332 (now A3095) to the A331 west of Crowthorne. Became a spur of the A3095 in 1935 after the A332 was rerouted; route later downgraded and is now an eastern extension of the B3348. Route later used for a loop off the eastern side of the A3017 in Portsmouth. Now the southern carriageway of the A3.
A3019	Unused		Original link to the Royal Dockyards in Portsmouth; now unclassified.
A3020	Cowes	Shanklin	Swapped with the A3056 in 1935.
A3021	East Cowes	Newport	
A3022	A380 at Edginswell	Brixham	Previously ran entire length of Torbay Ring Road but rerouted into Torquay (former A380) and along former A379 between Torquay and Paignton. Concurrent with A379 between Torquay and Paignton. Section past Paignton Zoo formerly part of A385. An older A3022 existed on the Isle of Wight until 1935 when it became part of an extended A3054. It ran between Newport and Ryde, terminating at the pier.
A3023	Near Havant	Hayling Island	Number is out-of-zone as it was originally the B2149. Originally ran on the Isle of Wight from Ryde to Sandown. Renumbered as an extension of the A3055 in 1935; the southernmost section is now the B3329.
A3024	Southampton	M27 J8	Number also appeared in the 1974 AA Touring Guide to England for York Road running along the southern bank of the River Avon in Bristol. This is probably a typo for the A3034 which survived on York Road longer than originally thought. Now part of the A370.
A3025	Southampton	Netley	
A3026	Ludgershall	North Tidworth	
A3027	Staplegrove	Taunton	First used along Queen Street in Salisbury. Decommissioned probably by the 1960s (the number was in use elsewhere), but may have been renumbered as a spur of a nearby route well before then. Now entirely pedestrianized. Next used in Taunton town center along Upper High Street, connecting the A38 to itself. Because it performed so well in taking traffic out of the center of Taunton, it became a portion of a rerouted A38.
A3028	Durrington	A303 via Bulford	
A3029	Bedminster	Hotwells	Originally ran between the A342 to the A345 south of Upavon. Renumbered as a spur of the A345, probably in 1935.
A3030	Sherborne	Lydlinch	Originally ran along Ashley Road in Branksome, Poole. Renumbered as a spur of the A345 in the 1935 renumbering and is now part of the B3061 after the A345 was cut back.
A3031	Chelsea Embankment	Battersea Park	First used in Poole from the A35 to the then-A348. Became a portion of a rerouted A35 in 1935 and is now part of an extended A350, although the northernmost part is part of an A35 gyratory. Next used along a former routing of the A33 in Reading. Downgraded to a B road with the same number.
A3032	Hare Hatch	Charvil	Originally ran along Cornhill, South Street and Weymouth Avenue in Dorchester, cutting the corner between the then-A35 and A37. Renumbered as a portion of the A354 in 1935; now unclassified and partially pedestrianized.
A3033	Weston-super-Mare	Uphill	Originally the B3127, it previously terminated on the original A370 Locking Road. Although a bypass for the town centre, most traffic seeking to avoid the town centre uses the unclassified Winterstoke Road. Originally ran along Southbroom Place (now Southbroom Road) in Devizes, cutting the corner between the A342 and A360 and just missing the A361. Now a portion of the A360, although it may have been a spur before this.
A3034	Unused		Ran along York Road between the A36 and A38 in Bristol. Initially thought to have become an eastern extension of the A370 in 1935, a mid-1960s map shows the route as still A3034 and the 1974 AA Touring Guide to England shows the road as A3024 (a typo), meaning the route may have had its number until the 1970s; it is now likely that the change was in 1935, but was later reversed as some large scale OS maps from the 1940s and 1950s show the road as A370. Number possibly later used along Queen Street in Maidenhead; possibly a typo for the A3064 or it may have been changed later on for some reason.
A3035	Southampton	Southampton Common	Originally ran from Axbridge to Cross. Renumbered as a spur of the A371 in the 1935 renumbering.
A3036	County Hall, London	Wandsworth	Formerly the A303. Originally ran from the A358 in South Petherton to the A37 in Ilchester. Between 1927 and 1932 it was extended over the B3090 to the now-gone A344 near Stonehenge. Renumbered to the A303 in 1933; the A3036 number was reused as a renumbering of the original A303. See also: Albert Embankment
A3037	Unused		Ran from the A358 (later A303, now unclassified) to the A374 (later A358) in Ilminster. Declassified in 1988 due to completion of the Ilminster bypass and the declassification of the A303.
A3038	North Town, Taunton	Rowbarton, Taunton	Originally linked Ditton Street to High Street in Ilminster. Renumbered as a spur of the A3037 in the 1935 renumbering; now unclassified due to completion of the Ilminster bypass and resultant decommissioning of the A3037.
A3039	Bath	Bath	Originally ran along the western part of Chard Street and part of Victoria Place in Axminster. Became a spur of the A374 (later A358) and is now part of the A358 itself. May have been the shortest identified A road in the British Isles at just 174 ft (53 m).
A3040	Branksome	Wallisdown	Originally a loop off the A376 in Budleigh Salterton. Still marked as A3040 on a 1958 OS map, it was likely downgraded at the same time as the A376. Now part of an extended B3178.
A3041	Unused		Ran from the Devonport seafront to the A386. Decommissioned when the present A38 opened: the southernmost section is unclassified, the route through Stoke is now the B3396 and the section from Milehouse to Hartley is now a rerouted A386.
A3042	Unused		Ran from the A389 (later A38, now A374) in Devonport to the A387 (later A388, now A3064) in Keyham. Downgraded in the 1970s after the current A38 opened and is now the B3396.
A3043	Unused		Ran from the A3042 (now the B3396) in Devonport to the A3041 (also now the B3396) in Stoke. Renumbered to A3049 (now B3396) for reasons unknown.
A3044	Staines upon Thames	Harmondsworth	Originally ran from Plymouth Street to Ford Street in Tavistock. Became a portion of the A390 when Ford Street was declassified.
A3045	Unused		Loop off A390 in Lostwithiel. Decommissioned due to completion of the Lostwithiel bypass and is now part of the town's B3268 one-way system. Later reserved around 1970 for "existing parallel length of A329 when passed by the S.E. Reading to N.W. Wokingham relief road", but the number was not used.
A3046	Woking	Chobham	Originally ran from the A39 and A393 to the A394 northwest of Penryn. May have been renumbered as a spur of the A394 in 1935 (shown as such on a 1957 OS map) but is now part of a rerouted A39, forming a portion of the Penryn bypass.
A3047	Scorrier	Camborne	Originally ran along Clinton Road in Redruth, paralleling the original A393 (now B3300). Probably renumbered as a spur in 1935, but is now unclassified.
A3048	Unused		Ran along St Thomas Road connecting the A388 to the then-A30 on the west side of Launceston Castle and was later extended along the old A30 to the A30 southern bypass when it was built in the 1940s. Now just a spur of the A388.
A3049	Fleetsbridge	Boscombe	Number first used on a road cutting the corner between the A3 and the A27 near Portsmouth; was the first A3xxx number allocated after the original 1922 classification. Became a spur of the A27 in 1935 and later part of the A27 itself after the Cosham and Havant bypasses were built. Next used as an unexplained renumbering of the A3043 in Plymouth. Now part of the B3396.
A3050	Weybridge	Hampton Court	
A3051	Botley	Locks Heath	
A3052	Charmouth	Clyst St Mary	Formerly part of the A35. Originally ran from Salisbury to the A303 north of Cholderton; was the B3085. Became a portion of a rerouted A338 in 1935.
A3053	Unused		Ran from Bradford-on-Avon to Melksham in Wiltshire; was the B3104. Downgraded following the completion of the A350 Melksham bypass; the section within the bypass is now part of the A3102 and the remainder is now the B3107.
A3054	Ryde	Totland	Northern part of Isle of Wight circular A-Class loop. Most of the Newport to Ryde section was the A3022 until 1935.
A3055	Ryde	Totland	Southern part of Isle of Wight circular A-Class loop
A3056	Newport	Sandown	Originally ran from Blackwater to Shanklin on the Isle of Wight; was the B3326. Swapped with the A3020 in 1935.
A3057	Southampton	Andover	
A3058	Mellanvrane	St Austell	
A3059	St Columb Minor	St Columb Major	
A3060	Red Hill Roundabout, Bournemouth	Iford, Dorset, Bournemouth	Originally ran from St Austwell to Charlestown. Became an eastern extension of the A3061 in 1935.
A3061	Unused		Ran between the A391 to a pier in St Austwell harbor; formerly the A390 and A3060. Now declassified and mostly pedestrianized.
A3062	Odd Down	Widcombe	Originally used in 1926 as an unexplained renumbering of a section of the A287 west of the A32. Returned to the A287 in 1935.
A3063	Heston	Hanworth Road, Whitton	First used along an old routing of the A3 in Kingston when the A3 number was used for the Kingston bypass instead of the A239. The A239 would have been out of zone, so the A3063 number was used instead. Became the A308 (to the north) and A307 (to the south) by 1932. Next used as an upgrade of the B3021 from Old Windsor to Datchet. Renumbered as an extension of the A328 in 1935, but has since gotten its old number as it was downgraded back to the B3021.
A3064	Milehouse	Weston Mill	Originally ran along Queen Street in Maidenhead, cutting the corner between the A308 and A4; not on the 1922 Road Lists, but designated in 1927. Renumbered as a spur of the A308 in the 1935 renumbering, but is now unclassified and completely pedestrianized.
A3065	Staplegrove	Bishop's Hull	Known as "Silk Mills Road" Originally ran along the old A4 through Twyford. Renumbered as not one, but two spurs of the A321 in the 1935 renumbering; now the A3032.
A3066	Haselbury Plucknett	Bridport	
A3067	Unused		Ran from the A36 to the A33 with a spur (former B3057) to the A3035, formed a portion of the South Coast Trunk Road (the T37) from 1946. Originally the A35 until it was renumbered to A3067 around 1940 for unknown reasons (probably to remove the multiplex with the A36) and became the A36 again when Tebourba Way was built in 1953.
A3068	Unused		Ran from Christchurch to Lymington; was a portion of the B3054. Renumbered as a portion of the A337 in 1935.
A3069	Unused		Ran from Lymington to Lyndhurst; originally portions of the B3056 and B3057. Renumbered as a portion of the A337 in 1935; the section in Lyndhurst is part of the town's A35 one-way system.
A3070	Unused		Formerly connected the A35 southeast of Axminster with Lyme Regis via Uplyme; now downgraded to the southernmost section of the B3165.
A3071	Penzance	St Just in Penwith	Originally ran along Stony Lane in Axminster. Although the road was still shown as an unnumbered A road on maps into the 1960s, the number had been reused in Cornwall in 1935 with the original route becoming a spur of the A373 or A358 (former A374). Now downgraded to a portion of the B3261.
A3072	Bickleigh	Bude	
A3073	Stratton, Cornwall	Bude	Originally ran from Exeter Inn to Bampton, formerly a section of the A396. Returned to the A396 in the 1935 renumbering, but as a spur; downgraded to a portion of the B3227 after the A361 was downgraded.
A3074	Lelant	St Ives	
A3075	Trevemper, Newquay	Chiverton Cross, Blackwater	
A3076	Mitchell	Gunmows Shop, St Newlyn East	
A3077	Unused		Ran from the A30 west of Penzance to the A30 at Trereife; formerly the B3314 from Penzance to Newlyn while the link to Trereife was the southern section of the B3316. The Penzance-Newlyn section is now unclassified while the remainder became a portion of the B3315.
A3078	Probus	St Mawes	Originally used for the Plymouth northern bypass; originally the B3246. Renumbered A374 in 1935 and then became a portion of the A38 in the 1960s when the Tamar Bridge opened. Much of route now the B3413 after the A38 was rerouted, although the two ends are unclassified.
A3079	Okehampton	Holsworthy	A3079 was previously used for the road from A30 northeast to Ilminster, which became part of the then-new A303 when that route was created
A3080	Unused		Ran along Bathwick Street in Bath, forming a shortcut between the A4 and A36. Now a spur of the A4 or A36, depending on direction of travel, although maps and the local council claim it as a spur of the A36.
A3081	Unused		Renumbering of the eastern half of the B3241 in Plymouth. Downgraded to the B3214, probably around the same time the A386 was rerouted.
A3082	St Blazey	Fowey	
A3083	Helston	Lizard	
A3084	Unused		First used in south Cornwall between Par and Holmbush along the westernmost section of the B3271 (much of which became the A3082 except for this section), but it became a portion of the A3082 anyway in 1935. Used a second time in 1937 as a temporary number for the northern section of the Exeter Bypass (renumbered from the A378), but it became the A38 in 1938 when it was rerouted (old A38 became the A3085). Used a final time in 1975 between Redhills and Alphington on the western edge of Exeter. Declassified in the late 1970s when the A30 western bypass was built.
A3085	Unused		Original routing of the A38 in Exeter before it was rerouted on top of the A3084. The northern section is now mostly the B3212 and much of the multiplex is now pedestrianized. The section from the River Exe to the northern edge of Alphington is now the A377, the route into Alphington itself is now the B3123 and the remainder unclassified. The southern end is now gone, lost under the A30 bypass.
A3086	Unused		Location unknown, but since the A3095 was created in 1935 this clearly did exist. This may have been a short-lived road from Andover to Micheldever (upgrade of the B3049; became part of the A303).
A3087	Firepool, Taunton	Rowbarton, Taunton	Also known as the NIDR (Northern Inner Distributor Road). Previously allocated to a road from the A36 (now Tollgate Road) via Rampart Road to the A30 (now Winchester Street) in Salisbury.
A3088	Yeovil	Stoke-sub-Hamdon	Partly follows the trackbed of the Yeovil to Taunton railway line (closed 1964).
A3089	Unused		Location unknown, but since the A3095 was created in 1935 this clearly did exist. This may have been on the road that became part of the A303 as shown in the A3086 entry above.
A3090	Near Winchester	Near Totton	Formerly part of the A31. Before this, the A3090 was allocated to the road from the A31 through Winchester to the A33; this became the B3040 and an extension of the B3047, and the A3090 was reused on the current route.
A3091	Unused		Ran via Sussex Street and City Road from High Street (then the A272) to Hyde Street (then the A3090) in Winchester. Downgraded in 1995 due to completion of the M3 over Twyford Down; Sussex Street is now the southern end of the B3420 and City Road is the western end of the B3330.
A3092	Unused		Ran on Eastgate Street, Union Street, North Walls from The Broadway (then the A31) to Hyde Street (then the A3090) in Winchester as an upgrade of the B3044. Downgraded in 1995 due to completion of the M3 over Twyford Down and is now part of the B3330.
A3093	Andover	Andover	
A3094	Harnham	Quidhampton	Forms a southern ring-road around Salisbury
A3095	Sandhurst	Bracknell	
~~A3096 - A3097~~			Unused
A3098	Frome	Westbury	
~~A3099~~			Unused

== Four-digit roads (31xx and higher) ==
Road	From	To	Notes
A3100	Burpham	Milford	Formerly the A3 before the Guildford and Godalming bypass was built. Originally allocated to the Guildford Bypass; renumbered to the A3 in 1934 when the remainder of the bypass was completed (the old route of the A3 became the current A3100). Now part of the A25 after a further A3 bypass was built.
~~A3101~~			Unused
A3102	Swindon	Melksham	Former A420 and B3102
~~A3103~~ - ~~A3109~~			Unused
A3110	Parting Carn, St Mary's	Parting Carn	Circular road on St Mary's island
A3111	Hugh Town	Parting Carn	The most westerly classified road in England
A3112	The Parade, Hugh Town, St Mary's	Parting Carn/St Mary's Airport	The most southerly classified road in the United Kingdom
A3113	M25 J14	Heathrow Airport	
~~A3114~~ - ~~A3120~~			Unused
A3121	Wrangaton	Ermington	Formerly B3210. Also uses parts of the former B3196.
A3122	Halwell	Dartmouth	Formerly part of B3207
A3123	Combe Martin	Ilfracombe	Formerly part of B3343
A3124	Whiddon Down, Drewsteignton	Great Torrington	Formerly part of B3220 and unclassified roads
A3125	Barnstaple	Barnstaple	Formerly part of A39
A3126	Tiverton	Tiverton	Formerly part of A396
~~A3127~~ - ~~A3199~~			Unused
A3200	London Bridge	County Hall	Southwark Street/Stamford Street/York Road
A3201	A300 Southwark Bridge Road	The Borough	Marshalsea Road
A3202	Lambeth North station	The Borough	
A3203	Lambeth Bridge	St George's Circus	Lambeth Road
A3204	Elephant & Castle	Vauxhall Cross	Kennington Lane, part of the London Inner Ring Road
A3205	Vauxhall	Battersea	In the London Borough of Lambeth: Nine Elms Lane; in the London Borough of Wandsworth: Nine Elms Lane, Battersea Park Road
A3206			Ran from A3205 to A3212 in Battersea. Became a portion of the A205 (now A3220).
A3207	York Road, Battersea	Lavender Hill, Battersea	Falcon Road
A3208			Ran on Wandsworth Bridge Road in Wandsworth from the A308 to the A3205. Now part of the A217.
A3209	Wandsworth	Putney Bridge	
A3210	A240 in Surbiton	A243 in Surbiton	Short link road. Previously allocated to Wildcroft Road and Portsmouth Road in Putney Heath. Declassified and now just a footpath.
A3211	Westminster	Tower of London	
A3212	Trafalgar Square	Chelsea	Whitehall, then Millbank and following the north of the Thames along the Chelsea Embankment to Battersea Bridge. The Houses Of Parliament are on this road.
A3213	Pimlico	Eaton Square	Previously allocated to a road in Pall Mall, London. A 1926 MoT map shows the route as part of a rerouted A4, but a later OS 1951 map still shows the route as A3213. Now part of the A4.
A3214	Buckingham Palace	Royal Hospital Chelsea	
A3215	A3214 in Buckingham Palace	A302 in Buckingham Palace	
A3216	Knightsbridge	Clapham Common	In the City of Westminster: Sloane Street, Sloane Square, Chelsea Bridge Road, Chelsea Bridge; in the London Borough of Wandsworth: Chelsea Bridge, Queenstown Road (including Queen's Circus); in the London Borough of Lambeth: Queenstown Road, Cedars Road
A3217	Victoria	Chelsea	
A3218	South Kensington	Fulham	Old Brompton Road, Lillie Road
A3219	Fulham	Fulham	Dawes Road
A3220	Clapham Common	White City	
A3221			Ran along Fairfield Street between the A3205 and the A3 in Wandsworth. Now part of the A3, although it is labeled as the A217 on some maps.
~~A3222~~ - ~~A3258~~			Unused
A3259	Staplegrove	Monkton Heathfield	Formerly part of the A361.
~~A3260~~ - ~~A3279~~			Unused
A3280			Listed in the 2005 DfT road list as connecting the A259 and A27 in West Sussex. Possibly a typo for the A280.
~~A3281~~ - ~~A3289~~			Unused
A3290	Winnersh	Reading	Former western section of the A329(M).
~~A3291~~ - ~~A3299~~			Unused
A3393	Unused		Ran from the A36 (now Fishoerton Street) in Salisbury along the Salisbury ring road northeast to the A30 as an upgrade of the B3393. Now part of a rerouted A36.
A3400	Hockley Heath	Near Chipping Norton	Out-of-zone as it runs in Zone 4, but intentionally chosen as a reminder of the former A34 designation.
A3604	Bath	Bath	
A3611	Reserved		Reserved for a road in Trowbridge from 2006.
A3807	A38 in Taunton	A3027 in Taunton	
A3822	A38 in Plymouth	A386 in Plymouth	Part of the new Forder Valley West link road, opened in February 2023; former portion of the B3413. Originally planned to be numbered as A3861 before it was changed to A3822 for unknown reasons.
A3860	A386 in Plymouth	Tamar Science Park	Shown on OS maps from 2019, but is unsigned nor does it appear on internet maps. Initially thought to be a copyright trap or a typo, but Plymouth Council has confirmed that the route does indeed exist.

== Notes and references ==
Notes
