= T9 =

T9 may refer to:

== Military ==
- M4 cannon, the 37 mm Automatic Gun, known as the T9 during development
- M22 Locust, an airborne light tank, known as the T9 during development
- German torpedo boat T9

== People ==
- Tech N9ne (born 1971), hip hop artist
- Fernando Torres (born 1984), former footballer nicknamed "T9"

== Physiology ==
- Thoracic vertebra 9
- Thoracic spinal nerve 9

== Products ==
- Sony Cyber-shot DSC-T9, a digital camera
- Yepp, the Samsung YP-T9 MP3 player
- T-9, a Ford manual transmission also known as Type 9

== Transportation ==
- Tramway T9, a tram line in Île-de-France
- Former IATA code for TransMeridian Airlines
- T9 Northern Line, a rail service in Sydney, Australia
- LSWR T9 class, a British locomotive class
- Prussian T 9, a German steam locomotive
- Van Hool T9, a line of touring buses
- T9 road (Tanzania), a road in Tanzania
- JAC T9 Ute, a Chinese mid-size pickup truck

== Other uses ==
- T9 (predictive text), an input technology for mobile phones
- T9, a fluorescent lamp tube format designation
- A tornado intensity rating on the TORRO scale
- Diethyltryptamine (DET; developmental code name T-9), a serotonergic psychedelic
- Cooper T9, a British single seater racing car: see Cooper Mark III

== See also ==
- 9T (disambiguation)
