= Hightown =

Hightown may refer to:

== Places ==
=== United Kingdom ===
- Hightown, Hampshire
- Hightown, Merseyside
  - Hightown railway station
- Hightown, West Yorkshire
- Hightown, Belfast, in UK Parliament constituency Belfast North
- Hightown, County Antrim, a townland in County Antrim, Northern Ireland
- Hightown, Wrexham, Wales

=== United States ===
- Hightown, Virginia, an unincorporated village in Highland County

== Other uses ==
- Hightown (TV series), a 2020–2024 American crime drama series
- Hightown, a wealthy precinct in the fictional city-island of Madripoor in X-Men

== See also ==
- High Town (disambiguation)
