= Bear Cross =

Suburb of Bournemouth, England

Coordinates: 50.769°N 1.918°W

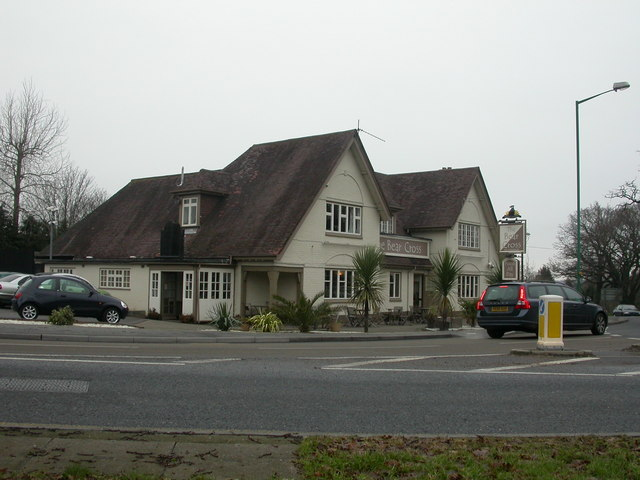
- The Bear Cross

- Location within Dorset
- OS grid reference: SZ057966
- Unitary authority: Bournemouth, Christchurch and Poole
- Ceremonial county: Dorset
- Region: South West
- Country: England
- Sovereign state: United Kingdom
- Post town: BOURNEMOUTH
- Postcode district: BH11
- Dialling code: 01202
- Police: Dorset
- Fire: Dorset and Wiltshire
- Ambulance: South Western
- UK Parliament: Bournemouth West

Bear Cross is a suburb on the north-western edge of Bournemouth, Dorset, taking its name from the crossroads made by the main road (A348) between Poole and Ringwood and the Wimborne Road/Magna Road (A341).

== Etymology ==
Long prior to any settlement taking place, this area was known as 'Beare Bottom', 'Beare' deriving from the Old English bearū (meaning 'woodland') and 'Bottom' simply denoting the area's location at the bottom of the Stour Valley. Strips of ancient woodland or bearū still survive and these gave rise, after 1925, to the tautological place-name Bearwood, denoting the suburban area immediately west of Bear Cross.

It was once maintained that the name ‘Bear Cross’ commemorated a bear pit or bear-baiting post in the vicinity. More recent research suggests that this story only dates from 1970, when the origins of local toponyms were being discussed in Bournemouth's Evening Echo. This story nevertheless gave rise to the image of a bear in chains which still adorns the Bear Cross pub sign, and which also features in the badge associated with the local Oakmead College of Technology.

== Early settlement ==
Though the ancient hamlets of East Howe, High Howe and West Howe lay to the south, with a farming hamlet called Cudnel to the east, settlement at Bear Cross itself only began after 1756 when the main route from Poole to Ringwood was diverted to its present position – that of the A348, or Ringwood Road. (It was this development which effectively created Bear Cross.) Prior to the cutting of this road, travellers between Poole and Ringwood would have been obliged to follow a circuitous route via Kinson (and thence to Longham), but this route had fallen into neglect by the eighteenth century and a straighter route was in any case considered more desirable. Work on the new route was orchestrated by the Poole Turnpike Trust, the new road initially operating as a toll road.

== The Bear Cross pub ==
The Bear Cross pub was put up in 1931–2, replacing a previous hostelry which had variously been known as 'The Bear Cross Inn' or 'The Brickmaker's Arms'. The first licensee of this earlier hostelry, George Ware, worked as a brickmaker by day, as did most local inhabitants, as the ferruginous clays of the area had given rise to a flourishing brickmaking industry by the mid-nineteenth century. On Ware's death in 1883 the inn's licence passed to the Lane family, among them Frank Lane, who worked as a carpenter by day and built coffins for the Gypsy community on nearby Alderney Common. His son Arthur Lane was born above The Bear Cross Inn in 1913, and could recall Augustus John – who lived at Alderney Manor between 1911 and 1927 - spending 'rumbustious' evenings on the premises, plus similar evenings at The Shoulder of Mutton in West Howe.

== Wimborne Road ==
The longest road in Bournemouth, Wimborne Road, ends at the Bear Cross roundabout. House numbers reach 1714 on the even side and 1823 on the odd.
