= 3060 =

3060 may refer to:

- 3060, a number in the 3000 (number) range
- A.D. 3060, a year of the 4th millennium CE
- 3060 BC, a year in the 4th millennium BCE

== Roads numbered 3060 ==
- Hawaii Route 3060, a state highway
- Louisiana Highway 3060, a state highway
- Texas Farm to Market Road 3060, a state highway
- A3060 road in the UK

== Other uses ==
- 3060 Delcano, an asteroid in the Asteroid Belt, the 3060th asteroid registered
- RTX 3060 graphics card
