= Trickett's Cross =

Suburb of Ferndown, Dorset, England

Coordinates: 50.8103°N 1.8736°W

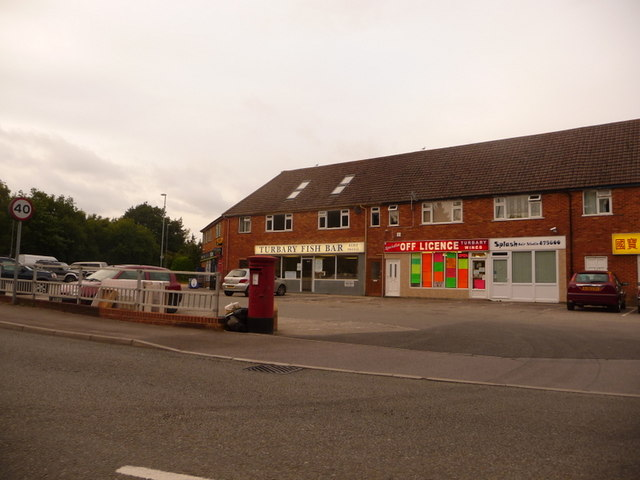
- Shops at Trickett's Cross

- Location within Dorset
- OS grid reference: SU090012
- Civil parish: Ferndown
- Unitary authority: Dorset
- Ceremonial county: Dorset
- Region: South West
- Country: England
- Sovereign state: United Kingdom
- Post town: FERNDOWN
- Postcode district: BH22
- Dialling code: 01202
- Police: Dorset
- Fire: Dorset and Wiltshire
- Ambulance: South Western
- UK Parliament: Christchurch

Trickett's Cross is an estate situated on the outskirts of Ferndown, Dorset, England. It lies at the junction of two primary routes, the A31 road and A348 road. It has a church and a youth centre which runs clubs, such as scouts and a Jitsu club.

== Origins ==
Trickett's Cross, formerly part of the parish of West Parley, is thought to have taken its name from George Trickett (c. 1834–1905), a nurseryman's labourer, listed at '1 Branch Road' on the 1871 West Parley census. Branch Road was the name of the road branching off towards Wimborne Minster (now known as 'Wimborne Road East'), converging with the main Poole to Ringwood at the point where Trickett set up home. As of 1871, the only other inhabitant of the district was Job Samuel Hames (1841-1909), also a nurseryman, and both men were listed side by side on successive censuses to 1901. It is likely they were employed at the 'Fern Down Nursery', marked just west of their two respective properties on maps from the 1880s.

The first specific reference to 'Trickett's Cross' appears to have come in the 1901 census, at which point the district comprised three households (including those of Hames and Trickett). A general store, run by the Soffe family, was set up here around 1909.

In the centre of the estate is the Heatherland's Community Centre, attached to which is the recently extended Hopscotch Preschool which offers preschool provision from 2 years old.

== Ecology ==
Trickett's Cross is surrounded by heathland which is the home to rare lizards and the adder. The heathland has had many fires in recent years.
