= Picket Post =

Service area in the New Forest, Hampshire, England

Coordinates: 50.8543°N 1.7287°W

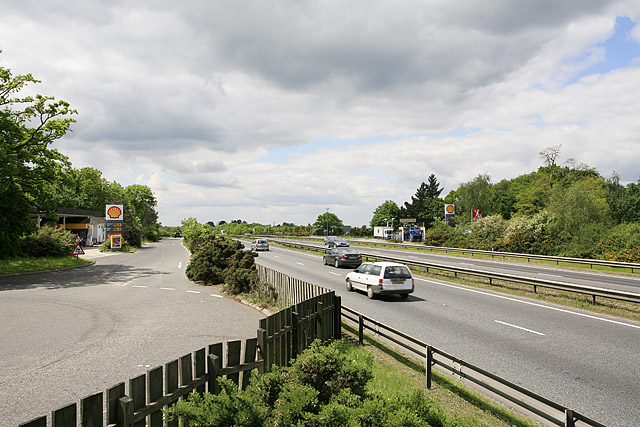

- Location within Hampshire
- OS grid reference: SU191061
- District: New Forest
- Shire county: Hampshire
- Region: South East
- Country: England
- Sovereign state: United Kingdom
- Post town: RINGWOOD
- Postcode district: BH24 3
- Police: Hampshire and Isle of Wight
- Fire: Hampshire and Isle of Wight
- Ambulance: South Central
- UK Parliament: New Forest West

Picket Post is a road junction and service area in the New Forest National Park of Hampshire, England. It lies on the A31 road.

== Facilities ==
Picket Post is located on the A31 dual carriageway which passes through the New Forest. It is situated 2.5 miles from the A338 at Ringwood and 8 miles from Junction 1 of the M27 at Cadnam. A minor road to the village of Burley joins with the A31 at Picket Post. There is a roadside service area on both sides of the dual carriageway.

Picket Post is the location of a cricket ground for Ellingham cricket club, and there is a rugby training pitch next to it.

== History ==
Picket Post was once an important junction of the toll road to Poole with the road to Burley and Lymington. The name derives from a picket (i.e. a post) which marked the spot, but it may have acquired a second meaning from a picket of soldiers stationed at a strategic point on the smugglers's route. There was an inn here for most of the 19th century, which around 1900 became a tea house whose sign was a large golden kettle - it was demolished in 1969.
