= 1952 Ibsley Grand Prix =

1952 Ibsley Formula 2 Race
- Non-championship race in the 1952 Formula One season

Race details
- Date: 19 April 1952
- Official name: I Ibsley Formula 2 Race
- Location: Ibsley, Dorset, UK
- Course: Ibsley Circuit
- Course length: 3.412 km (2.127 miles)
- Distance: 6 laps, 51.18 km (31.91 miles)

Pole position
Driver	(United Kingdom) George Abecassis	HWM-Alta

Fastest lap
Driver	(United Kingdom) George Abecassis	HWM-Alta
- Time: 1:38.4

Podium
First	(United Kingdom) Mike Hawthorn	Cooper-Bristol
Second	(United Kingdom) George Abecassis	HWM-Alta
Third	(United Kingdom) Bill Dobson	Ferrari

The 1st Ibsley Formula 2 Race was a non-championship Formula Two motor race held at Ibsley Circuit, Ibsley, Dorset on 19 April 1952. The race was won by Mike Hawthorn in a Cooper T20-Bristol. George Abecassis was second and set fastest lap in an HWM-Alta and Bill Dobson in a Ferrari 125 was third.

== Results ==
Pos	No	Driver	Entrant	Car	Time/Retired	Grid
1	122	(United Kingdom) Mike Hawthorn	R.J. Chase	Cooper T20-Bristol	25:03.0, 76.43mph	2
2	118	(United Kingdom) George Abecassis	HW Motors Ltd.	HWM-Alta	+5.6s	1
3	119	(United Kingdom) Bill Dobson	Scuderia Ambrosiana	Ferrari 125	+1:16.0	3
4	82	(United Kingdom) Rodney Peacock	Rodney Peacock	Frazer Nash Le Mans Replica-Bristol		8
5	123	(United Kingdom) Rex Woodgate	Rex Woodgate	Alta F2		4
6	114	(United Kingdom) Jimmy Stewart	Jimmy Stewart	Cooper T12-JAP		6
Ret	117	(United Kingdom) John Barber	John Barber	Cooper T12-JAP	spark plug	5
Ret	110	(United Kingdom) Norman Pugh	Ecurie Pughey	Cooper T12-JAP		9
Ret	83	(United Kingdom) Roy Salvadori	Tony Crook	Frazer Nash Le Mans Replica-Bristol	0 laps, accident	7
DNA	85	(United Kingdom) Lawrence Mitchell	Lawrence Mitchell	Frazer Nash High Speed-Bristol		-
DNA	111	(United Kingdom) Kenneth McAlpine	Kenneth McAlpine	Connaught A Type-Lea Francis	car not ready	-
DNA	112	(United Kingdom) Oliver Simpson	Oliver Simpson	Alta F2		-
DNA	113	(United Kingdom) Noel Johnson	Mike Christie Racing Stable	Cooper T12-JAP		-
DNA	115	(United Kingdom) Bill Black	W.B. Black	Connaught A Type-Lea Francis		-
DNA	116	(United Kingdom) Ray Merrick	Ray Merrick	Cooper T12-JAP		-
DNA	120	(United Kingdom) John Norton	H.W. Norton	Cooper T12-JAP		-
DNA	121	(United Kingdom) Peter Whitehead	Peter Whitehead	Ferrari 125		-

Previous race: 1952 Pau Grand Prix	Formula One non-championship races 1952 season	Next race: 1952 Marseille Grand Prix
Previous race: —	Ibsley Grand Prix	Next race: —
