= 9T =

9T or 9-T may refer to:

- 9T, IATA code for Transwest Air
- Yak-9T, a model of Yakovlev Yak-9
- ZH-79-9T, a model of gun; see Makarych
- R nineT, a model of motorcycle; see BMW R nineT

== See also ==
- T9 (disambiguation)
