= Poulner =

Village in Hampshire, England

Coordinates: 50.8485°N 1.7649°W

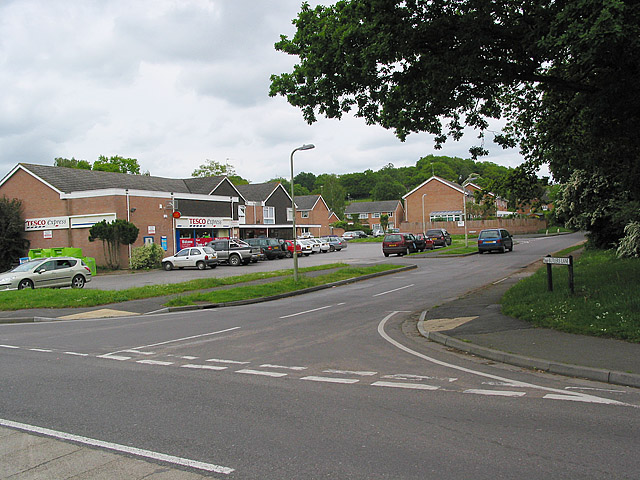
- Shops at Poulner

- Location within Hampshire
- OS grid reference: SU166055
- Civil parish: Ringwood
- District: New Forest
- Shire county: Hampshire
- Region: South East
- Country: England
- Sovereign state: United Kingdom
- Post town: RINGWOOD
- Postcode district: BH24 3
- Dialling code: 01425
- Police: Hampshire and Isle of Wight
- Fire: Hampshire and Isle of Wight
- Ambulance: South Central
- UK Parliament: New Forest West

Poulner (/'paʊnə/) is a small village in the civil parish of Ringwood in the New Forest district, in Hampshire, England, although its northern fringe lies in the adjacent civil parish of Ellingham, Harbridge and Ibsley. It is 1 mile (1.6 km) east from the town centre of Ringwood.

Poulner is recorded as Polenore in 1300, Polenoure in 1327, Pulnore in 1410, and Powner in 1682. The origin of the name is uncertain, but the second element "ora" or "ofer" means "bank, slope", probably referring to the escarpment now known as Poulner Hill that lies to its east, and the first element might be "polleie" meaning the popular herb "pennyroyal".

At one time Poulner was a separate settlement from Ringwood - however 20th century development of housing in the fields and small-holdings that once lay between Poulner and Ringwood have made Poulner effectively a suburb of Ringwood. Today Poulner has a row of shops including a Tesco Express containing a post office, two pubs, a medical centre with an attached pharmacy, two primary schools, a small Anglican church and a Baptist chapel, a Scout group, and an amateur dramatics society called Poulner Players.

The site of Royal Air Force Station Ibsley, in use during World War II, is located on the outskirts of Poulner to the north. This site has later been used for motor-racing as Ibsley Circuit and today is a quarry lake area.
