= Ringwood Waldorf School =

Location
- Folly Farm Lane; Ashley, Hampshire, BH24 2NN; England; 50.84313°N 1.80891°W

Information
- Type: Independent School Waldorf School
- Established: 1974
- Founder: Christine Polyblank
- Department for Education URN: 113943 Tables
- Ofsted: Reports
- Head teacher: College of Teachers
- Gender: Co-educational
- Age: 3 to 18
- Website: http://ringwoodwaldorfschool.org.uk/

Ringwood Waldorf School is an Independent School for 3-18 year olds located on the edge of the New Forest, near the Dorset and Hampshire border. Established in 1974, the school was founded on the principles of Waldorf education and follows a unique curriculum that aligns learning with children's natural developmental stages. This approach cultivates a lifelong love of learning and prepares students to meet the challenges of an evolving world with confidence and purpose.

== History ==
Ringwood Waldorf School was founded in 1974 by Christine Polyblank after Alex Baum from the Camphill Movement Sheiling School invited her to establish a Waldorf school for the children of the co-workers. The school started with just six pupils in a row of cottages at Folly Farm and quickly expanded, moving into temporary buildings as more families joined.

By the late 1980s, the school relocated to its permanent site on Folly Farm Lane, expanding to offer Kindergarten through to Lower School. In 1986, architect and builder Keir Polyblank took responsibility for developing the new school site.

== Campus ==
Today Ringwood Waldorf School has a purpose built campus, with four kindergartens, 12 classrooms, an art studio, science lab and multi-purpose hall as well as some dedicated rooms for special activities such as Music, Handwork, Woodwork and Eurythmy. It offers an education from Kindergarten to Upper School for children aged 3 to 18 years.

The school sits on the edge of the New Forest and can be accessed by foot and bicycle on the popular Castleman Trailway. This direct access to the forest allows students to engage closely with the natural world, enriching their learning and sense of place.

The school shares the site with the Lantern Community a Camphill Movement initiative. The Lantern café and shop are a friendly spot where parents can meet and connect, helping to build a warm, supportive community around the school.

== Curriculum ==
Ringwood Waldorf School follows the Waldorf curriculum, a unique framework that aligns learning with children's natural developmental stages. This holistic approach to education cultivates curiosity and inspires both academic engagement and creative expression. By fostering a classroom teaching style grounded in child development, teachers can adapt to the diverse needs of their students and engage with each child individually to ignite their personal love for learning.

Children can attend Ringwood Waldorf School for their whole school journey. The Parent and Child group welcomes children from birth to 4 years, Kindergartens from 3 to 6 years, Lower School from 6 to 14 years and Upper School from 14 to 18 years.

Upper School students follow the Waldorf curriculum while working towards Level 2 and 3 Integrative Education Certificates and Diplomas, accredited by Crossfields Institute and regulated by Ofqual. These qualifications, equivalent to GCSEs and A-levels, provide a rigorous education and the opportunity to earn UCAS points. Students also take GCSEs in English Language and Mathematics, ensuring a well-rounded and internationally recognised qualification.

== Extracurricular activities ==
=== Comenius School Partnership Programme ===
Supported and funded by the British Council and the European Commission, this is a two-year project in which the school invites foreign teachers and students to a programme of activities. Ringwood Waldorf School pupils also visit schools in Spain, Germany, Italy, Turkey and Estonia to learn drama, circus skills and sculpture.

=== International Summer School ===
The school teams up with the Lewis School of English to offer an International Summer School. It is based at the Ringwood Waldorf School and offers purpose-built classrooms, a large theatre, gymnasium, workshops for dance, arts and craft activities and access to nearby fields and forest and to Ringwood, a historic market town on the edge of the New Forest National Park.
