= High Town =

High Town may refer to:

- High Town, Luton, Bedfordshire, England
- High Town, Hereford, Herefordshire, England
- Part of Bridgnorth, Shropshire, England
- High Town, South Hampton, New Hampshire, U.S.

== See also ==
- Hightown (disambiguation)
