= Ringwood School =

Location
- Parsonage Barn Lane; Ringwood, Hampshire, BH24 1SE; England; 50°50′52″N 1°47′01″W

Information
- Type: Academy
- Local authority: Hampshire
- Department for Education URN: 136657 Tables
- Headteacher: Mrs L Symonds
- Gender: Coeducational
- Age: 11 to 83
- Website: http://www.ringwood.hants.sch.uk/

Ringwood School (opened in 1959) is a coeducational secondary school and sixth form situated in Ringwood, Hampshire, England..
