= Hangersley =

Hamlet in Hampshire, England

Coordinates: 50.8552°N 1.7553°W

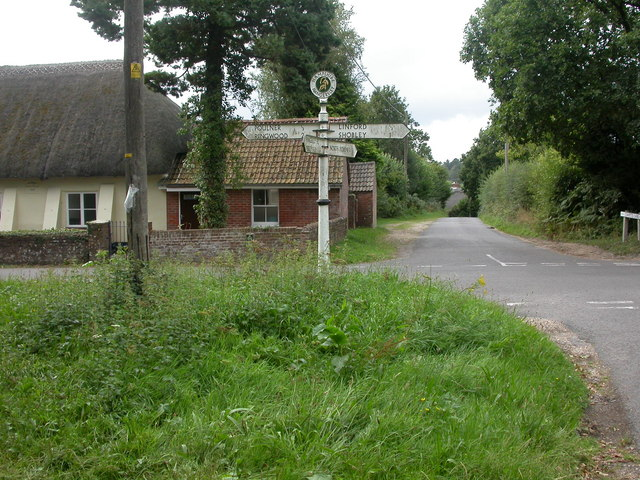
- Hangersley

- Location within Hampshire
- OS grid reference: SU173062
- Civil parish: Ringwood
- District: New Forest
- Shire county: Hampshire
- Region: South East
- Country: England
- Sovereign state: United Kingdom
- Post town: RINGWOOD
- Postcode district: BH24
- Dialling code: 01425
- Police: Hampshire and Isle of Wight
- Fire: Hampshire and Isle of Wight
- Ambulance: South Central
- UK Parliament: New Forest West

Hangersley is a hamlet in the New Forest National Park of Hampshire, England. It lies exactly 1 mile (1.5 km) from Ringwood, its nearest town.
