= Cooper Mark IV =

Racing car

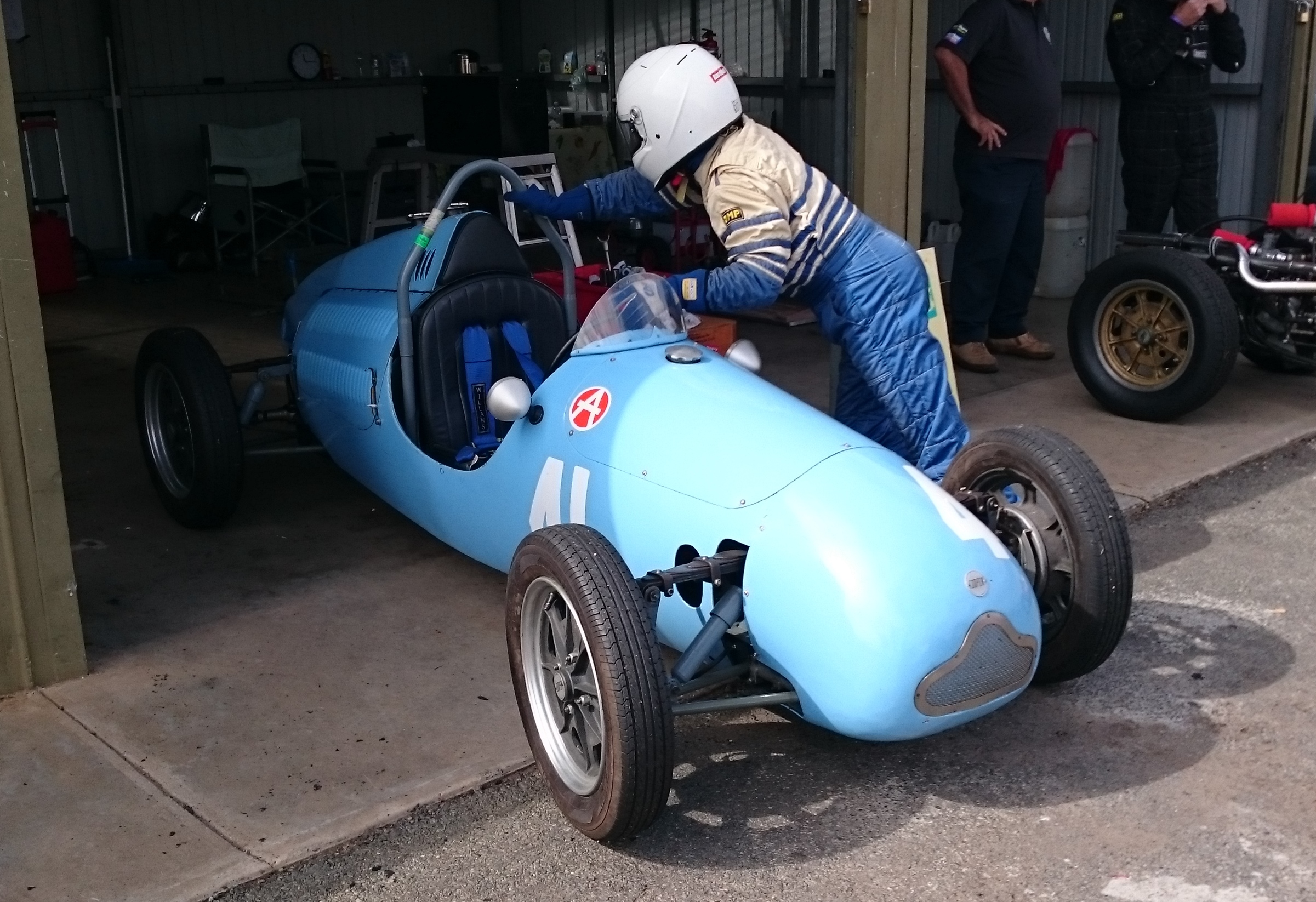
- Category: Formula One; Formula Two; Formula Three
- Constructor: Cooper Car Company

Technical specifications
- Suspension: Fiat 500 transverse leaf spring independent suspension

Competition history

The Cooper Mark IV was a Formula Three, Formula Two and Formula One racing car designed and built by the Cooper Car Company at Surbiton, Surrey, England, in 1950.

Following the adoption of the 500cc formula for F3 in 1949, Cooper evolved the Mark III to use a 500 cc (31 cu in) JA Prestwich Industries (JAP) single.

The ladder frame was retained, with the aluminium body supported by hoops. Lockheed twin-shoe disc brakes became standard, coupled to two master cylinders. The suspension was Fiat 500 transverse leaf spring independent suspension, used at front and rear.

== History ==
The Mark IV came in a standard version (T11) for F3, and long-wheelbase (T12) variant for F2. Standard for the T11 was a 498 cc (30.4 cu in) one-cylinder Speedway JAP engine. The T12 was powered by a 1000cc engine. The first 500 modified with a 1000cc JAP twin was prepared by customer Spike Rhiando in 1948. In 1949, a model powered by the 1,250 cc (76 cu in) engine from an MG TD was built, and won on its first outing. Cliff Davis was the most successful driver to campaign one.

Cars were supplied without engines, which the customer provided. (This would become routine in Formula One in later years.) The T12s were best-suited for hillclimbs and sprints, not being durable enough for longer events.

The F2 Mark IV, based on the TD-engined variant, appeared in 1952. It was powered by a 127 hp (95 kW) 1,971 cc (120.3 cu in) Bristol inline six, giving up 50 hp (37 kW) to the Ferraris. At just 1,000 lb (450 kg), they were 400 lb (180 kg) lighter than the Ferraris, and had better cornering due to their mid-mounted engines. It made its debut at Goodwood on Easter Monday, run by Eric Brandon and Alan Brown (for Ecurie Richmond) and Mike Hawthorn (driving for Bob Chase). Hawthorn won the Formula Two event and one of the two Formula Libre races, and came second behind González' 4½ l Ferrari in another Libre outing. It was the first mid-engined entrant in Formula Two, and only the second marque in top-rank European racing, following Auto Union.

Mark IVs competed successfully in F2 throughout 1952 and 1953, driven by Hawthorn, Peter Collins, and of course John Cooper himself, among others. (Stirling Moss' unsuccessful Cooper-Alta was actually built by a different John Cooper, Autocar's sport editor.) In September 1950, Raymond Sommer died in a wreck at Cadours in a T12. It sold used at £425 in 1952.

Arthur Owen modified a Mark IV with a streamlined glassfibre body and 250cc Norton engine late in 1957. Bill Knight used this car to set five speed records at Monza.

== Cooper T12 ==
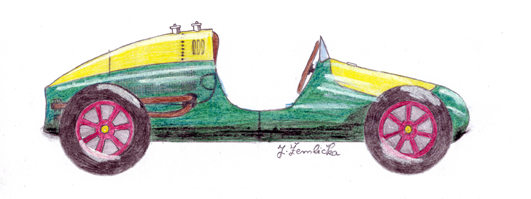
Cooper T12 drawing

The Cooper T12 was a Formula Two/Formula Three racing car produced by the Cooper Car Company.

The car was developed as the long chassis version of the Cooper Mk IV design, making it eligible to use in both F3 (with JAP 0.5 L engines) and F2 (with JAP 1.0/1.1 L engines).

In 1950 it made a single outing in a Formula One World Championship race, entered by Horschell Racing Corporation for Harry Schell at the Monaco Grand Prix, where he retired. It was also used by various privateers. Altogether it was used at 35 races, achieving two podium positions. Its only win was achieved by John Barber at the 500 Car Club Formula 2 Race.

=== Complete Formula One World Championship results ===
(key) (results in bold indicate pole position, results in italics indicate fastest lap)

Year	Team	Engine	Tyres	Drivers	1	2	3	4	5	6	7
1950	Horschell Racing Corporation	JAP 1.1 V2	**D**		GBR	MON	500	SUI	BEL	FRA	ITA
1950	Horschell Racing Corporation	JAP 1.1 V2	**D**	(United States) Harry Schell		Ret					

== Sources ==
- Kettlewell, Mike. "Cooper: Forerunner of the Modern Racing Car", in Northey, Tom, editor. World of Automobiles, Volume 4, pp. 427–433. London: Phoebus, 1974.
- racing-database.com statistics
