= Fleetsbridge =

Coordinates: 50.739°N 1.987°W

Fleetsbridge is a small area of Poole, Dorset, centred on a busy gyratory and flyover. It lies north of Poole town centre and borders the neighbouring suburbs of Waterloo, Creekmoor, Oakdale and Canford Heath. The use of land varies between residential, retail and some light industry. The area is also home to Parkstone Grammar School when it moved there from Lower Parkstone in 1962. The site of the Tesco at Fleets Corner was, up until the 1980s, the home of Hamworthy Recreation Football Club before the land was sold and the club moved to Canford Magna on the northern extreme of the Borough of Poole. Opposite to Tesco, across Waterloo Road, is the home of the headquarters of the global company, Hamworthy Combustion Engineering. Fleets Industrial Estate lies to the south of the gyratory off Fleets Lane and is adjacent to Wessex Gate Retail Park, which has large retail outlets such as DFS, Currys and PC World.

== Fleetsbridge Roundabout ==
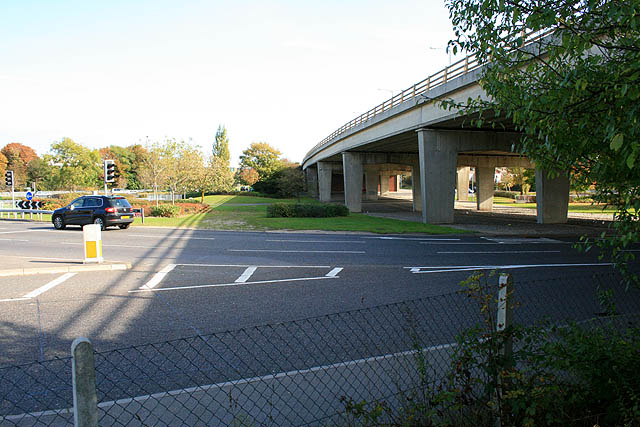
Fleet's Corner flyover and roundabout

=== The roundabout ===
The flyover itself forms part of Dorset Way which is a stretch of the A3049 that runs west to east from Poole to Boscombe in Bournemouth. Underneath one section of the bridge is a busy gyratory that has six routes leading on and off it. Waterloo Road is part of the A349 that goes to Wimborne Minster, and this is also access to the Tesco and the northern suburbs of Poole. There is a slip-road for traffic travelling onto the A3049 and parallel to this is the slip-road for traffic exiting the A3049. Wimborne Road is part of the A35 which is part of the main route into Poole from Fleetsbridge. Fleets Lane is a quieter road that allows access to Wessex Gate and Fleets Industrial Estate and eventually leads to Sterte and Poole town centre. The other road is Upton Road that is also part of the A35 and takes traffic west-bound out of Poole, as well as suburbs such as Creekmoor and Broadstone.

=== Roads converging into Fleetsbridge Roundabout ===
- Waterloo Road (A349)
- Wimborne Road (A35)
- Upton Road (A35)
- Fleets Lane
- Slip road to and from Dorset Way (A3049)

=== Broadstone Way ===
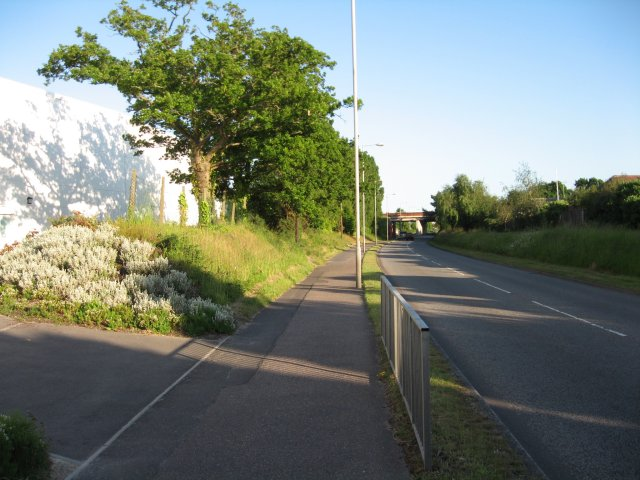
Broadstone Way

A smaller section of the bridge on the western side crosses over Broadstone Way, which is separated from the roundabout. This road also forms part of the A349. Upton Road also travels via bridge over Broadstone Way. Broadstone Way was originally the route of the railway line that ran from Poole to Broadstone and beyond. It was closed in the 1960s in line with the Beeching cuts to Britain's railways.

=== Buildings adjacent to the roundabout ===
- Tesco Extra
- Hamworthy Engineering
- Toby Carvery
- Aldi (previously Office Outlet and Wren Kitchens)

Although the Tesco itself is called Fleets Corner and the pub's address is Fleets Corner, they are both referred to locally as being "Fleetsbridge", for example "Tom Whitehead goes shopping at Fleetsbridge Tesco".
