= Crow, Hampshire =

Village in Hampshire, England

Coordinates: 50.8359°N 1.7591°W

Crow
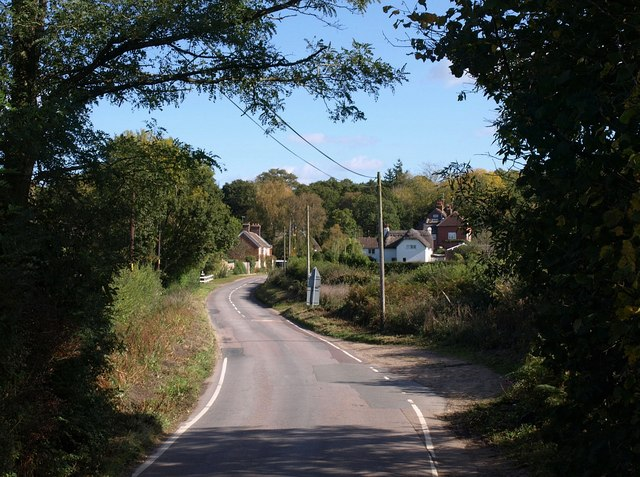
- Moortown Lane, Crow

- Location within Hampshire
- OS grid reference: SU171041
- Civil parish: Ringwood
- District: New Forest
- Shire county: Hampshire
- Region: South East
- Country: England
- Sovereign state: United Kingdom
- Post town: RINGWOOD
- Postcode district: BH24
- Dialling code: 01425
- Police: Hampshire and Isle of Wight
- Fire: Hampshire and Isle of Wight
- Ambulance: South Central
- UK Parliament: New Forest West

Crow is a small village situated in the New Forest National Park in Hampshire, England. Its nearest town is Ringwood, which lies approximately 1 mile (1.6 km) north-west from the village.

== History ==
The name "Crow" may be derived from an old Common Brittonic word, either "criw" meaning "ford, weir", or perhaps "craw" meaning "hovel". In the Domesday Book of 1086, Crow (Crone) was held by the sons of Godric Malf from the King. In the 13th and 14th centuries the manor was held at various times by John de Burley, Sir Hugh Cheyne, Sir John Berkeley, and Humphrey Duke of Gloucester. It was held by the Milbourne family in the 15th and 16th centuries until the death of Richard Milbourne in 1532. It was sold to William Button in 1543, and the manor stayed in the Button family at least until 1599. The manor subsequently passed to the Comptons of Minstead and Bisterne, and then with Bisterne to William Mills in 1792. The two manors of Bisterne and Crow were effectively merged from that time.
