= Brook, Test Valley =

Hamlet in Hampshire, England

Coordinates: 51.050000°N 1.516667°W

Brook
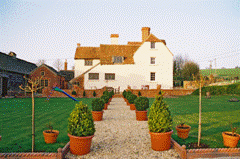
- The Brook Farm House

- Location within Hampshire
- OS grid reference: SU3397627961
- District: Test Valley
- Shire county: Hampshire
- Region: South East
- Country: England
- Sovereign state: United Kingdom
- Post town: Stockbridge
- Postcode district: SO20
- Dialling code: 01264
- Police: Hampshire and Isle of Wight
- Fire: Hampshire and Isle of Wight
- Ambulance: South Central
- UK Parliament: North West Hampshire

Brook is a small medieval hamlet situated 1–2 miles south of the village of King's Somborne in the Test Valley, Hampshire.

Brook features on a number of mediaeval maps of Hampshire and England, and has a significant population until the 17th century, when the population was decimated by the plague.

The most significant building in Brook today is Brook Farm House, an 18th-century farmhouse which may have been the manor house of the village. It is a Grade II listed building.
