= Transport in Dorset =

Overview of transport in English county

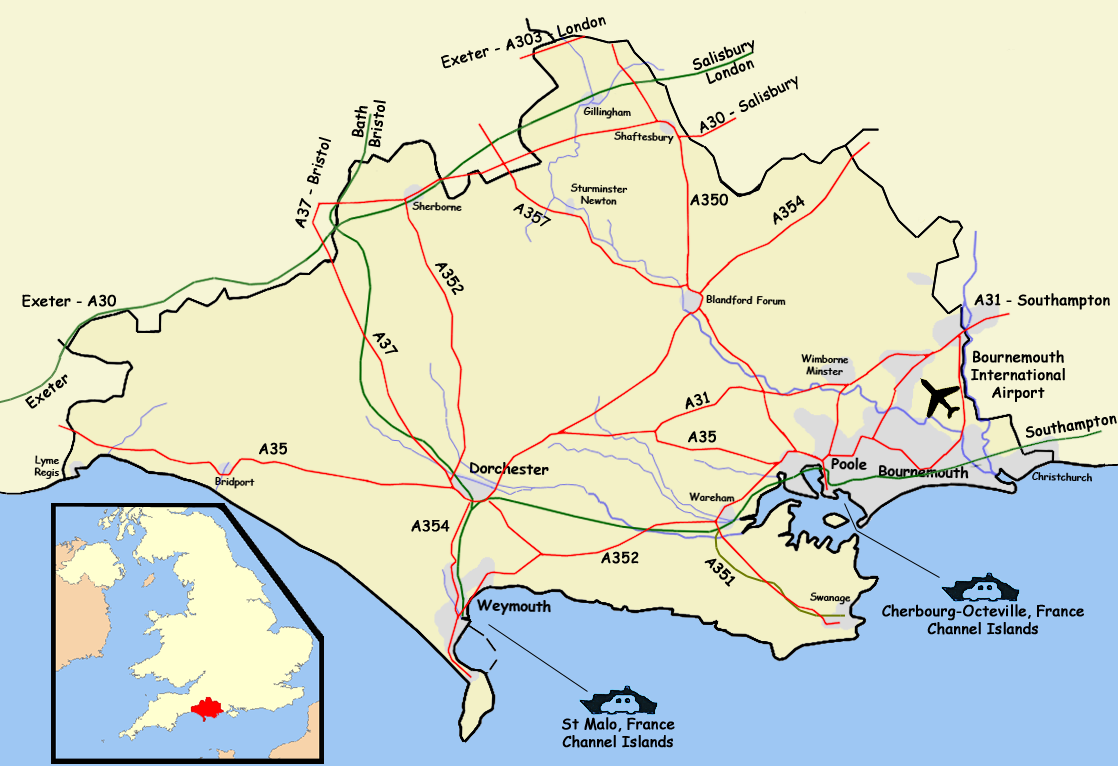
The main transport features in the county.

Dorset is a county in South West England. The county is largely rural and therefore does not have a dense transport network, and is one of the few English counties without a motorway. Owing to its position on the English Channel coast, and its natural sheltered harbours, it has a maritime history, though lack of inland transport routes has led to the decline of its ports.

== Rail ==
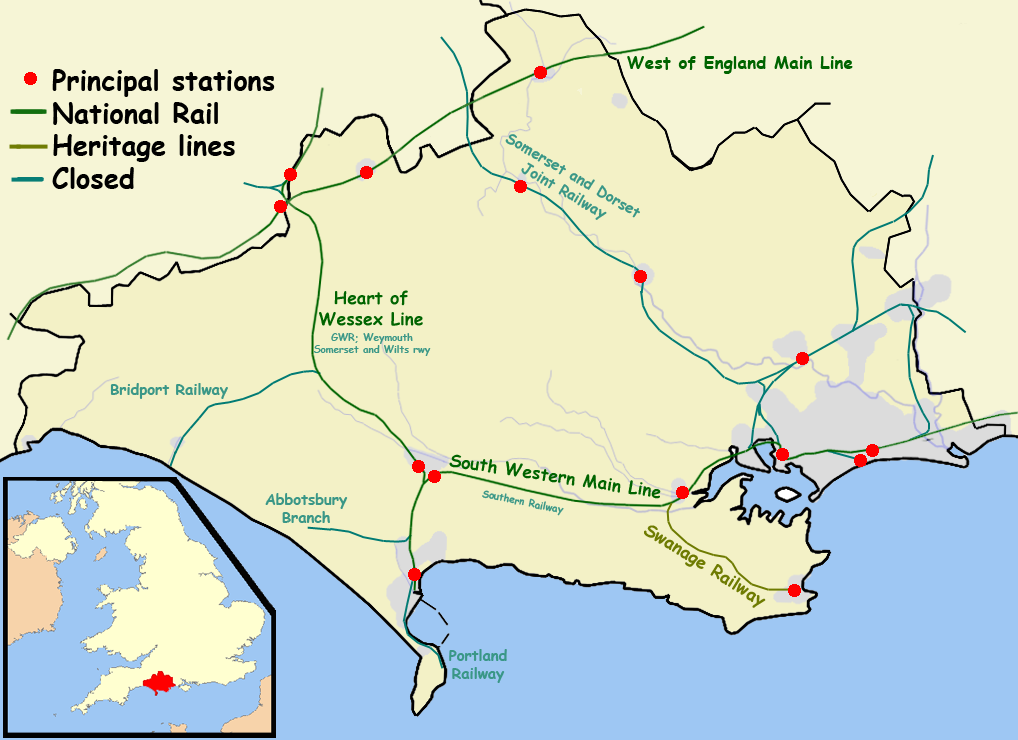
Dorset's railways, past and present.

Dorset is connected to London by two main railway lines. The West of England Main Line runs through the north of the county at Gillingham and Sherborne. The electric South West Main Line runs through the south of the county, at Bournemouth, Poole, Dorchester and the terminus at Weymouth, and was part of the London and South Western Railway (later Southern Railway). Additionally, a secondary line, the Heart of Wessex Line runs from Weymouth to Bristol, via Yeovil and Bath, in Somerset. This line was part of the Wilts, Somerset and Weymouth Railway (later Great Western Railway).

Railway closures in Dorset began with the West Bay line south of Bridport in the 1930s. Then lost in the 1950s were the branch lines to Abbotsbury and Portland. The Beeching Axe of the 1960s led to the closure of other Dorset lines, the Lyme Regis and Bridport branches. The latter remained open until 1975 although the Beeching report was published in 1963. The biggest loss was the entire Somerset and Dorset Joint Railway, between Bournemouth and Bath. Through Dorset, this line roughly followed the Stour Valley, serving the market towns of Blandford Forum and Sturminster Newton in the Blackmore Vale, and is being converted into a long-distance trail for cyclists and walkers. Another through line, the Salisbury and Dorset Junction Railway, roughly followed the Avon Valley from Bournemouth to Salisbury. With the closure of the lines which terminated in Bournemouth, the terminus station in the town centre was also closed, leaving only the through stations. The station at Semley on the West of England Main Line also closed. As this had been the nearest station to Shaftesbury, travellers from that town would have to use Gillingham, on the same line. An oddity is the Swanage Branch. Although omitted from the Beeching plan this line closed in 1972 and most of the track was lifted. However it has now been rebuilt as a heritage railway.

== Rural roads ==
Dorset is one of only five non metropolitan counties in England not to have a single motorway. However, two trunk road corridors run east–west through the county. In the north, the A303 London to Exeter and Cornwall road briefly enters the county, though for most of its route it is north of the borders with Somerset and Wiltshire. Further south, the A31, a continuation of the M27 motorway from Hampshire, serves as a northern bypass for the South East Dorset conurbation, merging into the A35 to continue west through the county, bypassing Dorchester and Bridport.

Several primary routes also run through the county. These are:

- A338, Bournemouth relief road, and through route to Salisbury.
- A35, from its split from the A31 trunk road, east through Poole, Bournemouth and Christchurch.
- A350, Poole relief road, and through route to the A303, via Blandford Forum and Shaftesbury.
- A354, from Weymouth and Portland to Salisbury, via Dorchester and Blandford Forum.
- A37, from Dorchester to Yeovil and Bristol.

Other 'A' roads are:

- A30, London to the West Country, runs east–west through the north of the county, between Shaftesbury and Sherborne, but through traffic is directed to the A303, which acts as a bypass for the towns on the A30.
- A351, Poole to Swanage, via Wareham.
- A352, Sherborne to Wareham, via Dorchester.
- A353, Weymouth, to the A352 east of Dorchester.
- A356, from the A37 west of Dorchester, to the A303 west of Yeovil, Somerset.
- A357, Blandford Forum to the A303 at Wincanton, Somerset, via Sturminster Newton and the Blackmore Vale.
- A3030, Between Sherborne, and the A357 near Sturminster Newton.
- A3066, Between Bridport, and the A30 at Crewkerne, Somerset.

== Suburban roads ==
The suburban roads of the South East Dorset conurbation (Poole, Bournemouth and Christchurch): the A341, A347, A348, A349, A3049, and A3060. These routes do not follow a straight line but do all link up forming an asymmetrical ring road around the built up area.

=== A341 road ===
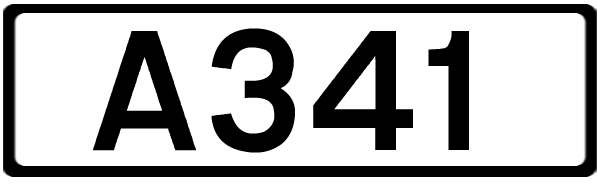
The A341 runs east-west across the north of Bournemouth and Poole.

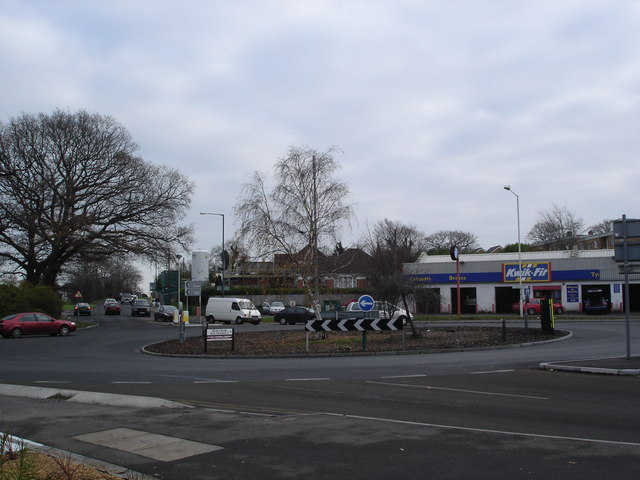
Bear Cross Roundabout is situated around half way along the A341 road.

The road begins in the north west of the Bournemouth-Poole conurbation at Merley. Queen Anne Drive at Gravel Hill travels east and becomes Magna Road. The road continues to Bear Cross, then through Kinson and terminates at the Northbourne Roundabout.

=== A347 road ===
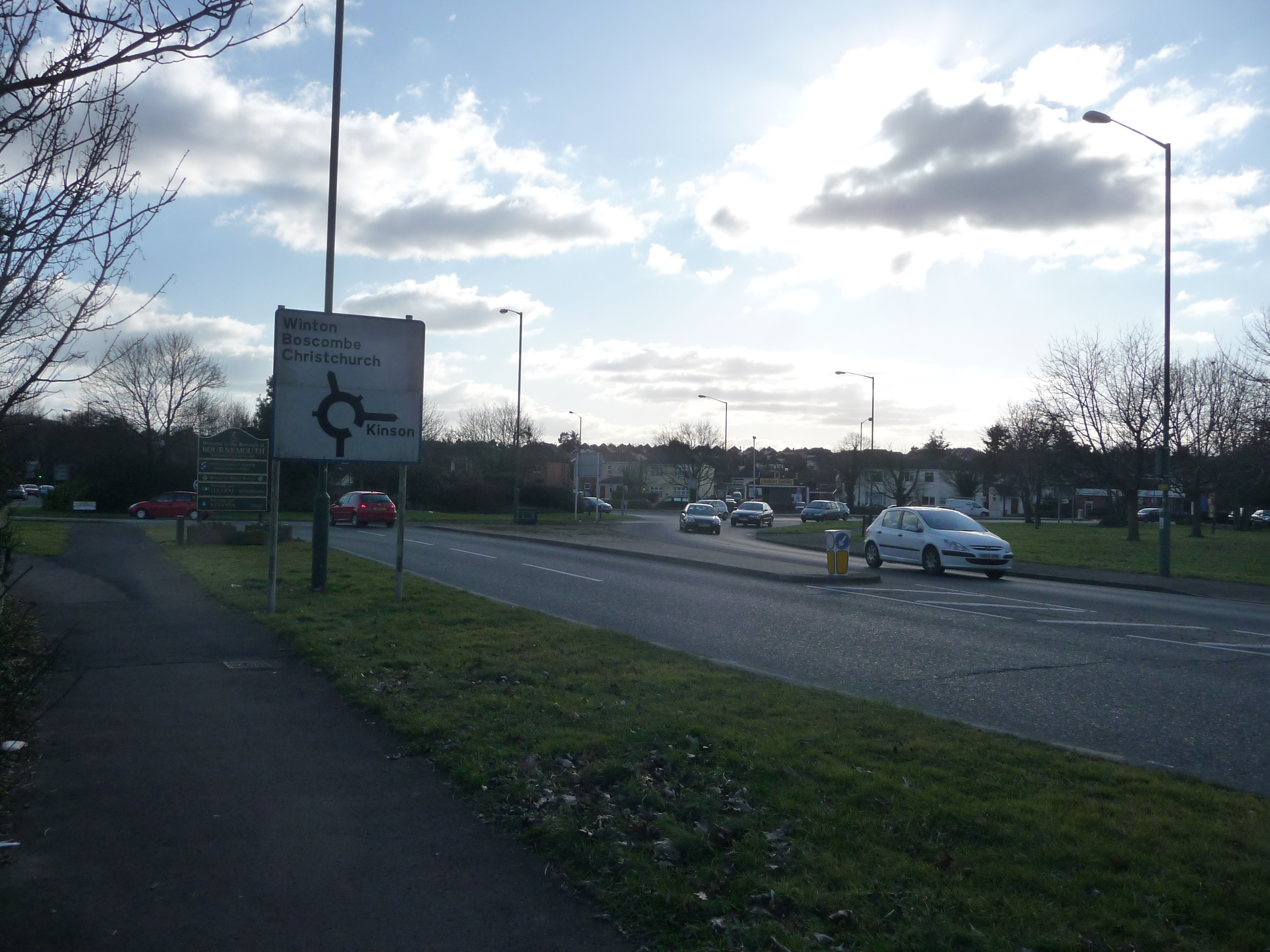
Northbourne Roundabout; at the boundary of Bournemouth (see the welcome sign on the left). The A347 road crosses this roundabout southbound. The road to the right of the roundabout is Wimborne Road, and is the eastern end of the A341 road.

The A347 road runs north-south. Its northern end is at Ferndown and from there it runs south on New Road through West Parley. At Northbourne Roundabout, the route continues onto Wimborne Road. The A347 turns into Whitelegg Way and continues around the north east boundary of Northbourne to the Redhill Roundabout where it goes south, coming off Wimborne Road onto Redhill Avenue. At the Ensbury Park junction the route crosses straight onto Boundary Road which continues to the Boundary Roundabout by Bournemouth University. The A347 road goes eastwards along Talbot Avenue, cross the Talbot Roundabout and straight to the East Avenue Roundabout where the route re-joins Wimborne Road at South Winton. Wimborne Road turns immediately south at Cemetery Junction and the A347 road follows it to Richmond Hill Roundabout where the route terminates.

=== A348 road ===
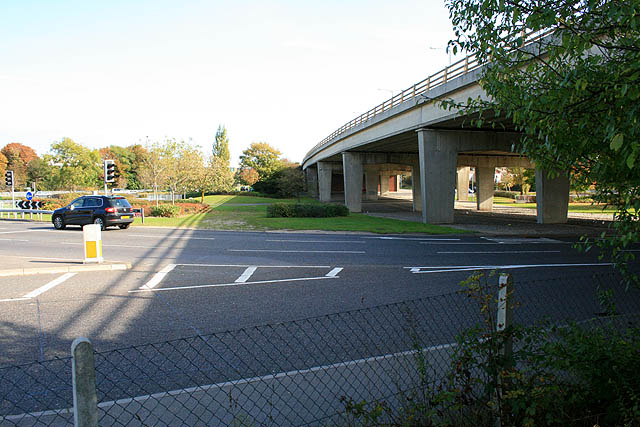
The A348 road runs over the bridge at Fleetsbridge, Poole.

The A348 road begins at Trickett's Cross, Ferndown and travels south towards along Ringwood Road towards Longham. The route crosses the Bear Cross Roundabout and continues south towards Turbary Park, crossing the West Howe Roundabout and follows Ringwood Road south over the Mountbatten Roundabout at Knighton Heath and Wallisdown Road. The A348 route becomes the A3049 road and turns off at the Alderney Roundabout onto Canford Way towards Canford Heath. At Mannings Heath Roundabout the route turns south onto Dorset Way and continues past Tower Park and across Tower Park Roundabout. The road then travels west forming the border between Canford Heath and Oakdale, crossing the Fleetsbridge gyratory and terminating at the Upton Services at Holes Bay North Roundabout.

=== A349 road ===
The A349 road begins at Oakley, travels south on Gravel Hill past Broadstone and Creekmoor, through Waterloo and terminates at Fleetsbridge.

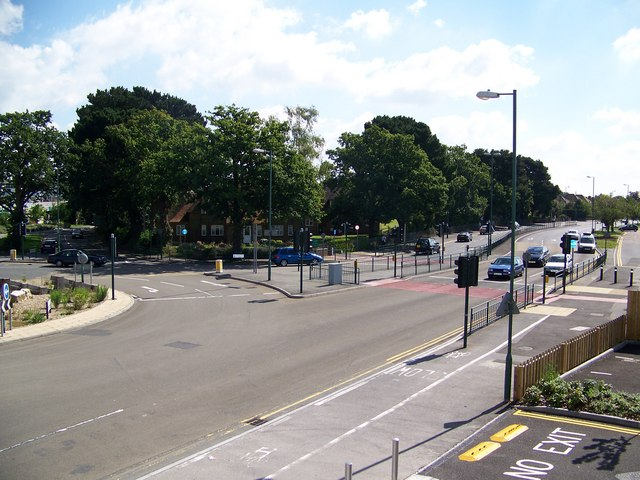
The Woodbury Roundabout entrance to the Castlepoint Shopping Centre on the A3060 road.

=== A3060 road ===
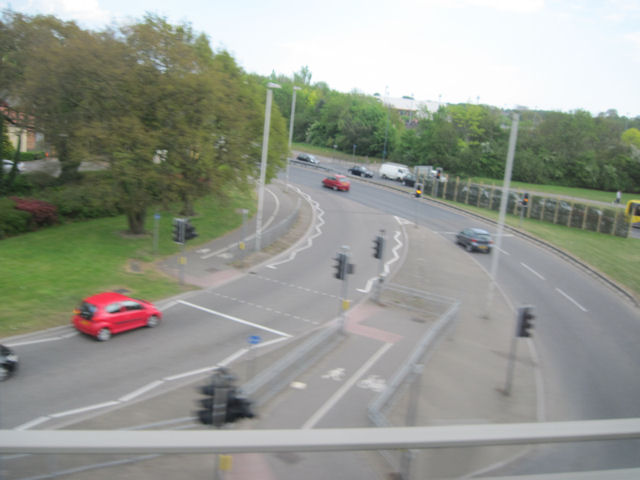
The Cooper Dean Roundabout is a large gyratory. The A3060 Road travels beneath it and the A338 Road crosses it. This picture is taken on the bridge looking east towards Christchurch.

The A3060 road begins at the Redhill Roundabout, travelling a short length of Wimborne Road. The route goes east along Castle Lane West, through the suburbs of Throop and Muscliff. The road crosses the Broadway Roundabout and Yeomans Way Roundabout entering Strouden Park past the Castlepoint Shopping Centre. The A3060 continues east past Townsend and crosses the Cooper Dean Roundabout onto Castle Lane East past the Royal Bournemouth Hospital and Littledown. After the Riverside Avenue junction on the east side of the hospital, the A3060 road ends at the Iford Roundabout, where the A35 road crosses the River Stour.

== International ==
The only passenger airport in the county is Bournemouth Airport, and there are two passenger sea ports, Weymouth Harbour and the Port of Poole.
