= Ibsley Circuit =

Coordinates: 50°52′46″N 001°46′50″W

Ibsley
- Location: Hampshire, England
- Opened: 1951
- Closed: 1955
- Major events: Formula Two
- Length: 2.1 mi (3.4 km)
- Race lap record: (Roy Salvadori, F1 Maserati 250F, 1955)

Ibsley Circuit was a car racing circuit situated at RAF Ibsley, on the Fordingbridge to Ringwood Road in Hampshire, United Kingdom.

Autosport states that the circuit was used for car racing from 1951 to 1955. All racing took place on Saturdays because its close proximity to the Church of St. Martin in Ibsley. The building was so close that the noise of the racing vehicles could disturb the congregation at worship.

== History ==
=== 1951 ===
The first meeting was held on 17 May 1951, and was according to Motor Cycling a great success. The star of the event was Bob Foster on his Velocette. He won the Junior 350cc and rode the same machine in the Senior race, just managing to make the final after a straw bale crash in his qualifying heat. However Foster lost in the final, finishing fourth.

The first car meeting at Ibsley was held on 4 August, organised by the West Hants & Dorset Car Club (WH&DCC) on a track which Autosport described as "tricky enough to have good spectator appeal". The programme consisted of sports cars races, Formula III and Formule Libre. The lap record for the day was set by Ray Merrick in his Cooper-Norton-JAP at a speed of 79.83 miles per hour (128.47 km/h). Dennis Poore won the main event of the day for racing cars over 500cc in his Alfa Romeo 8C from Oscar Moore (HWM) and Sydney Allard in an Allard.

=== 1952 ===
On 19 April 1952, the WH&DCC ran The Second Ibsley Car Race Meeting, which attracted over 100 entries and made a total of over 160 starters. The programme consisted of 11 scratch and handicap races with varying distances (from five to 15 laps); all were for sports cars or racing cars (Formula Two known at the time as Formula B) and one exclusively for Bentley. Ecurie Ecosse had come a very long way to give their Jaguar C-types an airing. The Formula Two race attracted entries from George Abecassis in an HWM and Connaughts for Kenneth McAlpine and W.B. Black. David Murray drove a Ferrari 166 and Mike Hawthorn was entered in a Bristol-engined Cooper T20. The Ibsley Grand Prix was won by Hawthorn. Later that year, a young John Surtees made his bike debut here, finishing third in his 350cc heat and fourth in the final race.

=== 1954 ===
Two years later the WH&DCC were back on 8 May to run on the shorter circuit. The main event was a Formule Libre race which attracted a remarkable entry including the V16 BRM in the hands of Ron Flockhart, who won at 83.48 miles per hour (134.35 km/h). The fastest lap was set at 87.36 miles per hour (140.59 km/h) by Jimmy Stewart and Ninian Sanderson in their Ecurie Ecosse C-types. The Formula III race was won by Les Leston from Don Parker, mounted on a Cooper and Kieft respectively.

=== 1955 ===
The final year of racing at Ibsley was 1955 and Roy Salvadori's was the main draw. Already a consistent performer throughout the country, he won both the main races in the Gilby Engineering Maserati 250F after a thrilling battle with Archie Scott-Brown in a Lister-Bristol. He also set a new lap record of one minute 21.4 seconds, (approx. 88 miles per hour (142 km/h)). This meeting also marked the appearance of the rear-engined bob-tailed Coopers with their Coventry-Climax power units, driven by Ivor Bueb and Tommy Sopwith; this car was the fore-runner of the rear engine F1 Coopers.
