= Cooper Mark III =

Formula Three racing car built in 1949

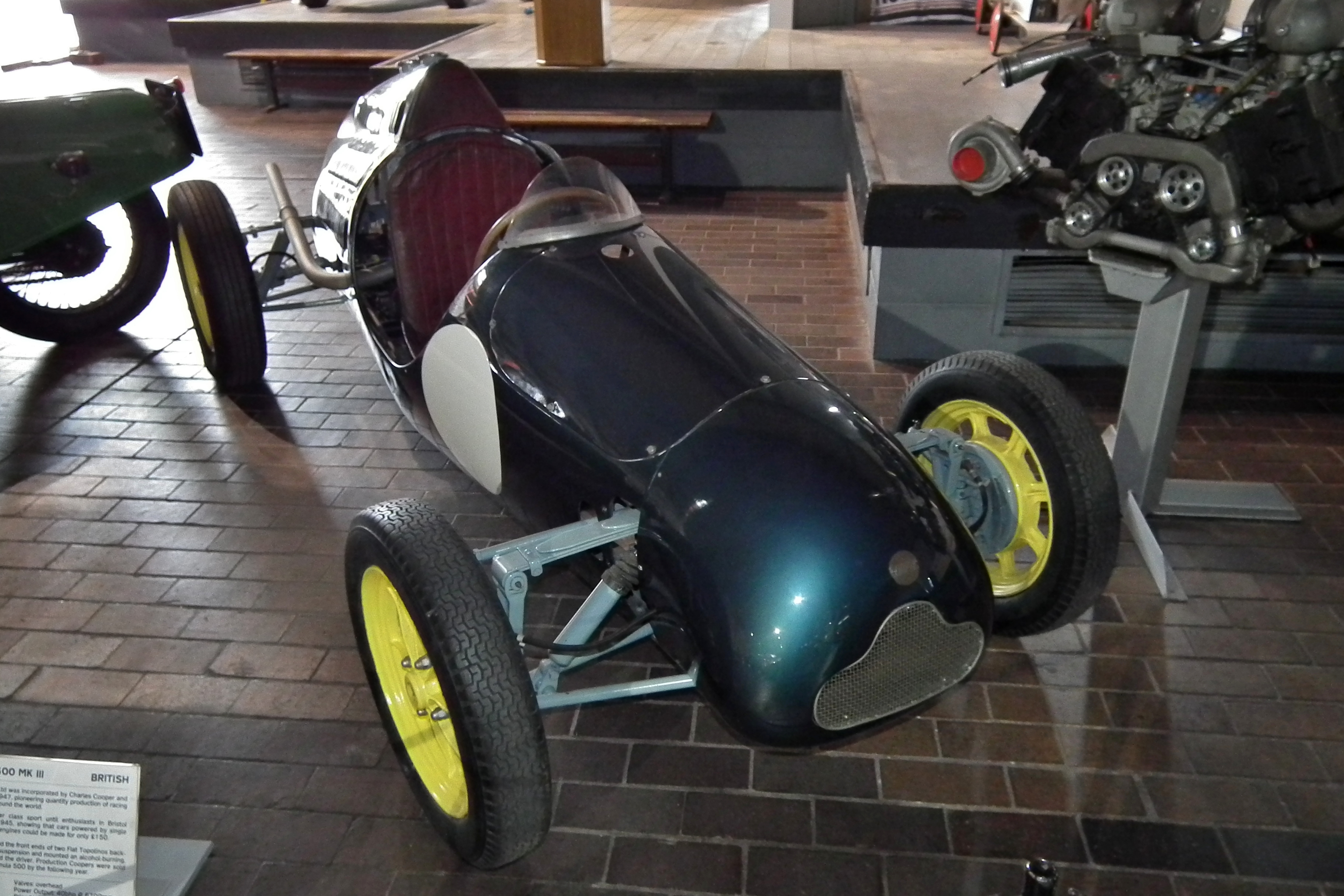
1949 Cooper 500 Mk.III

The Cooper Mark III is a Formula Three open-wheel racing car designed and developed by the Cooper Car Company in Surbiton, Surrey, England, and built in 1949. It was the successor to the Mk.II, and was offered in two versions. The first option was the T7 (Type 7); which was powered by a powered by a 40 hp (30 kW) 500 cc (31 cu in) JA Prestwich Industries (JAP) 4B Speedway single-cylinder OHV motorcycle engine. The second option was the T9 (Type 9); which featured a longer chassis, with an elongated wheelbase, and used a larger and more powerful 70 hp (52 kW) 1,000 cc (61 cu in) JA Prestwich Industries (JAP) V-twin motorcycle engine. For the first time ever, a ZF limited-slip differential was also offered as an optional extra for customers.
