= Hightown, Hampshire =

Village in Hampshire, England

Coordinates: 50.8434°N 1.7654°W

Hightown
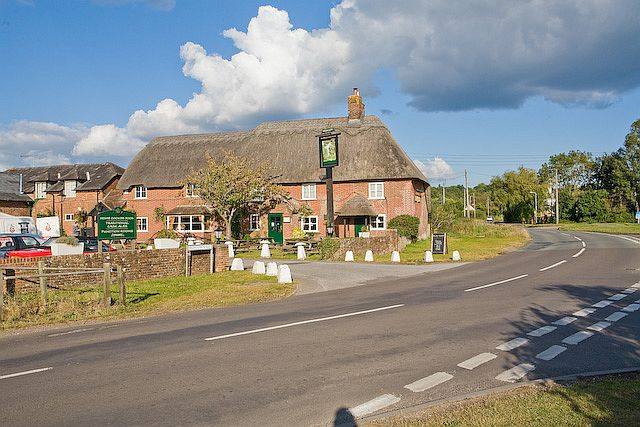
- The Elm Tree inn at Hightown

- Location within Hampshire
- Population: 2,063 (2011 Census)
- OS grid reference: SU166049
- Civil parish: Ringwood
- District: New Forest
- Shire county: Hampshire
- Region: South East
- Country: England
- Sovereign state: United Kingdom
- Post town: RINGWOOD
- Postcode district: BH24
- Dialling code: 01425
- Police: Hampshire and Isle of Wight
- Fire: Hampshire and Isle of Wight
- Ambulance: South Central
- UK Parliament: New Forest West

Hightown is a village in the New Forest district of Hampshire, England. Its nearest town is Ringwood, which lies approximately 0.8 miles (1.3 km) north-west from the village.

Hightown is located to the southeast of Ringwood where the land rises to 60 metres (200 ft). It straddles the border of the New Forest National Park. The village has one inn called The Elm Tree. The inn is the monthly meeting place of the Wessex Hang Gliding and Paragliding Club.

To the east of the village is Hightown Common. This parcel of land consisting of 16 hectares (40 acres) was acquired by the Open Spaces Society in 1929, in memory of George Shaw-Lefevre, 1st Baron Eversley who founded the society. It was passed to the National Trust, together with a memorial seat, designed by architect Elisabeth Scott.
