= Ringwood, Hampshire =

Town in Hampshire, England

Coordinates: 50.85°N 1.78°W

Ringwood
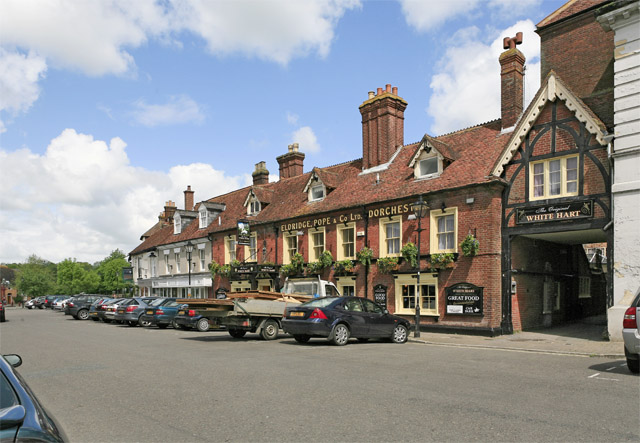
- The Original White Hart Pub, Market Place, Ringwood

- Location within Hampshire
- Population: 14,618 (2021 census)
- OS grid reference: SU1505
- Civil parish: Ringwood
- District: New Forest
- Shire county: Hampshire
- Region: South East
- Country: England
- Sovereign state: United Kingdom
- Post town: Ringwood
- Postcode district: BH24
- Dialling code: 01425
- Police: Hampshire and Isle of Wight
- Fire: Hampshire and Isle of Wight
- Ambulance: South Central
- UK Parliament: New Forest West

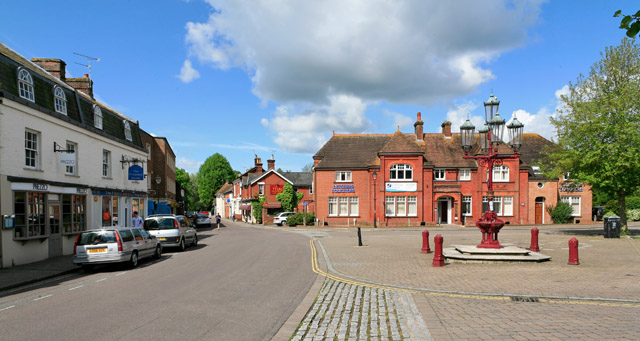
Market Place, Ringwood

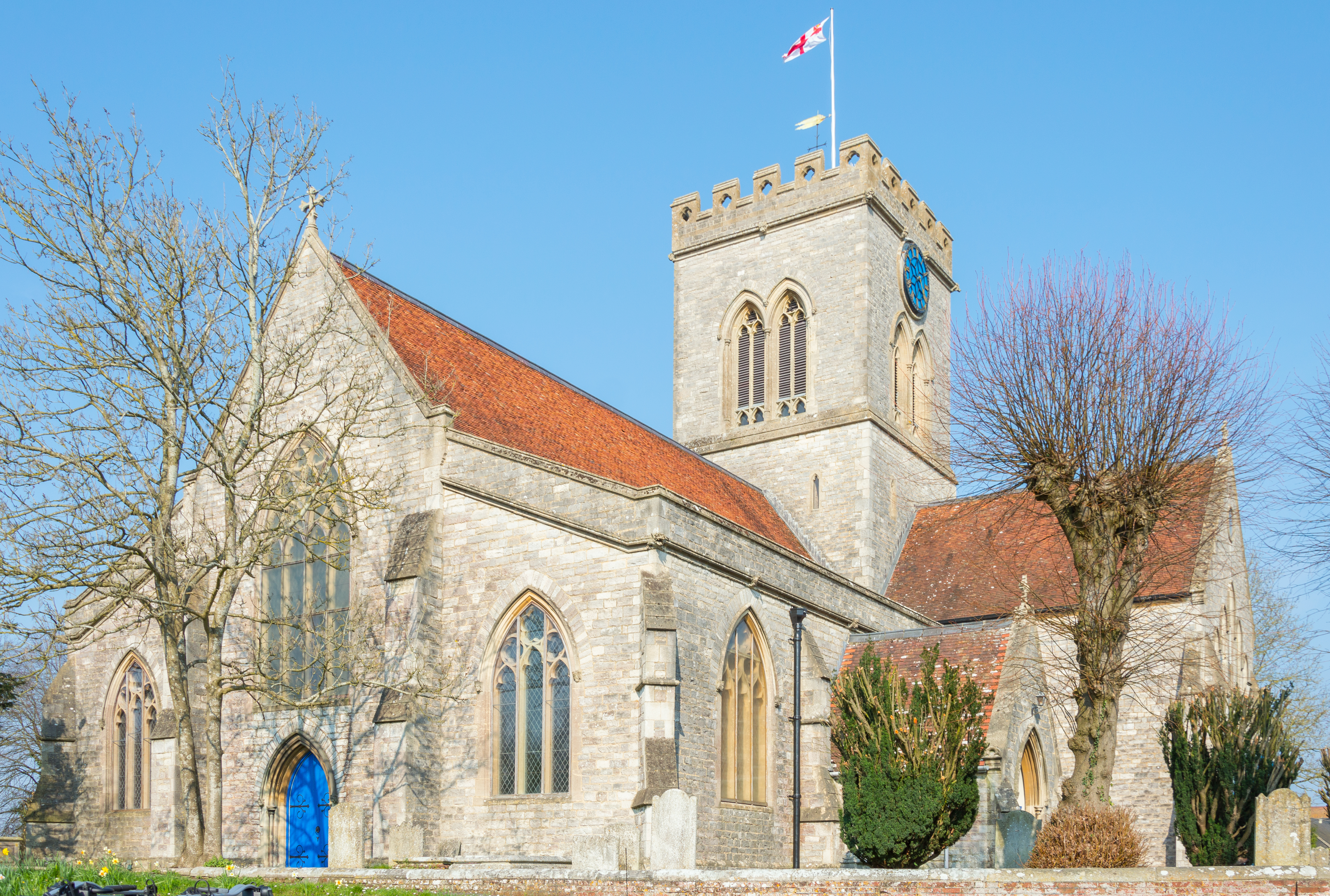
Church of St Peter and St Paul

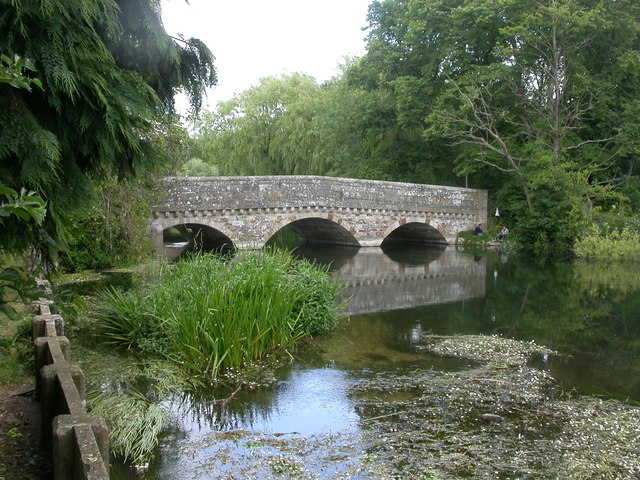
Old bridge over the River Avon

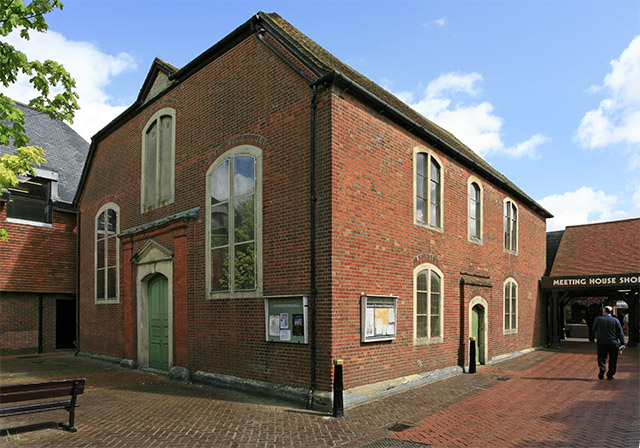
18th century Meeting House

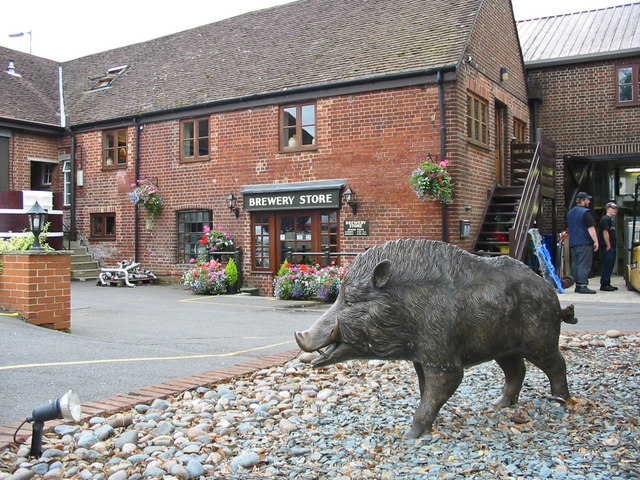
Ringwood Brewery

Ringwood is a market town and civil parish in the New Forest district, in south-west Hampshire, England, on the River Avon close to the New Forest, northeast of Bournemouth and southwest of Southampton. It was founded by the Anglo-Saxons, and has held a weekly market since the Middle Ages. In 2021 the parish had a population of 14,618, while the built-up area of the town had a population of 12,785.

== History ==
Ringwood is recorded in a charter of 961, in which King Edgar gave 22 hides of land in Rimecuda to Abingdon Abbey. The name is also recorded in the 10th century as Runcwuda and Rimucwuda. The second element wuda means a 'wood'; rimuc may be derived from rima meaning 'border' or 'rim', hence 'border wood'. The name may refer to Ringwood's position on the fringe of Ringwood Forest, or on the border of Hampshire. William Camden in 1607 gave a much more fanciful derivation, claiming that the original name was Regne-wood, the Regni being an ancient people of Britain.

In the Domesday Book of 1086, Ringwood (Rincvede) had been appropriated by the Crown and all but six hides taken into the New Forest. Prior to 1066 Ringwood had been held by Earl Tostig. During the 12th and early 13th centuries Ringwood, like other manors of which John and Henry III had the immediate overlordship, frequently changed hands. Thus it was held by Roland de Dinan, a Breton lord, in 1167; Robert de Beaumont, 4th Earl of Leicester before 1204; Theodoric the Teuton, a servant of King John, after 1204; William Marshal, 2nd Earl of Pembroke, in 1217, and intermittently by Richard Marshal, 3rd Earl of Pembroke and Gilbert Marshal, 4th Earl of Pembroke up to 1237; Simon de Steyland, the King's clerk, around 1237; John son of Geoffrey, described as "of the lands of the Bretons", from 1240; Nicholas of Ely, Bishop of Winchester, from about 1272; and then by three successive queens: Queen Eleanor, Queen Margaret, and Queen Isabella, from 1280 until 1331.

In January 1331, Ringwood and other manors which Isabella had previously surrendered were granted to William Montagu, 1st Earl of Salisbury, whose descendants with some intermission held it for more than two centuries, until the death of Margaret Pole, Countess of Salisbury in 1541. It was held by Edward Seymour, 1st Duke of Somerset until his execution in 1552, and then briefly by John Gates who was executed in 1553. Queen Mary granted the lands to Francis Hastings, 2nd Earl of Huntingdon, but by the middle of the 17th century the manor had passed to the Arundells of Wardour, and in 1728 was in the hands of Henry Arundell, 6th Baron Arundell of Wardour. His grandson, the eighth Baron, sold it in 1794 to John Morant of Brockenhurst, and the Morant family held the manor throughout the 19th century.

In 1108, it was recorded that the tenants of the "manor of Ringwood and Harbridge" had common rights in the New Forest, among the knights and esquires, for their farm beasts and plough beasts between "Teg att Brokelisford" and "Ostaven" and in the vill of Beaulieu for all their livestock except goats and geese: for this they paid Henry I an annual agistment. A valuation of the manor made at the end of the 13th century records the tenants services included mowing the lord's meadow, haymaking on eight acres in "Muchelmershe," carting the hay and making a rick; they were to repair the mills and the houses within the court.

A watermill in Ringwood is mentioned in the Domesday Book and later there were two. In March 1226 Henry III granted a weekly market in Ringwood on Wednesdays to Richard Marshal, 3rd Earl of Pembroke and Gervaise his wife to hold until the King should come of age. In 1337 the Earl of Salisbury, as lord of Ringwood Manor, was granted a yearly fair on the feast-day of Saint Andrew (30 November). There was also another fair held on the feast of Saint Peter (29 June) in the 16th century.

After the Battle of Sedgemoor on 6 July 1685, James Scott, 1st Duke of Monmouth was arrested near Horton, Dorset. Monmouth is believed to have hidden in a ditch under an ash tree disguised as a shepherd, but was betrayed by a local woman who, according to legend, later killed herself in remorse. Monmouth was then taken to the house now named Monmouth House in West Street (between the Market Place and the Fish Inn). It was there that he wrote a letter to James II begging forgiveness. This was not granted, and he was brought to trial in the Tower of London by the infamous "Hanging Judge Jefferies".

Also after the Battle of Sedgemoor, an elderly local lady, Alice Lisle, gave refuge to two wanted men who were escaping the battle. When her home, Moyles Court (now Moyles Court School), was raided, the men were found and Alice was arrested. She was sentenced by the same Judge Jefferies to be burned at the stake; she received a late reprieve, and the sentence was reduced to beheading. She is buried at St Mary's Church, Ellingham, one mile from Moyles Court. Her tomb can be found to the right of the church entrance; it is easily spotted as the lid has been left unfinished with rough edges. There is now a pub called the Alice Lisle near Moyles Court.

The town hall was erected by John Morant in 1868 to designs by Thomas Henry Wyatt. The town was famous in the 19th century for its "Ringwood" woollen gloves, and there was also a large linen collar and cuff factory here.

The site of Royal Air Force Station Ibsley, in use during World War II, is located on the outskirts of the Ringwood hamlet of Poulner. This site has later been used for motor-racing as Ibsley Circuit and today is a quarry lake area.

== Geography ==
Ringwood is a town on the east bank of the River Avon in Hampshire. The parish includes the hamlets of Poulner, Hangersley, Hightown, Crow, Kingston, and Bisterne.

== Economy ==
Ringwood has a weekly market in the traditional market place. A cattle market ran until 29 June 1988 in the Furlong, which is now home to a Waitrose supermarket, coffee shops and fashion outlets. Ringwood was noted as the second most expensive market town in England in July 2008 with average property prices of over £380,000.

Ringwood was the home of the Ringwood Brewery, which produced a variety of cask ales and ran five pubs in the local area, such as the Inn on the Furlong in Ringwood. Ringwood Brewery also produced a variety of wines. It was closed in December 2023, but remains a brand name of Carlsberg Marston's Brewing Company (CMBC).

== Politics ==
Ringwood is within the New Forest West parliamentary constituency. The current member of Parliament (MP) is Sir Desmond Swayne who represents the Conservative Party. Ringwood is represented by one councillor on Hampshire County Council and six councillors on New Forest District Council (although four of these are shared with neighbouring areas). Currently Ringwood's county councillor is Conservative, and the district councillors feature three Conservative, one Labour, one Green and one independent.

Ringwood Town Council was formed in 1974. The parish is divided into three wards. Since 2000, the leader of Ringwood Town Council has been known as the mayor. Until this point, despite a failed previous attempt to introduce a mayor in 1987, the leader was known as the chairman. The councillors elect a mayor every two years who is also the chairman of the council. The current mayor of Ringwood is Rae Frederick. The council, which is elected every four years, has 14 councillors: six Independent, four Labour, three Conservative and one Liberal Democrat. Ringwood Town Council provide a variety of services and amenities for the town, including allotments, the cemetery, recreation grounds some public open spaces, the running of events, and a youth service. The council is based in the Ringwood Gateway building on The Furlong in the town centre.

Ringwood was the birthplace of British communist leader and anti-fascist Bill Alexander, who was present at the Battle of Cable Street and commanded the British Battalion near the end of the Spanish Civil War.

== Demographics ==
At the 2021 census, Ringwood civil parish had a population of 14,618 people in 6,296 households. The Office for National Statistics also define a contiguous Ringwood 'built-up area', which excludes rural parts of the parish and outlying hamlets, but includes parts of Blashford; this had a population of 12,785 in 2021.

Census population of Ringwood parish
Census	Population	Female	Male	Households	Source
2001	13,602	7,117	6,485	5,739	
2011	14,181	7,394	6,787	6,034	
2021	14,618	7,590	7,028	6,296	

== Education ==
The state infant schools are Ringwood Church of England Infant School and Poulner Infant School. The state junior schools Ringwood Junior School and Poulner Junior School.

The state secondary school and sixth form is Ringwood School, a national teaching academy.

There are two private schools, these are Moyles Court School and Ringwood Waldorf School.

== Sport and leisure ==
Ringwood has a Non-League football club, Ringwood Town F.C., which plays at Long Lane.

The town is home to Ellingham and Ringwood Rugby Football Club, which was formed in 1966. The Men's 1st XV team currently play in the Counties 1 Hampshire division. The Women's 1st XV team currently play in the Women’s National Challenge (NC) 1 South West (West) division and have previously included several internationally capped players in their squad including twins Poppy and Bryony Cleall (England), Lisa Cockburn (Scotland), Phoebe Murray (England), Donna Rose (Wales), and Alicia Maude (GB 7's).

== Culture ==
Since 1987, Ringwood has hosted the British Pedal Car Grand Prix (originally the 'Voitures a Pedales' race until 1989).

== Transport ==
The main road through Ringwood is the A31, which runs west to Dorchester and east to Southampton via the New Forest. A bypass of the town was completed in two stages; the first to the west in the 1940s and the second to the east in 1975. The other significant road is the A338, which goes north to Salisbury and south to Bournemouth.

Ringwood railway station opened in 1847. It lay on the Southampton and Dorchester Railway. In 1862 the Ringwood, Christchurch and Bournemouth Railway created a new link with Christchurch. The line to Christchurch was closed in 1935, and the station ceased operating when the Southampton and Dorchester Railway line was closed in 1964. A report (Connecting Communities: Expanding Access to the Rail Network) from the Association of Train Operating Companies in 2009 recommended rebuilding part of the line from Brockenhurst to Ringwood.

Several bus stands are located at Meeting House Lane next to The Furlong Car Park. National Express Coaches provide frequent services to and from London's Victoria Coach Station, Heathrow Airport and Gatwick Airport. Morebus route X3 between Salisbury and Bournemouth calls at Ringwood twice an hour. There are also less-frequent services to Brockenhurst and Poulner.

== Media ==
Local news and television programmes are provided by BBC South and ITV Meridian. Television signals are received from Rowridge transmitting station and the local relay transmitter situated in the Poulner area of the town.

Local radio stations are BBC Radio Solent, Heart South, Capital South, Easy Radio South Coast, Nation Radio South Coast, and Forest FM, a community based station.

The town has a dedicated free newspaper, The Ringwood and Fordingbridge News. The town is also covered by three local newspapers, Lymington Times and New Milton Advertiser, The Forest Journal and Southern Daily Echo.

== Filming Location ==
The swimming pool, sports hall and exterior scenes of the BBC television comedy series The Brittas Empire were filmed at Ringwood Health and Leisure Centre, at the time known as Ringwood Recreation Centre. Mr and Mrs Brittas' house was filmed at 47 Northfield Road, and Laura Lancing's house was filmed at 2 (The Knole) Highfield Road. Various other buildings in the town featured including 1 High Street which appeared as Le Jollie Chocolatier, Church Hatch in the Market Place appeared as 'Archdeacon's Residence, Romsey' in Series 5, and the flash forward in Series 5 when Gavin is campaigning for election was filmed in the cul de sac area outside 28-38 Kingsfield.

An episode during series 8 of the BBC television show Top Gear included filming in the town, with a notable incident being James May crashing a caravan whilst exiting the Ringwood Services on the A31 adjacent to the Fish Inn.

== Church of St Peter and St Paul ==
A church in Ringwood is mentioned in the Domesday Book of 1086. It was rebuilt in the 13th century and survived until 1853, when it was completely knocked down and rebuilt. The church contains a 15th-century monumental brass of John Prophete, Dean of Hereford and York.

== Twin towns ==
Ringwood has been twinned with Pont-Audemer in Normandy, France, since 1986.

Ringwood also has three 'sister' towns, Ringwood, New Jersey, in the United States; Ringwood, Victoria, in Australia; and Ringwood, Ontario, in Canada.

The mayor of the borough of Ringwood, New Jersey, approached Ringwood Town Council in September 1976, advising that the borough had, in recognition of the 750th anniversary of Ringwood, Hampshire's market charter, resolved that the Hampshire town would become their Sister City. A laminated copy of the resolution was sent and several visits were subsequently exchanged on an official basis.

Ringwood, Victoria, approached Ringwood Town Council in 1977 and subsequently became the town's second sister town. Visits were later exchanged and correspondence ensued.

Ringwood, Ontario, was contacted in late 1978.
