= Gorley =

Gorley may refer to:

== Places in Hampshire, England ==
- North Gorley, a hamlet in the New Forest National Park
- South Gorley, a hamlet in the New Forest National Park
- Gorley Hill, the site of a former Iron Age promontory hillfort
- Gorley Lynch, a hamlet in the civil parish of Gorley in the New Forest National Park

== People with the surname ==
- Ashley Gorley (born 1977), American songwriter, publisher, and producer from Danville, Kentucky
- Les Gorley (1950–2019), English former professional rugby league footballer
- Peter Gorley (born 1951), English former professional rugby league footballer
- Roger Gorley, forcibly removed from his hospitalized same-sex partner at the Research Medical Center, Kansas City, Missouri
- Gorley Putt (1913–1995), British academic, author and Liberal Party candidate

== See also ==
- Gorle (disambiguation)
- Gormley, a surname
- Gorsley, a village in Gloucestershire, England
- Gourley (disambiguation)
