= Tipping (surname) =

Tipping is a surname. Notable people with the surname include:

- Andrew Tipping (born 1942), retired Supreme Court of New Zealand judge
- Bartholomew Tipping IV (1648–1718), High Sheriff of Berkshire
- Bartholomew Tipping VII (1735–1798), High Sheriff of Berkshire
- Dennis Tipping (1939–2025), Australian sprinter
- E. W. "Bill" Tipping (1915–1970), Australian journalist, social commentator and activist
- Fred Tipping, Canadian 20th century trade organizer
- Henry Avray Tipping (1855–1933), British writer and garden designer
- Justin Tipping, American film and television director
- Lindsay Tipping (1950–1994), Australian rules footballer
- Marjorie Tipping (1917–2009), Australian historian
- Norm Tipping (1913–2002), Australian rugby league player and coach
- Richard Tipping (born 1949), poet and artist
- Sir Thomas Tipping (knight) (1614–1693), English commissioner
- Sir Thomas Tipping, 1st Baronet (1653–1718), English Member of Parliament, son of the above
- Sir Thomas Tipping, 2nd Baronet (1700–1725) – see Tipping baronets
- Tip Tipping (1958–1993), English stuntman and actor
- William 'Eternity' Tipping (1599–1649), English religious writer
- William Tipping (1816–1897), English railway magnate and Member of Parliament
