= Ibsley =

Village and parish in Hampshire, England

Coordinates: 50.8835°N 01.7896°W

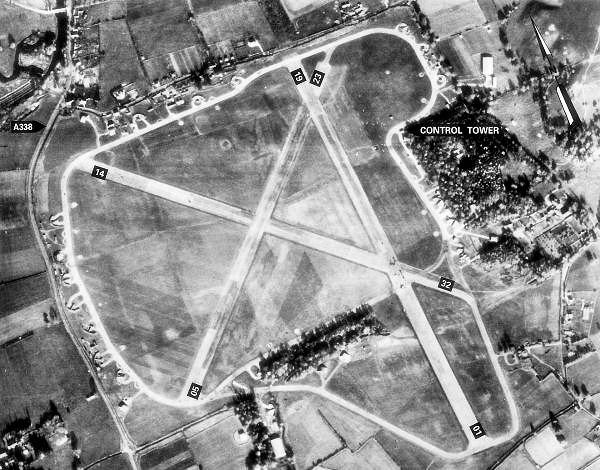
- RAF Ibsley, 1944.

- Location within Hampshire
- OS grid reference: SU1509
- Civil parish: Ellingham, Harbridge and Ibsley
- District: New Forest
- Shire county: Hampshire
- Region: South East
- Country: England
- Sovereign state: United Kingdom
- Post town: RINGWOOD
- Postcode district: BH24
- Dialling code: 01425
- Police: Hampshire and Isle of Wight
- Fire: Hampshire and Isle of Wight
- Ambulance: South Central
- UK Parliament: New Forest West

Ibsley is a village and former civil parish, now in the parish of Ellingham, Harbridge and Ibsley, in the New Forest district, in Hampshire, England. It is about 2.5 miles (4 km) north of the town of Ringwood. In 1931 the parish had a population of 228.

== Overview ==
The village of Ibsley lies to the east of the River Avon on the main road between Ringwood and Fordingbridge, and has some picturesque thatched cottages. To the southeast is a series of lakes known collectively as Blashford Lakes, which have been created as the result of sand and gravel extraction since the 1950s.

On 1 April 1932 the parish was abolished and merged with Harbridge to form "Harbridge and Ibsley". The hamlets of South Gorley, Furze Hill, and Mockbeggar were all part of Ibsley parish.

== History ==
Ibsley is listed in the Domesday Book of 1086 when it was held by a certain Ralph from Hugh de Port. The name of the settlement at that time was Tibeslei and it means "Tibb(i)'s wood/clearing". In the 14th century Ibsley was split into two moieties divided between John atte Bere and William de Melbury.

That part which John atte Bere had owned was by the end of the 14th century in the possession of William Stourton. His son John, who later became the 1st Baron Stourton, inherited the estate in 1414. It then descended with the Baron Stourtons, until William Stourton, 7th Baron Stourton sold the manor in 1544 to Robert White, from whom it descended with Rockford in Ellingham to the Beconshaws and Lisles. In the 19th century it was sold to the second Earl of Normanton, and became annexed to the Somerley estate.

That part which William de Melbury had owned had by the 16th century passed to the Berkley family. John Berkeley sold the manor to William Batten in 1556. It was sold to Jeremiah Cray in 1697. It stayed with the Cray family in the 18th century, but by the 19th century it was joined to the other manor, and also became part of the Somerley estate.

The church of Saint Martin was rebuilt in 1832, replacing an earlier 17th-century church. It is of brick with some stone dressings. It is now deconsecrated and was in use as an art gallery as of 2008.

A bridge across the river avon was built in the first part of the 19th century. It was almost completely rebuilt in 1930. It is largely made from Purbeck stone and crosses the river with three arches.

== RAF Ibsley ==
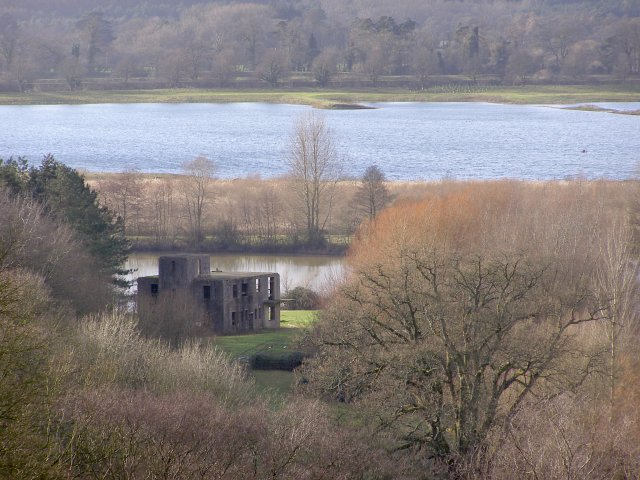
Derelict control tower overlooking the lakes near Ibsley

RAF Ibsley was a World War II airfield near Ibsley. It was opened in 1941, and it was used by both the Royal Air Force and United States Army Air Forces. During the war it was used primarily as a fighter airfield. After the war it was closed in 1947.

The airfield appeared in the wartime propaganda film The First of the Few as the main wartime base in the production.

Most of the airfield has since been quarried away by gravel extraction, and much of the site is covered by the Blashford Lakes nature reserve. One lake is overlooked by the derelict, windowless control tower with other remnants scattered around the nearby countryside.
