= Furze Hill =

Hamlet in Hampshire, England

Coordinates: 50.9003°N 1.7572°W

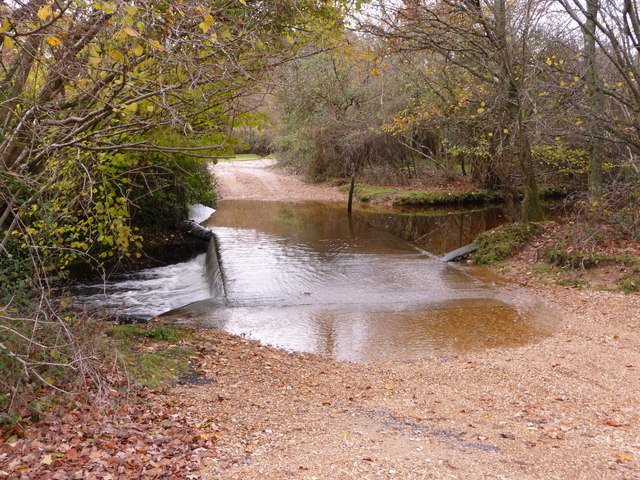
- Ford at Furze Hill

- Location within Hampshire
- OS grid reference: SU172111
- Civil parish: Hyde
- District: New Forest
- Shire county: Hampshire
- Region: South East
- Country: England
- Sovereign state: United Kingdom
- Post town: FORDINGBRIDGE
- Postcode district: SP6
- Dialling code: 01425
- Police: Hampshire and Isle of Wight
- Fire: Hampshire and Isle of Wight
- Ambulance: South Central
- UK Parliament: New Forest West

Furze Hill (or Furzehill) is a hamlet situated in the New Forest National Park of Hampshire, England. It is in the civil parish of Ellingham, Harbridge and Ibsley. Its nearest town is Fordingbridge, which lies approximately 3.1 miles (5.2 km) north-west from the hamlet.

Furze Hill is a hamlet in the civil parish of Hyde. It is situated on low ground on either side of Huckles Brook on the South Gorley to Ogdens road. The houses are surrounded by fields and paddocks. Additional houses can be found at the southern edge of Gorley Common lining a narrow track to North Gorley.

Furze Hill is the most recent settlement in the parish of Hyde, becoming an established community only in the 20th century.
