= Thomas Tipping =

Thomas Tipping may refer to:

- Thomas Tipping (knight) (1614–1693), Parliamentarian during the English Civil War
- Sir Thomas Tipping, 1st Baronet (1653–1718), English baronet and Member of Parliament
- Thomas Tipping (died 1776), MP for County Louth (Parliament of Ireland constituency)
