= Turmer =

Hamlet in Hampshire, England

Coordinates: 50.886°N 1.804°W

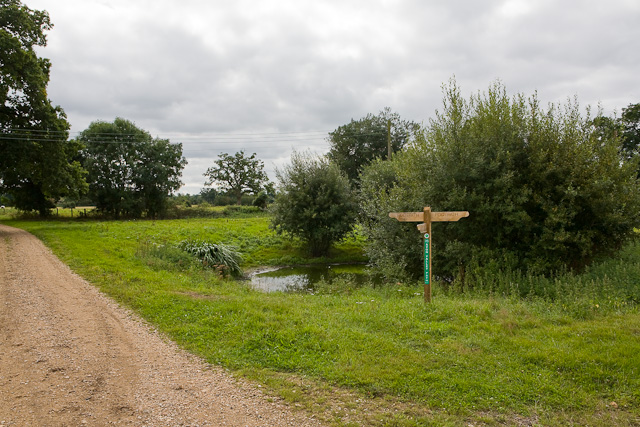
- Turmer Pond

- Location within Hampshire
- OS grid reference: SU139097
- Civil parish: Ellingham, Harbridge and Ibsley
- District: New Forest
- Shire county: Hampshire
- Region: South East
- Country: England
- Sovereign state: United Kingdom
- Post town: RINGWOOD
- Postcode district: BH24
- Dialling code: 01425
- Police: Hampshire and Isle of Wight
- Fire: Hampshire and Isle of Wight
- Ambulance: South Central
- UK Parliament: New Forest West

Turmer is a small hamlet near Harbridge in Hampshire, England. It lies within the civil parish of Ellingham, Harbridge and Ibsley.

Turmer is unusual for a settlement in England. No paved roads reach the hamlet and traditional farming techniques, including heavy horses, are still used there. The council describes it as "a village almost lost in time".

The hamlet is part of a conservation area and includes an 18th-century farm, a 19th-century school built by the Earl of Normanton and thatched cottages, all grouped around a pond.

The Avon Valley Path passes through the hamlet.
