= Rockford, Hampshire =

Hamlet in Hampshire, England

Coordinates: 50.8714°N 1.7737°W

Rockford
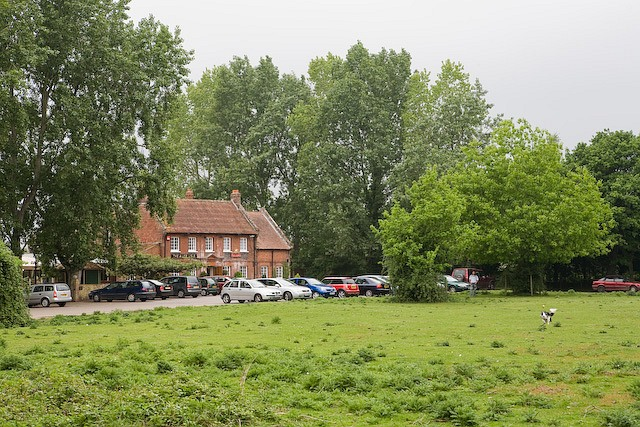
- Rockford Green and the Alice Lisle inn

- Location within Hampshire
- OS grid reference: SU160080
- Civil parish: Ellingham, Harbridge and Ibsley
- District: New Forest
- Shire county: Hampshire
- Region: South East
- Country: England
- Sovereign state: United Kingdom
- Post town: RINGWOOD
- Postcode district: BH24 3N
- Dialling code: 01425
- Police: Hampshire and Isle of Wight
- Fire: Hampshire and Isle of Wight
- Ambulance: South Central
- UK Parliament: New Forest West

Rockford is a hamlet in the civil parish of Ellingham, Harbridge and Ibsley, in the New Forest district of Hampshire, England, on the western edge of the New Forest National Park. Its nearest town is Ringwood, which lies approximately 1.8 miles (2.9 km) south from the hamlet.

== Overview ==
Rockford is a hamlet close to the village of Ellingham. It is separated from Ellingham by a series of lakes known collectively as Blashford Lakes, which have been created as the result of sand and gravel extraction since the 1950s. The hamlet has one pub known as The Alice Lisle.

Close to Moyles Court, next to the lane leading to Linwood, stands the Moyles Court Oak, one of the largest trees in the New Forest, and which could be older than the famous Knightwood Oak. The lanes about the hamlet harbour the suckering remnants of Goodyer's Elm, a rare and unusual tree discovered by John Goodyer in 1624, but decimated by Dutch elm disease in the late 20th century.

=== Moyles Court School ===
Moyles Court School is an independent day and boarding school for pupils from 3 – 16 years old. Moyles Court was the former manor house of Rockford, and later for Ellingham as well. The 17th century manor house was once the home of Dame Alice Lisle, the last lady to be publicly beheaded in England following a judicial trial. In 1940 the building was requisitioned by the RAF, who stationed the headquarters for the Ibsley Airfield there for six years.

== History ==
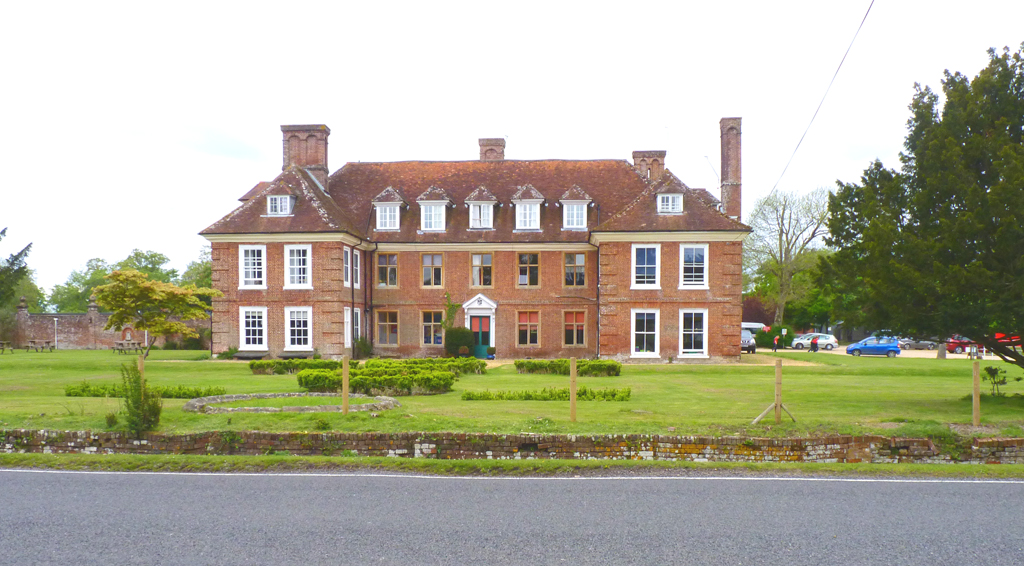
Moyles Court School

Rockford is listed in the Domesday Book of 1086 when it was held by Hugh of St Quentin. Rockford had passed to the Moels family by the 13th century and it stayed in that family until the death of John de Moels in 1337. The manor passed to his daughter Isabel, wife of William Botreaux. The manor stayed in the Botreaux family until the late 15th century when it was sold to Robert White. The White family then held it until William White died in 1594, leaving an only daughter, Alice wife of William Beconshaw.

After this time Rockford passed like Ellingham to the Lisle family, Moyles Court in Rockford becoming their chief residence. Alice Lisle, widow of John Lisle the regicide, continued to live at Moyles Court after her husband's assassination in 1664, until her own notorious trial and death by beheading in the market-place at Winchester in 1685 after the failure of the Monmouth Rebellion. Rockford was eventually restored, like Ellingham, to her son John. In the middle of the 19th century Edward Hayles Taylor sold Rockford to Henry Baring of Somerley, from whom it was purchased by John Coventry of Burgate Manor. Moyles Court, however, was sold to the Earl of Normanton with Ellingham.

A chapel at Rockford, subject to the church of Ellingham, was granted by Walter of St Quentin, with the tithe from his house, to the abbey of Saint-Sauveur-le-Vicomte about 1170, and mass was to be said there three times a week by the chaplain of Ellingham or a monk. No trace of it remains, but it probably stood in the "Chapell field" mentioned in an indenture of 1664. A watermill belonged to Rockford Manor in the 13th century, but by 1337 was in bad repair, and in 1349 it was almost in decay. It is mentioned in 1664, but no trace of it exists at the present day. The right of free fishing was attached to the manor in the 18th century.

Moyles Court is now Moyles Court School. The 18th-Century building which has become "The Alice Lisle Inn" was formerly the village school for Rockford.
