= Frogham, Hampshire =

Village in Hampshire, England

Coordinates: 50.9151°N 1.7557°W

Frogham
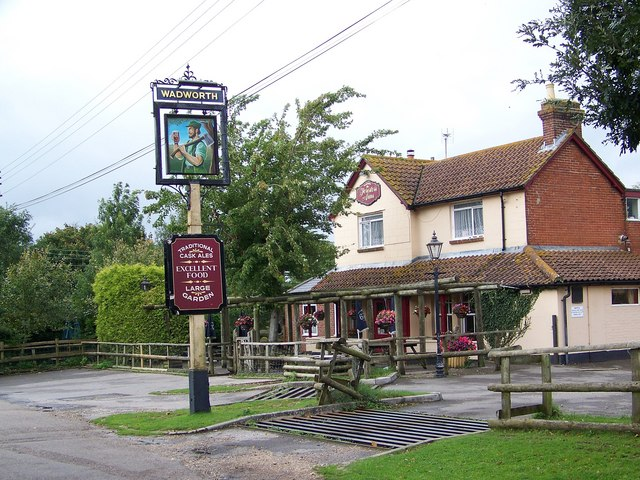
- The Forester's Arms, Frogham

- Location within Hampshire
- OS grid reference: SU173128
- Civil parish: Hyde
- District: New Forest
- Shire county: Hampshire
- Region: South East
- Country: England
- Sovereign state: United Kingdom
- Post town: FORDINGBRIDGE
- Postcode district: SP6
- Dialling code: 01425
- Police: Hampshire and Isle of Wight
- Fire: Hampshire and Isle of Wight
- Ambulance: South Central
- UK Parliament: New Forest West

Frogham is a small village in the New Forest National Park of Hampshire, England. It is in the civil parish of Hyde. Its nearest town is Fordingbridge, which lies approximately 1.8 miles (2.5 km) north-west from the village.

== The village ==
Frogham is a small village in the civil parish of Hyde. It is the second-largest settlement in the parish after Hyde itself. Frogham is situated on a plateau overlooking the heathland of the New Forest to the east. The village is situated around a crossroads leading to the nearby settlements of Hyde, Blissford, and Stuckton.

Frogham has a small Congregational church, and a pub, known as The Foresters Arms. Hyde memorial hall is also located in Frogham.

Frogham also has an ancient roadside well called "Abbots Well" providing refreshment for both animals and humans.

== History ==
The earliest records which mention Frogham date from the beginning of the 14th century. There are many legends which identify the Frogham area as being a centre for smuggling in the 18th century. The chapel in Frogham was originally a non-conformist school for 70 pupils; it was also registered for worship, and the current building dates from 1910. Many of the houses in the village were built in the 1950s and 1960s.

== Frogham Fair ==
Frogham is the location of the annual Frogham Fair – a traditional village fête which takes place on the afternoon of the last Saturday of in July in the fields near Frogham crossroads, next to The Forester's Arms. Established over 50 years ago and organised by local volunteers, the fair raises money for the Memorial Hall and a number of local charities. A highlight of the fair is the wheelbarrow race up the exceptionally steep Blissford Hill. There are also terrier races, children's games, art and craft stalls, a bar, food, classic cars and live music.
