= Hungerford, Hampshire =

Hamlet in Hampshire, England

Coordinates: 50.9089°N 1.7636°W

Hungerford
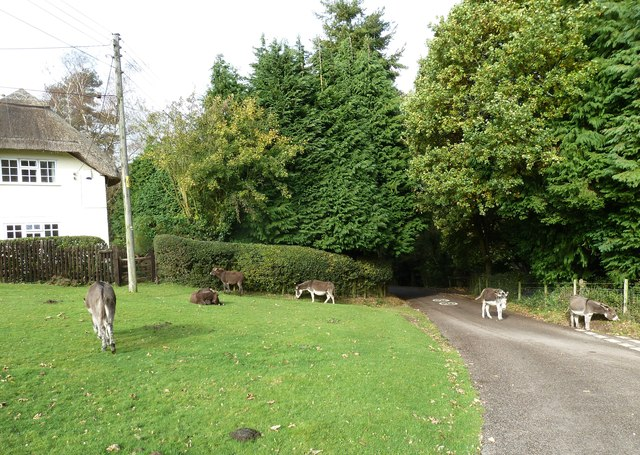
- Donkeys on the green at Hungerford

- Location within Hampshire
- OS grid reference: SU167121
- Civil parish: Hyde
- District: New Forest
- Shire county: Hampshire
- Region: South East
- Country: England
- Sovereign state: United Kingdom
- Post town: FORDINGBRIDGE
- Postcode district: SP62
- Dialling code: 01425
- Police: Hampshire and Isle of Wight
- Fire: Hampshire and Isle of Wight
- Ambulance: South Central
- UK Parliament: New Forest West

Hungerford is a hamlet in the New Forest National Park of Hampshire, England. Its nearest town is Fordingbridge, which lies approximately 2 miles (3.4 km) north-west of the village.

Hungerford is a hamlet in the civil parish of Hyde, and it is located just to the south of the village of Hyde. With just 11 dwellings, Hungerford is the smallest hamlet in the parish. Hungerford is notable for its triangular village green bordered by two white thatched cottages, a cob farmhouse, and a traditional cottage. A country house built in 1927 is situated on the southern edge of the hamlet.
