= Blissford =

Village in Hampshire, England

Coordinates: 50.9210°N 1.7531°W

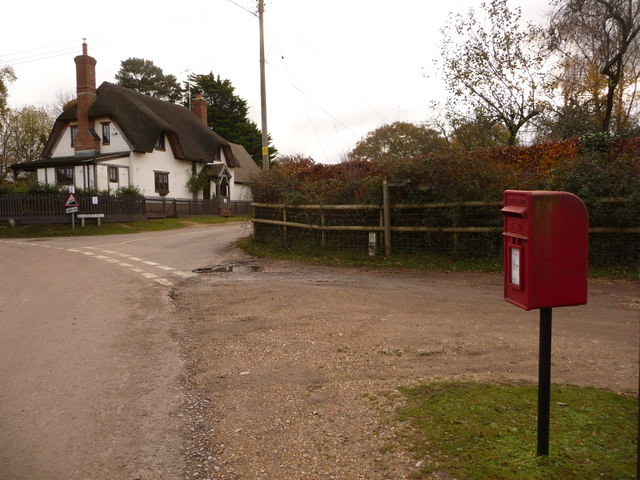
- Blissford

- Location within Hampshire
- OS grid reference: SU174135
- Civil parish: Hyde
- District: New Forest
- Shire county: Hampshire
- Region: South East
- Country: England
- Sovereign state: United Kingdom
- Post town: FORDINGBRIDGE
- Postcode district: SP6
- Dialling code: 01425
- Police: Hampshire and Isle of Wight
- Fire: Hampshire and Isle of Wight
- Ambulance: South Central
- UK Parliament: New Forest West

Blissford is a hamlet in the civil parish of Hyde situated in the New Forest National Park in Hampshire, England. Its nearest town is Fordingbridge, which lies approximately 2 miles (2.5 km) west from the village. The hamlet lies just to the north of the small village of Frogham. Blissford is situated on low ground around Blissford Cross and towards Ditchend Brook where the ford can be found. References to Blissford appear in records in the early 16th century. The houses in the hamlet are surrounded by patches of woodland and pasture, and there is also a small settlement of mobile homes sited on higher ground.
