= Gorley Lynch =

Hamlet in Hampshire, England

Coordinates: 50.906064°N 1.754551°W

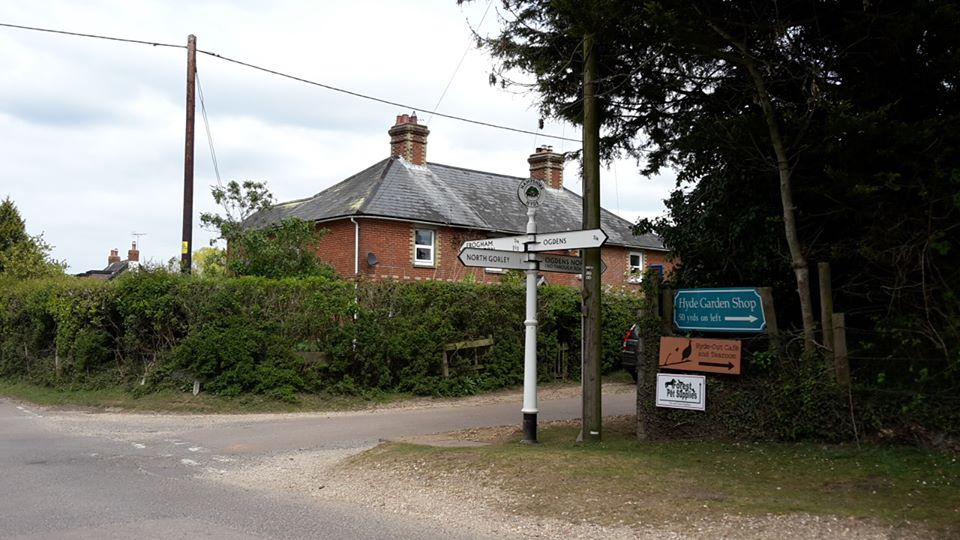
- Sign by Gorley Lynch

- Location within Hampshire
- OS grid reference: SU1735511872
- District: New Forest
- Shire county: Hampshire
- Region: South East
- Country: England
- Sovereign state: United Kingdom
- Post town: FORDINGBRIDGE
- Postcode district: SP6
- Dialling code: 01590
- Police: Hampshire and Isle of Wight
- Fire: Hampshire and Isle of Wight
- Ambulance: South Central
- UK Parliament: New Forest West

Gorley Lynch is a hamlet in the civil parish of Gorley in the New Forest National Park of Hampshire, England. It is in the civil parish of Hyde. Its nearest town is Fordingbridge, which lies approximately 3.2 miles (4.7 km) north-west from the hamlet.
