= Avon Valley Path =

Long-distance footpath in southern England

Coordinates: 51.067°N 1.798°W

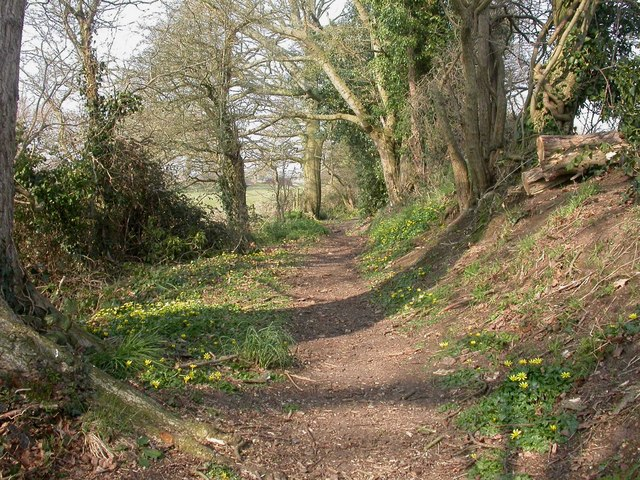
- Between Winkton and Burton in Dorset
- Length: 34 mi (55 km)
- Location: South west England
- Trailheads: Salisbury Cathedral, Wiltshire; Christchurch Priory, Dorset.
- Use: Hiking

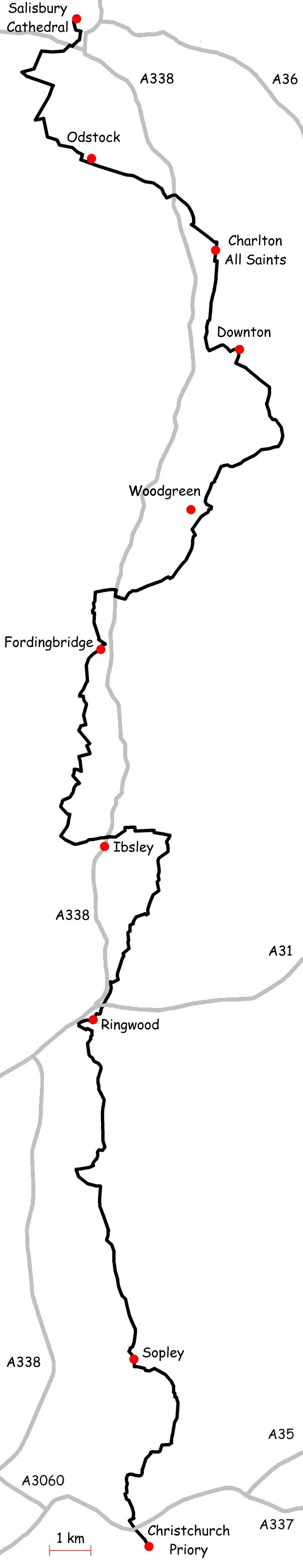
Avon Valley Path and nearby major roads, towns and villages

The Avon Valley Path is a long-distance path, opened in 1992, which runs for 34 miles (55 kilometres) through the English counties of Wiltshire, Hampshire and Dorset.

The path takes its name from the River Avon. From Salisbury it passes through the towns of Fordingbridge and Ringwood as well as the villages of Odstock, Nunton, Charlton-All-Saints, Downton, Hale, Woodgreen, Turmer, Ibsley, Kingston, Sopley and Burton. It ends near the coast at Christchurch Priory, Dorset.

The path is waymarked with green arrows featuring a bridge, and shown as a series of coloured diamonds on Ordnance Survey 1:25,000 and 1:50,000 maps. It can be walked in either direction. The path crosses the Clarendon Way and Castleman Trailway, and passes through the western edge of the New Forest.

Parts of the route can become waterlogged, particularly from December to May.

== See also ==
- Long-distance footpaths in the UK

Media related to Avon Valley Path at Wikimedia Commons
