= Highwood, Hampshire =

Hamlet in Hampshire, England

Coordinates: 50.866712°N 1.757608°W

Highwood
- Location within Hampshire
- OS grid reference: SU1715407495
- District: New Forest
- Shire county: Hampshire
- Region: South East
- Country: England
- Sovereign state: United Kingdom
- Post town: RINGWOOD
- Postcode district: BH24
- Dialling code: 01590
- Police: Hampshire and Isle of Wight
- Fire: Hampshire and Isle of Wight
- Ambulance: South Central
- UK Parliament: New Forest West

Highwood is a hamlet in the New Forest National Park of Hampshire, England. According to the Post Office the population of the hamlet at the 2011 Census was included in the civil parish of Ellingham, Harbridge and Ibsley. Its nearest town is Ringwood, which lies approximately 1.5 miles (2.4 km) south-west from the village.
