= Ellingham, Harbridge and Ibsley =

Civil parish in Hampshire, England

Coordinates: 50°53′00″N 01°45′45″W

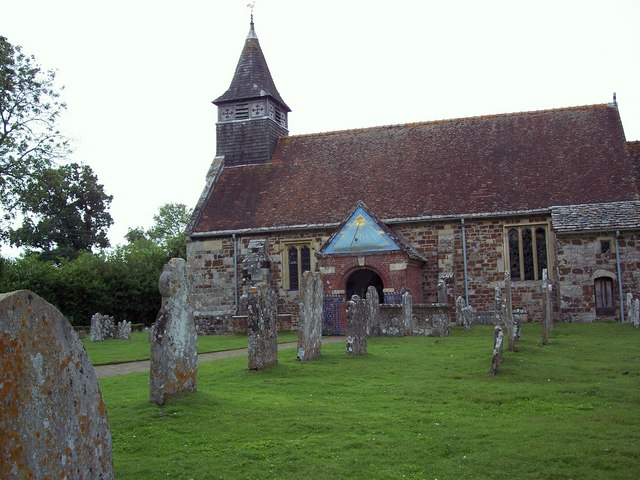
- Ellingham

- Location within Hampshire
- Population: 1,171 (2011 census)
- Civil parish: Ellingham, Harbridge and Ibsley
- District: New Forest
- Shire county: Hampshire
- Region: South East
- Country: England
- Sovereign state: United Kingdom
- Police: Hampshire and Isle of Wight
- Fire: Hampshire and Isle of Wight
- Ambulance: South Central

Ellingham, Harbridge and Ibsley is a civil parish in the New Forest district, in the west of the county of Hampshire, England. The population of the civil parish at the 2011 Census was 1,171.

The civil parish was formed on 1 April 1979 from "Ellingham" and Harbridge and Ibsley.

The main geographical features of the area are the A338 road (connecting Poole and Bournemouth with Salisbury) and the Hampshire Avon. The nearest towns are Ringwood and Fordingbridge.

Populated places in the parish include:

- Ellingham
- Furze Hill
- Harbridge
- Highwood
- Ibsley
- Linford
- Linwood
- Mockbeggar
- Moyles Court School
- Poulner
- Rockford
- Shobley
- Somerley
- South Gorley
- Turmer
