= Tipping baronets =

Extinct baronetcy in the Baronetage of England

- Escutcheon of the Tipping baronets of Wheatfield
- Creation date: 1698
- Status: extinct
- Extinction date: 1725

The Tipping Baronetcy, of Wheatfield in the County of Oxford, was a title in the Baronetage of England. It was created on 24 March 1698 for Thomas Tipping, Member of Parliament for Oxfordshire and Wallingford. He was the second son of Sir Thomas Tipping and the great-nephew of the religious writer William 'Eternity' Tipping. The title became extinct on the death of the second Baronet in 1725.

== Tipping baronets, of Wheatfield (1698) ==
- Sir Thomas Tipping, 1st Baronet (1653–1718)
- Sir Thomas Tipping, 2nd Baronet (1700–1725)
