= Harbridge =

Village and parish in Hampshire, England

Coordinates: 50°53′27″N 1°47′44″W

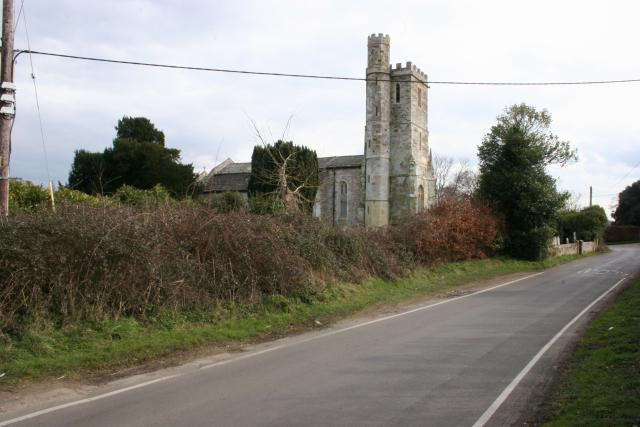
- Harbridge Church

- Location within Hampshire
- OS grid reference: SU144101
- Civil parish: Ellingham, Harbridge and Ibsley
- District: New Forest
- Shire county: Hampshire
- Region: South East
- Country: England
- Sovereign state: United Kingdom
- Post town: RINGWOOD
- Postcode district: BH24
- Dialling code: 01425
- Police: Hampshire and Isle of Wight
- Fire: Hampshire and Isle of Wight
- Ambulance: South Central
- UK Parliament: New Forest West

Harbridge is a small village and former civil parish, now in the parish of Ellingham, Harbridge and Ibsley, in the New Forest district, in the county of Hampshire, England. It is located some four kilometres (2.5 miles)north of Ringwood and a similar distance south of Fordingbridge, in southwest Hampshire. In 1931 the parish had a population of 276.

== Overview ==
The village of Harbridge is at the edge of the low meadow land to the west of the River Avon. To the south lies Somerley, home of the Earls of Normanton.

== History ==
The name Harbridge probably means "Hearda's bridge". In the Domesday Book of 1086, Bernard the Chamberlain held Harbridge from the King. Before 1066 it had been held by Ulveva. Harbridge is a referred to as a manor by the early 15th century. In the early 19th century the manor passed to the Earl of Normanton, and like nearby Ibsley and Ellingham became part of his estate of Somerley. On 1 April 1933 the parish was abolished and merged with Ibsley to form "Harbridge and Ibsley".

The church of All Saints consisting of chancel, nave, and west tower, was rebuilt in 1838. The tower retains its 15th-century masonry, but it was raised in the 19th-century reconstruction. Coade stone was used for various decorative elements during its reconstruction.
