= Shobley =

Hamlet in Hampshire, England

Coordinates: 50.857340°N 1.742797°W

- Location within Hampshire
- OS grid reference: SU1820006457
- Civil parish: Ellingham, Harbridge and Ibsley
- District: New Forest
- Shire county: Hampshire
- Region: South East
- Country: England
- Sovereign state: United Kingdom
- Post town: RINGWOOD
- Postcode district: BH24 3
- Dialling code: 01590
- Police: Hampshire and Isle of Wight
- Fire: Hampshire and Isle of Wight
- Ambulance: South Central
- UK Parliament: New Forest West

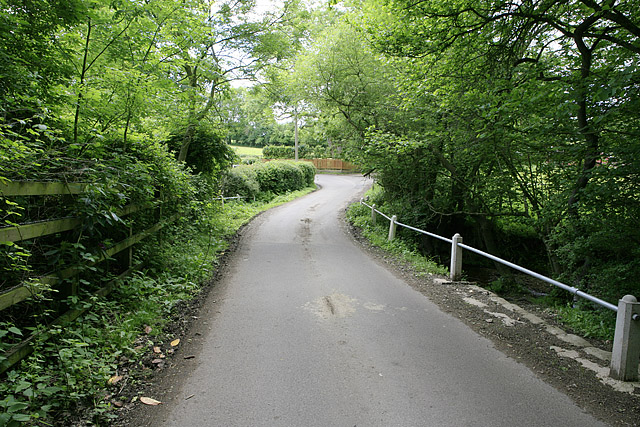
Shobley Road at Shobley Bottom. The road here descends into the Bottom and turns sharp left before climbing to Picket Hill. In the foreground a tributary of Lin Brook, having its source in the Bottom, flows left to right under the road.

Shobley is a hamlet in the New Forest National Park of Hampshire, England. Its nearest town is Ringwood, which lies approximately 1.8 miles (2.9 km) west from the hamlet. It is in the civil Parish of Ellingham, Harbridge and Ibsley.
