= Linwood, United Kingdom =

Linwood, United Kingdom may refer to:

- Linwood, Hampshire, England
- Linwood, Lincolnshire, England
- Linwood, Renfrewshire, Scotland
