= Sir Thomas Tipping, 1st Baronet =

English Member of Parliament

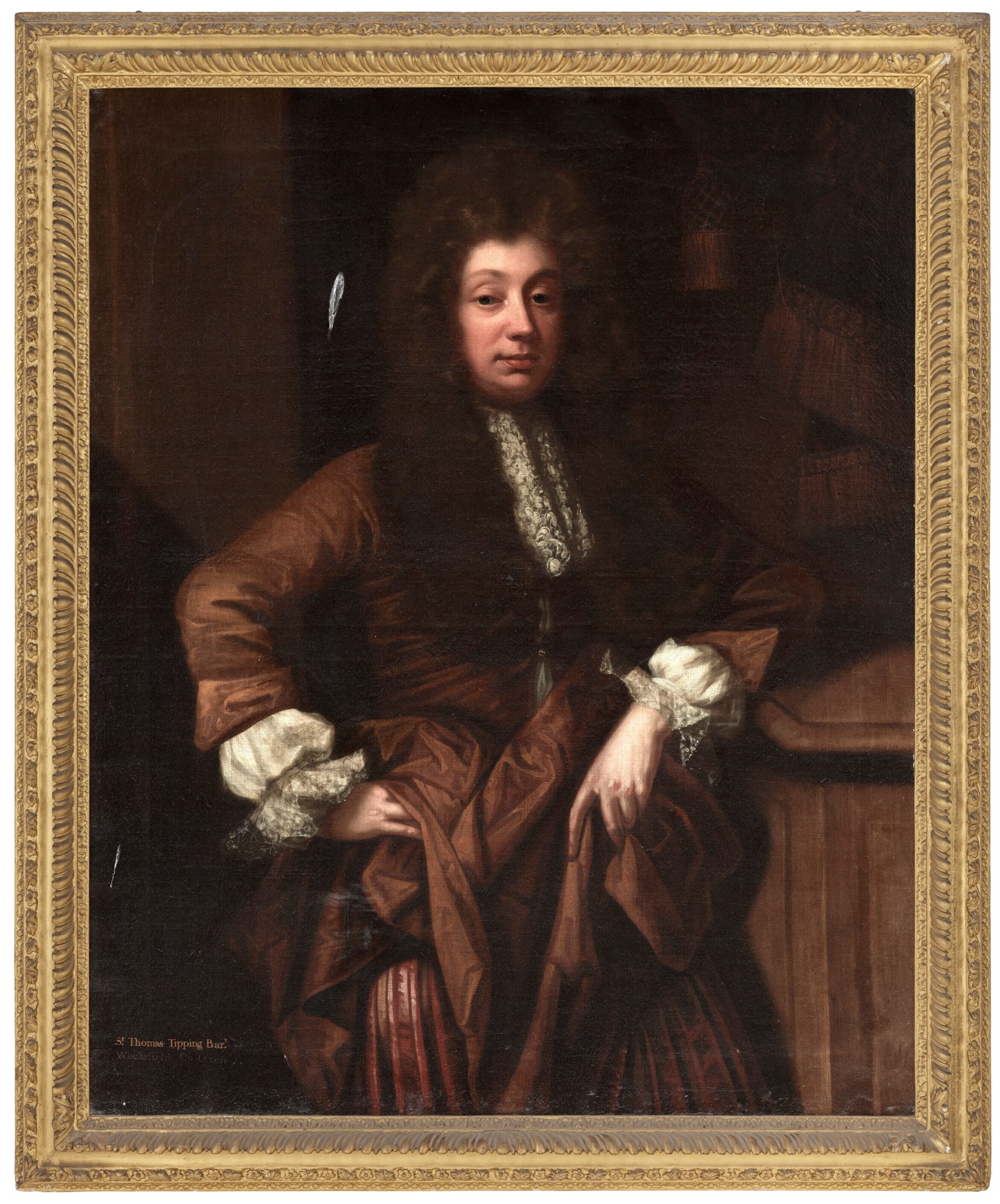
- portrait attributed to Sir Godfrey Kneller
- Born: 1653
- Died: 1718
- Spouse: Anne Cheeke
- Children: Sir Thomas Tipping, 2nd Baronet, Catherine Tipping, Laetitia Tipping
- Parents: Thomas Tipping (father); Elizabeth Beconshaw (mother)

Sir Thomas Tipping (baptized 29 April 1653 – 1 July 1718) was a late 17th-century English baronet and Member of Parliament.

== Family ==
Tipping was the second son, but tenth child, of Sir Thomas Tipping of Wheatfield, Oxfordshire by his wife, Elizabeth, daughter and co-heiress of Sir White Beconshaw of Moyles Court at Ellingham, Hampshire. Thomas Senior was the nephew of the Puritan writer, William 'Eternity' Tipping.

Tipping Junior's wife, Anne Cheke, the daughter of Thomas Cheke and Hon. Letitia Russell, sister of the leading Whig statesman Edward Russell, 1st Earl of Orford, had inherited Pyrgo Park at Havering-atte-Bower in Essex in 1659. The Dame Tipping school in Havering-atte-Bower was founded in 1724 and endowed from her death in 1728 by a legacy from her will. The couple inherited Wheatfield Park in 1693. They had two daughters – Letitia wife of Samuel Sandys, 1st Baron Sandys and Catherine wife of Thomas Archer, 1st Baron Archer – and a son, Thomas.

== Biography ==
Tipping entered Trinity College, Oxford in 1669, and Lincoln's Inn where he studied law in 1672.

Tipping became a notorious whig and was elected a Member of Parliament for Oxfordshire (1685) and then Wallingford (1689, 1695 and 1698). He was known for promoting a proviso to the bill for preserving James II's person; it would allow clergymen to speak out against Roman Catholicism. Later, however, he became infamous for having contrived to marry his ward to a prostitute of his acquaintance. He fled to the Netherlands for a while. He was listed as being opposed to the King in 1688 and joined William III upon his landing in England. Tipping then became an outspoken opponent of Jeffreys who had condemned to death, his maternal aunt Dame Alice Lisle. He did not seek re-election to Parliament in 1701 and in May 1713 he and his brother were reported to have "turned Tory".

Besides his political activities, Tipping was also a military officer as Lieutenant-Colonel in Lord Mordaunt's regiment of foot between 1688 and 1691.

He was made a baronet in 1698. In February 1704, he was given permission by the House of Lords "to sell the Manor of Ickford, in the County of Bucks, for the Payment of a Debt charged thereon". He died in debt, in prison, in Southwark on 1 July 1718, aged 65.

== See also ==
List of deserters from James II to William of Orange

Parliament of England
Preceded by Thomas Horde; Sir Philip Harcourt	Member of Parliament for Oxfordshire; 1685 – 1689; With: The Viscount Falkland	Succeeded by Sir Robert Jenkinson, Bt; Sir John Cope, Bt
Preceded by William Jennens; John Stone	Member of Parliament for Wallingford; 1689 – 1695; With: William Jennens	Succeeded by William Jennens; John Wallis
Preceded by William Jennens; John Wallis	Member of Parliament for Wallingford; 1695 – 1701; With: William Jennens to 1698; Richard Pye 1698–1701	Succeeded by William Jennens; Thomas Renda
Baronetage of England
New creation	Baronet (of Wheatfield); 1698–1718	Succeeded by Thomas Tipping
