= Gorley Hill =

Iron Age hillfort in Hampshire, England

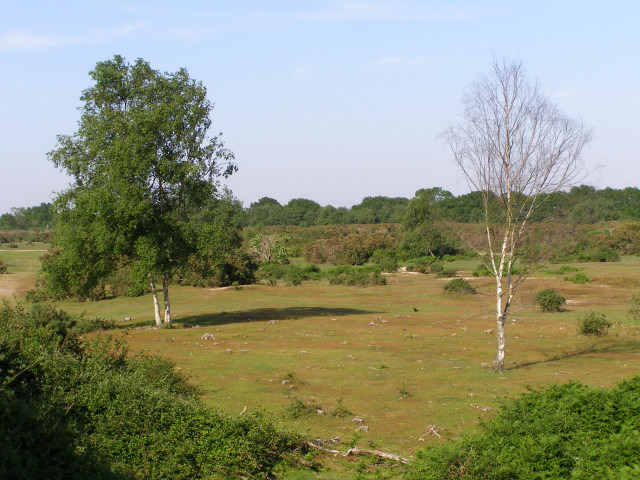

- Location within Hampshire
- 50.9027°N 1.7649°W
- Periods: Iron Age
- Location: Hampshire

Site notes
- Condition: Destroyed
- Public access: Yes

Gorley Hill is the site of a former Iron Age promontory hillfort located in Hampshire in the United Kingdom.

The fort once occupied the southwestern corner of Gorley Common on Gorley Hill, a gravel-capped spur that points southwest into the Avon valley next to the hamlet of North Gorley, between the towns of Fordingbridge and Ringwood. The earthworks were destroyed in the 1950s and '60s when the common's new owners carried out large-scale gravel extraction works, effectively "scalping" the hill. The tall linear earthen banks present on the hill are a relic of the quarrying process and not prehistoric in origin. The site is now grass, with some gorse and silver birch. The area is now owned and managed by Hampshire County Council.

Heywood Sumner carried out some excavation at the site which was published in his 1917 book Ancient Earthworks of the New Forest.

== Location ==
The site is located at grid reference SU164113, and lies between the hamlets of South Gorley and North Gorley, in the county of Hampshire. Immediately to the South lies Huckles Brook, a tributary of the River Avon, which itself lies to the west. The hill has a summit of 70m AOD.
