= North Gorley =

Hamlet in Hampshire, England

Coordinates: 50.9023°N 1.7732°W

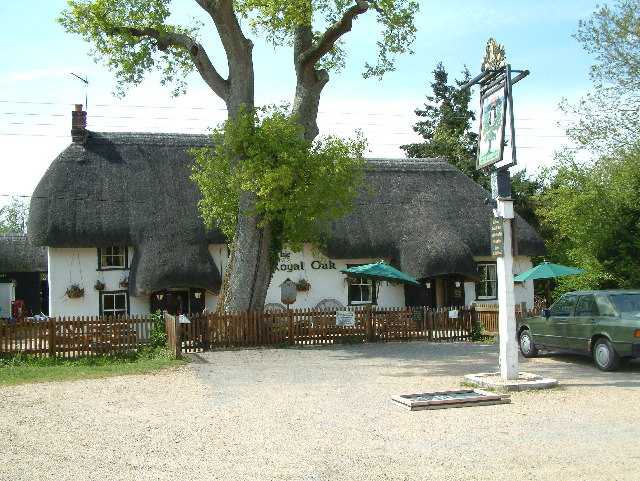
- The Royal Oak, North Gorley

- Location within Hampshire
- OS grid reference: SU160114
- Civil parish: Hyde
- District: New Forest
- Shire county: Hampshire
- Region: South East
- Country: England
- Sovereign state: United Kingdom
- Post town: Fordingbridge
- Postcode district: SP6
- Dialling code: 01425
- Police: Hampshire and Isle of Wight
- Fire: Hampshire and Isle of Wight
- Ambulance: South Central
- UK Parliament: New Forest West

North Gorley is a hamlet in the New Forest National Park of Hampshire, England. Its nearest town is Fordingbridge, which lies approximately 2 miles (3.2 km) north of the hamlet.

== Location ==
The hamlet of North Gorley sits on the western boundary of the New Forest National Park, about 0.5 miles (0.80 km) north of South Gorley. The River Avon lies just to the west. The hamlet has one inn, The Royal Oak, which claims to be a former Royal hunting lodge. There is also a restaurant known as Little Mere, which also operates as tea rooms in the summer months.

== History ==
The name Gorley means "triangular wood/clearing". In 1086 Osbern the Falconer held the manor of Gorley from the King. Two manors of "North Gorley" existed in the 16th century. One was in the possession of John Bulkeley, which apparently passed to the Keilways of Rockbourne before 1576. It was purchased by Sir John Cooper in 1608, and evidently merged in Rockbourne. The other manor was acquired by the Abbot and convent of Beaulieu from Margery Rivers, John Rivers and others, and was probably granted, after the Dissolution, with Freren Court to Robert White, to whom it belonged in 1564, from which date it followed the descent of Rockford, being merged in that manor after 1634–5.

North Gorley was, unlike South Gorley, in the parish of Fordingbridge. In 1855 it was incorporated in the new ecclesiastical parish of Hyde, and it is now part of the civil parish of Hyde.

== Gorley Hill ==
To the east of North Gorley on Gorley Common was the site of an Iron Age promontory hillfort called Gorley Hill. Much of the site was destroyed in the 1950s and 60s when the Common's new owners carried out large-scale gravel extraction works.
