= Hyde, Hampshire =

Village and parish in Hampshire, England

Coordinates: 50.91007°N 1.75961°W

Hyde
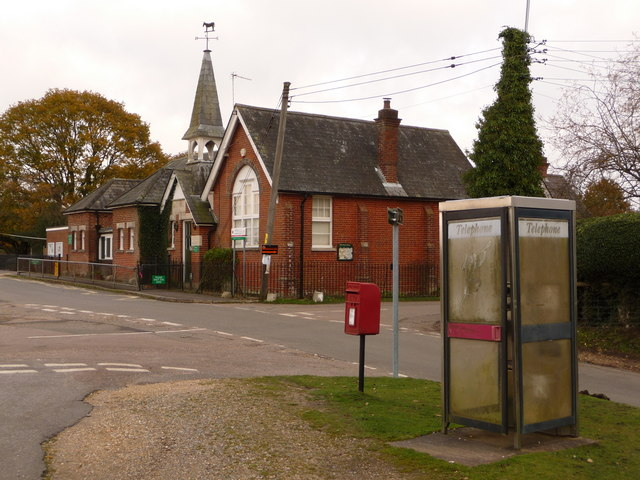
- Hyde village school

- Location within Hampshire
- Population: 906; 928 (2011 Census including Frogham and Gorley Lynch)
- OS grid reference: SU169123
- District: New Forest
- Shire county: Hampshire
- Region: South East
- Country: England
- Sovereign state: United Kingdom
- Post town: FORDINGBRIDGE
- Postcode district: SP6
- Dialling code: 01425
- Police: Hampshire and Isle of Wight
- Fire: Hampshire and Isle of Wight
- Ambulance: South Central
- UK Parliament: New Forest West

Hyde is a village and civil parish in the New Forest near Fordingbridge in Hampshire, England.

== Overview ==
The parish of Hyde is mostly within the boundary of the New Forest National Park. It includes the hamlets of Blissford, Frogham, Furze Hill, Hungerford, North Gorley, Ogdens, and Stuckton, as well as tracts of New Forest heathland centred on the Latchmore Brook to the east.

The parish has 383 occupied houses, an infant/junior school, a village hall, and two pubs.

== History ==
Historically Hyde was a hamlet belonging to the parish of Fordingbridge. The ecclesiastical parish of Hyde was formed in 1855 from part of the parish of Fordingbridge. The church of the Holy Ascension was built in 1855, and is of red brick with stone dressings and consists of chancel, nave, north vestry, south porch and western turret containing two bells. Hyde primary school was built in 1885.

The village of Hyde remained in the civil parish of Fordingbridge, although from 1868 lands to the east of the village were part of a parish called Ashley Walk, which lasted until 1932 when Ashley Walk was incorporated into an enlarged Fordingbridge parish. The civil parish of Hyde was created in 1979.

The former Admiral of the Fleet, Peter Hill-Norton, lived in Hyde in his retirement.
