= John Hickes (minister) =

John Hickes or Hicks (1633–1685), was an English nonconformist minister.

Hickes was the brother of George Hickes, born at Moorhouse, Kirby Wiske, North Riding of Yorkshire. He was a student and then fellow of Trinity College, Dublin. He was ejected from Saltash, Cornwall after the Act of Uniformity 1662.

Hickes presented a petition to Charles II in favour of nonconformists. Under James II he joined the Duke of Monmouth's Rebellion in 1685 and was sheltered by Alice Lisle. He was tried and executed at Taunton.

== Publications ==
Hickes' works include;

- Troublous times; or, Leaves from the note-book of (Jackson, Walford, & Hoddler, 1862), with Jane Bowring Cranch
- A true and faithful narrative of the unjust and illegal sufferings, and oppressions of many Christians ... in the county of Devon, since the tenth of May, 1670
- A discourse of the excellency of the heavenly substance which is useful for the present, and so may be for future times. (London printed: [s.n.], 1673)
- The last speech, of that pious and [lear]ned divine Mr. John Hicks who was executed at Glassenbury, Octob. 1685. ([London: s.n., 1685])
