= Ogdens =

Hamlet in Hampshire, England

Coordinates: 50.9103°N 01.7466°W

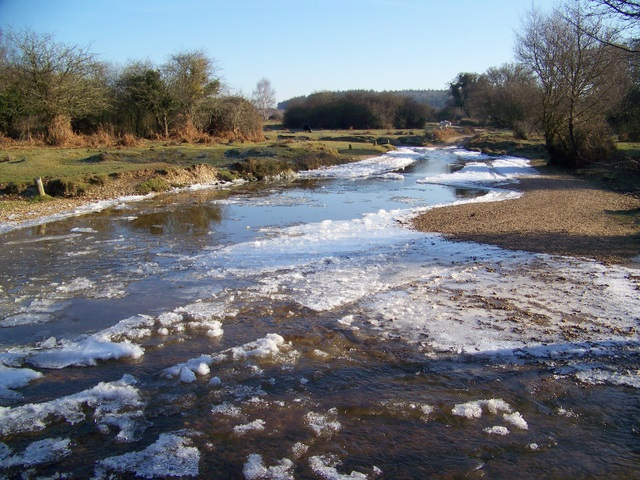
- Huckles Brook near Ogdens Farm

- Location within Hampshire
- OS grid reference: SU178121
- Civil parish: Hyde
- District: New Forest
- Shire county: Hampshire
- Region: South East
- Country: England
- Sovereign state: United Kingdom
- Post town: FORDINGBRIDGE
- Postcode district: SP6
- Dialling code: 01425
- Police: Hampshire and Isle of Wight
- Fire: Hampshire and Isle of Wight
- Ambulance: South Central

Ogdens is a small hamlet south of Hyde Common near Frogham in the New Forest area of Hampshire, England.

Ogdens is a hamlet in the civil parish of Hyde. It is situated in the valley of Latchmore Brook (or Huckles Brook). Most of the settlement is surrounded by the heathland and woodland of the New Forest. The hamlet is very rural with a few post-war dwellings, mixed in with older houses scattered on tracks and farmland. There is a car park at Ogdens allowing access to the heathland of the New Forest. Nearby is Ogdens Purlieu, a boggy area of heathland between Ogdens and Dockens Water.

The hamlet is named after Ogden Rooke, a local landowner who possessed Ogdens Purlieu in the latter half of the 17th century. Purlieu is a Norman-French word meaning "the outskirts of a forest" – a place free from forest laws.
