= Linford, Hampshire =

Hamlet in Hampshire, England

Coordinates: 50.862°N 1.744°W

Linford is a hamlet in the New Forest district of Hampshire, England, close to the market town of Ringwood. It is about 1.5 miles east of Ringwood. It is in the civil parish of Ellingham, Harbridge and Ibsley.
