= Stuckton =

Hamlet in Hampshire, England

Coordinates: 50.9193°N 1.7729°W

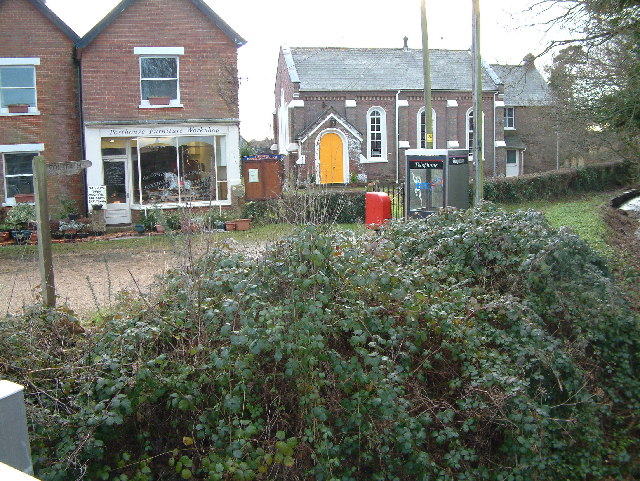
- Stuckton

- Location within Hampshire
- OS grid reference: SU160133
- Civil parish: Hyde
- District: New Forest
- Shire county: Hampshire
- Region: South East
- Country: England
- Sovereign state: United Kingdom
- Post town: FORDINGBRIDGE
- Postcode district: SP6 2
- Dialling code: 01425
- Police: Hampshire and Isle of Wight
- Fire: Hampshire and Isle of Wight
- Ambulance: South Central
- UK Parliament: New Forest West

Stuckton is a hamlet in the New Forest National Park of Hampshire, England. Its nearest town is Fordingbridge, which lies approximately 1 mile (1.7 km) north-west from the village.

Stuckton is a hamlet in the civil parish of Hyde. It is located in the Avon valley and is situated around Ditchend Brook. The western side of the hamlet is outside the New Forest National Park. The hamlet contains several Victorian buildings, and also has a small chapel, sited behind the old post office. Stuckton is known locally for the hotel and restaurant called The Three Lions.

Stuckton was once home to the "Stuckton Iron Works" which came into existence around 1770 as an iron foundry and farm machinery works. A Cornish engine provided power for the works, forge and pattern shop. It is said, but not verified, that the first portable steam traction engines were made here in the early 19th century. The Stuckton foundry closed down in 1908, but agricultural machinery side of the business continued as the Armfields Engineering Company.
