= Mockbeggar, Hampshire =

Hamlet in Hampshire, England

Coordinates: 50.884976°N 1.772995°W

Mockbeggar
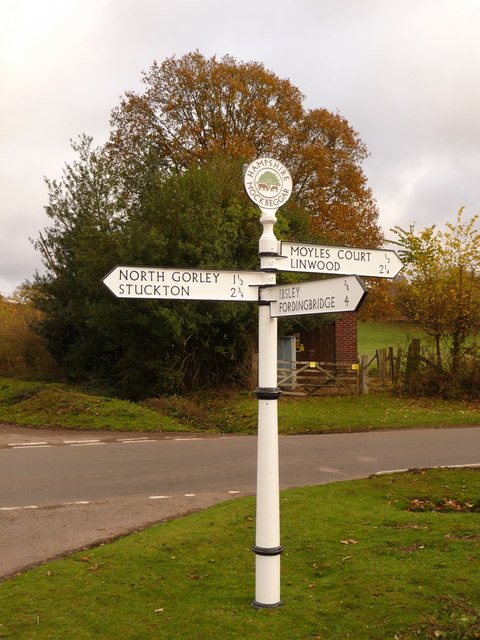
- Post at Mockbeggar

- Location within Hampshire
- OS grid reference: SU1606509523
- Civil parish: Ellingham, Harbridge and Ibsley
- District: New Forest
- Shire county: Hampshire
- Region: South East
- Country: England
- Sovereign state: United Kingdom
- Post town: RINGWOOD
- Postcode district: BH24
- Dialling code: 01425
- Police: Hampshire and Isle of Wight
- Fire: Hampshire and Isle of Wight
- Ambulance: South Central
- UK Parliament: New Forest West

Mockbeggar is a hamlet in the New Forest National Park of Hampshire, England. Its nearest town is Ringwood, which lies approximately 3 miles (5.6 km) south-west from the hamlet. It is in the civil parish of Ellingham, Harbridge and Ibsley.
