= Ellingham, Hampshire =

Village and parish in Hampshire, England

Coordinates: 50.8733°N 1.7967°W

Ellingham
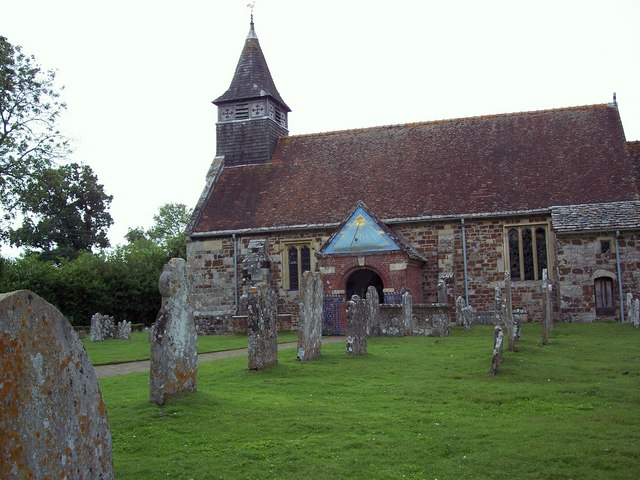
- St Mary and All Saints Church, Ellingham

- Location within Hampshire
- OS grid reference: SU1408
- Civil parish: Ellingham, Harbridge and Ibsley
- District: New Forest
- Shire county: Hampshire
- Region: South East
- Country: England
- Sovereign state: United Kingdom
- Post town: RINGWOOD
- Postcode district: BH24
- Dialling code: 01425
- Police: Hampshire and Isle of Wight
- Fire: Hampshire and Isle of Wight
- Ambulance: South Central
- UK Parliament: New Forest West

Ellingham is a small village and former civil parish, now in the parish of Ellingham, Harbridge and Ibsley, in the New Forest district, in the county of Hampshire, England. It is near Ringwood, west of the New Forest National Park. Ellingham is most famous for the story of Alice Lisle, who was executed by the infamous Judge Jeffreys in 1685, on the charge of harbouring fugitives after the defeat of the Monmouth Rebellion. In 1961 the parish had a population of 595.

== Overview ==
Ellingham is a small village near Ringwood in Hampshire. It contains the hamlet of Rockford, and Moyles Court, the large house which is now a school. The village and surrounding countryside are a large tourist attraction in the summer months. Much of the area around Ellingham was once farmland and woodland, but since the 1950s sand and gravel extraction has created a series of lakes known collectively as Blashford Lakes. These lakes now separate Ellingham church from the rest of the former parish around Rockford and Moyles Court. Alice Lisle has an inn named after her in Rockford.

== History ==
The name Ellingham may mean "Æthelingas' estate". In the Domesday Book of 1086, Cola the Huntsman held Ellingham from the King. In 1160 William de Solers was holding the manor and granted Ellingham church, and lands in Ellingham, to the Abbey of Saint-Sauveur-le-Vicomte in Normandy. William de Punchardon held the manor in the reign of Richard I, and it descended, like Faccombe, with the Punchardons until 1499. It then passed by descent into the Okeden family who held it until the middle of the 17th century.

William Beconshaw died seised of the manor in 1634–5. His son, Sir White Beconshaw, died in 1638, and it passed to his two daughters, Elizabeth wife of Thomas Tipping and Alice Lisle wife of John Lisle. In 1658 a final settlement by which Ellingham passed to the Lisles was ratified by William Okeden. John Lisle was assassinated while in exile in Switzerland in 1664, for his part in the execution of Charles I. Alice Lisle, who lived in the Elizabethan house of Moyles Court, was one of the victims of the infamous Judge Jeffreys. Charged with harbouring fugitives after the defeat of the Monmouth Rebellion at the Battle of Sedgemoor, she was executed in 1685.

Ellingham remained in the Lisle family until the death of Charles Lisle, who died unmarried in 1818. His nephew Edward Hayles Taylor, who took the name of Lisle in 1822, sold the manor soon afterwards to the Earl of Normanton, whose family seat was (and still is) at nearby Somerley.

On 1 April 1979 the parish was abolished and merged with Harbridge & Ibsley to form "Ellingham, Harbridge & Ibsley".

== Moyles Court ==
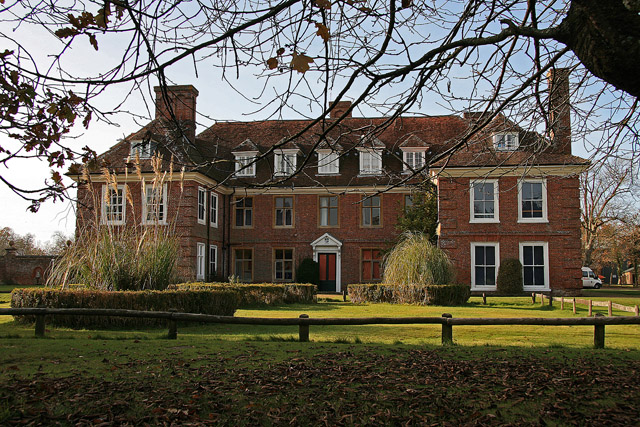
Moyles Court

Moyles Court was the house of the manor of Rockford. Rockford is listed in the Domesday Book of 1086 when it was held by Hugh of St Quentin, but by the 13th century it had passed to the Moels family and Rockford stayed in that family until the death of John de Moels in 1337. In the 17th century Rockford passed, like Ellingham, to the Lisle family. Moyles Court (named after the 13th-century family) in Rockford became their chief residence. Alice Lisle continued to live at Moyles Court after her husband's assassination until her own notorious trial and execution in 1685. In the 19th century Moyles Court was sold to the Earl of Normanton with Ellingham.

Moyles Court is now used as a school – Moyles Court School. The 18th-Century building which has become "The Alice Lisle Inn" was formerly the village school for Rockford.

== Ellingham church ==
Ellingham church was built in the 13th century. It is thought that there was an earlier, probably Saxon, church on the site. It is described in early charters as the church of St Mary or as the church of All Saints with the chapel of St Mary. It was added to in the 15th century, and the red-brick west wall was rebuilt in 1746. The church was restored 1869-90 by Thomas Graham Jackson. It has a large blue sundial located over the porch of the church. The tomb of Alice Lisle can be found in the church.

== Ellingham Priory ==
Ellingham Priory was founded by William de Soleres in 1160. It was a cell to the Abbey of Saint-Sauveur-le-Vicomte in Normandy. Ellingham church formed part of the grant of William de Solers to Ellingham Priory. The priory was dissolved in 1414 and sold to Eton College in 1462. All that remains of the priory is the church.
