= John Lisle =

English lawyer and politician

Coat of Arms of John Lisle

Sir John Lisle (1610 – 11 August 1664) was an English lawyer and politician who sat in the House of Commons at various times between 1640 and 1659. He supported the Parliamentarian cause in the English Civil War and was one of the regicides of King Charles I of England. He was assassinated by an agent of the crown while in exile in Switzerland.

== Education and career ==
Lisle was educated at Magdalen Hall, Oxford and graduated with a BA in 1626. He was called to the bar at Middle Temple in 1633. In April 1640 he was elected Member of Parliament for Winchester in the Short Parliament. He was re-elected MP for Winchester for the Long Parliament in November 1640. He was master of St Cross Hospital, Winchester from 1644 to 1649.

Lisle was a member of the Rump Parliament and was one of the managers in the trial of Charles I in 1649. He was appointed one of the commissioners of the great seal, and was placed on the council of state in 1649. He also became a bencher of his Inn in 1649. In 1654 he was elected MP for Southampton for the First Protectorate Parliament and was re-elected for the seat in 1656 for the Second Protectorate Parliament. He held various offices in parliaments between 1654 and 1659 when he sat in the Restored Rump. In 1660, he was commissioner of the admiralty and navy.

At the Restoration of the monarchy Lisle fled to Switzerland. He was assassinated in a churchyard in Lausanne on 11 August 1664 by Sir James Fitz Edmond Cotter, an Irish soldier and Royalist agent who tracked down regicides and who is said to have used the alias Thomas Macdonnell.

== Personal life ==
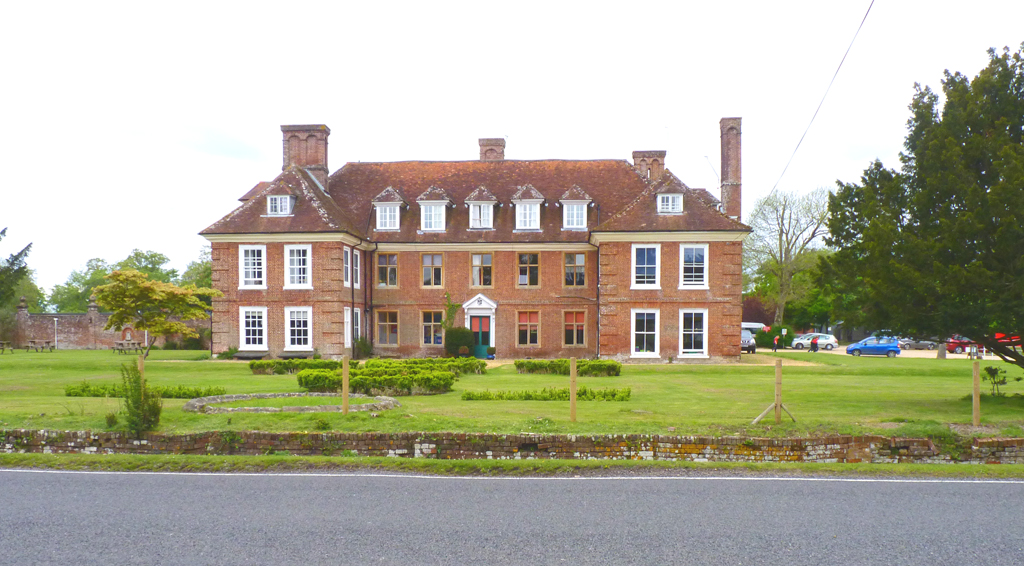
Moyles Court, now Moyles Court School

Lisle married firstly Elizabeth Hobart, daughter of Sir Henry Hobart, 1st Baronet of Intwood, who bore him a son who died in infancy. After her death in 1633, he married Alice Beconshaw, daughter of Sir White Beconshaw of Moyles Court at Ellingham in Hampshire and his wife, Edith, daughter of William Bond of Blackmanston, Steeple, Dorset. Alice bore him seven children, one of whom, John, inherited Moyles Court.

Alice was executed in 1685 at Winchester on a charge of harbouring fugitives after the Battle of Sedgemoor. The conduct of the trial, where Judge Jeffreys, presiding, applied intense pressure on the jury to convict, caused much unfavourable comment; and the refusal of King James II to heed pleas for mercy gave rise to a belief that he was taking posthumous revenge on Sir John himself. Another of John's children, Bridget, married Leonard Hoar, the 3rd President of Harvard College.

== See also ==
- List of regicides of Charles I

Parliament of England
Vacant Parliament suspended since 1629	Member of Parliament for Winchester; 1640–1653; With: Sir William Ogle 1640–1643; Nicholas Love 1645–1653	Not represented in Barebones Parliament
Vacant Not represented in Barebones Parliament	Member of Parliament for Southampton; 1654–1656	Succeeded by Thomas Knollys; Roger Gallop
Preceded by Nicholas Love; John Hildesley	Member of Parliament for Winchester; 1659; With: Nicholas Love	Succeeded by John Hooke; Thomas Cole
