= Nicholas Love =

English lawyer and one of the Regicides of King Charles I of England

Nicholas Love (1608–1682) was an English lawyer and one of the Regicides of King Charles I of England.

Love was educated at Winchester College and Wadham College, Oxford; M.A., 1636; barrister, Lincoln's Inn, 1636. His father, also Nicholas Love (d. 10 Sept 1630) was the warden of Winchester college from 1613.

He was elected M.P. for Winchester in 1645. Love was one of the judges at the trial of Charles I, but did not sign the death warrant. He retained his seat as M.P. for Winchester, in the Rump Parliament of 1659. At the restoration of the monarchy in 1660 he escaped to Switzerland. He died at Vevey in 1682.
