= Gorle =

Gorle may refer to:

== People ==
- F. H. Gorle (died 1931), British social democratic activist
- Robert Vaughan Gorle (1896–1937), English recipient of the Victoria Cross
- Terry Alan Gorle (1959–), American guitarist and composer, founder of the band Heir Apparent
- Prajwal Gorle(1999-), Indian Science Enthusiast

== Places ==
- Gorle, Lombardy, Italy
- Görle, Karacasu, Turkey
