= Gourley =

Gourley is a surname. Notable people with the surname include:

- Brenda Gourley (born 1943), fourth Vice-Chancellor of the Open University
- Cyril Edward Gourley (1893–1982), English recipient of the Victoria Cross
- Edward Temperley Gourley (1826–1902), English businessman and Member of Parliament for Sunderland
- Henry I. Gourley (1838–1899), Mayor of Pittsburgh, Pennsylvania, from 1890 to 1893
- John Gourley (born 1981), American singer, musician, and songwriter
- Matt Gourley (born 1973), American actor, comedian, and podcaster
- Neil Gourley (born 1995), Scottish middle distance runner
- Noeline Gourley (1925–2022), New Zealand sportswoman
- Paul Gourley, former National Chairman of the College Republican National Committee in the United States
- Robin Gourley (1935–2021), Irish-Australian rugby union and rugby league footballer
- Scott Gourley (born 1968), Australian rugby union and rugby league footballer

== See also ==
- Gourley Township, Michigan, USA
