= Linwood, Hampshire =

Hamlet in Hampshire, England

Coordinates: 50.882941°N 1.731357°W

Linwood
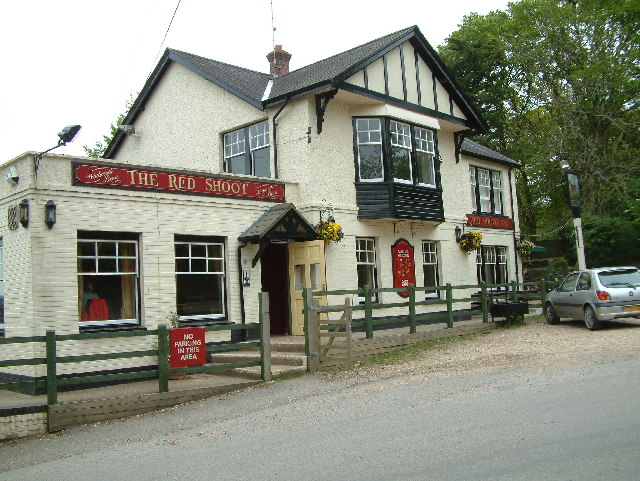
- The Red Shoot Inn, Linwood

- Location within Hampshire
- OS grid reference: SU1899509307
- Civil parish: Ellingham, Harbridge and Ibsley
- District: New Forest
- Shire county: Hampshire
- Region: South East
- Country: England
- Sovereign state: United Kingdom
- Post town: RINGWOOD
- Postcode district: BH24
- Dialling code: 01590
- Police: Hampshire and Isle of Wight
- Fire: Hampshire and Isle of Wight
- Ambulance: South Central
- UK Parliament: New Forest West

Linwood is a small hamlet in the New Forest National Park of Hampshire, England. Its nearest town is Ringwood, which lies approximately 4.2 miles (5.9 km) south-west from the village. It is in the civil parish of Ellingham, Harbridge and Ibsley. The village has one pub, named the Red Shoot Inn and a camping park, named the Red Shoot Camping Park.

The wildlife film maker Eric Ashby lived at Linwood from 1953 until his death in 2003.

== Notable residents ==
- Joseph Brittan (1806-1867), an influential person in the early settlement of Christchurch, New Zealand

== See also ==
- Linwood, New Zealand
