= Moyles Court School =

School in Hampshire, England

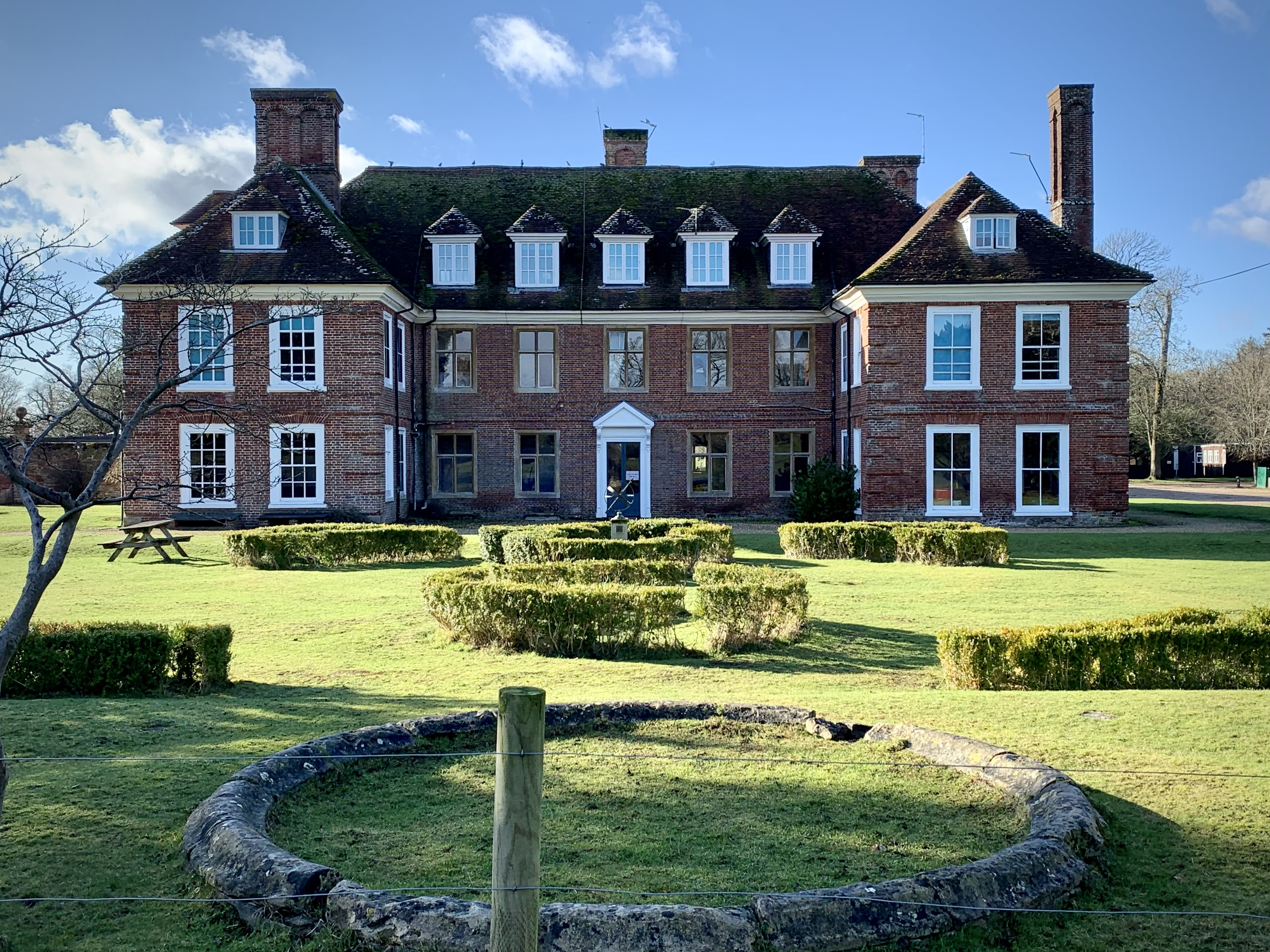

Location
- Rockford; Hampshire; England; 50.8758362°N 1.773452°W

Information
- Type: Independent School
- Motto: "Resurgam" - "I shall rise again"
- Established: 1963
- Headmaster: Robin Padfield
- Gender: Coeducational
- Age range: 2 to 16
- Enrollment: c. 200
- Campus size: 14 acres
- Houses: Dockens, Latchmore, Linford
- Colours: Red, black
- Website: moylescourt.co.uk

Moyles Court School is a private school located in Rockford, Hampshire, for children aged 2 to 16 years. Its last Headmaster was Robin Padfield.

== History ==
The school was established in the 1940s, in Bude, North Cornwall. It was briefly moved to a manor house in Wimborne, Dorset before the then-headteacher, Vesper Hunter, oversaw the move to the current site in 1963. The main building at Moyles Court - the current site - was the former manor house of Rockford, and later Ellingham. The 17th century manor house was once the home of Dame Alice Lisle, the last woman to be publicly beheaded in England following a judicial trial. In 1940 Moyles Court was requisitioned by the RAF as the station Headquarters of the RAF Ibsley Airfield and later derequisitioned in 1946. Whilst they resided here the officers were known to have used the lawn for tennis.

In 1962, the 53-acre (21 ha) estate was sold at an auction advertised and conducted by Woolley and Wallis. In all, ten lots were sold, including the one containing the current school on 14 acres (5.7 ha) of land.

The school was acquired in 2014 by Broadway Education.

In November 2023, the school was closed due to flooding from Storm Ciarán.

A new Headteacher was appointed in September 2025. In March 2026, it was announced that the school is to close down in August 2026.

== The School ==
The Early Years part of the school caters for ages 2–4 (Preschool and Year R), with the Junior School covering Years 1–6. The Senior School takes pupils from Years 7-11. The school also accommodates boarders from Years 3-11.

Moyles Court is known for its holistic approach to teaching, and the use of the immediate environment in The New Forest to capture the imagination of its children, as demonstrated in 2019 when the school raised ponies before putting them out to graze on the forest in line with the school's Common rights.

The school is a member of the Independent Schools Council and of the Boarding Schools’ Association.

Moyles Court has enjoyed enviable GCSE results in the past, and continues to perform well.

== Headteachers ==
- Miss F. M. Wilde, 1940 - 1958 (founder of the school)
- Miss Vesper Hunter, 1958 - 1975 (oversaw the move to Moyles Court in 1963)
- Mr C. J. Bryon Edmond, 1975 - 1978
- Mr. G. H. L. Rimbault, 1978 - 1979
- Miss Betty Hall, 1979 - 1983
- Mrs. Diana Hitchcock, 1983 - 1988
- Mr. Anthony Coghill, 1988 - 1993
- Mr. Richard Dean, 1993 - 2008
- Mr. Greg Meakin, 2008 - 2014
- Mr. Richard Milner-Smith, 2014–2025
- Mr. Craig Wardle, 2025
- Mr. Robin Padfield, 2025–2026

== Inspection Reports ==
The school has been inspected by the ISI (Independent Schools Inspectorate), and gained a ‘Good’ rating across the board in 2018. It also received a satisfactory compliance report from ISI in January 2023.
