= Alice Lisle =

Lady Lisle, executed for treason in 1685

- Born: 1617
- Died: September 2, 1685 (aged 67–68); Winchester, England
- Burial place: Ellingham, Hampshire, England
- Spouse: John Lisle
- Children: 7
- Relatives: Thomas Tipping (Brother-in-law)

Alice, Lady Lisle (September 1617 – 2 September 1685), commonly known as Alicia Lisle or Dame Alice Lyle, was a landed lady of the English county of Hampshire, who was executed for harbouring fugitives after the defeat of the Monmouth Rebellion at the Battle of Sedgemoor. While she seems to have leaned to Royalism, she combined this with a decided sympathy for religious dissent. She is known to history as Lady Lisle although she has no claim to the title; her husband John Lisle was a member of the "Other House" created by Oliver Cromwell and "titles" deriving from that fact were often used after the Restoration. She is the last woman to have been executed by a judicial sentence of beheading in England.

== Family ==
Alice was a daughter of Sir White Beconshaw of Moyles Court at Ellingham in Hampshire and his wife Edith Bond, daughter and co-heiress of William Bond of Blackmanston in Steeple, Dorset. She had a younger sister, Elizabeth, who married Sir Thomas Tipping of Wheatfield Park in Stoke Talmage in Oxfordshire. Alice became the second wife of John Lisle (1610 – 11 August 1664), and bore him seven children. Lisle was an English lawyer and politician who sat in the House of Commons at various times between 1640 and 1659. He supported the Parliamentarian cause in the English Civil War and was one of the regicides of King Charles I of England. Fearing for his life after the Restoration he fled to Switzerland, but was assassinated by an agent of the crown in Lausanne in 1664. This connection may have influenced the harshness with which she was treated.

== After Sedgemoor ==
On 20 July 1685, a fortnight after the Battle of Sedgemoor, Lady Lisle agreed to shelter John Hickes, a well-known Nonconformist minister, at Moyles Court, her residence near Ringwood. Hickes, who was a member of Monmouth's defeated army, brought with him Richard Nelthorpe, another supporter of Monmouth and under sentence of outlawry. The men spent the night at Moyles Court, and in the morning were arrested. Their hostess, who had initially denied their presence, was charged with harbouring traitors.

== Trial ==
Lady Lisle's case was tried by Judge Jeffreys at the opening of the Bloody Assizes at Winchester. She pleaded she had no knowledge that Hickes's offence was anything more serious than illegal preaching. Furthermore, she had known nothing of Nelthorpe, who was not named in the indictment, but was nevertheless mentioned to strengthen the case for the Crown. She said she had no sympathy with the rebellion whatsoever.

Jeffreys' conduct of the trial later has come to define him for historians. He showed no pretence of impartiality, becoming "an eloquent addition to the prosecution", in the words of 21st-century historian Charles Spencer. Repeatedly he reminded the jury of John Lisle's role in the trial and execution of Charles I, always with the admonition that they should not consider it when weighing the question of her guilt. When the jurors expressed doubt about the case, he responded that "there is as full proof as proof can be ... for my part, I thought there was no difficulty in it".

His antipathy to Lady Lisle, who often fell asleep during the trial, was obvious: when she asked if she would be allowed to speak in her own defence, Jeffreys reminded her that her husband had once condemned a man (King Charles I) to death without letting him speak. The jury reluctantly, after much pressure from Jeffreys, found her guilty after fifteen minutes of deliberation. As the law recognized no distinction between principals and accessories in treason, she was sentenced to be burned at the stake. Jeffreys said that he would have found her guilty "even if she had been [his] own mother". Brian Harris QC rejects much of the criticism of Jeffreys. 'Ultimately, while Jeffreys’ conduct of the trial was not faultless, it was not the judge's conduct but the strength of the evidence against Alice which secured her conviction.'

== Execution ==
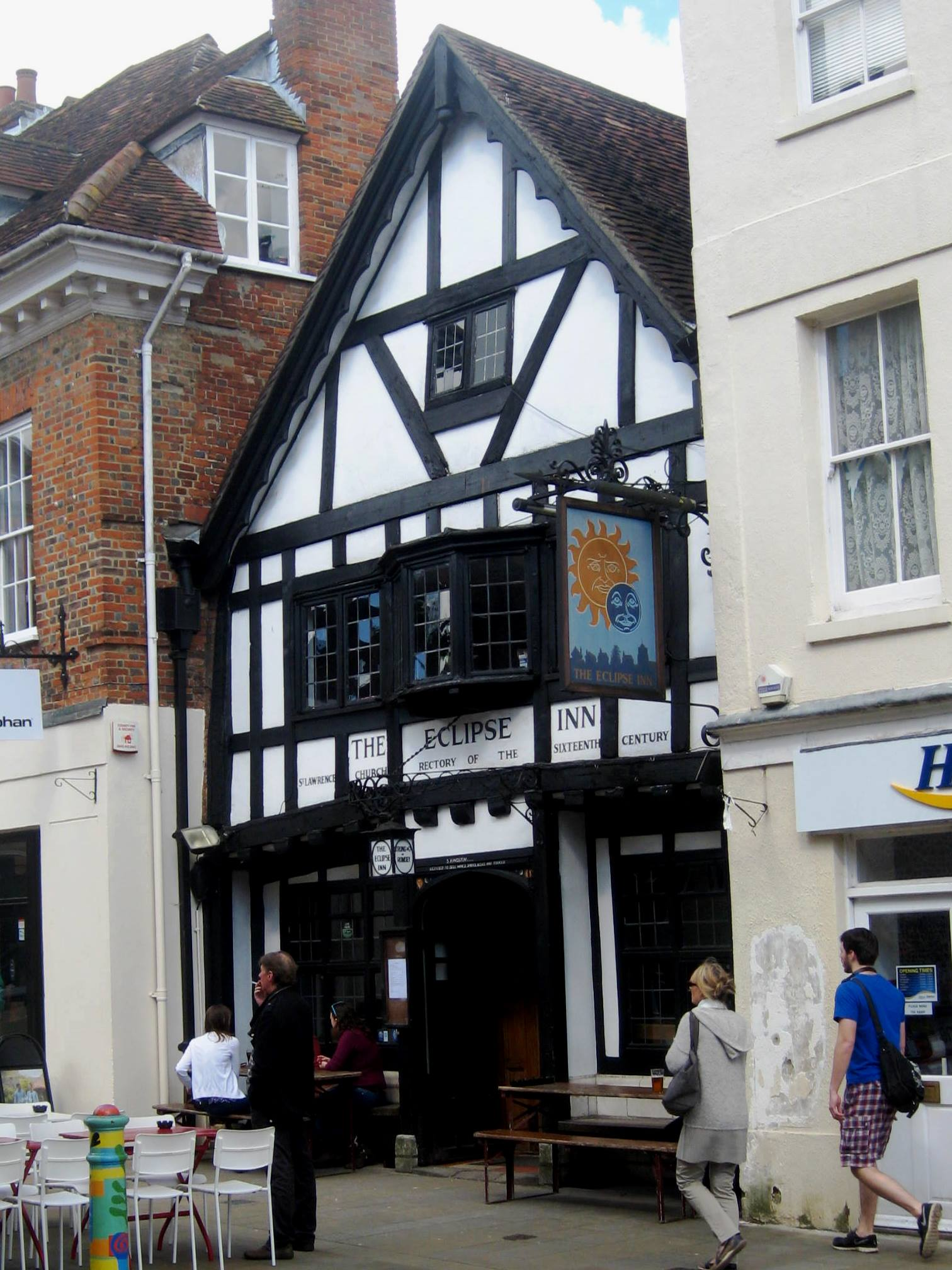
The Eclipse Inn, Winchester

Jeffreys respited the sentence for a week but James II refused to extend mercy to her, though he allowed beheading as befitted her social rank to be substituted for burning at the stake. Lady Lisle was publicly executed by an axe in Winchester marketplace on 2 September 1685; the last woman in English history to be beheaded by judicial sentence. She died with courage and dignity: onlookers remarked that, perhaps due to her age, she seemed to leave the world without regret (some other accounts, however, suggest she was as prone to napping during the procedure as she had been during her trial). She is buried in a tomb on the right-hand side of the porch at St Mary and All Saints Church, in Ellingham, Hampshire.

A plaque on the wall of the Winchester city museum marks the spot of Lady Lisle's execution, opposite The Eclipse Inn near the cathedral. She spent the night before her execution in one of the upper rooms of the inn, whence she exited via a window directly onto the scaffold erected for her beheading.

== Legacy ==
Many writers have described Lady Alice's execution as a judicial murder: Gilbert Burnet called her the first martyr of the Bloody Assizes. One of the first acts of the parliament of William and Mary after the Glorious Revolution was to reverse her attainder on the grounds that the prosecution was irregular and the verdict injuriously extorted by "the menaces and violences and other illegal practices" of Judge Jeffreys. In fact, Jeffreys seems to have followed the strict letter of the law of the time. His modern biographer concludes that justice was done according to the law, but that a wiser ruler than James II would have shown clemency to Lady Lisle.
