= Wheatfield, Oxfordshire =

Coordinates: 51.697°N 1.000°W

Wheatfield
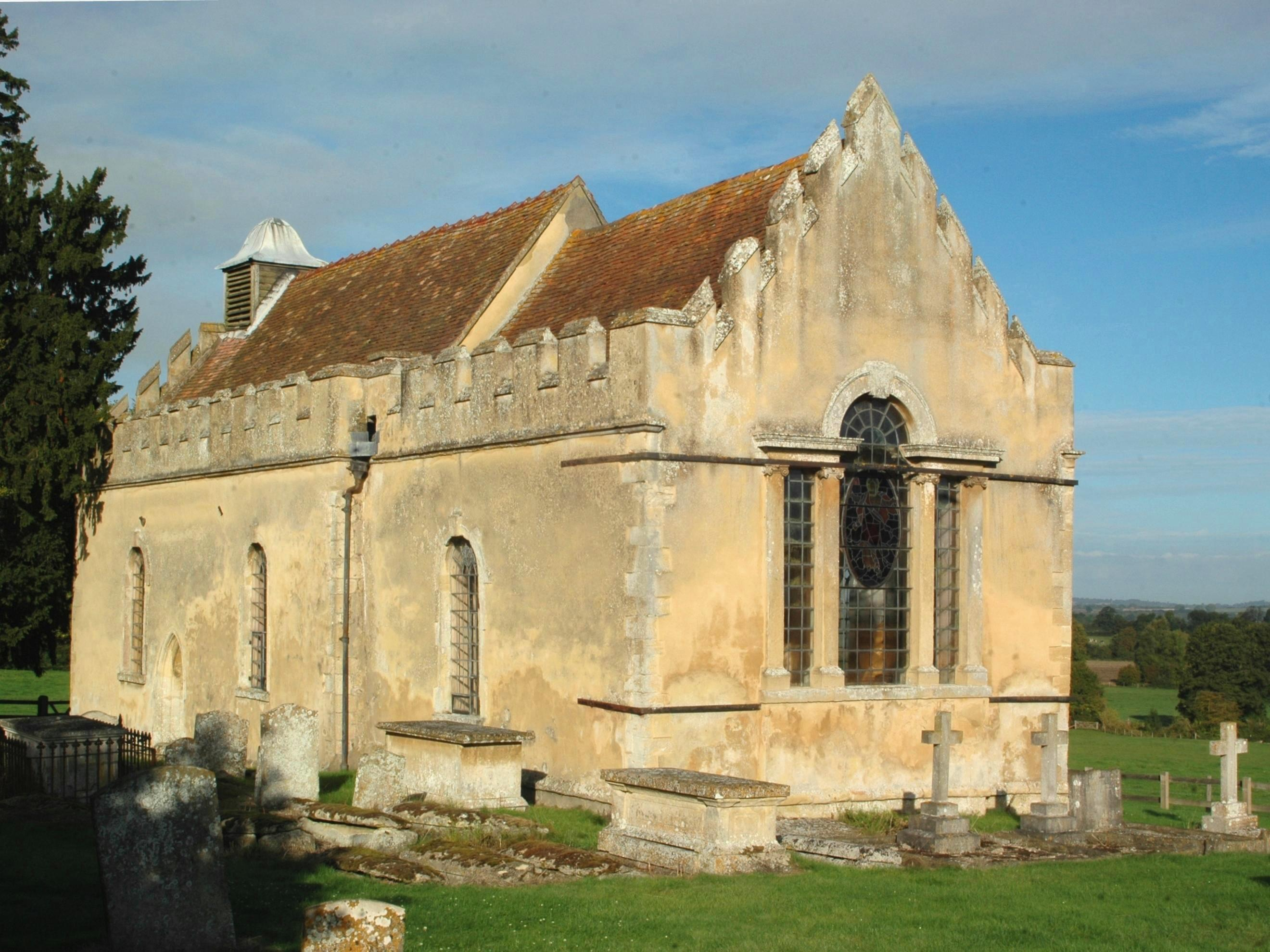
- St. Andrew's parish church

- Location within Oxfordshire
- Population: 22 (2001 census)
- OS grid reference: SU6899
- Civil parish: Wheatfield
- District: South Oxfordshire
- Shire county: Oxfordshire
- Region: South East
- Country: England
- Sovereign state: United Kingdom
- Post town: Thame
- Postcode district: OX9
- Dialling code: 01844
- Police: Thames Valley
- Fire: Oxfordshire
- Ambulance: South Central
- UK Parliament: Henley and Thame

Wheatfield is a civil parish and deserted medieval village about 4 miles (6.4 km) south of Thame in Oxfordshire. Wheatfield's toponym is derived from the Old English for "white field", referring to the ripe crops that the Anglo-Saxons grew on its fertile land. Few of Wheatfield's buildings remain today except the Church of England parish church of Saint Andrew, the former rectory and the former outbuildings of the no-longer-standing manor house.

== Manor ==
Wheatfield existed by 1086, when the Domesday Book records that Robert D'Oyly held the manor and it was assessed at two hides. By 1166, Wheatfield had become part of the Honour of Wallingford. The demesne tenant was one Peter, who also held one hide at Lewknor. Peter became the ancestor of the De Whitfield family, with whom Wheatfield manor remained until 1390 when Katherine, widow of John de Whitfield, died with no male heir. Their elder daughter, Joan de Whitfield, was married to Hugh, a younger son of the Streatley family of Creslow in Buckinghamshire. By this marriage half of Wheatfield passed to Hugh Streatley and his heirs. Their younger daughter, Elizabeth, inherited the other half and left it to her daughter Maud Barrow. The Barrow surname evolved to Abarrow, and the family lived at Charford, Hampshire. By 1505 the Streatleys rented the Abarrow half of Wheatfield as well as owning their own half.

In 1571, the Abarrows sold their half of Wheatfield and in 1576–77 Thomas Tipping bought both halves of Wheatfield and reunited the manor. William 'Eternity' Tipping (1599–1649), one of Thomas's younger grandsons, was born and baptised at Wheatfield. Later holders of the estate included the Civil War Parliamentarian Sir Thomas Tipping (1614–1693), and a later Sir Thomas Tipping (1653–1718), whom William III made a baronet in 1698. The Parliamentarian Sir Thomas suffered financial losses in the Civil War, which may be why he mortgaged some of his meadows in 1663. The first baronet died leaving considerable debts and the family's various estates heavily mortgaged, and when his son Sir Thomas Tipping, 2nd Baronet died in 1727 the estates were sold.

John Rudge, Member of Parliament for Evesham, bought Wheatfield, along with the Tipping estates of Worminghall in Buckinghamshire and Thomley near Waterperry. His purchases were funded by a bequest from his mother-in-law Susannah Letten, and when his son Edward Rudge died heirless in 1763 Wheatfield reverted to her heirs. The Lettens sold Wheatfield in 1769 to Lord Charles Spencer, second son of Charles Spencer, 3rd Duke of Marlborough. One 19th century heir, Charles Vere Spencer, became a "squarson" — simultaneously both lord of the manor and parson of the parish. Wheatfield was still in this branch of the Spencer family in the 1960s.

=== Manor house and Wheatfield Park ===
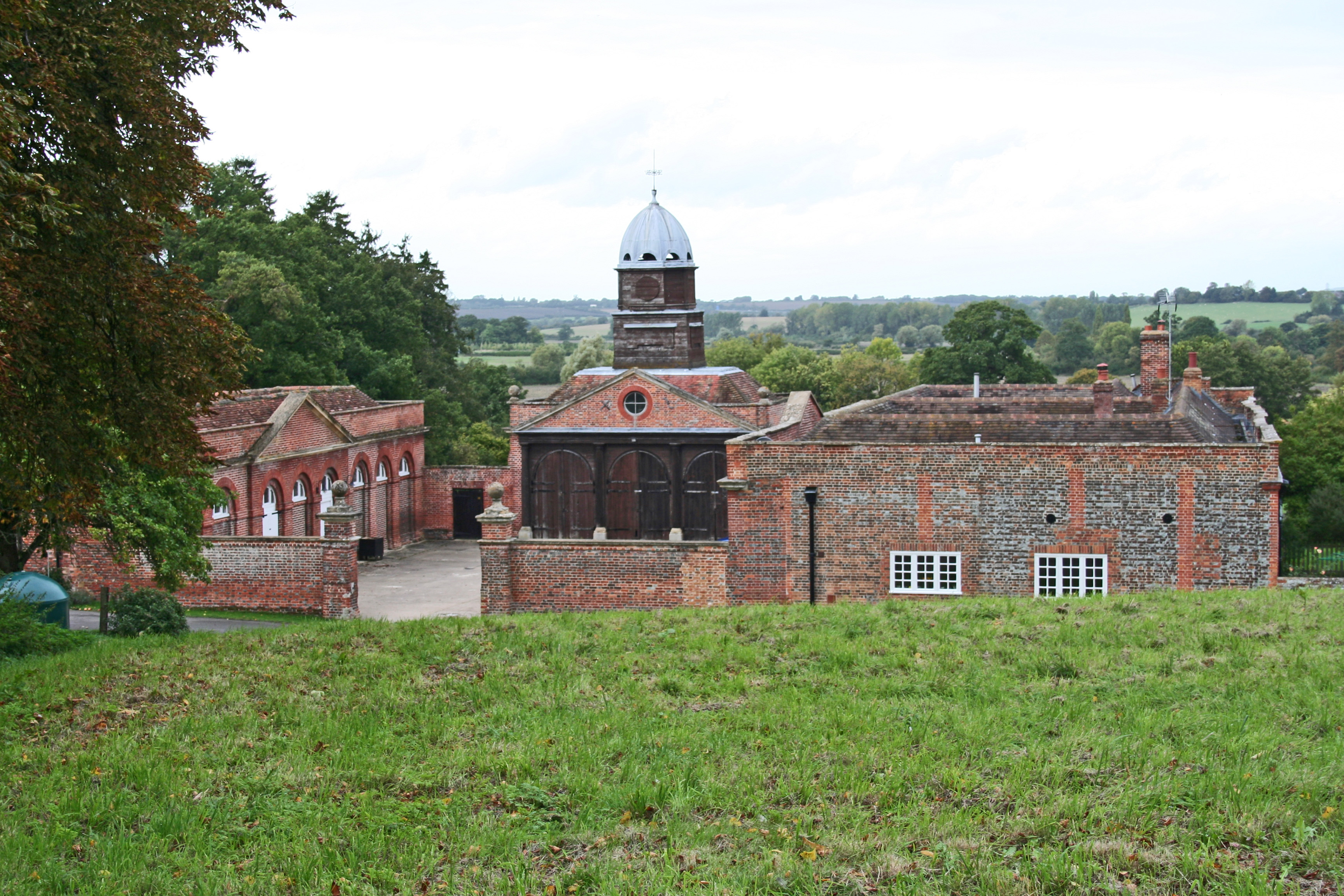
The surviving farm buildings

The Tippings had a manor house built in the late 16th or early 17th century. It stood just west of St. Andrew's church. In 1637 it had a great parlour, hall, great chamber, drawing chamber, five other principal chambers, buttery, beer cellar, wine cellar, nine other chambers, and "offices" including a bakehouse and a brewery. In 1662, the house was assessed for hearth tax as having 15 hearths. By 1700, the manor had a dovecote, a hop-garden surrounded by a canal, the house had a T-shaped plan and its surroundings included a flower garden, a fountain and a pond. The house was rebuilt in the 18th century, probably for John Rudge who moved to Wheatfield after he bought the manor in 1727. Rudge's new Georgian house was called Wheatfield Park. A drawing from about 1750 shows it as having five bays, with two storeys plus attic dormer windows. When his son Edward Rudge died in 1763 there was still a dovecote, and by then the stables had been built.

After Lord Charles Spencer completed the purchase of the manor in 1770, he seems to have had Wheatfield Park enlarged with the addition of a bow-fronted north wing. By 1787 there was an ornamental lake in front of the house. The house caught fire on New Year's Day 1814. Fire engines from Shirburn and Watlington fought the blaze, but were hampered by a severe frost that had frozen much of the available water. This was during the Napoleonic Wars, and French prisoners of war on parole from Thame came to help. Their French officer helped to organise the villagers to fight the fire, but when he proposed that half of the house could be saved by blowing up the other half, Lord Charles Spencer refused stating that he feared for the safety of the crowds of people and of St. Andrew's church. Wheatfield Park's stables, coach-house, farmhouse, an 18th-century barn and other farm outbuildings detached from the house escaped the fire. The coach house, stables and farmhouse form three sides of a courtyard, with a wall enclosing the fourth. They are now Grade II* listed buildings.

== Parish church ==
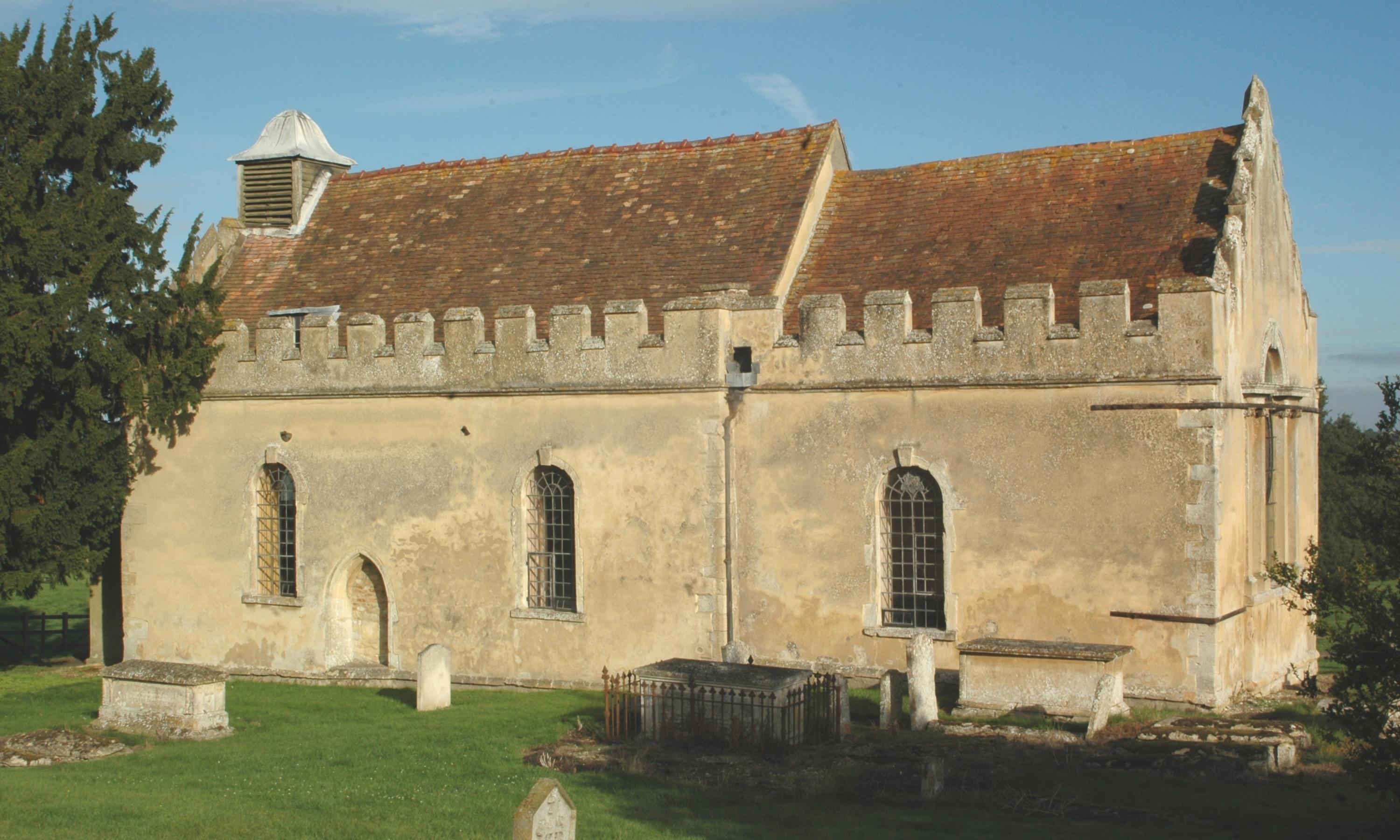
St. Andrew's parish church

Wheatfield had a church with a rector by 1202, although a document from 1240 or 1241 still refers to it as a chapel. The oldest features of the Church of England parish church of Saint Andrew are the chancel arch and a doorway on the south side of the nave, both of which are 14th century. There is a blocked Perpendicular Gothic window on the north side of the chancel. The king post roof is probably 17th century. John Rudge had St. Andrew's remodelled early in the 18th century, and this Georgian work obscures most Medieval features except those above. The church retains its Georgian features and fittings, including a Venetian east window and 18th century box pews. The wooden communion table is a high-quality carved piece from about 1745, that Sherwood and Pevsner considered similar to the work of John Vardy.

St. Andrew's contains several 17th and 18th century monuments to members of the successive manorial families, including one to John Rudge made in 1739 by the Flemish sculptor Peter Scheemakers. The chancel includes 14th century stained glass showing the arms of the Whitfield family and the west window of the nave has 18th century glass showing the arms of the Rudge, Letten and other families. The Venetian east window of the chancel has late Victorian stained glass by Morris & Co. St. Andrew's has no tower; only a bell-turret. It has one bell, which was cast in 1636 by Ellis I Knight of Reading, Berkshire. The church has no running water or electricity; its only lighting is from candles mounted on 18th century brackets. the church is a Grade I listed building. In 1729, John Rudge presented a set of church plate to St. Andrew's. In Lord Charles Spencer's time the set was kept in Wheatfield Park for security, but this led to its being destroyed in the 1814 fire. The present church plate is a replacement set that Lord Charles Spencer presented in 1814. Past rectors include Henry Taylor, who was incumbent 1737–46. St. Andrew's is now part of an extensive benefice with nine other parishes including those of Thame and Lewknor.

=== Former rectory, now Wheatfield House ===
In the 17th century Wheatfield had a substantial Rectory, assessed at six hearths in 1662 for the hearth tax. Adam Blandy, who was Rector 1709–22, had the house rebuilt. Frederick Charles Spencer became rector in 1820 and had Blandy's rectory remodelled and extended in 1823, adding the present Doric porch but retaining the Queen Anne style south front. In the 20th century the house ceased to be used as the Rectory and in 1928 it was sold to the lord of the manor, Lieutenant Colonel Aubrey Vere Spencer DSO, who renamed it Wheatfield House and made it the manor house.

== Economic and social history ==
Wheatfield was a successful arable farming community throughout the Middle Ages. By 1212 it had a watermill. The Hundred Rolls of 1279 record 18 virgates of arable land at Wheatfield, of which 12 belonged to the manor. There were meadow, pasture and glebe land in addition. Wheatfield supported at least 12 villeins and two freeholders well as the Lord of the Manor and the Rector. The community recovered well from the Black Death in the 14th century, such that in 1377 a parish population of 60 adults was recorded for taxation. In 1505 John Streatley, lord of the manor, enclosed 160 acres (65 ha) of arable land for pasture. This dispossessed seven messuages of their land and made 54 peasants workless and homeless. Taxation surveys in 1523 and 1577 indicate a significant fall in population. Having lost much of its arable land, Wheatfield had little use for its mill, and the last record of its existence dates from 1574. Not all of Wheatfield's open fields were enclosed, and a small peasant population remained. When the parish was surveyed for hearth tax in 1662 seven households were recorded besides the Manor House and the Rectory, and in 1685 eight people plus the lord and the rector signed the glebe terrier.

The 1801 Census recorded 89 inhabitants and the 1831 Census recorded 105. By 1841 the remaining open fields had been enclosed but Parliament passed an inclosure act for parts of South Weston, Stoke Talmage and Wheatfield in 1854. After peaking around 1831 the population fell again; the 1901 Census recorded 72, an estimate in 1960 gave a population of 40 and the 2001 Census recorded only 22 inhabitants. With such a small population, Wheatfield had relatively few children to support a school. In 1784, poor children in Wheatfield were reported to be "schooled by a weekly donation". A Sunday school was started in 1790, restarted in 1824 and the last known record of it is from 1878. A dame school was opened in 1824, and by 1833 it had four boys and seven girls as pupils. By 1854 the school had only six pupils and there is no known record of it thereafter. Wheatfield families thereafter relied on neighbouring parishes including Lewknor and Stoke Talmage to educate their children. In 1956 Wheatfield children were schooled in Tetsworth but in 1960 they were transferred to Watlington.

== Demography ==
The 2011 Census incorporated its figures into an output area accordingly used to enlarge the civil parish definition of Shirburn to the south, incorporating too Adwell and Stoke Talmage due to their small population.

== Sources ==
- Lobel, Mary D, ed. (1969). A History of the County of Oxford: Volume 8: Lewknor and Pyrton Hundreds. Victoria County History. pp. 263–273.
- Sherwood, Jennifer; Pevsner, Nikolaus (1974). Oxfordshire. The Buildings of England. Harmondsworth: Penguin Books. pp. 836–837. ISBN 0-14-071045-0.
