= William 'Eternity' Tipping =

English religious writer

William Tipping (1599–1649) was an early 17th-century English religious writer.

== Life ==
William Tipping was the fourth son of Sir George Tipping (1560–1627) of Wheatfield, Oxfordshire by his wife, Dorothy (1564–1637), daughter of Sir John Borlase of Little Marlow, Buckinghamshire. He was the uncle of Sir Thomas Tipping the Elder. Tipping attended Queen's College, Oxford and entered Lincoln's Inn but did not become a lawyer. He returned to the Manor of Draycot, Oxfordshire to pursue a scholarly life. He married, about 1627, to Ursula, daughter of Sir Edward Brett of Edmonton, Middlesex, and together they had two sons and two daughters.

Tipping died in Waterstock, Oxfordshire on 2 February 1649 and is buried in the church there.

== Works ==
In 1633 Tipping published A Discourse of Eternitie which earned him the nickname of Eternity Tipping. He subsequently appeared before the court of high commission several times on charges of puritan practice. A Return of Thankfulness (1640) and the Calvinist Father's Counsell (1643) followed. Then The Preachers Plea (1646) and The Remarkable Life and Death of the Lady Apollina Hall (1647).

== US descendants? ==
It is often erroneously stated that two of Tipping's children, William and Dorothy, emigrated to Talbot County, Maryland in 1664. However, William Tipping Junior lived all his life in London. He married and had a family of six children in Westminster, including Rev Dr Ichabod Tipping, the Vicar of Camberwell. He died in Smithfield in February 1709.
