= South Gorley =

Hamlet in Hampshire, England

Coordinates: 50.8865°N 1.7720°W

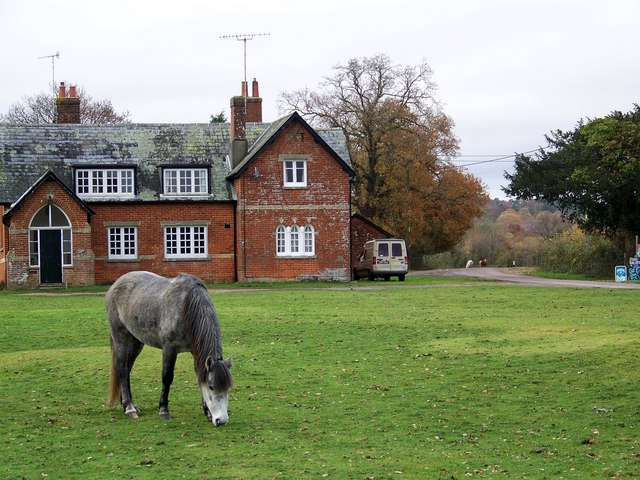
- Old school house at South Gorley

- Location within Hampshire
- OS grid reference: SU161097
- Civil parish: Ellingham, Harbridge and Ibsley
- District: New Forest
- Shire county: Hampshire
- Region: South East
- Country: England
- Sovereign state: United Kingdom
- Post town: RINGWOOD
- Postcode district: BH24
- Dialling code: 01590
- Police: Hampshire and Isle of Wight
- Fire: Hampshire and Isle of Wight
- Ambulance: South Central
- UK Parliament: New Forest West

South Gorley is a hamlet in the New Forest National Park of Hampshire, England. It is in the civil parish of Ellingham, Harbridge and Ibsley. Its nearest town is Ringwood, which lies approximately 3 miles (4.8 km) south-west of the hamlet.

The hamlet sits on the western boundary of the New Forest National Park, about 0.5 miles (0.80 km) south of North Gorley. The River Avon lies just to the west.

== History ==
The name Gorley means "triangular wood/clearing". In 1086 Osbern the Falconer held the manor of Gorley from the King. The part which became South Gorley was for most of its history included in and followed the descent of Ibsley, in particular that part of Ibsley which John atte Bere had owned in the 14th century. South Gorley was, unlike North Gorley, in the parish of Ibsley, and it is now part of the civil parish of Ellingham, Harbridge and Ibsley. The old village school of Ibsley, built in 1874 by the Earl of Normanton, was at South Gorley.

In 1902 the artist Heywood Sumner acquired a plot land at Cuckoo Hill near South Gorley. He designed and built a house there where he lived from 1904 until his death in 1940 at the age of 87. The house is now a care home.
