= Thomas Tipping (knight) =

English civil war soldier

- Born: 1614
- Died: 1 March 1693 (aged 78–79)
- Burial place: Wheatfield, Oxfordshire, England
- Children: 16, including Sir Thomas Tipping, 1st Baronet
- Relatives: Christopher Pigott (Maternal grandfather); William 'Eternity' Tipping (uncle); John Lisle (Brother-in-law)

Sir Thomas Tipping (1614–1 March 1693) was a prominent Parliamentarian during the English Civil War.

== Family ==
Sir Thomas was the eldest son of John Tipping of Wheatfield, Oxfordshire and his wife, Anne daughter of Sir Christopher Pigott of Doddershall in Buckinghamshire. He was baptised in Wheatfield parish church on 10 December 1615, but his father died when he was only four years old. In 1627, Tipping inherited the Wheatfield estate upon the death of his grandfather, Sir George Tipping. Four years later, he matriculated from Trinity College, Oxford at the age of fifteen. He married, in 1637, Elizabeth (1620–1698) youngest daughter and co-heiress of Sir White Beconshaw of Moyles Court at Ellingham, Hampshire, by whom he had five sons and eleven daughters, only eight of whom survived him.

== Career ==
From 1647, Tipping served on various local Oxfordshire commissions. Although sometimes referred to as a Royalist who walked a tightrope during the Civil War, Tipping, in fact, appears to have been something of a Parliamentarian like his more outspoken uncle, the Puritan and Parliamentarian writer, William 'Eternity' Tipping. Thomas was the brother-in-law of the regicide, Sir John Lisle, and a friend of the Commonwealth Lord Keeper of the Great Seal, Sir Bulstrode Whitelocke, whose visits to Wheatfield are recorded in his diary. However, upon the Restoration, he embraced reconciliation and Charles II created him a Knight Bachelor at Whitehall Palace on 15 June 1660. To commemorate this event portraits were painted of Sir Thomas and Lady Tipping by Gilbert Soest. Both, for many years, hung in Bramshill House in Hampshire, home of their descendants, the Cope family. The former is now in the Tate Gallery. The whereabouts of the latter are unknown.

Sir Thomas died on 1 March 1693, aged 78, and was buried at Wheatfield. He was succeeded in his estates by his second son, Sir Thomas Tipping, 1st Baronet.

== Sources ==
- Lobel, Mary D, ed. (1969). A History of the County of Oxford: Volume 8: Lewknor and Pyrton Hundreds. Victoria County History. pp. 263–273.
