= New Forest West =

UK Parliament constituency (since 1997)

Coordinates: 50.806°N 1.629°W

- County constituency for the House of Commons
- Boundaries since 2010
- Boundary of New Forest West in South East England
- County: Hampshire
- Electorate: 71,009 (2023)
- Major settlements: Fordingbridge; Ringwood; New Milton; Lymington

Current constituency
- Created: 1997
- Member of Parliament: Desmond Swayne (Conservative)
- Seats: One
- Created from: New Forest

New Forest West is a constituency (Note: A county constituency (for the purposes of election expenses and type of returning officer)) represented in the House of Commons of the UK Parliament since 1997 by Desmond Swayne, a Conservative. (Note: As with all constituencies, the constituency elects one Member of Parliament (MP) by the first past the post system of election at least every five years.)

== Constituency profile ==
New Forest West is a constituency in Hampshire. Most of its population lives in coastal settlements in the south, and much of the inland area is part of the New Forest National Park. Its largest town is New Milton, which, together with the connected villages of Ashley and Barton on Sea, has a population of around 25,000. Other settlements in the constituency include the towns of Lymington, Ringwood and Fordingbridge and the villages of Milford on Sea, Hordle and Bransgore.

New Milton is a historic market town that grew significantly during the late 19th and early 20th centuries after the construction of a railway station, and is today a popular retirement location. Lymington is a port town with a history of shipbuilding and yachting. Ringwood and Fordingbridge are traditional market towns and, like the rest of the constituency, are generally affluent. House prices across the constituency are higher than the national and South East England averages.

New Forest West has a very large retiree population; around 35% of residents are over the age of 65, nearly double the overall England and Wales percentage. Residents have average levels of education, are more likely to be religious, and have high rates of homeownership compared to the rest of the country. Household income levels are average and the child poverty rate is low. A high proportion of residents work in the retail and tourism sectors, and the percentage claiming unemployment benefits is low. White people made up 97% of the population at the 2021 census.

At the local council level, most of the constituency is represented by Conservatives with some Green Party and Liberal Democrat councillors elected in the inland areas and some Reform UK representatives elected at the county council. An estimated 57% of voters in New Forest West supported leaving the European Union in the 2016 referendum, higher than the nationwide figure of 52%.

== Boundaries ==
1997–2010: The District of New Forest wards of Barton, Bashley, Becton, Bransgore and Sopley, Downlands, Fordingbridge, Forest North West, Forest West, Hordle, Lymington Town, Milford, Milton, Pennington, Ringwood North, Ringwood South, and Sway.

2010–2023: The District of New Forest wards of Barton, Bashley, Becton, Bransgore and Burley, Buckland, Downlands and Forest, Fernhill, Fordingbridge, Forest North West, Hordle, Lymington Town, Milford, Milton, Pennington, Ringwood East and Sopley, Ringwood North, and Ringwood South.

2023–present: Following a review of local authority ward boundaries, which became effective in May 2023, the constituency now comprises the following:

- The District of New Forest wards of: Ashley, Bashley and Fernhill; Ballard; Barton and Becton; Bransgore, Burley, Sopley & Ringwood East; Downlands and Forest North; Fordingbridge, Godshill & Hyde; Lymington; Milford and Hordle; Milton; Pennington; Ringwood North and Ellingham; and Ringwood South.

The 2023 Periodic Review of Westminster constituencies, which was based on the ward structure in place at 1 December 2020, left the boundaries unchanged.

== History ==
This constituency was created when the old New Forest constituency was divided for the 1997 general election. Since its creation, election results suggest a Conservative safe seat.

== Members of Parliament ==
New Forest prior to 1997

Election	Member	Party
1997	Sir Desmond Swayne	Conservative

== Elections ==
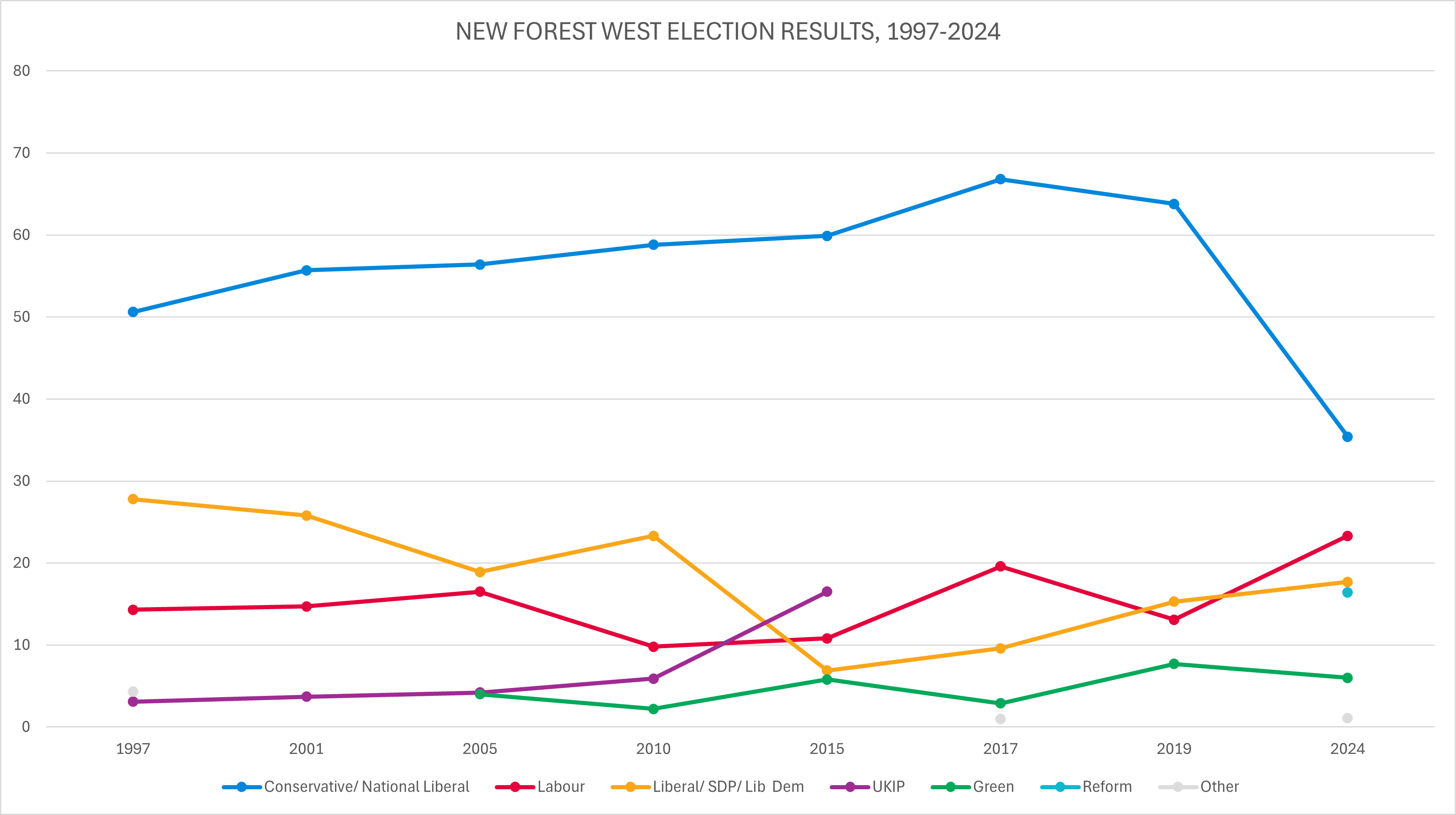
Election results 1950-2024

=== Elections in the 2020s ===
General election 2024: New Forest West
Party	Candidate	Votes	%	±%
Conservative	Desmond Swayne	16,412	35.4	−28.4
Labour	Sally Johnston	10,812	23.3	+10.2
Liberal Democrats	Jack Davies	8,186	17.7	+2.4
Reform	Reginald Chester-Sterne	7,577	16.4	New
Green	Anna Collar	2,800	6.0	−1.7
Animal Welfare	Gavin Ridley	393	0.8	New
SDP	Paul Simon	157	0.3	New
Majority		5,600	12.1	−36.4
Turnout		46,337	67.5	−3.3
Registered electors		68,644		
Conservative hold		Swing	−19.3	

=== Elections in the 2010s ===
General election 2019: New Forest West
Party	Candidate	Votes	%	±%
Conservative	Desmond Swayne	32,113	63.8	−3.0
Liberal Democrats	Jack Davies	7,710	15.3	+5.7
Labour	Jo Graham	6,595	13.1	−6.5
Green	Nicholas Bubb	3,888	7.7	+4.8
Majority		24,403	48.5	+1.3
Turnout		50,306	71.3	−1.5
Conservative hold		Swing	−4.35	

General election 2017: New Forest West
Party	Candidate	Votes	%	±%
Conservative	Desmond Swayne	33,170	66.8	+6.9
Labour	Jo Graham	9,739	19.6	+8.8
Liberal Democrats	Terry Scriven	4,781	9.6	+2.7
Green	Janet Richards	1,454	2.9	−2.9
Pirate	Des Hjerling	483	1.0	New
Majority		23,431	47.2	+3.8
Turnout		49,627	72.8	+3.6
Conservative hold		Swing	−0.95	

General election 2015: New Forest West
Party	Candidate	Votes	%	±%
Conservative	Desmond Swayne	28,420	59.9	+1.1
UKIP	Paul Bailey	7,816	16.5	+10.6
Labour	Lena Samuels	5,133	10.8	+1.0
Liberal Democrats	Imogen Shepherd-DuBey	3,293	6.9	−16.4
Green	Janet Richards	2,748	5.8	+3.6
Majority		20,604	43.4	+7.9
Turnout		47,410	69.2	−7.4
Conservative hold		Swing	−4.75	

General election 2010: New Forest West
Party	Candidate	Votes	%	±%
Conservative	Desmond Swayne	27,980	58.8	+2.9
Liberal Democrats	Mike Plummer	11,084	23.3	+4.1
Labour	Janice Hurne	4,666	9.8	−6.7
UKIP	Martin Lyon	2,783	5.9	+1.7
Green	Janet Richards	1,059	2.2	−1.8
Majority		16,896	35.5	−1.2
Turnout		47,572	69.6	+3.5
Conservative hold		Swing	−0.6	

=== Elections in the 2000s ===
General election 2005: New Forest West
Party	Candidate	Votes	%	±%
Conservative	Desmond Swayne	26,004	56.4	+0.7
Liberal Democrats	Murari Kaushik	8,719	18.9	−6.9
Labour	Janice Hurne	7,590	16.5	+1.8
UKIP	Brian Lawrence	1,917	4.2	+0.5
Green	Janet Richards	1,837	4.0	New
Majority		17,285	37.5	+7.6
Turnout		46,067	66.5	+1.5
Conservative hold		Swing	+3.8	

General election 2001: New Forest West
Party	Candidate	Votes	%	±%
Conservative	Desmond Swayne	24,575	55.7	+5.1
Liberal Democrats	Michael Bignell	11,384	25.8	−2.0
Labour	Crada N. Onuegbu	6,481	14.7	+0.4
UKIP	Michael Clark	1,647	3.7	+0.6
Majority		13,191	29.9	+7.1
Turnout		44,087	65.0	−9.7
Conservative hold		Swing	+3.6	

=== Elections in the 1990s ===
General election 1997: New Forest West
Party	Candidate	Votes	%	±%
Conservative	Desmond Swayne	25,149	50.6	
Liberal Democrats	Robert C.H. Hale	13,817	27.8	
Labour	David R. Griffiths	7,092	14.3	
Referendum	Maureen A. Elliott	2,150	4.3	
UKIP	Michael Holmes	1,542	3.1	
Majority		11,332	22.8	
Turnout		49,750	74.7	
Conservative win (new seat)				

== See also ==
- List of parliamentary constituencies in Hampshire
- List of parliamentary constituencies in the South East England (region)

== Sources ==
- Election result, 2005 (BBC)
- Election results, 1997 - 2001 (BBC)
- Election results, 1997 - 2001 (Election Demon)
- Election results, 1997 - 2005 (Guardian)
