= Sherborne =

Market town and civil parish in Dorset, England

Coordinates: 50.9469°N 2.5171°W

- Market town and civil parish
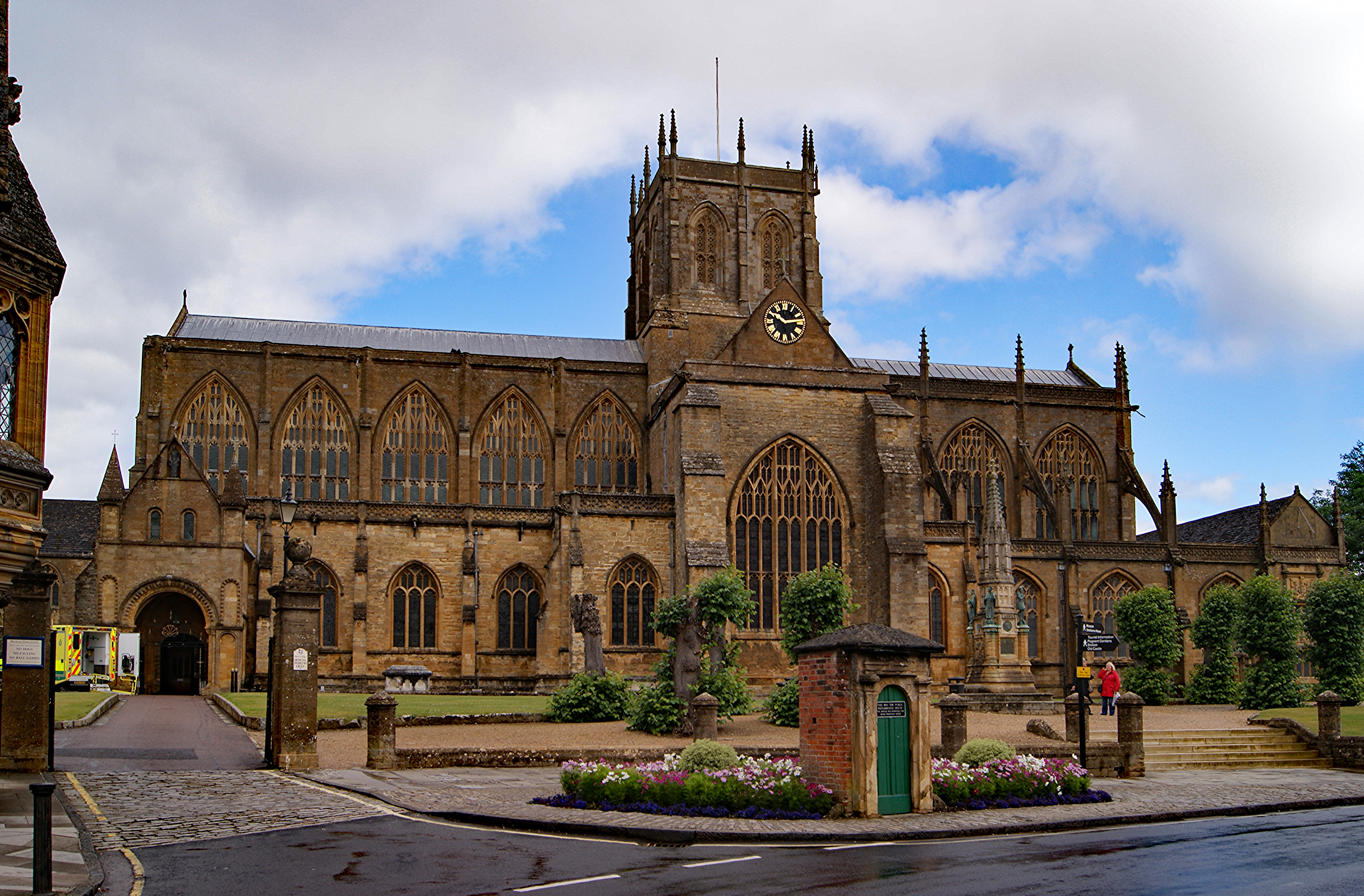
- Sherborne Abbey

- Location within Dorset
- Interactive map showing the parish boundary
- Population: 10,361 (2021 census)
- OS grid reference: ST638165
  - London: 124 mi (200 km)
- Unitary authority: Dorset
- Ceremonial county: Dorset
- Region: South West
- Country: England
- Sovereign state: United Kingdom
- Post town: Sherborne
- Postcode district: DT9
- Dialling code: 01935
- Police: Dorset
- Fire: Dorset and Wiltshire
- Ambulance: South Western
- UK Parliament: West Dorset

Sherborne is a market town and civil parish in north-west Dorset, England. It is sited on the River Yeo, on the edge of the Blackmore Vale, 6 miles (9.7 km) east of Yeovil. The parish includes the hamlets of Nether Coombe and Lower Clatcombe. The A30 road, which connects London with Penzance, runs through the town. In the 2021 census the population of Sherborne was 10,361.

Sherborne's historic buildings include Sherborne Abbey, independent schools, its manor house and two castles: the ruins of a 12th-century fortified palace and the 16th-century mansion known as Sherborne Castle built by Sir Walter Raleigh. Much of the old town, including much of the abbey and many medieval and Georgian buildings, is built from distinctive honey-brown coloured Sherborne Stone.

== Toponymy ==
The town was named scir burne by the Saxon inhabitants, a name meaning "clear stream", after a brook that runs through the centre of the town, and is referred to as such in the Domesday Book.

== History ==
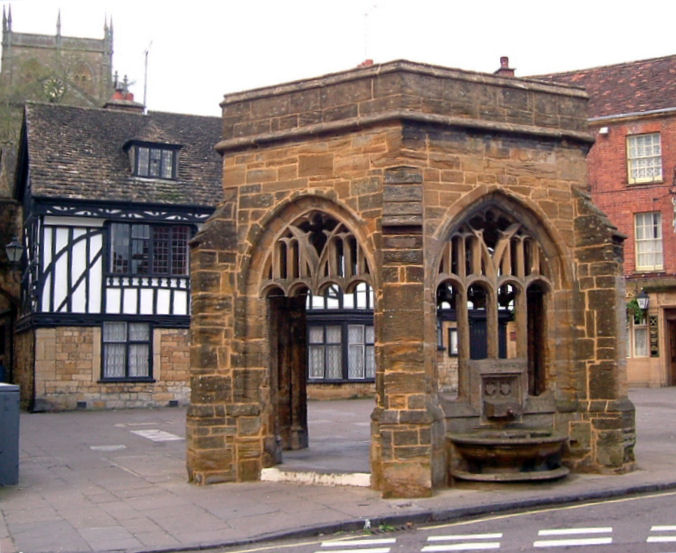
The Conduit

In 705, the diocese of Wessex was split between Sherborne and Winchester, and King Ine founded an abbey for St Aldhelm, the first Bishop of Sherborne, which covered Dorset, Somerset, and Devon. King Alfred the Great's elder brothers, King Æthelbald and King Æthelberht, are buried in the abbey. The large Sherborne diocese lasted until about 909 when it was further sub-divided into three sees, with Sherborne covering Dorset. In 933, King Æthelstan granted land at Sherborne to the nuns of Shaftesbury Abbey under the condition that they would recite the Psalter once a year on All Saints' day and say prayers for the king.

In 1075, the bishop's seat was moved to Old Sarum and the church at Sherborne became a Benedictine monastery. In 1437, the Abbey was damaged by fire after tensions between the town and the monastery came to a head, but much of the Norman structure stands today. Following the Dissolution of the Monasteries, in 1539, the vacated monastery buildings were bought by Sir John Horsey and became the parish church. Sherborne was the centre of Sherborne Hundred for many centuries.

In the 12th century, Roger de Caen, Bishop of Salisbury and Chancellor of England, built a fortified palace in Sherborne. During the English Civil War, it was besieged by Sir Thomas Fairfax in 1645, then slighted and left in ruins. Its ruins are now owned by English Heritage.

In 1594, Sir Walter Raleigh built an Elizabethan mansion in the grounds of the old palace, today known as Sherborne Castle.

Sherborne became home to Yorkshireman Captain Christopher Levett, who came to the West Country as His Majesty's Woodward of Somersetshire, and who remained in Sherborne when he turned to a career as a naval captain and early explorer of New England.

== Governance ==
In the UK national parliament, Sherborne is within the West Dorset parliamentary constituency. As of 2024, the MP is Edward Morello of the Liberal Democrats.

In local government, Sherborne is in the Dorset unitary authority at the highest tier. Sherborne elects 2 members to Dorset Council from two electoral wards, Sherborne East and Sherborne West. A third electoral ward, Sherborne Rural, contains the rural hinterland and surrounding villages, but none of Sherborne parish itself.

At the lower tier of local government, Sherborne is a civil parish with a 12-member parish council, which styles itself as Sherborne Town Council.

Coat of arms of Arms of Sherborne Town Council
| Notes Registered 1986 Crest Out of an Ancient Crown Or a double headed and twin-tailed Wyvern displayed Argent armed and langued Gules. Torse Argent and Azure Escutcheon Azure a Cross triparted and fretted Argent between four Double Roses Gules on Argent en soliel barbed and seeded Gold. Supporters On either side a Griffin segreant reguardant the aquiline parts Argent beaked and gorged with an Ancient Crown Or the leonine parts also Or armed and langued Gules. Motto Soli Deo Honor Et Gloria (To God Alone Be Honour And Glory) Badge A Crozier Or enfiling a Tower with a portal Argent. |

Historically, Sherborne was in Sherborne Hundred and became a borough in 1227. It was an urban district from 1894 to 1974. A separate rural district council, Sherborne Rural District, administered the surrounding parishes during this period, but did not include the town itself. From 1974 to 2019, following implementation of the Local Government Act 1972, Sherborne was in West Dorset district.

== Demographics ==
At the 2021 census, the following statistics were recorded for the Sherborne parish:

- It had a population of 10,361 people in 4,694 households (Note: The mid-year population estimate was 10,933.)
- 3,821 residents were aged 16 and over and in employment; 44.5% were in high skill occupations and 16.8% in low skill occupations
- 92% of the population identified as white British and 8% as black and minority ethnic. Just over half of the population identified as Christian, while just over one third had no religion.
- 28.7% of the population was aged 65 or older; the town's mean age was 45.1, compared to England's 39.3. By 2024, the proportion aged 65 or older was estimated to be 33.3%, higher than it is in Dorset (30.5%), and in England and Wales as a whole (18.9%).

Census population of Sherborne parish
| Census | Population | Female | Male | Households | Source |
|---|---|---|---|---|---|
| 1801 | 3,159 | 1,778 | 1,381 | | |
| 1811 | 3,370 | 1,939 | 1,431 | | |
| 1821 | 3,622 | 2,062 | 1,560 | | |
| 1831 | 4,075 | 2,266 | 1,809 | | |
| 1841 | 4,758 | 2,594 | 2,164 | | |
| 1851 | 5,242 | 2,811 | 2,431 | | |
| 1861 | | | | | |
| 1871 | | | | | |
| 1881 | 5,636 | 2,922 | 2,714 | | |
| 1891 | 5,690 | 3,058 | 2,632 | | |
| 1901 | 5,760 | 3,091 | 2,669 | | |
| 1911 | 5,953 | 3,299 | 2,654 | | |
| 1921 | 6,396 | 3,574 | 2,822 | | |
| 1931 | 6,542 | 3,541 | 3,001 | | |
| 1951 | 5,987 | 3,237 | 2,750 | | |
| 1961 | 6,053 | 3,195 | 2,858 | | |
| 1971 | 7,270 | | | | |
| 1981 | 7,570 | | | | |
| 1991 | 8,740 | | | | |
| 2001 | 9,350 | 4,947 | 4,403 | 3,934 | |
| 2011 | 9,523 | 5,024 | 4,499 | 4,213 | |
| 2021 | 10,361 | 5,551 | 4,810 | 4,694 | |

== Education ==
There has been a school in Sherborne since the time of King Alfred, who was educated there. The school was refounded in 1550, as King Edward's Grammar School, using some of the old abbey buildings; an independent school, it is now known simply as Sherborne School. Alumni include Cecil Day-Lewis, Alan Turing, Jeremy Irons, Chris Martin, John le Carré, Hugh Bonneville and John Cowper Powys. Sherborne School operates Sherborne International, a school which seeks to integrate international students into the British public school tradition.

There were also two grammar schools: Foster's School for Boys, founded in 1640, and Lord Digby's School for Girls, founded in 1743. In 1992, both schools merged with St Aldhelms to form The Gryphon School. Its alumni include politician Chris Loder, author Sophie Irwin and professional rugby player Ollie Devoto.

The town has two primary schools: Sherborne Abbey Primary School and Sherborne Primary School.

Sherborne School for Girls, often simply known as Sherborne Girls, was founded in 1895. Its notable alumnae include the opera singer Emma Kirkby and the scientist Rosa Beddington.

Sherborne Preparatory School is located opposite Sherborne School.

Nearby Leweston School was founded as St Anthony's in 1891 by the Sisters of Christian Instruction, Sacred Heart nuns from Belgium with Jesuit principles, who originally operated a full boarding school for girls in Sherborne town. The senior school moved to the Leweston Manor estate in 1948 and became known as St Antony's-Leweston. It transitioned from a girls-only school to fully co-educational from 2018 to 2021. Notable alumnae include businesswoman and Conservative life peer Dido Harding, Baroness Harding of Winscombe, and actor sisters Kristen and Serena Scott Thomas.

== Transport ==
The town is served by Sherborne railway station, which lies on the West of England Main Line. South Western Railway operates services between London Waterloo and Exeter St Davids, via Salisbury.

The Buses of Somerset and South West Coaches operate bus routes in the area, which link the town with Blandford Forum, Dorchester, Wincanton and Yeovil.

== Historic buildings ==
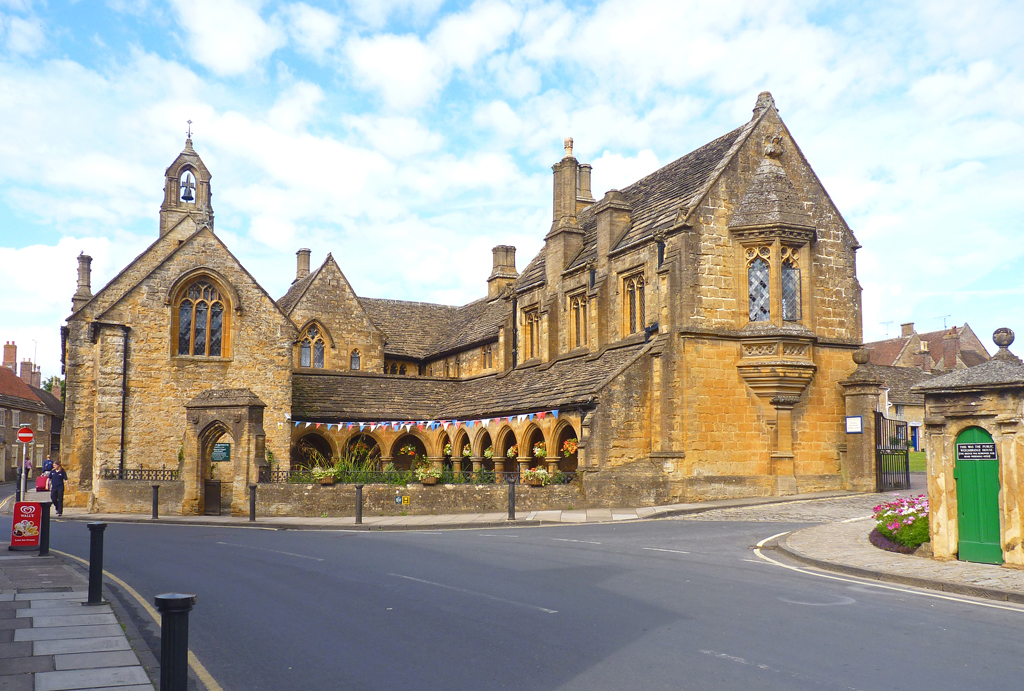
St Johns' House

There are 378 listed buildings within the town and a further 23 in Castleton parish (the rural parish which almost surrounds the town); these include 14 grade I listed buildings and 21 grade II* listed buildings.

An almshouse dedicated to John the Baptist and John the Evangelist, St Johns' House, was founded in 1437 and building completed in 1448. It was expanded in 1866 in indistinguishable medieval architecture, and continues to be a residential institution to the present day.

The Abbey Gatehouse, once the east gatehouse to the former Benedictine monastery. Following the dissolution of the monasteries, the building was sold off and used for secular purposes. Since 1966, it has been occupied by Sherborne Museum.

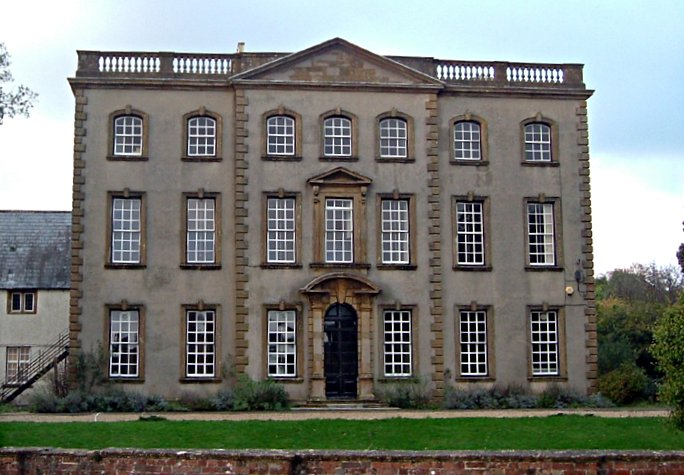
Sherborne House

Lord Digby school, now known as Sherborne House, was designed by Benjamin Bastard. Famed for its mural by Sir James Thornhill, it was a subject for the BBC's Restoration programme in 2004.

Other notable historic buildings in the town include the 1405 Hospice of St Julian; no. 101 Newland, built in 1297; and St Emerenciana's Chapel (now Nethercoombe Farm), built in the late 14th century and the only building in the country to have been dedicated to this saint. Also listed is the Conduit, originally built in the Abbey Cloister in 1520 as the monks' wash place before it was moved to the market place in 1560.

== Churches ==
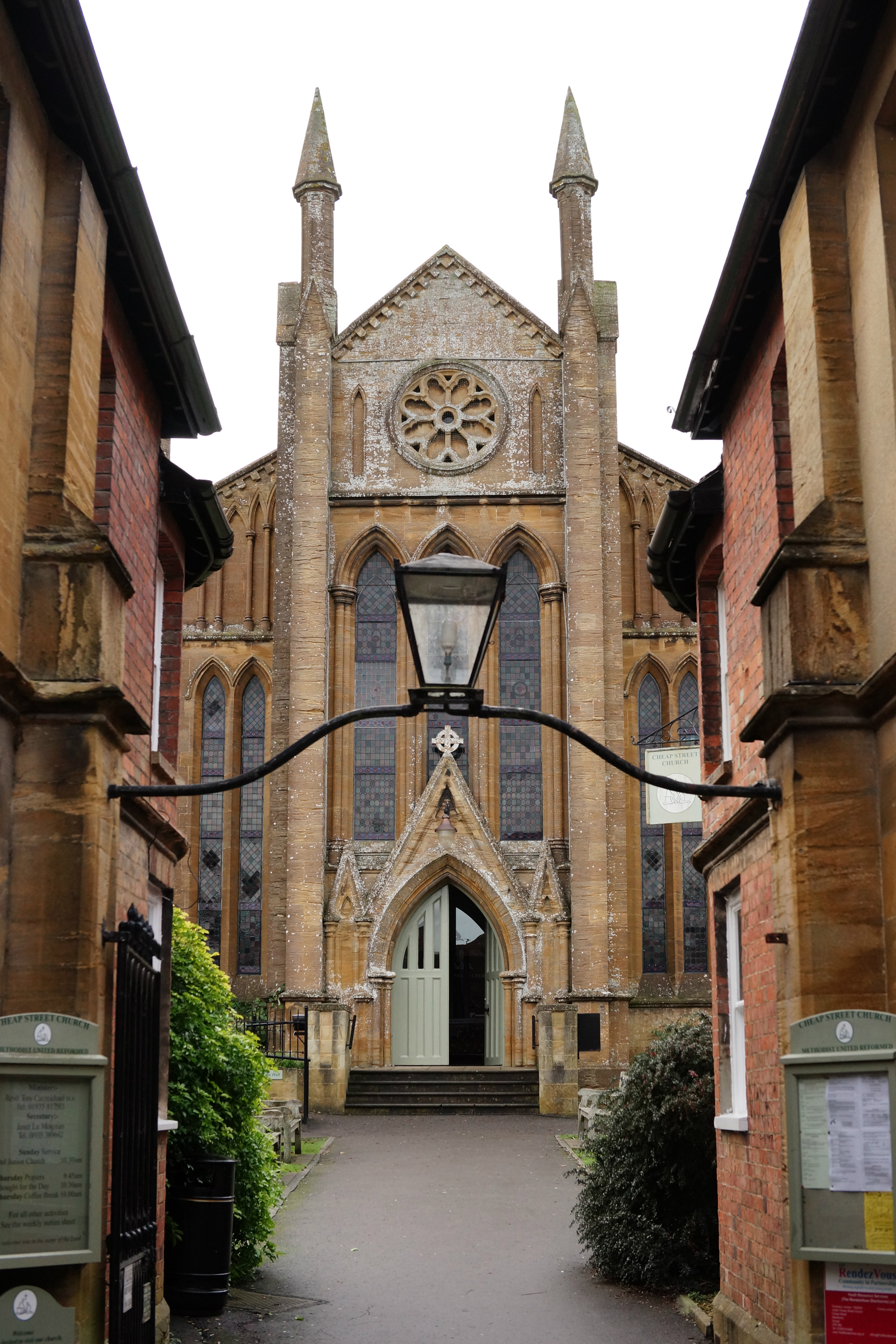
United Reformed and Methodist Church, viewed from Cheap Street

The Church of England parish church – Sherborne Abbey – is the most prominent building in the town. St Paul's Church is another Church of England church, in the north-east of the town. The Bishop of Sherborne is a suffragan bishop in the Diocese of Salisbury.

There is a Catholic church – the Church of The Sacred Heart and St Aldhelm – located on Westbury.

Cheap Street Church is a joint Methodist and United Reformed congregation. Originally a Methodist church, it was built in stages through the mid-late 19th century and is grade II listed.

== Environment and community ==
Sherborne has an active green community, with various environmental and sustainability organisations in the area. The Quarr Local Nature Reserve at the northern end of the town makes use of an old quarry and landfill site, Sherborne Area Partnership oversees a successful environment forum and, in 2009, Sherborne became a transition town, running a number of projects and events as a community response to climate change and peak oil. Sherborne Repair Café meets once a month.

== Pack Monday Fair ==
For centuries, the town has hosted an annual street fair, Pack Monday Fair; it starts on the Monday following 10 October (Old Michaelmas Day). Originally an agricultural fair, it is now devoted to stalls, sideshows and a funfair.

== Media ==
The local radio station is Abbey104, a community-based radio station that broadcasts to the town and surrounding areas in Dorset and Somerset.

The town’s local newspapers are the Sherborne Times and Dorset Echo.

== Sport and leisure ==
Sherborne has:

- A non-League football club, Sherborne Town FC
- a cricket club, Sherborne CC
- a rugby club, Sherborne RFC.

== International relations ==
Sherborne is a founding member of the Douzelage, a town twinning association of 24 towns across the European Union. This active town twinning began in 1991 and there are regular events, such as a produce market from each of the other countries and festivals.

Discussions regarding membership are also in hand with three further towns (Agros in Cyprus, Škofja Loka in Slovenia and Tryavna in Bulgaria).

- Altea, Spain – 1991
- Bad Kötzting, Germany – 1991
- Bellagio, Italy – 1991
- Bundoran, Ireland – 1991
- Granville, France – 1991
- Holstebro, Denmark – 1991
- Houffalize, Belgium – 1991
- Meerssen, the Netherlands – 1991
- Niederanven, Luxembourg – 1991
- Preveza, Greece – 1991
- Sesimbra, Portugal – 1991
- Karkkila, Finland – 1997
- Oxelösund, Sweden – 1998
- Judenburg, Austria – 1999
- Chojna, Poland – 2004
- Kőszeg, Hungary – 2004
- Sigulda, Latvia – 2004
- Sušice, Czech Republic – 2004
- Türi, Estonia – 2004
- Zvolen, Slovakia – 2007
- Prienai, Lithuania – 2008
- Marsaskala, Malta – 2009
- Siret, Romania – 2010.

Sherbourne Street and Sherbourne (TTC) subway station in Toronto, Canada, were named after the town. It was the birthplace of Upper Canada official and Toronto resident Thomas Ridout.

== Notable residents ==
- Mike Davis (1942–2022), a rugby player and coach with England
- John Hyatt (1767–1826), influential nonconformist pastor and missionary
- The social reformer and moralist Rev. Sir James Marchant died here in 1956
- Olympic sailor Andrew Simpson (1976–2013) lived here
- Olympic field hockey player Michael Walford lived and worked here for many years, before his death in 2002.
