= Blandford Forum =

Market town in Dorset, England

Coordinates: 50.856°N 2.165°W

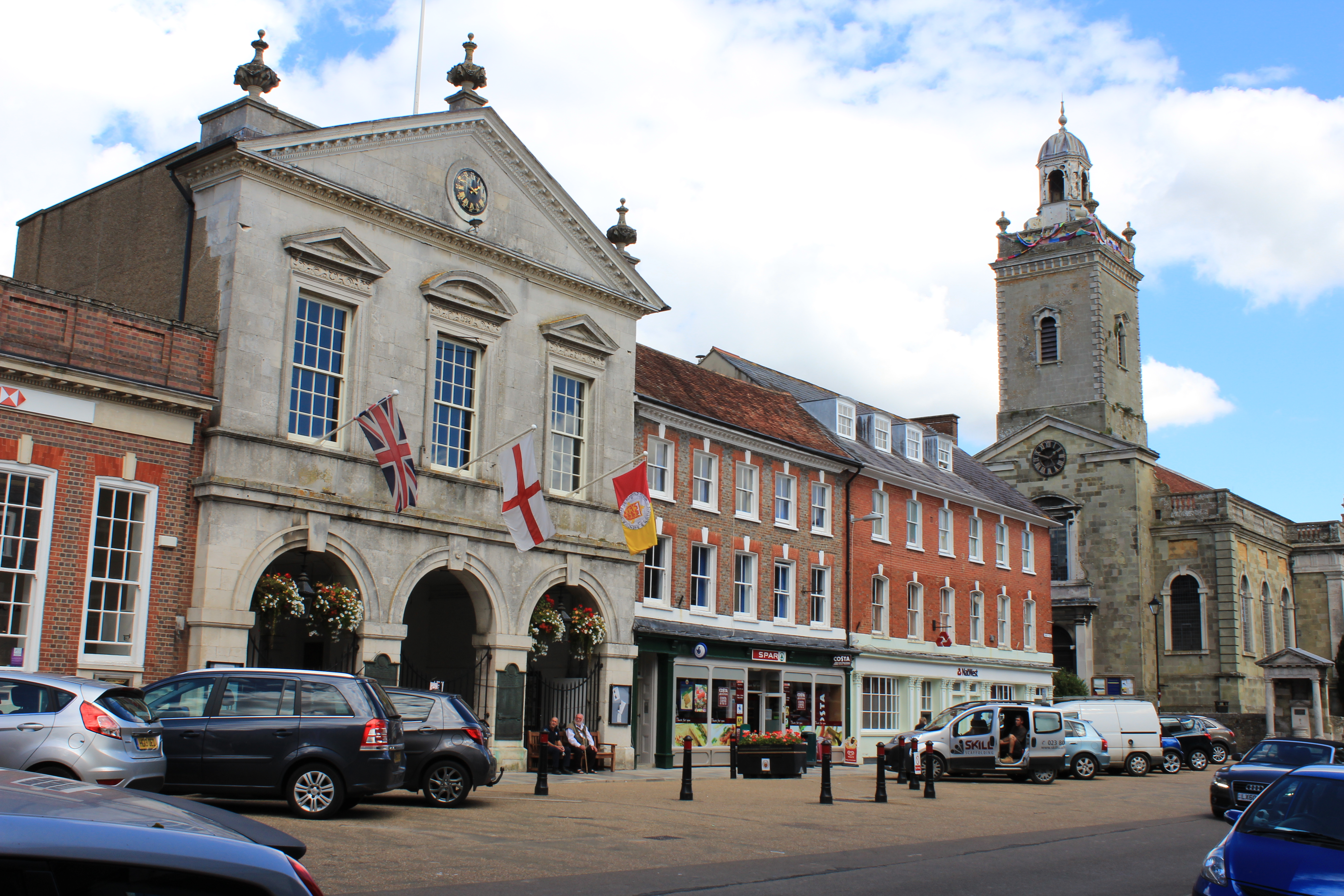
- Market Place, in the town centre

- Location within Dorset
- Population: 10,607 (2021 census)
- OS grid reference: ST886069
  - London: 101 mi (163 km) NE
- Civil parish: Blandford Forum
- Unitary authority: Dorset
- Ceremonial county: Dorset
- Region: South West
- Country: England
- Sovereign state: United Kingdom
- Post town: Blandford Forum
- Postcode district: DT11
- Dialling code: 01258
- Police: Dorset
- Fire: Dorset and Wiltshire
- Ambulance: South Western
- UK Parliament: North Dorset

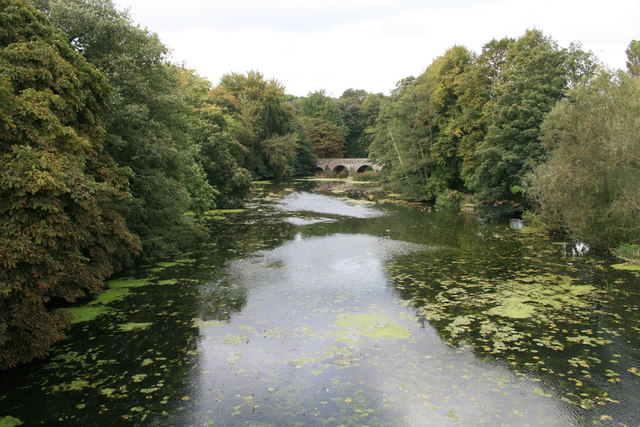
Blandford originated at a fording point over the River Stour

Blandford Forum (/ˈblænfərd/ BLAN-fərd) is a market town in Dorset, England, on the River Stour, 13 miles (21 km) north-west of Poole. It had a population of 10,607 at the 2021 census.

The town is notable for its Georgian architecture, the result of rebuilding after a major fire in 1731; it was assisted by an Act of Parliament and a donation by George II, to designs by local architects John and William Bastard.

The town's economy is based on a mix of the service sector and light industry. Blandford Camp, a military base, is on the hills 2 miles (3 km) north-east of the town. It is the base of the Royal Corps of Signals, the communications wing of the British Army, and the site of the Royal Signals Museum.

== History ==
Blandford has been a fording point on the River Stour since Anglo-Saxon times. The name Blandford derives from the Old English blǣge, and probably means ford where gudgeon or blay are found. The name Blaneford or Bleneford is recorded in the Domesday Book, referring not to Blandford Forum itself but to the adjacent villages of Bryanston and Blandford St Mary on the opposite side of the ford, and Langton Long Blandford further downstream.

By the 13th century, the settlement on the north bank of the river had become a market town with a livestock market serving the nearby Blackmore Vale with its many dairy farms. At the start of the 14th century, it returned two members of parliament and was also known as Cheping Blandford, where Cheping or Chipping refers to a market. The Latin translation Forum was first recorded in 1540.

In Survey of Dorsetshire, written by Thomas Gerard of Trent in the early 1630s, Blandford was described as "a faire Markett Towne, pleasantlie seated upon the River ... well inhabitted and of good Traffique". In the 17th-century English Civil War Blandford was a Royalist centre; most inhabitants supported the king.

In the 18th century Blandford was one of several lace-making centres in the county; Daniel Defoe stated that lace made in the town was "the finest bonelace in England... I think I never saw better in Flanders, France or Italy". In the 17th and 18th centuries Blandford was also a malting and brewing centre of some significance.

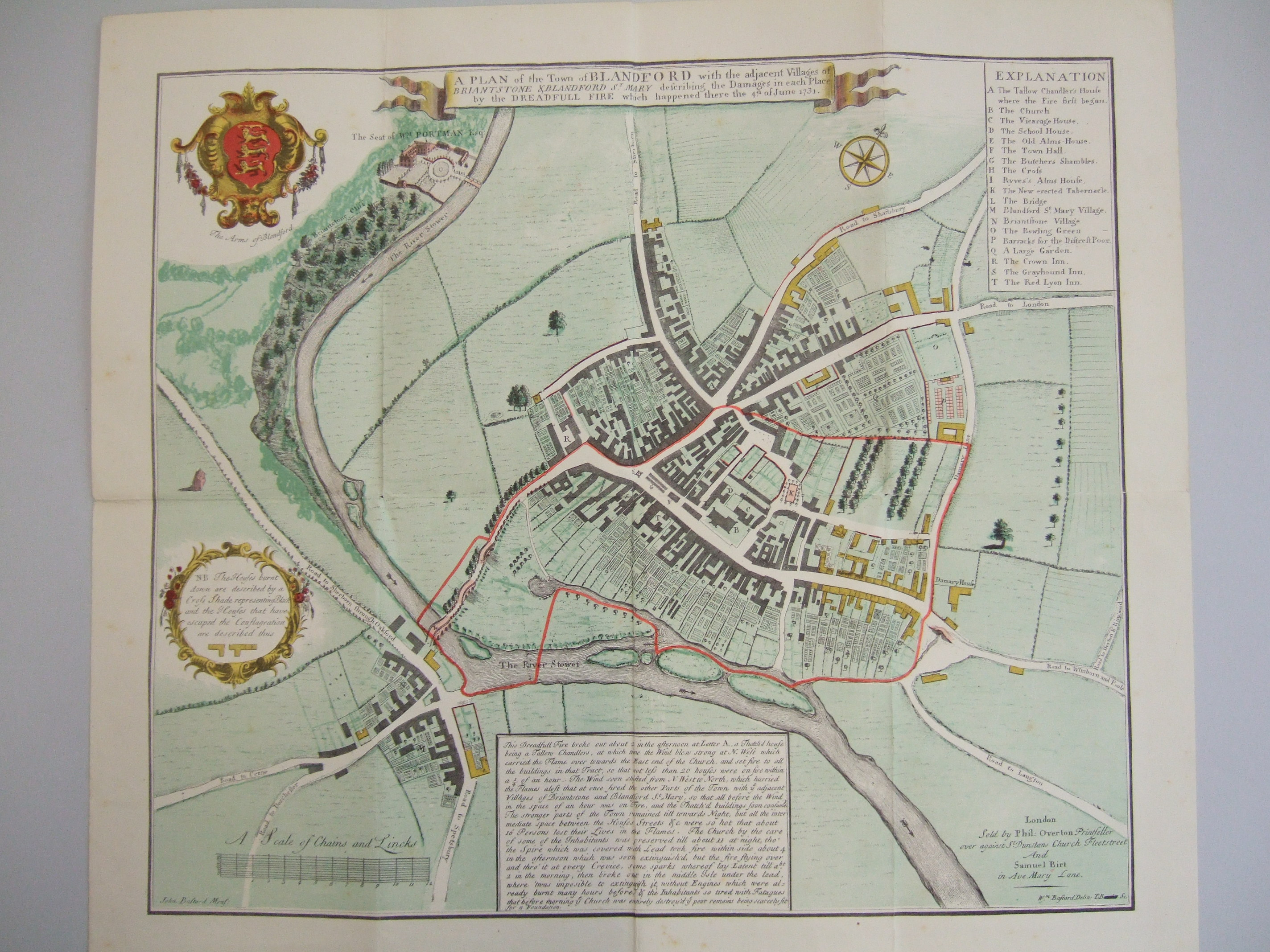
Plan showing the extent of damage of the 1731 fire; the properties shaded black were destroyed, those shaded yellow survived.

Blandford Forum (Rebuilding After the Fire) Act 1731
- Act of Parliament
- Parliament of Great Britain
- Long title: An Act for the better and more easy re-building of the Town of Blandford Forum, in the County of Dorset; and for determining Differences touching Houses and Buildings burnt down or demolished by reason of the late dreadful Fire there.
- Citation: 5 Geo. 2. c. 16
- Territorial extent: Great Britain

Dates
- Royal assent: 1 June 1732
- Commencement: 13 January 1732 (Note: Start of session.)
Other legislation
Relates to	Tiverton (Rebuilding After the Fire) Act 1731

Status: Current legislation

Text of statute as originally enacted

Almost all of Blandford's buildings were destroyed on 4 June 1731 by the "great fire", which was the last of several serious fires that occurred in the 16th, 17th and 18th centuries. The fire began in a tallow chandler's workshop on a site that is now The King's Arms public house. Within a few hours, almost 90% of the town's fabric had gone; all fire-fighting equipment had been lost to the fire and the church's lead roof had melted. Even properties west of the river in Blandford St Mary and Bryanston were burned, though notable buildings that survived in the town include the Ryves Almshouses and Dale House in Salisbury Street, Old House in The Close, and much of East Street, including Stour House. An Act of Parliament was introduced that stated that rebuilding work must be in brick and tile and should begin within four years. With assistance from the rest of the country—including £1,000 given by King George II—the town was rebuilt over the next ten years to the designs of local architects John and William Bastard. Bottlenecks were removed and streets realigned in the new town plan, which also provided a wider market place. As well as residential and commercial property, new buildings included a new town hall, school and church. The redesigned town centre has survived to the present day virtually intact.

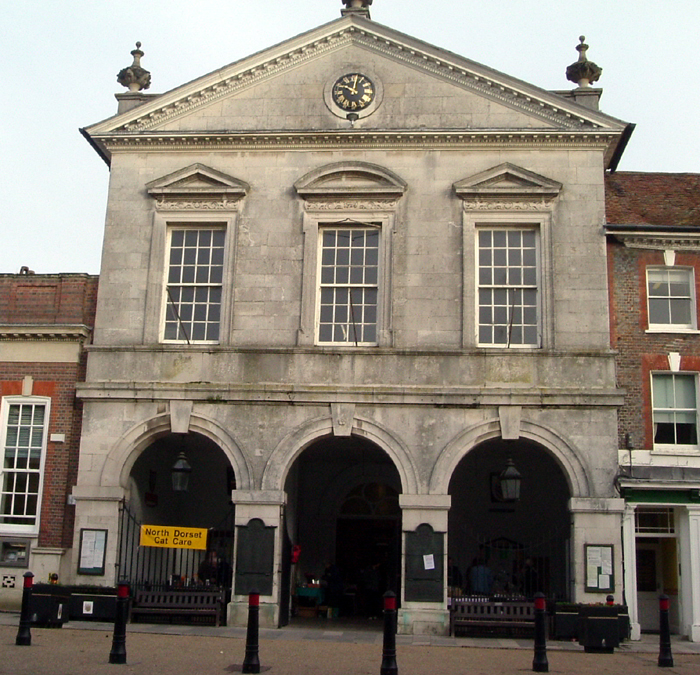
Blandford Forum Town Hall, rebuilt in 1734

After the post-fire reconstruction Blandford remained a thriving market town. Wool spinning and button making were also significant, and the brewing and hostelry trades expanded. The turnpike road between Salisbury and Dorchester was made in 1756 and passed through the town, and the arrival of the coaching era increased the town's prosperity, though the built fabric of the town changed little until the first half of the 19th century, when houses for wealthier inhabitants were built to the north alongside the roads to Salisbury and Shaftesbury. By the time of the 1841 census the town had 3,339 inhabitants. Later in the 19th century, perhaps following the installation of piped water, more densely packed buildings were built to the northeast, replacing gardens and barracks for the poor (that had been erected following the fire) between the roads to Salisbury and Wimborne Minster. Rail transport arrived in Blandford in the 1860s, though this did not impact greatly on the town's economy.

Blandford's weekly animal market disappeared in the 20th century, perhaps a casualty of motorised transport that enabled larger markets to be held in fewer centres (the market at nearby Sturminster Newton increased significantly). By the middle of the 20th century, Blandford Fair, a seasonal sheep fair held in summer and autumn, had also disappeared, due to changes in animal husbandry and a reduction in sheep numbers in the county.

== Governance ==
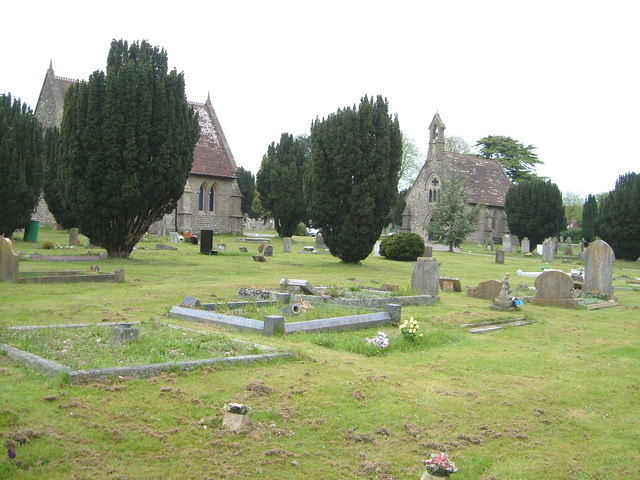
Blandford Cemetery, one of the responsibilities of the Town Council

The civil parish has a parish council, styled Blandford Forum Town Council, of 16 members. This has responsibilities that include outdoor fitness and play areas, CCTV, the cemetery and allotments, venue hire, the indoor market, grass cutting and grit bins.

For local government, Blandford Forum is in Dorset unitary district. For elections to Dorset Council, the Blandford ward has the same boundaries as the parish. Historically, the town was a municipal borough from 1835 until 1974, and from 1894 its hinterland was a rural district named after the town. In 1974, the borough and district were absorbed into the new North Dorset district, which was in turn abolished when Dorset became a unitary district in 2019.

In the House of Commons, Blandford is in the North Dorset constituency whose current member of Parliament (MP) is Simon Hoare of the Conservative party.

== Geography ==
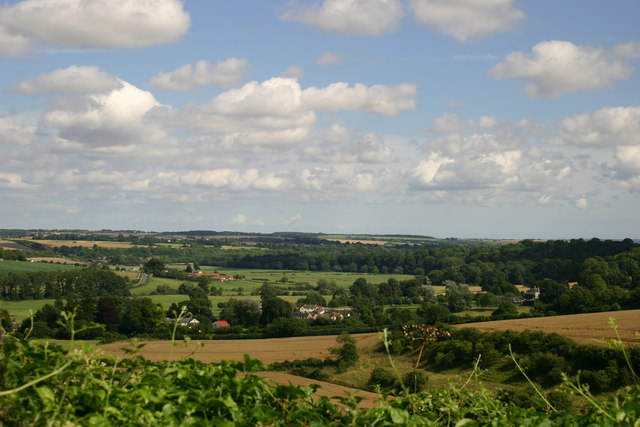
The Stour Valley immediately north of the town; much of the countryside around Blandford is designated as an Area of Outstanding Natural Beauty

Blandford is situated between Cranborne Chase and the Dorset Downs, to the south-east of the Blackmore Vale, 13 mi (21 km) northwest of Poole and 22 mi (35 km) south-west of Salisbury. It is sited in the valley of the River Stour, mostly on rising ground northeast of the river, but with some development south of the river at Blandford St Mary. The underlying geology is Cretaceous chalk bedrock that in places is overlain by Quaternary drift: alluvium in the river's flood plain, head deposits around the town's south-west, south and south-east borders, and clay with flints at the highest part of the town in the north. The town is almost surrounded by land that has been designated as having landscape value of national significance: the Dorset National Landscape (an Area of Outstanding Natural Beauty, or AONB) to the west and the Cranborne Chase and West Wiltshire Downs AONB to the north and east.

== Architecture ==
Most of the buildings in Blandford's centre are Georgian, due to the rebuilding after the 1731 fire and the absence of subsequent change. Pevsner stated that "hardly any other town in England can be compared with it". A 1970 report by Donald Insall Associates described Blandford as "the most complete and cohesive surviving example of a Georgian country town in England", with the Market Place area in particular given the status of "An Area of National Importance" and described as "a brilliant master piece" [sic]. Buildings that have received Grade I listing by English Heritage are the parish church of St Peter and St Paul, the town hall and corn exchange, The Old House, Coupar House, Pump House, and several buildings in Market Place: numbers 18, 20 and 26, and the old Greyhound Inn. All the listed structures in Market Place, including the church and another seventeen buildings with either Grade II or Grade II* status, form a group, together with several listed properties in West Street and East Street.

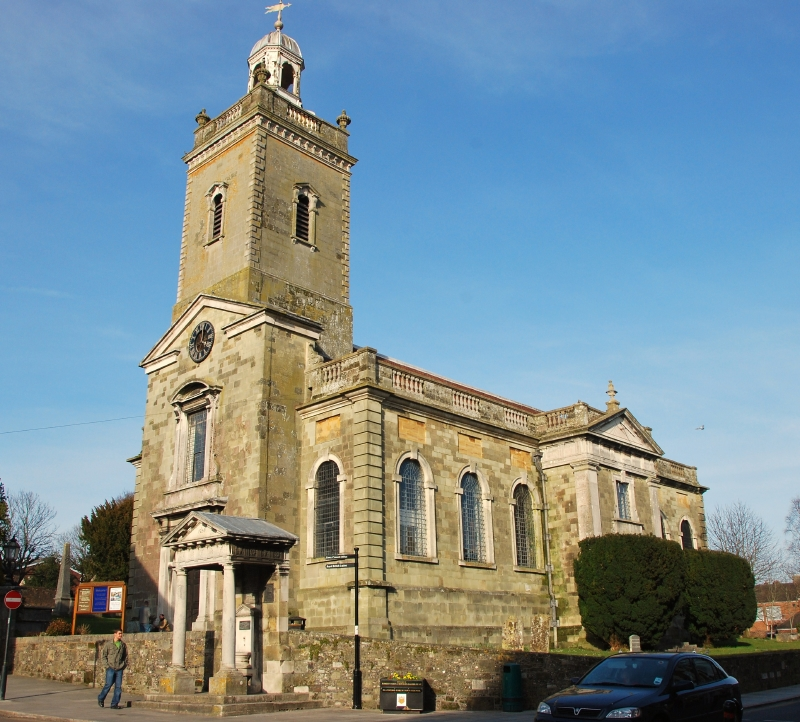
Church of St. Peter and St. Paul

The parish church of St Peter and St Paul was built between 1732 and 1739 and is a classical building with a cupola on top of the tower. The design by John Bastard originally specified that the tower would have a steeple, but lack of money resulted in the wooden cupola instead, a decision that disgusted Bastard, who stated that "it will not keep the wett nor the weather out". Sir Frederick Treves was not a fan of the church's appearance, describing it in his 1906 Highways & Byways in Dorset as "ugly, and only tolerable from a distance". The interior remains relatively unaffected by Victorian interference and retains its font, pulpit, box pews and Mayoral seat. The pulpit, originally designed for St Antholin's in London, is by Sir Christopher Wren. The organ, dating from 1794, is by George Pike England and is the most intact of his surviving works; it allegedly had been intended for the Savoy Chapel in London, but was too big, so George III supposedly gave it to Blandford instead. In 1893 the church was enlarged by moving the apsidal sanctuary out on rollers onto new foundations and building a new chancel behind it. The Victorians did install galleries to accommodate an increasing congregation, though these were removed in the 1970s, a change that Pevsner called "a visual blessing".

Blandford Forum Town Hall occupies a site in the Market Place close to the site that was occupied by its predecessor. It dates from 1734 and has a two-storey three-windowed frontage of Portland stone ashlar. The ground floor has three semi-circular arches leading to an open portico or loggia, called The Shambles, that used to be part of the market. Toward the back of the building is the old corn exchange, a late 19th-century assembly hall with "interesting elliptical roof-trusses".

Coupar House, dated around 1750, is the largest private house in Blandford that dates from the post-fire period. It has a richly decorated interior with a notable staircase, and is unique among the town's private dwellings for having Portland stone dressings to its brick façade, though the design of this frontage has been described as "curiously amateurish" with "little attention ... paid to rules of proportion".

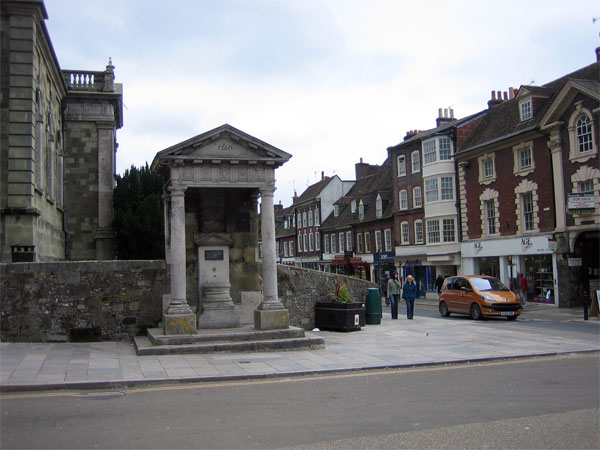
Pump House fire monument

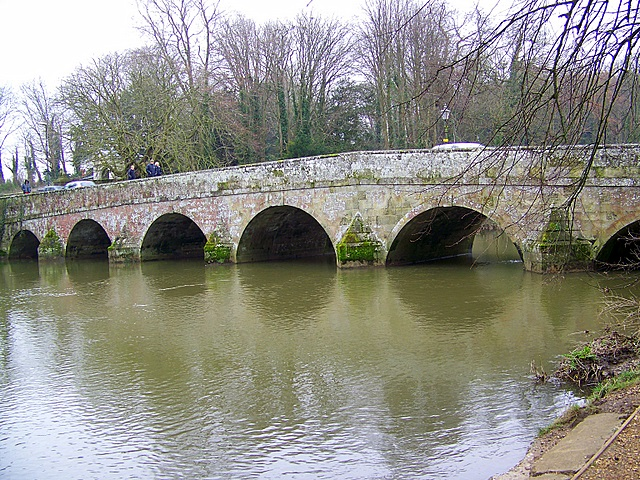
Bridge over the River Stour

The Old House was probably built some time between 1650 and 1670 by a German doctor who practised in Blandford after graduating from The Queen's College, Oxford. Its unusual design, which includes a steep hipped roof with wide spreading eaves, has elements of artisan style popular at the time, though it was described by John Hutchins as "an architectural graft from the 'fatherland' planted by the worthy doctor on the soil of his adopted country".

The Pump House fire monument was built by John Bastard in classical style to commemorate the fire. It dates from 1760, is of Portland stone and stands adjacent to the churchyard wall. The inscription on its rear wall states its purpose is "... to prevent by a timely Supply of Water, (with God's Blessing) the fatal Consequences of FIRE hereafter". In 1768 Bastard provided an endowment of £600. The monument was repaired in 1858 and the pump was replaced by a fountain in 1897.

To the south of the town a six-arch stone bridge spans the River Stour; it is built mostly of greensand with some heathstone and was extensively restored in 1726. The water meadows between it and the town are crossed by a causeway and two smaller bridges.

== Demographics ==
The 2021 census recorded a parish population of 10,607 in 4,857 households. The Office for National Statistics also define a Blandford Forum built-up-area, which includes the built-up part of Blandford St Mary parish adjacent to the town south of the River Stour, and which had a population of 11,800 in 2021.

Previous census returns for the town show that it had a population of less than 4,000 until 1981, after which it increased rapidly. In the 2001 census, the town had 4,524 dwellings and a population of 8,760, of whom 96.5% were White British.

Census population of Blandford Forum parish
Census	Population	Female	Male	Households	Notes and sources
1801	2,326	1,298	1,028		
1811	2,425	1,408	1,017		
1821	2,643	1,447	1,196		
1831	3,109	1,703	1,406		
1841	3,349	1,771	1,578		
1851	3,948	2,075	1,873		
1881	3,791	2,050	1,741		
1891	3,985	2,093	1,892		
1901	3,649	1,926	1,723	854	Followed boundary changes. (Note: Several changes were made in 1894 and 1896, with areas being transferred both to and from neighbouring parishes.)
1911	3,477	1,755	1,722	842	
1921	3,193	1,668	1,525	835	
1931	3,370	1,791	1,579	952	Followed a boundary change. (Note: Blandford Forum gained parts of Bryanston, Langton Long Blandford, and Pimperne parishes.)
1951	3,667	1,968	1,699	1,127	
1961	3,566	1,935	1,631	1,202	
1971	3,650				
1981	3,920				Followed a boundary change. (Note: Some of the population increase can be accounted for by a boundary change which incorporated housing estates that already existed but were previously within a different parish (Pimperne) on the town's northern side.)
1991	7,850				
2001	8,745	4,495	4,250	3,878	
2011	10,325	5,168	5,157	4,560	Includes Langton Long Blandford.
2021	10,607	5,461	5,146	4,857	

== Economy ==
Important sectors in Blandford's economy include public administration, education and health (41% of non-agricultural employment), distribution, accommodation and food (25% of non-agricultural employment) and production and construction (19% of non-agricultural employment). In 2012 there were 3,900 people working in the town, 55% of whom worked full-time and 45% part-time. Between July 1997 and July 2013 the unemployment rate for residents of working age varied between 0.5% and 2.5%. There are five industrial estates and business parks in and around the town: Blandford Heights Industrial Estate (9.47 hectares or 23.4 acres), Holland Way Industrial Estate (7.32 hectares or 18.1 acres), Sunrise Business Park (5.6 hectares or 14 acres), Uplands Industrial Park (1.34 hectares or 3.3 acres) and Clump Farm Industrial Estate (1.30 hectares or 3.2 acres). These are sited mostly toward the bypass road to the north-east of the town. In 2009 there were 370 firms providing employment in the town.

Major government employers in the town include the Environment Agency and Dorset Council, whose offices on Salisbury Road were until 2019 the home of North Dorset District Council. Major employers that are funded by government include Dorset HealthCare University NHS Foundation Trust and the communications wing of the British Army, the Royal Corps of Signals, based at Blandford Camp about 2 km (1 1/4 mi) north-east of the town. Blandford Camp incorporates a modern technology training college.

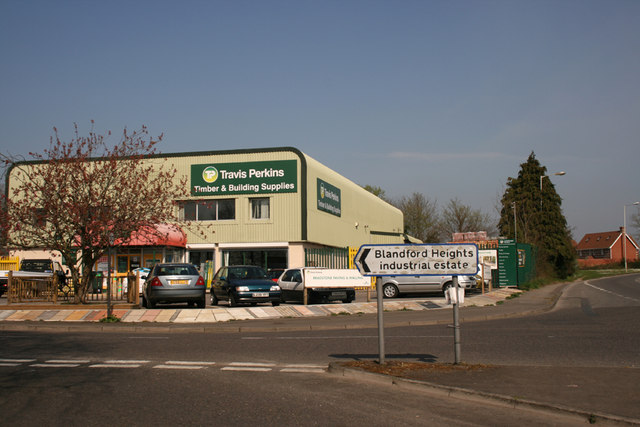
Blandford Heights industrial estate on the northern edge of the town

Major retail employers in the town include the Co-op (previously Somerfield) and Tesco, though in 2015 the Co-op site was sold to Marks & Spencer, which opened a food hall. In 2005 there were 110 shops in the town, with a total floorspace of 9,800 square metres (105,000 square feet). Other national chains with a presence in the town include Iceland, Boots, Homebase and WHSmith. An outdoor market takes place every Thursday and Saturday, and there is a bi-weekly indoor market held in the Corn Exchange. Blandford's shopping catchment area (major food shopping), which extends about 8 miles (13 km) north-east and south-west and about 5 mi (8 km) north-west and south-east, had a population of about 24,200 in 2001.

In education, important employers in the area include Bryanston School, Clayesmore senior school at Iwerne Minster about 5 mi (8 km) north, and The Forum School at Shillingstone 5 mi (8 km) north-west.

Other important employers in the town include Damory Coaches, the brewing company Hall and Woodhouse, Hospital Metalcraft, metal tube manipulators Iracroft Ltd, trolley maintenance company KJ Pike & Sons, Signpost Housing Association, Wessex Homes Park and Leisure Ltd.

== Transport ==
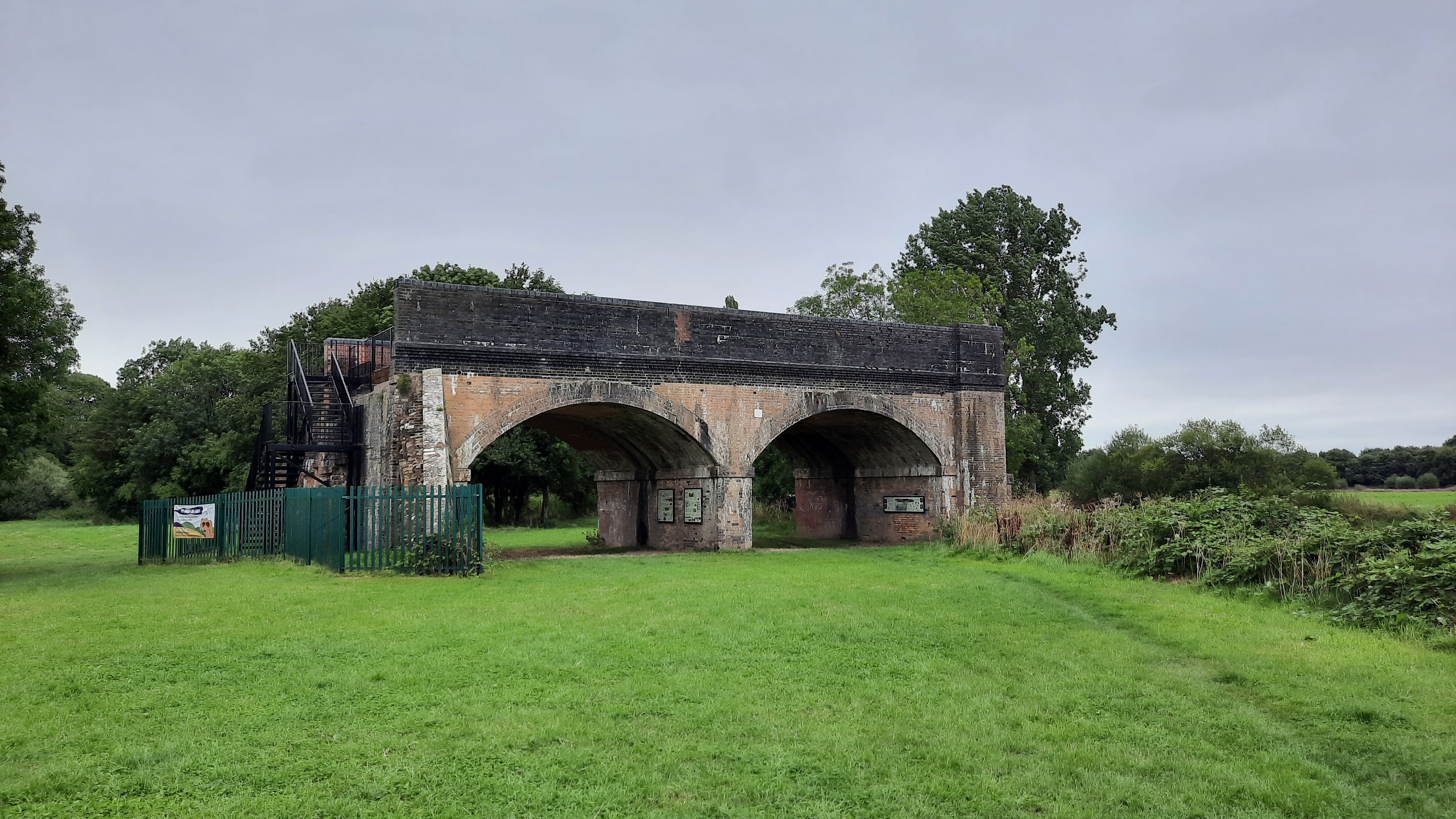
Former Somerset and Dorset railway bridge at Blandford Forum. Following closure of the line, the span over the river (right) was demolished, and the earth embankment on the left was reused for nearby flood defence work, leaving it as a bridge to nowhere.

Blandford lies at the junction of the A350 and A354 main roads but is skirted by an eastern bypass. The main road running through the town is the B3082, connecting Blandford Forum to Wimborne Minster. Blandford Forum is around 33 miles (53 kilometres) southwest of junction 1 of the M27 motorway at Cadnam. Buses run from the town to locations including Poole, Bournemouth, Salisbury and Shaftesbury, with the primary operator being Damory.

Blandford is 15 mi (24 km) from Bournemouth Airport and 15 mi (24 km) from Poole railway station. From 1860 to 1966, Blandford Forum was a stop on the Somerset and Dorset Joint Railway, which ran from Bath to Bournemouth, though until the bridge was built over the river Stour, opening in 1863, the Dorset Central section of the line terminated at the hamlet of Blandford St. Mary. Blandford Forum railway station, along with the whole line, closed to passengers in 1966. Located between Templecombe and Broadstone, the railway was still open until the closure of the Blandford's goods yard in 1969, after which the track was lifted. The station was immortalised in 1964 in the song "Slow Train" by Flanders and Swann: "No more will I go to Blandford Forum ...".

Blandford Camp was served by a short-lived three-mile branch line, which left the main line just north of the river bridge. This operated intermittently from 1918 to 1928. Because of the significant gradient of the line (a rise of about 180 feet over the three miles), heavier trains required tank engines (and occasionally banking engines) to negotiate the steep ascent up to the camp.

== Education ==
Blandford Forum has two primary schools: Archbishop Wake and Milldown. A new Archbishop Wake school, built on the old St Leonards Middle School site at the bottom of Black Lane, opened in November 2008. The other feeder schools for The Blandford School are Blandford St Mary, Downlands, Dunbury and Durweston, Pimperne, and Spetisbury Primary Schools. Pupils move at the age of 11 to The Blandford School, which is a secondary school lying in the west of Blandford; the school also has a sixth form.

A number of private schools are also located near Blandford, such as Bryanston School, Canford School, Clayesmore School, Hanford School, Knighton House School and Milton Abbey School.

== Art, culture and media ==
Blandford Georgian Fayre, a one-day celebration of the town's Georgian heritage, is held in the town centre every year in the first week of May. The event includes cultural presentations, stalls, historical re-enactments, music and dancing, and a fun fair on the meadows along the banks of the River Stour. The town also hosts an annual carnival and the Great Dorset Steam Fair is held at nearby Tarrant Hinton.

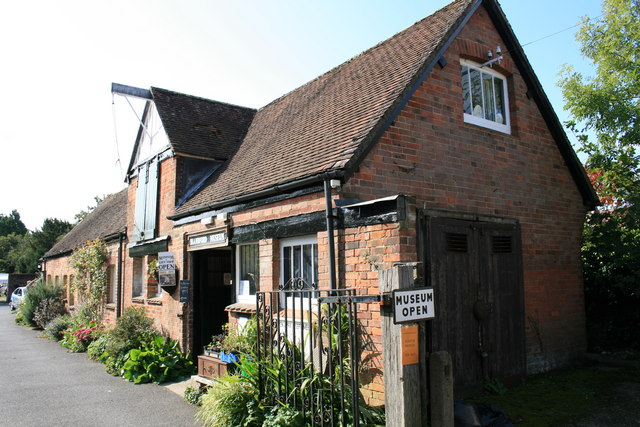
Blandford Town Museum

There are three museums in Blandford and its vicinity: Blandford Town Museum in Bere's Yard, Blandford Fashion Museum in The Plocks, and the Royal Signals Museum at Blandford Camp military base. Blandford Town Museum has no admission charge but is not open on Sundays or during the winter. It has artefacts from the history of the town and the surrounding area, and a small Victorian garden that was created in 2008. Blandford Fashion Museum has collections of fashions between the early 18th century and the 1970s; it is also closed in the winter. The Royal Signals Museum contains items relating to the history of the Royal Corps of Signals and military communication since the Napoleonic Wars.

In 1590, Edmund Spenser mentioned the Stoure flowing through the town in The Faerie Queene.

Blandford features in Thomas Hardy's novels as the Wessex town of Shottesford Forum.

Blandford Forum railway station which is now gone – the train line to Blandford was removed in the 1960s – was mentioned in the 1963 song Slow Train by Flanders and Swann.

Local radio stations are BBC Radio Solent on 103.8 FM, Greatest Hits Radio South (formerly Wessex FM) on 96.6 FM and BFBS Radio, which broadcasts on 89.3 FM from a studio at the military base as part of its UK Bases network. Local news and television programmes are provided by BBC South and ITV Meridian. Television signals are received from the Rowridge TV transmitter and the local relay transmitter situated in Winterborne Stickland. BBC West and ITV West Country can also be received from the Mendip TV transmitter.

Blandford Forum is twinned with Mortain in France and Preetz in Germany.

== Sport and leisure ==
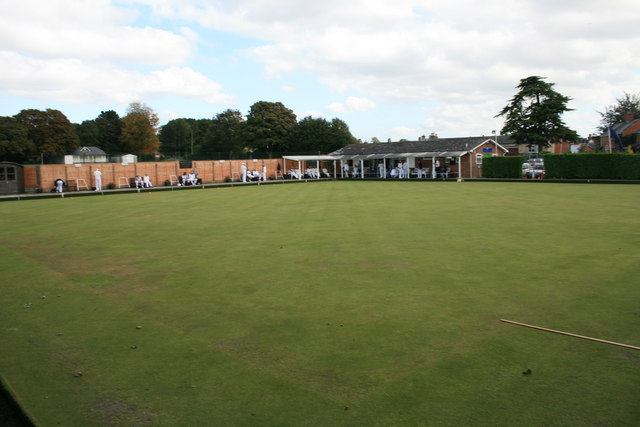
Blandford Bowls Club

Blandford Forum has a Non-League football club, Blandford United F.C., who play at Blandford Recreation Ground. Blandford Bowls Club play in several men's and women's leagues and have a six rinks green, also on the recreation ground on Milldown Road. Blandford Cricket Club has three men's teams that play in divisions in a local county league, plus several youth teams that compete in the North Dorset Junior leagues. The club has its own cricket ground at the top of Whitecliff Mill Street. Blandford Rugby Football Club are based at Larksmead Recreational Ground.

== Community facilities ==
Blandford Community Hospital on Milldown Road provides minor and day surgery, occupational therapy, outpatient and community rehabilitation services, palliative care, community mental health services and physiotherapy. Blandford Library, located on The Tabernacle, has music and feature films for hire as well as books, and has internet access and reference works available.

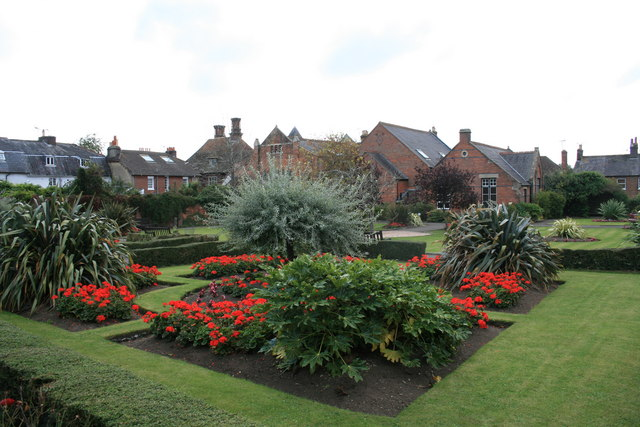
Woodhouse Gardens

Public open spaces in Blandford include Park Road Recreation Ground, which has football and cricket pitches and associated pavilions, and Larksmead Playing Field, which has two rugby pitches, and is the home of Blandford Rugby Club. There are also local authority controlled football and rugby union pitches at The Blandford School in Milldown Road. Next to the main post office in the town centre is Woodhouse Gardens, a small public garden that contains a pavilion that can be hired for events.

== Natural history ==
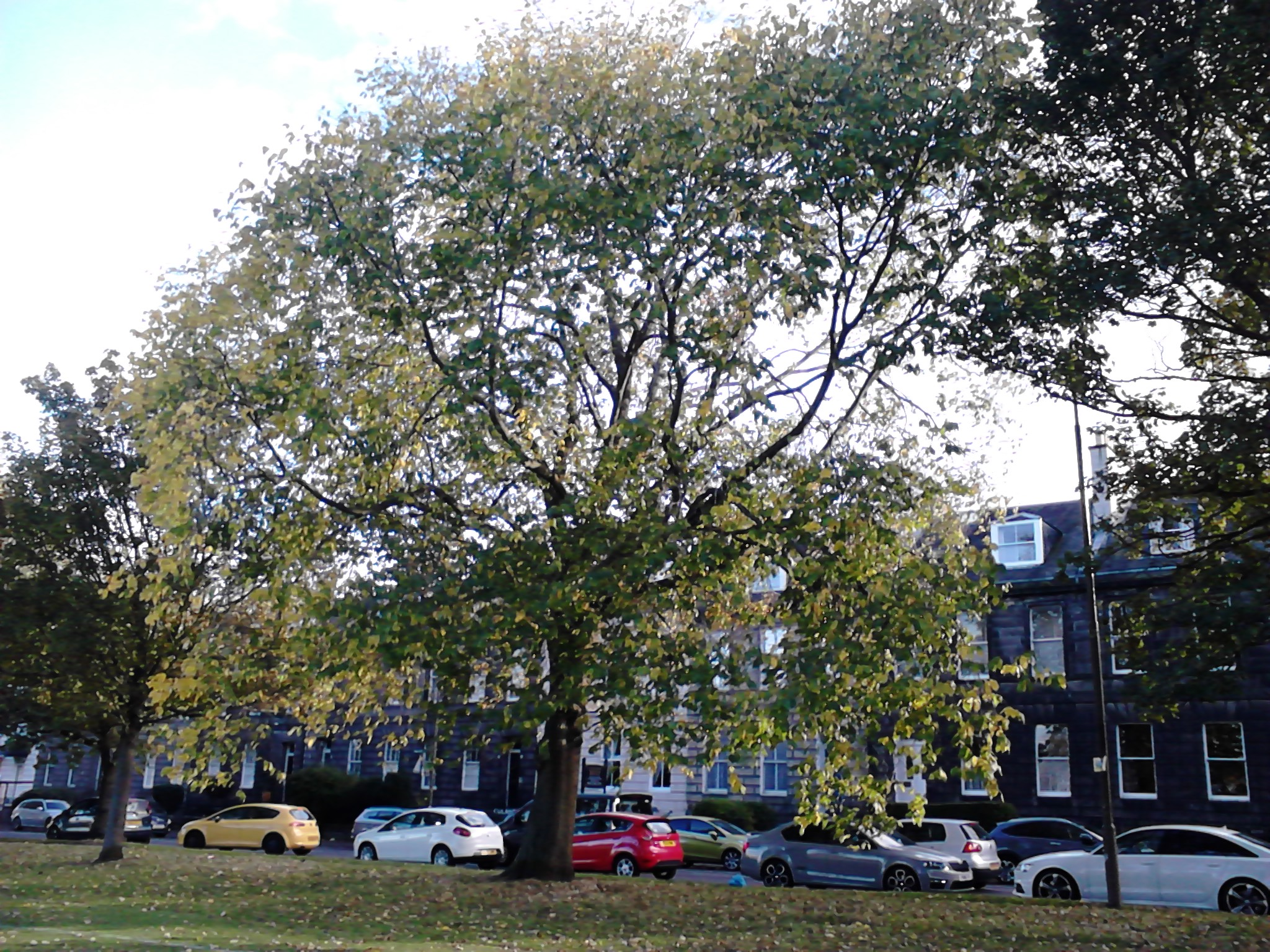
Blandford Elm, Edinburgh (2016)

The Blandford fly (Simulium posticatum), a small (2–3 mm) biting fly belonging to the family Simuliidae or "blackflies" lives in the area. In recent years the weed beds in the river have been sprayed to reduce numbers.

Blandford Elm (Ulmus glabra Huds. 'Superba') is a (now rare) very large-leaved wych cultivar, first raised by nurseryman Gill of Blandford Forum in the early 1840s, and distributed by nurseries in the UK, Europe and the USA. Only one specimen is known to survive (2020), in Edinburgh.

== Notable residents ==
Blandford is the birthplace of three eighteenth-century bishops: William Wake (1657–1737), Archbishop of Canterbury; Thomas Lindesay (1656–1724), Archbishop of Armagh; and Samuel Lisle (1683–1749), Bishop of Norwich.

Members of the influential aristocratic Pitt family were born in Blandford, including William Pitt, Thomas Pitt, Robert Pitt and his wife Harriet Villiers.

Frederick Abberline (1843–1929), the former chief inspector for the London Metropolitan Police during the hunt for Jack the Ripper, was born in Blandford. The composer and organist Albert Mallinson (1878–1946) lived in Blandford. The music hall performer Sam Cowell (1820–1864) died in the town, and is buried there.

The sculptor Alfred Stevens (1817–1875), who created the Duke of Wellington's monument in St Paul's Cathedral, was born in Blandford, as were Reginald Heber Roe (1850–1926), the first vice-chancellor of the University of Queensland, and the surgeon Sir Alfred Downing Fripp. Sir Roy Welensky (1907–1991), Prime Minister of the Federation of Rhodesia and Nyasaland from 1956 until 1963, lived in Blandford from 1981 until his death.

== Sources ==
- J. H. Bettey (1974). Dorset. City & County Histories. David & Charles. ISBN 0-7153-6371-9.
- Blandford Forum Information at Dorset County Council (pdf) – Accessed January 2006
