= Chideock =

Village and civil parish in Dorset, England

Coordinates: 50.7324°N 2.8208°W

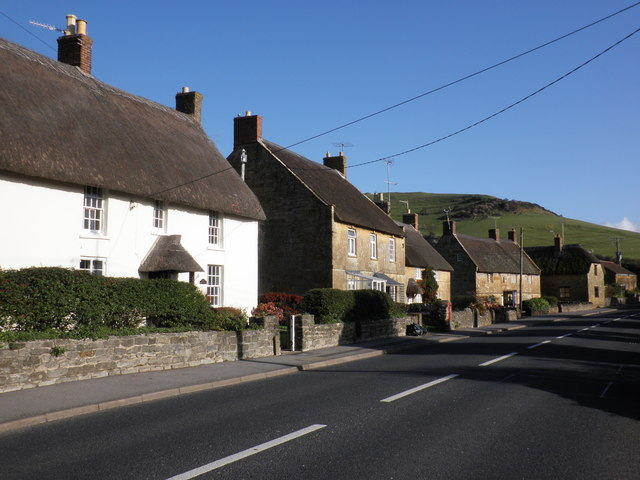
- The main road in Chideock

- Location within Dorset
- Population: 618 (2021 census)
- OS grid reference: SY423928
- Unitary authority: Dorset
- Ceremonial county: Dorset
- Region: South West
- Country: England
- Sovereign state: United Kingdom
- Post town: Bridport
- Postcode district: DT6
- Police: Dorset
- Fire: Dorset and Wiltshire
- Ambulance: South Western
- UK Parliament: West Dorset
- Website: Village website

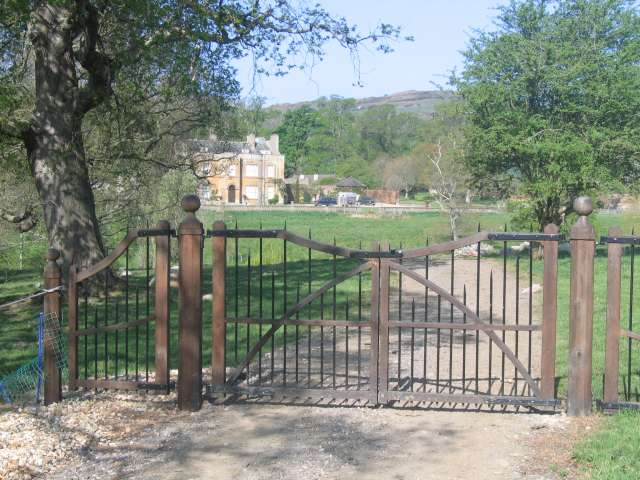
Entrance to Chideock Manor

Chideock (/ˈtʃɪdək/ CHID-ək) is a village and civil parish in south west Dorset, England, situated close to the English Channel between Bridport and Lyme Regis. In 2021, the population was 618.

Chideock's economy mostly comprises agriculture (arable and pastoral) and tourism. The parish is in the Dorset National Landscape area and includes part of the Jurassic Coast, a World Heritage Site.

During much of its history Chideock has had a strong tradition of Catholicism; in the late 16th century four Chideock men were executed for their faith and became known as the Chideock Martyrs. There is a memorial to the men in the village.

The A35 trunk road passes through the village, which means the main street can have high volumes of traffic.

== Etymology ==
The name of Chideock is first attested in the Domesday Book of 1086, as Cidihoc. This name is unusual in England for being derived from Common Brittonic, in this case the word that survives in modern Welsh as coediog ("wooded").

== History ==
In 1379–80 John de Chideock, a manorial lord, built Chideock Castle just north of the village. During the Middle Ages ownership passed to the Catholic Arundell family, who used it to provide refuge for priests and loyal followers during subsequent religious persecution. During the Protestant reign of Elizabeth I the Arundell estate became Dorset's main centre of Catholicism, and the locality witnessed considerable religious strife. Four local Catholic men—John Cornelius, Thomas Bosgrave, John Carey and Patrick Salmon—were martyred in the late 16th century; their trial took place in the main hall of what is now Chideock House Hotel and they were executed in Dorchester. The men became known as the Chideock Martyrs. A fifth man, Hugh Green, who became Chideock's chaplain in 1612, was tried and executed in 1642. All five were beatified on 15 December 1929.

During the English Civil War Chideock was a royalist stronghold, and the castle changed hands more than once before it was ultimately left ruinous in 1645 by parliamentarian forces under the Governor of Lyme Regis, Colonel Ceeley. Chideock House Hotel may have been the headquarters of General Fairfax as he planned the castle's overthrowing. Parts of the castle remained standing until at least 1733 but only some of the moat can be seen today; it is in a field, accessed by Ruins Lane, and marked by a crucifix as a memorial to the martyrs.

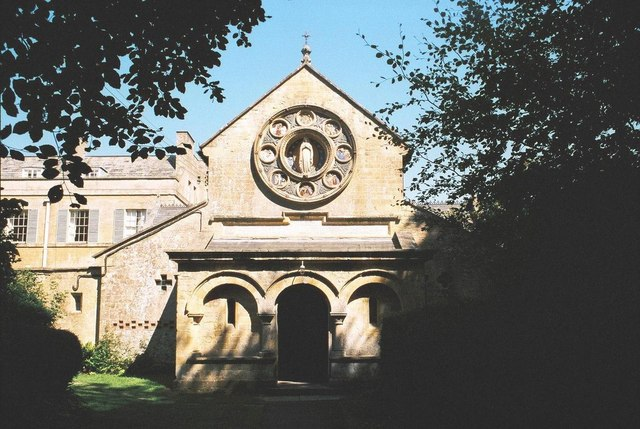
The Roman Catholic church of Our Lady Queen of Martyrs, and St Ignatius

In 1802 the Arundells were succeeded by the Weld family of Lulworth Castle who in 1810 built Chideock Manor. The Welds were also Catholic and in 1870–2 Charles Weld designed and built the village's Roman Catholic church in an unusual Romanesque style. It is dedicated to Our Lady Queen of Martyrs, and St Ignatius and remains in trust to the Weld family.

Among other surviving relics claimed by this location is St. Thomas More's hair shirt, sent to Margaret Roper the day before his martyrdom and later presented for safe keeping by Margaret Clement. This was long in the custody of the community of Augustinian canonesses who, until 1983, lived at the convent at Abbotskerswell Priory, Devon. More recent sources, however, state that the shirt is now preserved at the Roman Catholic Buckfast Abbey, part of a Benedictine monastery, in Devon.

== Governance ==
At the lowest level of local government, Chideock is a civil parish with a parish council of 7 members.

At the upper level of local government, Chideock is in Dorset unitary district. For elections to Dorset Council, it is in Marshwood Vale electoral ward. Historically, Chideock was in Bridport Rural District from 1894 to 1974, and then West Dorset district until Dorset became unitary in 2019.

For elections to the national parliament, Chideock is in the West Dorset parliamentary constituency, which is currently represented by the Liberal Democrat Edward Morello.

== Geography ==
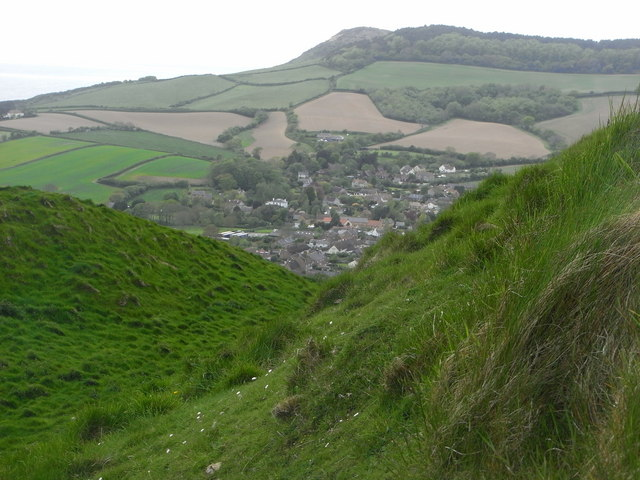
Chideock from Quarry Hill

Chideock is situated in the Dorset Council administrative area about 2.5 miles (4.0 km) west of Bridport, 5 miles (8.0 km) east of Lyme Regis and 0.75 miles (1.21 km) inland from the English Channel. The parish includes the coastal hamlet of Seatown, which is less than 1 mile (1.6 km) to the south on the Jurassic Coast, a World Heritage Site. Seatown has a long shelving pebble beach, with views up towards the hill which forms Golden Cap, which at 191 metres (627 ft) is the highest cliff on the south coast of England. Fossilised ammonites and belemnites can often be found on the beach due to continued coastal erosion of the soft blue lias clays which make up the cliffs. Iron-rich rocks such as lodestone and magnetite can also be found on the beaches near the village – these are thought to have been transported down the coast from Chesil Beach, having been deposited there by a shipwreck in the 1800s. Similar collections of these rocks can be found on beaches along the Jurassic Coast and in the neighbouring counties of Hampshire and the Isle of Wight.

== Demography ==
Census population of Chideock parish
Census	Population	Female	Male	Households	Source
1921	548				
1931	542				
1951	610				
1961	559				
1971	560				
1981	650				
1991	690				
2001	686	351	335	322	
2011	686	355	331	325	
2021	618	317	301	307	

Data for the 2001 and 2011 censuses include the sparsely-populated neighbouring parish of Stanton St Gabriel.

== Transport ==
The A35 trunk road between Honiton and Southampton passes through Chideock, which in 1997 was the first village in Britain to have two speed cameras installed in response to perceived excessive speed. All speeding fines paid until 2007 had to be refunded when it emerged that the Traffic Regulation Order imposing the speed limit had referred to the junction with Seatown Road whereas that road (which does lead to Seatown) is actually Duck Street. The National Trust refused permission for a prospective bypass over land it owns to the north of Golden Cap, citing its importance in the Dorset National Landscape. On 4 May 2010 a protest against the lack of a bypass was initiated by some residents and involved constant operation of a pedestrian crossing at the centre of the village for one hour's duration every week. This campaign continued for a year and may result in restrictions on heavy goods vehicles in the village.
