= 1801 United Kingdom census =

Census of the population of the United Kingdom

Census 1801
- March 10, 1801
- Map of Great Britain in the late 1700s

General information
- Country: United Kingdom

The 1801 United Kingdom census was the first decennial census of England, Scotland and Wales. The census has been repeated every ten years thereafter with the exception of the 1941 census due to the outbreak of World War Two. Held on the night of Tuesday, 10 March 1801, it estimated the population of England and Wales to be 8.9 million, and that of Scotland was 1.6 million. Ireland was not included in the census until 1821.

== Background ==
The first census of England had been carried out by William I and published in the Domesday Book in 1086. Various other censuses had taken place, such as that in the sixteenth century, in which bishops were asked to count the communicants or number of families in their dioceses. In the latter part of the eighteenth century, there were several proposals for a Census Bill and a growing concern about the population of Britain and its demand for food, particularly fuelled by the publication in 1798 of Thomas Robert Malthus's An Essay on the Principle of Population. The Census Bill was presented to Parliament on 20 November 1800, passed on 3 December and received royal assent on 31 December.

The idea of a census had been championed, in the House of Commons, by Charles Abbot, MP for Helston, Cornwall, and future Speaker of the House of Commons. Prompted by the 1800 crop failure, which led to significant increases in food prices, a manufacturing recession and mass unemployment, and riots, Abbot believed the crisis could be solved, and future crises averted, by better knowledge of population, "wise legislation and good government". A census, Abbot argued, would enable the government to plan the distribution of grain supplies more effectively. Learning from a 1753 attempt to introduce an individual-level census combined with civil registration of births, marriages and deaths, Abbot's plan was designed to collect only a limited amount of information. Abbot was assisted in his plan by John Rickman who was a clerk in the House of Commons. Rickman subsequently undertook the analysis of the results and the preparation of abstracts and reports from the 1801 census (and the three following censuses).

== Administration of the 1801 census ==
The 1801 census was geared to collecting data on an aggregate rather than an individual basis. Only statistical summaries were to be provided to the Government in Whitehall, on government issued enumeration forms: authorities neither requested nor required information about individuals. Information was to be collected from every household by census enumerators who in England and Wales were usually the local Overseers of the Poor, aided by constables, tithingmen, headboroughs and other officers of the peace. In March 1801 every Overseer was charged with walking to every house or dwelling in their parish and from their visits compiling the following data for their area (parish, township or place):

- Number of inhabited houses and the number of families inhabiting them, and the number of uninhabited houses;
- Number of people, by sex, excluding men on active military service;
- Number of people occupied in agriculture, in trade, manufacture or handicraft, or not occupied in those classes;
- Any other remarks.

In addition to this, local clergy were also called upon to supply data for the following:

- Number of baptisms, by sex, in various years over the preceding century;
- Number of marriages, annually, since 1754.

The figures obtained in each parish throughout England and Wales were presented to magistrates at the Easter Quarter Sessions and from there were sent on to the Home Office in Whitehall to be tallied. However, it was found that overseers and priests in England and Wales often had either not supplied the data using the centrally issued forms, or had not been able to compile it at all. As a result, many places in England and Wales lacked returns. In Scotland, however, the responsibility for taking the count was placed on parish schoolmasters, and in recognition of the remoteness of many parishes they were given an extra six months in which to collect the information and return it to London. On the mainland of Scotland there was almost a complete return, owing to the efficiency of the schoolmasters.

Analysis of the 1801 census was carried out at Whitehall, in offices in The Cockpit by St James's Park, by a team of clerks, working under Rickman, before being printed in two volumes by the parliamentary printer, Luke Hansard. It had taken just over a year for the complete results to be published, by which time the crisis in grain supply was over and prices had fallen. The total cost of collecting and analysing the data came in at less than £6,000.

As the government only wanted a headcount, and not individual details, householder registration forms were not issued to enumerators. Enumerators often made unofficial notes to assist in producing their area report, with differing levels of detail. Some drew up lists that noted the head of household and gave figures in columns opposite their name to say how many were in the family and the work they did. Others made listings of their local area on a level of detail equal to or greater than the 1841 and 1851 censuses, including names, family groups and relationships, ages, dates of birth, and population movements between parishes. The census legislation stipulated that overseers should hand over any such lists drawn up during the enumeration to the churchwardens for safe-keeping. Where this was complied with, these detailed census records were kept in a variety of record sets, such as parish registers of baptisms, marriages, and burials, or the accounts books of the overseers or churchwardens. These record sets, where they survive, are often now publicly available in local record offices and libraries and/or online, though others may exist in private hands.

== Subsequent censuses ==
The censuses held in 1811, 1821, and 1831 were based on the same model as the 1801 census. With the passing of the Population Act 1840, a new approach to censuses was adopted under the responsibility of the Registrar General and was first implemented in the 1841 census.

== Results ==
=== Population by nation ===
Nation	Population	%
England	8,331,434	76.14%
Scotland	1,599,068	14.61%
Wales	541,546	4.95%
Total (excl. other)	10,472,048	95.7%
British Armed Forces	324,630	2.97%
British Merchant Navy	144,558	1.32%
Convicts onboard prison hulks	1,410	0.01%
Total (incl. other)	10,942,646	100.0%

=== Other findings ===
- There were more women than men in the country, but not by a large amount: the imbalance was due to the numbers of men serving abroad;
- The population lived in 1.8 million houses: an average of six per house;
- 2 million people worked in agriculture;
- 2 million worked in making or selling things, which ranged from handicrafts to factory work;
- There were more baptisms than burials;
- There were an increasing number of marriages in the second half of the 18th century;
- The population was increasing, not declining.

The system of recording occupations, by classifying numbers of males and females employed either in agriculture, in trade/manufactures/handicrafts, and the number not employed by either, reportedly generated some confusion, as enumerators incorrectly classified many women, children, and servants in the category of 'neither'. The 1811 and 1821 censuses would refine their format in attempts to minimise these errors.

Preceded by 1086	UK census 1801	Succeeded by 1811
