= 1811 in the United Kingdom =

Events from the year 1811 in the United Kingdom. This is a census year and the start of the British Regency.

== Incumbents ==
- Monarch – George III
- Regent – George, Prince Regent (starting 5 February)
- Prime Minister – Spencer Perceval (Tory)
- Foreign Secretary – Richard Wellesley, 1st Marquess Wellesley
- Home Secretary – Richard Ryder
- Secretary of War – Earl of Liverpool

== Events ==
- 1 February – Bell Rock Lighthouse begins operation off the coast of Scotland.
- 5 February – George, Prince of Wales becomes Regent under terms of the Regency Act because of the perceived insanity of his father, King George III. He is known as the prince regent and this is the beginning of the Regency period.
- 21 February – The John and Jane, carrying troops bound for the Peninsular War, is accidentally run down and sunk by HMS Franchise off Lizard Point, Cornwall with the loss of a majority of the 300 on board.
- 22 February – Editor Leigh Hunt and his publisher brother John, defended by Henry Brougham, are cleared of seditious libel over a September 1810 article in their newspaper, The Examiner, criticising flogging in the Army.
- 13 March – Battle of Lissa: British fleet defeats the French.
- 25–27 March – Battle of Anholt: British naval forces defeat those of Denmark.
- 4 April – Huddersfield Narrow Canal completed by opening of Standedge Tunnel under the Pennines, the longest (5,413 yards (4,950 m)), deepest and highest canal tunnel in Britain.
- 27 May – The second national census reveals that the population of England and Wales has increased in ten years by over a million to 10.1 million.
- 10 June – A volcanic eruption, observed from Royal Navy sloop HMS Sabrina (1806), creates Sabrina Island (Azores) which on 4 July is claimed for Britain; a few months later it sinks beneath the sea.
- 18 June – The Welsh Calvinistic Methodists leave the established Church of England by ordaining their own ministers in Bala, North Wales.
- 19 June – The Carlton House Fête is held at Carlton House in London. A costly and extravagant event it celebrated the beginning of the Regency era.
- 8 September – The first known landing on Rockall is made by a party from HMS Endymion.
- 16 October – National Society for Promoting the Education of the Poor in the Principles of the Established Church in England and Wales established by the Church of England to promote a system of National Schools.
- November – Luddite uprisings begin in Northern England and Midlands.
- 4 December – Royal Navy frigate HMS Saldanha (1809) is driven in a gale onto rocks in Lough Swilly in Ireland with no survivors from the estimated 253 aboard.
- 7–19 December – Ratcliff Highway murders in London.
- 24 December – Christmas Eve storm in the North Sea leads to wreck of HMS St George, Defence and Fancy off Jutland; and HMS Hero and the transport Archimedes off Texel with the loss of nearly 2,000 men.

=== Ongoing ===
- Napoleonic Wars, 1803–1815
- Anglo-Russian War, 1807–1812
- Anglo-Swedish War 1810–1812
- Peninsular War, 1808–1814

=== Undated ===
- Highland Clearances: The Marquess and Marchioness of Stafford begin mass expulsion of crofting tenants from their Highland estates to make way for sheep farming.
- Building of Regent Street begins John Nash's development of the West End of London.
- The first complete ichthyosaur fossil is found by Mary Anning at Lyme Regis.

== Publications ==
- Jane Austen's novel Sense and Sensibility ('by a lady').
- Francis Place's Illustrations and Proofs of the Principles of Population, including an examination of the proposed remedies of Mr. Malthus, and a reply to the objections of Mr. Godwin and others, the first significant text in English to advocate contraception.

== Births ==
- 9 January – Gilbert Abbott à Beckett, writer (died 1856)
- 1 February – Arthur Hallam, poet (died 1833)
- 6 February – Henry Liddell, academic and cleric (died 1898)
- 24 February – Edward Dickinson Baker, United States Senator from Oregon from 1860 (died 1861 in the United States)
- 21 March – Nathaniel Woodard, educationalist (died 1891)
- 7 June – James Simpson, Scottish obstetrician and pioneer of anaesthesia (died 1870)
- 13 June – Owen Stanley, Royal Navy officer (died 1850)
- 11 July – William Robert Grove, Welsh chemist, inventor (died 1896)
- 13 July
  - George Gilbert Scott, architect (died 1878)
  - James "paraffin" Young, Scottish chemist (died 1883)
- 18 July – William Makepeace Thackeray, novelist (died 1863)
- 14 September – William Budd, physician and epidemiologist (died 1880)
- 31 October – William Loring, admiral (died 1895)
- 8 November – John Tarleton, admiral (died 1880)
- 21 December – Archibald Campbell Tait, Archbishop of Canterbury (died 1882)

== Deaths ==
- 9 February – Nevil Maskelyne, Astronomer Royal (born 1732)
- 24 February – James Brudenell, 5th Earl of Cardigan, politician (born 1715)
- 14 March – Augustus FitzRoy, 3rd Duke of Grafton, Prime Minister of Great Britain (born 1735)
- 4 April – Mary Woffington, Irish socialite (b. 1729)
- 5 May – Robert Mylne, architect (born 1734)
- 7 May – Richard Cumberland, dramatist (born 1732)
- 28 May – Henry Dundas, 1st Viscount Melville, Scottish politician, Home Secretary for Great Britain (born 1742)
- 29 July – William Cavendish, 5th Duke of Devonshire (born 1748)
- 30 September – Thomas Percy, poet, ballad collector and bishop (born 1729)
- 15 October – Sir Nathaniel Dance-Holland, portrait painter and politician (born 1735)
- 27 November – Andrew Meikle, Scottish mechanical engineer (born 1719)
- 21 December – Sir Peter Parker, 1st Baronet, Admiral of the Fleet (born 1721 in Ireland)
- 31 December – Benjamin Vulliamy, clockmaker (born 1747)
