= List of United Kingdom censuses =

The census in the United Kingdom is decennial, that is, held every ten years, although there is provision in the Census Act 1920 for a census to take place at intervals of five years or more. There are actually three separate censuses in the United Kingdom – in England and Wales, Scotland, and Northern Ireland – although they are often co-ordinated. From 1821 to 1911, the census included the whole of Ireland.

There have only been three occasions in Great Britain where the census has not been decennial: There was no census in 1941 owing to the Second World War; a mini-census using a ten per cent sample of the population was conducted on 24 April 1966; and the planned Scottish 2021 census was delayed to 2022 owing to the impact of the COVID-19 pandemic. No census was held in Ireland in 1921, as a consequence of the Irish War of Independence; instead, Northern Ireland carried out a census in 1926, the first there for fifteen years. (Note: The Irish Free State's first census was also carried out in 1926.) No census was carried out in Northern Ireland in 1931, but one was carried out in 1937.

== Past censuses ==
=== Published censuses ===
The census records which have been published relate to the occupants of each household, as enumerated for the dates given below:

- 1801 United Kingdom census – Tuesday, 10 March
- 1811 United Kingdom census – Monday, 27 May
- 1821 United Kingdom census – Monday, 28 May
- 1831 United Kingdom census – Monday, 30 May
- 1841 United Kingdom census – Sunday, 6 June
- 1851 United Kingdom census – Sunday, 30 March
- 1861 United Kingdom census – Sunday, 7 April
- 1871 United Kingdom census – Sunday, 2 April
- 1881 United Kingdom census – Sunday, 3 April
- 1891 United Kingdom census – Sunday, 5 April
- 1901 United Kingdom census – Sunday, 31 March
- 1911 United Kingdom census – Sunday, 2 April
- 1921 United Kingdom census – Sunday, 19 June
- National Registration Act 1939 – Friday, 29 September Second World War

=== Unpublished censuses ===
Under the 100-year closure rule established after the 1911 census was taken, only summary results for censuses after 1939 – though with significant statistical detail – are published in the months (Note: With larger population and more detailed questionnaires, as well as more granular results, publication dates are spread over a number of months. For the census applicable to enumeration on 21 March 2021, the first results for England and Wales were not published until 28 June 2022, and the last set of results is provisionally (as of May 2023) predicted to be published in October or November 2023.) following the enumeration dates given below; the full information (individual household entries) in later censuses will not be released until the dates stated, a century after each later census was conducted.

- 1926 Northern Ireland Census – Sunday, 18 April: The census returns were not transferred to the Public Record Office in Northern Ireland, and are believed to have been destroyed without authorisation, possibly as part of a World War II waste-paper campaign.
- 1931 United Kingdom census – Sunday, 26 April: carried out in England, Wales, and Scotland, but not Northern Ireland. The England and Wales census returns were destroyed in an accidental fire in 1942; the Scottish census returns were stored in Edinburgh, and survived. The scheduled publication date for the Scottish returns is 1 January 2032
- 1937 Northern Ireland Census – Sunday, 28 February: Unlike the 1926 Northern Ireland census, the 1937 census records survive. (scheduled publication date 1 January 2038)
- ~~1941 United Kingdom Census~~ – no census taken owing to World War II
- 1951 United Kingdom census – Sunday, 8 April (scheduled publication date 1 January 2052)
- 1961 United Kingdom census – Sunday, 23 April (scheduled publication date 1 January 2062)
- 1966 United Kingdom census – Sunday, 24 April mini-census using a ten per cent sample (scheduled publication date 1 January 2067)
- 1971 United Kingdom census – Sunday, 25 April (scheduled publication date 1 January 2072)
- 1981 United Kingdom census – Sunday, 5 April (scheduled publication date 1 January 2082)
- 1991 United Kingdom census – Sunday, 21 April (scheduled publication date 1 January 2092)
- 2001 United Kingdom census – Sunday, 29 April (scheduled publication date 1 January 2102)
- 2011 United Kingdom census – Sunday, 27 March (scheduled publication date 1 January 2112)
- 2021–2022 United Kingdom censuses – carried out in England, Wales, and Northern Ireland only on Sunday, 21 March 2021 (scheduled publication date 1 January 2122). The census in Scotland was carried out on 20 March 2022 (scheduled publication date 1 January 2123).

== See also ==
- 1911 census of Ireland
