= List of counties of Wales by area in 1831 =

This is a list of the historic counties of Wales as recorded by the 1831 United Kingdom census, ordered by their area.

| Rank | County | Area (acres) |
|---|---|---|
| 1 | Carmarthenshire | 606,331 |
| 2 | Glamorgan | 547,494 |
| 3 | Montgomeryshire | 483,323 |
| 4 | Brecknockshire | 460,158 |
| 5 | Cardiganshire | 443,387 |
| 6 | Pembrokeshire | 401,691 |
| 7 | Denbighshire | 386,052 |
| 8 | Merionethshire | 385,291 |
| 9 | Caernarfonshire | 370,273 |
| 10 | Monmouthshire | 324,310 |
| 11 | Radnorshire | 272,128 |
| 12 | Anglesey | 193,453 |
| 13 | Flintshire | 184,905 |
