= 1966 United Kingdom census =

Census of the population of the United Kingdom

Census 1966
- 24 April 1966

General information
- Country: United Kingdom

The United Kingdom Census 1966 was a census of the United Kingdom of Great Britain and Northern Ireland carried out on 24 April 1966. It was the first to ask about car ownership and method of travel to work. It trialled an alternative method of enumeration and was the first where the results were released on electronic media. It was also carried out five years earlier than normal, midway between the 1961 and 1971 censuses.

== Release ==
The census is expected to be released to the public in 2067.

== See also ==
- Census in the United Kingdom
- List of United Kingdom censuses

Preceded by 1961	UK census 1966	Succeeded by 1971
