= Census Act 1800 =

Act of the Parliament of Great Britain

- Act of Parliament
- Parliament of Great Britain
- Long title: An Act for taking an Account of the Population of Great Britain, and of the Increase or Diminution thereof.
- Citation: 41 Geo. 3. (G.B.) c. 15
- Territorial extent: Great Britain

Dates
- Royal assent: 31 December 1800
- Commencement: 31 December 1800 (Note: The Acts of Parliament (Commencement) Act 1793.)
- Repealed: 21 August 1871
Other legislation
Repealed by	Statute Law Revision Act 1871

Status: Repealed

Text of statute as originally enacted

The Census Act 1800 – also known as the Population Act 1800 – (41 Geo. 3. (G.B.) c. 15) was an act of the Parliament of Great Britain which enabled the first Census of England, Scotland and Wales, the 1801 United Kingdom census to be undertaken. The census was carried out in 1801 and has been repeated almost every ten years thereafter. The 1801 census estimated the population of England and Wales to be 8.9 million, and that of Scotland was 1.6 million. Ireland was not included in the census until 1821.

The first census of England had been carried out by William I and published in the Domesday Book in 1086. Various other censuses had taken place, such as that in the sixteenth century, in which bishops were asked to count the communicants or number of families in their dioceses. In the latter part of the eighteenth century, there were several proposals for a Census Bill and a growing concern about the population of Britain and its demand for food, particularly fuelled by the publication in 1798 of Thomas Robert Malthus's An Essay on the Principle of Population. The Census Bill was presented to Parliament on 20 November 1800, passed on 3 December and received royal assent on 31 December. The first census was held on Tuesday 10 March 1801.
