= Census in the United Kingdom =

Mass population survey conducted in the United Kingdom

Form used to poll English households during the 2001 Census

Coincident full censuses have taken place in the different jurisdictions of the United Kingdom every ten years since 1801, with the exceptions of 1941 (during the Second World War), Ireland in 1921/Northern Ireland in 1931, and Scotland in 2021. In addition to providing detailed information about national demographics, the results of the census play an important part in the calculation of resource allocation to regional and local service providers by the UK government.

The most recent census took place in England, Wales and Northern Ireland on 21 March 2021. Because of the COVID-19 pandemic, the census in Scotland was delayed to 20 March 2022.

Censuses in the United Kingdom are done by three separate bodies, the Office for National Statistics for England and Wales, the National Records of Scotland for Scotland, and the Northern Ireland Statistics and Research Agency for Northern Ireland.

== History ==
Tax assessments (known in the later Empire as the indiction) were made in Britain in Roman times, but detailed records have not survived. In the 7th century AD, Dál Riata (parts of what is now Scotland and Northern Ireland) conducted a census, called the "Tradition of the Men of Alba" (Scottish Gaelic: Senchus fer n-Alban). The first census in England was the Domesday Book, compiled in 1086 under William the Conqueror for tax purposes.

Distinct from earlier, less inclusive censuses (e.g. for religious purposes), national decennial censuses of the general population started in 1801, championed by the statistician John Rickman. The censuses were initially conducted partly to ascertain the number of men able to fight in the Napoleonic Wars, and partly over population concerns stemming from the 1798 work An Essay on the Principle of Population by Reverend Thomas Robert Malthus. Rickman's twelve reasons – set out in 1798 and repeated in parliamentary debates – for conducting a census of Great Britain included the following justifications:

- "the intimate knowledge of any country must form the rational basis of legislation and diplomacy"
- "an industrious population is the basic power and resource of any nation, and therefore its size needs to be known"
- "the number of men who were required for conscription to the militia in different areas should reflect the area's population"
- "there were defence reasons for wanting to know the number of seamen"
- "the need to plan the production of corn and thus to know the number of people who had to be fed"
- "a census would indicate the Government's intention to promote the public good", and
- "the life insurance industry would be stimulated by the results".

Regular national censuses have taken place every ten years since 1801, most recently in 2021; other partial censuses have been made on some of the intervening fifth anniversaries. The first four censuses (1801–1831) were mainly statistical: that is, mainly headcounts, with virtually no personal information. A small number of older records exist in local record offices as by-products of the notes made by enumerators in the production of those earlier censuses; these might list all persons or just the heads of households. The 1841 Census was the first to intentionally record names of all individuals in a household or institution.

The first simultaneous census of the British Empire, covering the United Kingdom, India and the Crown Settlements, took place in 1881.

The Census Act 1920 provides the legal framework for conducting all censuses in Great Britain (Scotland, England, and Wales). The primary legislation for Northern Ireland was introduced in 1969. Before this legislation, it was necessary to have a separate act of parliament for each census. Britain was also responsible for initiating and co-ordinating censuses in many of its overseas colonies.

Because of the disruption caused by the Second World War, there was no census in 1941. However, following the passage into law on 5 September 1939 of the National Registration Act 1939, a population count was carried out on 29 September 1939. The resulting National Register was later used to develop the National Health Service Central Register. Censuses were taken on 26 April 1931 in Great Britain, but the returns for England and Wales were destroyed in an accidental fire during the Second World War.

On 24 April 1966, the UK trialled an alternative method of enumeration – long form/short form. Every household was given a short form to complete, while a sample of the population was given a long form to collect more detailed information. The short form was used for the population count and to collect basic information such as usual address, sex, age and relationships to other household members. This was the first and only time that a five-yearly census was carried out in the UK.

The 1971 and 1981 census in Northern Ireland were boycotted by some Irish Republicans, with the 1981 census happening at the same time as the 1981 hunger strike.

On behalf of the Government, the UK Statistics Authority initiated a research programme, called Beyond 2011, to investigate a range of alternative options to conducting a UK-wide census in 2021. Following agreement to the recommendations in January 2015, the UK Statistics Authority formally closed the Beyond 2011 Programme. It was replaced by the Census Transformation Programme which has the purpose of taking forward and implementing the vision and recommended approaches.

== Release of information ==
=== England and Wales ===
The British government undertakes the census for policy and planning purposes, and publishes the results in printed reports and on the website of the Office for National Statistics (ONS). A number of datasets are also made available. Public access to individual census returns in England and Wales is normally restricted under the terms of the 100-year rule (Lord Chancellor's Instrument no.12, issued in 1966 under S.5 (1) of the Public Records Act 1958).

=== Scotland ===
National censuses in Scotland have been taken on the same dates as those in England and Wales, but with differing legislation, governorship and archiving arrangements. The 2001 census was the first to be taken under full domestic control, while all preceding censuses since 1861 had been under the control of the Registrar General for Scotland. The 19th-century Scottish censuses were all released after 50–80 years of closure, while the 1901 and 1911 censuses were made available to the public after their 100th anniversaries. Unlike the censuses for England and Wales, there was a statutory bar on early release of the 1911 census details.

The census that had been due in 2021 was delayed until March 2022, with the COVID-19 pandemic cited as the reason. This was the first time since 1941 that the census count had been delayed. The return rate of the 2022 census was lower than expected, leading to plans to extend the deadline. There were concerns the data collected would be statistically invalid.

=== Ireland and Northern Ireland ===
Irish censuses from before 1901 have not generally survived to the present day, due to a combination of official incompetence (the 1881 and 1891 returns were pulped before they could be transcribed into books), non-retention (1861 and 1871), and a fire during the Irish Civil War in 1922. The 1901 and 1911 censuses for Ireland (all of which was then part of the UK) have been available for inspection since 1960 – they were made available earlier than the other British records, since Irish law is different on this matter. No census was taken in 1921 due to the disruption of the Irish War of Independence. The first census taken in the Irish Free State (now the Republic of Ireland) was in April 1926; the first Northern Ireland census occurred at the same time. No census took place in Northern Ireland in 1931, but one took place there in 1937.

== Coverage ==
In 2001, the census form was completed by 94 per cent of the population in England and Wales, with a further 4 per cent identified by the census enumerators, though the results still represented 100 per cent of the population through the use of cross-matching with a follow-up survey. The Census Act 1920 (as amended) legislates a fine of up to £1,000 for those who refuse to complete their census forms.

In some censuses, significant numbers of people intentionally did not participate for political reasons. In 1911, the Women's Freedom League, a suffragette organisation campaigning for female suffrage in the United Kingdom, organised a boycott of the census. They encouraged women to go to all-night parties or to stay at friends' houses to avoid the census and some heads of households refused to report the women at the address. In 1991, many people again avoided the census, which was conducted during the time of the poll tax debate, in case the government used it to enforce the tax. It was estimated that up to one million people were not counted by the 1991 census due to such evasion.

== Criminal law ==
Under section 8 of the Census Act 1920, whoever refuses or neglects to comply with the census, makes a false declaration, makes, signs, or delivers a false document, or causes the same, or refuses to answer, or gives false answers, shall be liable on summary conviction and face a maximum fine of £1,000. Exceptions exist for refusing or neglecting to respond to questions about religion, as stipulated by the Census (Amendment) Act 2000.

== Data sets ==
Traditionally, outputs are released in the form of tables of counts at various levels of geography. However, microdata, known Samples of Anonymised Records (SARs) are UK data-sets consisting of samples of individual records from national censuses. These very large datasets resemble survey data and are used for a range of applications by social scientists and policymakers.

The first SAR was released in 1991. In 2001, the SAR system was extended, and it is anticipated that there will be SAR files from the 2011 census.

=== 2001 ===
The 1851 census included a question about religion on a separate response sheet, whose completion was not compulsory. However, the 2001 census was the first in which the government asked about religion on the main census form. New legislation was enacted through the Census (Amendment) Act 2000 to allow the question to be asked, and to make its response optional. Perhaps encouraged by a chain letter that started in New Zealand, 390,000 people entered their religion as "Jedi Knight", with some areas registering up to 2.6% of people as Jedi. Thus, "Jedi" was the fourth-largest reported religion in the country. (See: Jedi census phenomenon).

=== 2011 ===
The 2011 national census took place on 27 March 2011. Several identity and status questions were included for the first time in the census, including questions relating to civil partnerships. The first set of data to be released from this census (basic counts of population by age and sex) was made available in July 2012, with the remainder of the tables following thereafter.

=== 2021–2022 ===
The 2021 national census took place on 21 March 2021 in England, Wales and Northern Ireland. There was not one census covering the whole UK at the same time in 2021 as the census in Scotland was postponed to 2022, due to the COVID-19 pandemic.

== List of UK censuses ==
Year	Date	Notes	New questions asked
1801	10 March	The pre-1841 censuses were simply headcounts. The data was collected on pre-printed forms which were destroyed after the details had been extracted and published in official census reports. There was no requirement to record details of individuals but some local officials took it upon themselves to do so. Some of these unofficial lists have survived and can be found in local record offices.	
1811	27 May	The pre-1841 censuses were simply headcounts. The data was collected on pre-printed forms which were destroyed after the details had been extracted and published in official census reports. There was no requirement to record details of individuals but some local officials took it upon themselves to do so. Some of these unofficial lists have survived and can be found in local record offices.	
1821	28 May	The pre-1841 censuses were simply headcounts. The data was collected on pre-printed forms which were destroyed after the details had been extracted and published in official census reports. There was no requirement to record details of individuals but some local officials took it upon themselves to do so. Some of these unofficial lists have survived and can be found in local record offices.	
1831	30 May	The pre-1841 censuses were simply headcounts. The data was collected on pre-printed forms which were destroyed after the details had been extracted and published in official census reports. There was no requirement to record details of individuals but some local officials took it upon themselves to do so. Some of these unofficial lists have survived and can be found in local record offices.	
1841	6 June		Name. Age (for those over 15, this was supposed to be rounded down to the nearest 5 years, though this instruction was not obeyed in all cases). Occupation. Whether born in same county recorded as "Yes" or "No" of resident county and if no whether born in Scotland, Ireland or Foreign Parts would be indicated by an 'S', 'I' or 'F' as appropriate. Religion (Ireland).
1851	30 March		Relation to head of the household. Marital status. Place of birth. Whether blind, deaf or dumb. Language spoken (Ireland). Rounding down of ages dropped.
1861	7 April		
1871	2 April		Economic status. Whether an imbecile, idiot or lunatic
1881	3 April		Language spoken (in Scotland).
1891	5 April		Language spoken (in Wales). Whether an employer, an employee, or neither. Number of rooms occupied, if fewer than 5.
1901	31 March		Number of rooms in dwelling. Whether an employer, worker or working on one's own account. Whether working at home or not. Language spoken (in Wales – children under three years of age excluded).
1911	2 April		First UK Census where the Census Return for a particular household or institution written directly by the "Head of Household" was used as the primary census return. Industry or service with which the worker is connected. How long the couple has been married. How many children were born alive, how many who are still alive, and how many who have died. "Nationality of any Person born in a Foreign Country". The final column, which had been "Deaf and Dumb, Blind, Lunatic, Imbecile, Feeble-minded", becomes "INFIRMITY: Totally Deaf and Dumb, Totally Blind, Lunatic, Imbecile, Feeble-minded".
1921	19 June	Ireland - no census; a Northern Ireland census was held in 1926 instead.	Place of work and industry Whether a marriage has been dissolved by divorce.
1931	26 April	England and Wales – documents destroyed in 1942 fire; Scotland - documents survive. Northern Ireland – no census; a Northern Ireland census was held in 1937 instead.	Place of usual residence
1939	29 September	National Registration Act 1939.	Includes every civilian member of household, their full birth date, full name and occupation.
1941		No census due to the Second World War.	
1951	8 April		Household amenities.
1961	23 April	The first time a computer was used - an IBM 705 at the Royal Army Pay Corps, Worthy Down, Winchester, England .	Qualifications, migration, household tenure.
1966	24 April	Long-form/short-form census, trialling an alternative method of enumeration.	Car ownership, method of travel to work.
1971	25 April		
1981	5 April		
1991	21 April		Ethnic group, long-term limiting illness, central heating, term-time address of students.
2001	29 April		Size of workforce, supervisor status, first question on religion on the main census form (England, Wales, and Scotland).
2011	27 March	An option to complete the form online. Also provided English, Northern Irish, Scottish, Welsh and British national identity option following criticism that English and Welsh were absent from 2001.	Includes questions relevant to civil partnerships. Other new questions involve asking migrants their date of arrival and how long they intend to stay in the UK; respondents also required to disclose which passports they held. A rehearsal census was conducted on 11 October 2009.
2021 (England, Wales, Northern Ireland)	21 March	'First digital-first census' with the aim of most completions being done online.	Question asking whether respondents have previously been in the armed forces (not asked in Northern Ireland); voluntary questions for those aged 16 and over about respondents' gender identity (England and Wales only), separate from the compulsory question about respondents' sex, and sexual orientation. A rehearsal was conducted between September and December 2019.
2022 (Scotland)	20 March	Originally, it was scheduled for 2021 alongside England, Wales and Northern Ireland, but the census in Scotland was postponed to March 2022 due to the COVID-19 pandemic.	

== See also ==
- Census Enumerators' Books
- Census of Ireland, 1911
- Citizen Information Project
- Demographics of the United Kingdom
- Jedi census phenomenon
- List of United Kingdom censuses
- Census (Amendment) (Scotland) Act 2019
- Domesday Book
