= The Blandford School =

Location
- Milldown Road; Blandford Forum, Dorset, DT11 7SQ; England
- Coordinates: 50.86133°N 2.17002°W

Information
- Type: Voluntary controlled school
- Local authority: Dorset
- Department for Education URN: 113888 Tables
- Ofsted: Reports
- Headteacher: Alan Jones
- Gender: Coeducational
- Age: 11 to 18
- Website: http://www.blandfordschool.org.uk/

The Blandford School is a coeducational secondary school located in Blandford Forum in the English county of Dorset.

It is a voluntary controlled school administered by Dorset County Council. Previously an upper school, education in the local area was reorganised in 2005 and the school expanded its age range to pupils aged 11. The school also has the Rights Respecting Schools Award.

The Blandford School offers GCSEs, BTECs and OCR Nationals as programmes of study for pupils, while students in the sixth form have the option to study from a range of A Levels, Cambridge Technicals and further BTECs.
