= 1821 United Kingdom census =

Census of the population of the United Kingdom

1821 United Kingdom Census
- 28 May 1821
- Map of the United Kingdom (1826)

General information
- Country: United Kingdom

Results
- Total population: 20,873,358 (▲18%)
- Most populous Cities: London (1,450,122)

The United Kingdom Census of 1821 was the third decennial census in the United Kingdom, that recorded the population on the night of 28 May 1821. It was first decennial census to include Ireland. Within each parish or township, it recorded:

- Number of inhabited houses.
- Number of families.
- Number of houses being built.
- Number of uninhabited houses.
- Number of families employed in agriculture.
- Number of families employed in trade, manufacturers or handicraft.
- Number of families not employed in either.
- Number of males.
- Number of females.
- Total number of persons.
- Detailed breakdown of other employment for males aged over 20.

In addition to this, the census recorded the ages of the population within bands of 5 and then 1O years; this revealed that almost half the population was under 20. In Ireland, the records were collected inconsistently and many enumerators created biased records believing they would be paid more. Indexes of parish records were collected along side the census.

== Results ==
The individual results were collected and compiled into index books sorted by parishes or townships; after this, only the enumeration books were kept. Nationally it was found that one third of families were employed in agriculture, just under half in trade, manufacture or commerce.

== Regional populations ==
| Country | Population (1821) | Area (km²) | Density (km^{2}) | Percentage of total population (%) |
|---|---|---|---|---|
| England and Wales | 11,978,075 | 151,058 | 79 | 57.4% |
| Ireland | 6,801,827 | 84,421 | 81 | 32.59% |
| Scotland | 2,093,456 | 77,933 | 27 | 10.1% |
| United Kingdom | 20,873,358 | 315,093 | 76 | 100% |

== See also ==
- Census in the United Kingdom
- List of United Kingdom censuses

| Preceded by 1811 | UK census 1821 | Succeeded by 1831 |
