= 1811 United Kingdom census =

Census of the population of the United Kingdom

1811 United Kingdom Census
- 27 May 1811
- Map of the United Kingdom (1813)

General information
- Country: United Kingdom

Results
- Total population: 12,609,864 (▲14%)
- Most populous Cities: London (1,303,564)

The United Kingdom Census of 1811 was the second decennial census in the United Kingdom, that recorded the population on the night of 27 May 1811; it did not include Ireland. Within each parish or township, it recorded:

- Number of inhabited houses.
- Number of families.
- Number of houses being built.
- Number of uninhabited houses.
- Number of families employed in agriculture.
- Number of families employed in trade, manufacturers or handicraft.
- Number of families not employed in either.
- Number of males.
- Number of females.
- Total number of persons.
- Detailed breakdown of other employment for males aged over 20.

Indexes of parish records were collected along side the census.

== Results ==
The individual results were collected and compiled into index books sorted by parishes or townships; after this, only the enumeration books were kept. Nationally it was found that one third of families were employed in agriculture, just under half in trade, manufacture or commerce.

== Regional populations ==
Country	Population (1811)	Area (km²)	Density (km^{2})	Percentage of total population (%)
England and Wales	10,163,676	151,058	67	80.6%
Scotland	1,805,688	77,933	23	14.3%
United Kingdom	12,609,864	228,991	55	100%

== See also ==
- Census in the United Kingdom
- List of United Kingdom censuses

Preceded by 1801	UK census 1811	Succeeded by 1821

1811 Census May 1811 UK
