= John Rickman (parliamentary official) =

English government official and statistician

John Rickman FRS
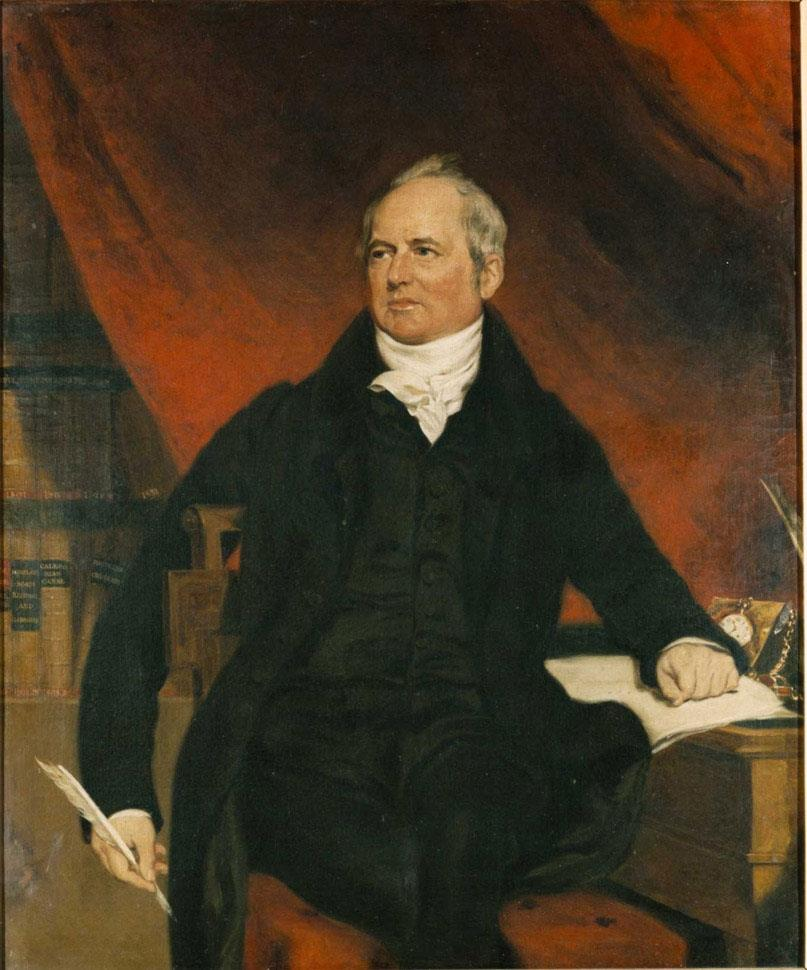
- Born: 22 August 1771
- Died: 11 August 1840 (aged 68)
- Education: Guildford Grammar School, Magdalen Hall, Oxford, & Lincoln College, Oxford.
- Known for: Creating the United Kingdom census

John Rickman FRS (22 August 1771 – 11 August 1840) was an English government official and statistician of the early nineteenth century.

== Early life ==
He was born in Newburn, Northumberland, son of the Rev Thomas Rickman, and educated at Guildford Grammar School, Magdalen Hall, Oxford, and Lincoln College, Oxford. The poet Robert Southey was one of his friends.

== Career ==
From 1799 to 1801 he edited the Commercial, Agricultural, and Manufactures' Magazine which published his article "On ascertaining the population" in 1800. An earlier version of this paper was entitled "Thoughts on the Utility and Facility of a general enumeration of the People of the British Empire". Rickman, was living at Burton in Christchurch, in 1792, when he first published ‘Thoughts on the Utility and Facility . . . etc’. It was Christchurch’s MP George Rose who raised this in Parliament with Charles Abbot MP (later Lord Colchester), leading in 1800 to the Bill ‘An Act for taking an Account of the Population of Great Britain’. Shortly after, in 1800, Abbot appointed Rickman his Private Secretary.

Rickman is credited with drafting the first bill which became the 1800 Census Act, the full title of which was An Act for taking an Account of the Population of Great Britain, and of the Increase or Diminution thereof, which became law in December 1800. Rickman was instrumental in carrying out the first four censuses of Great Britain, including not only a population count, but also the collection and analysis of parish register returns.

Following Abbot's election to the post of Speaker of the House of Commons in February 1802, Rickman took the post of Speaker's Secretary, which he held until July 1814 when he was appointed Second Clerk Assistant at the Table of the House of Commons. In this capacity he drove through a substantial reform to the way in which the House of Commons recorded and published its daily proceedings: the Votes and Proceedings of the House of Commons were first published on 18 April 1817, replacing the Votes of the House of Commons, first published in the 1680s.

Rickman became Clerk Assistant in 1820, a post which he held to his death. It is often stated that Rickman was Clerk of the House of Commons: this was never the case.

Rickman served as Secretary to two Parliamentary Commissions established in 1803. The first for the making of roads and bridges in Scotland; the second for the construction of the Caledonian Canal through Scotland's Great Glen. The civil engineer Thomas Telford was amongst the commissioners on both these Commissions: John Rickman was a close friend of Telford, and was his executor, as well as the editor of Telford's autobiography.

Besides Rickman's work on the census, he also collected and mustered other statistics. Between 1816 and 1836 he abstracted the poor rate returns for the Poor Law Committee; later he produced returns on Education for Lord John Russell's Education Committee and in 1839 he compiled a return of Local Taxation. In April 1815 he was elected a Fellow of the Royal Society.

The subtitle to Orlo William's biography of Rickman: Lamb's Friend the Census Taker under-emphasises his extensive parliamentary work.

== Family ==
Rickman married Susannah Postlethwaite in 1805. They had three children who survived to adulthood; Anne (b 1807), Frances (b 1810) and William (b 1812). Anne acted as unofficial secretary to her father in his Parliamentary work. The family lived in a small official residence near Westminster Hall and witnessed important events in Parliament, including the fire of 1834. Anne and Frances watched debates in the House of Commons through the ventilator.

== Biography ==
- Stephen, Leslie (1896). "Rickman, John" . In Lee, Sidney (ed.). Dictionary of National Biography. Vol. 48. London: Smith, Elder & Co. pp. 264–266.
- W. C. Rickman, Biographical memoir of John Rickman, esq., F. R. S., &c. &c. (London, privately published, 1841).
- Orlo Williams, Life and Letters of John Rickman (Boston and New York: Houghton Mifflin Company, 1912).
- Parliamentary Archives, Rickman Papers
