= 1871 United Kingdom census =

Census of the population of the United Kingdom

Census 1871
- 2 April 1871
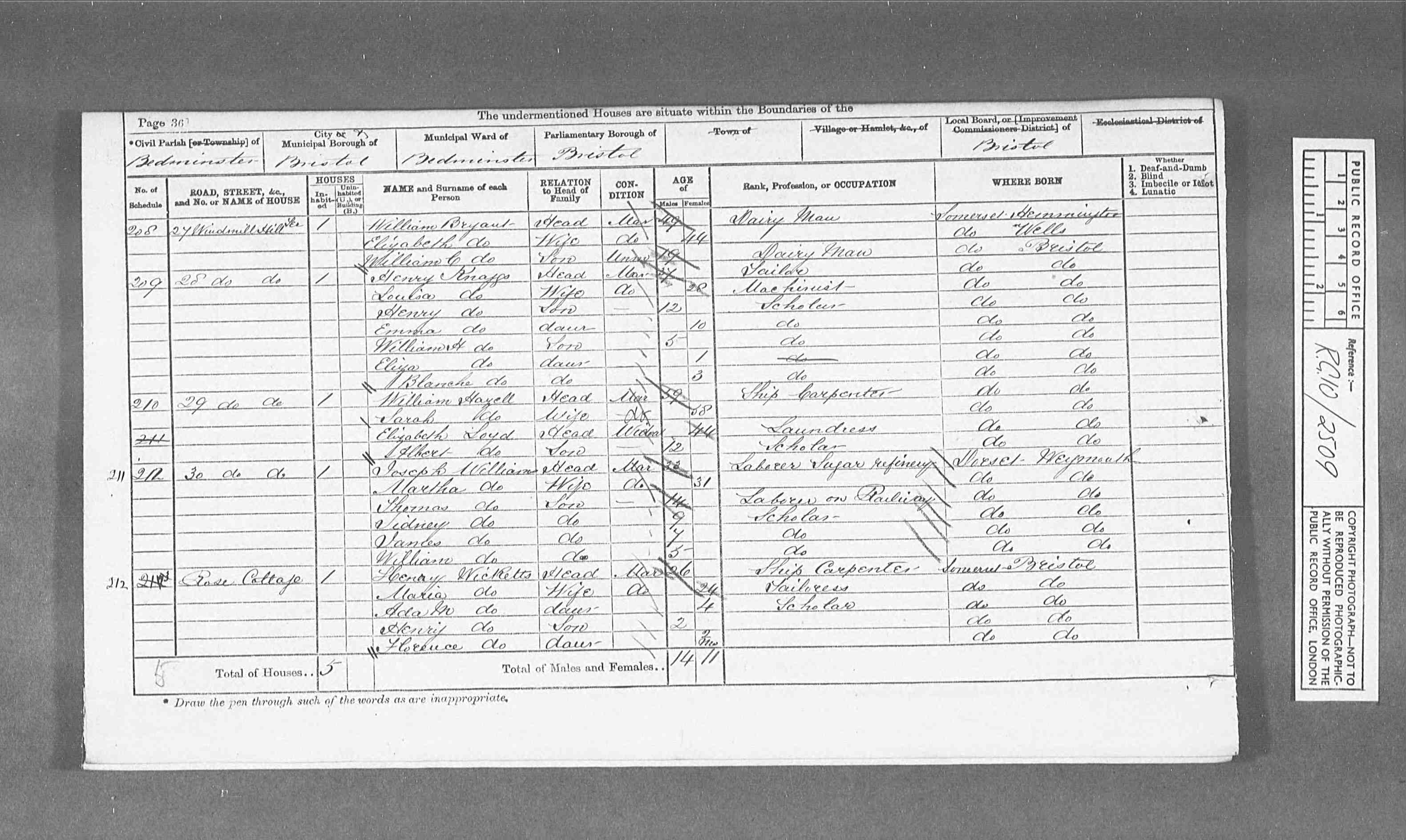

General information
- Country: United Kingdom

The United Kingdom Census 1871 was a census of the United Kingdom of Great Britain and Ireland carried out on Sunday 2 April 1871. It added the categories of "lunatic" to those recorded as infirm.

The total population of England, Wales and Scotland was recorded as 26,072,036.

== See also ==
- Census in the United Kingdom
- List of United Kingdom censuses

Preceded by 1861	UK census 1871	Succeeded by 1881
