= 1861 United Kingdom census =

Census of the population of the United Kingdom

Census 1861
- 7 April 1861

General information
- Country: United Kingdom

The United Kingdom Census of 1861 recorded the people residing in every household on the night of 7 April 1861, and was the third of the UK censuses to include details of household members. The census was taken and recorded everyone living in a household on Sunday 7 April 1861. The 1861 format of the census was identical to the previous 1851 census, despite pressures for 'religious affiliation' questions to be included. This suggestion was rejected at the time.

The total population of England, Wales and Scotland was recorded as 23,085,579.

== See also ==
- Census in the United Kingdom
- List of United Kingdom censuses

Preceded by 1851	UK census 1861	Succeeded by 1871
