= 1951 United Kingdom census =

Census of the population of the United Kingdom

Census 1951
- 8 April 1951

General information
- Country: United Kingdom

The United Kingdom Census 1951 was a census of the United Kingdom of Great Britain and Northern Ireland carried out on 8 April 1951. It was the first to ask about household amenities and the largest so far attempted in the country.

There was no census taken in 1941 due to the Second World War, but the register compiled as a result of the National Registration Act 1939, which was released into the public domain on a subscription basis in 2015 with some redactions, captures many of the same details as a census.

== Release ==
The census was conducted under the Census Act 1920 which prohibits disclosure for 100 years, this means the 1951 census is expected to be made public in January 2052. The 1951 census had been the first national census since 1931; the 1941 census effort had been abandoned due to the ongoing Second World War, and the records for England and Wales from the 1931 census were destroyed in a fire in 1942 whilst in storage. This means the release of the 1951 census will be the first census released for thirty years, the last ones being made public was that of the 1921 census released on 6 January 2022. It was also the first to have some level of small geography areas, census tracts, produced, in this case for specifically Oxford.

== See also ==
- Census in the United Kingdom
- List of United Kingdom censuses

Preceded by 1931	UK census 1951	Succeeded by 1961
