= 1891 United Kingdom census =

Census of the population of the United Kingdom

Census 1891
- 5 April 1891
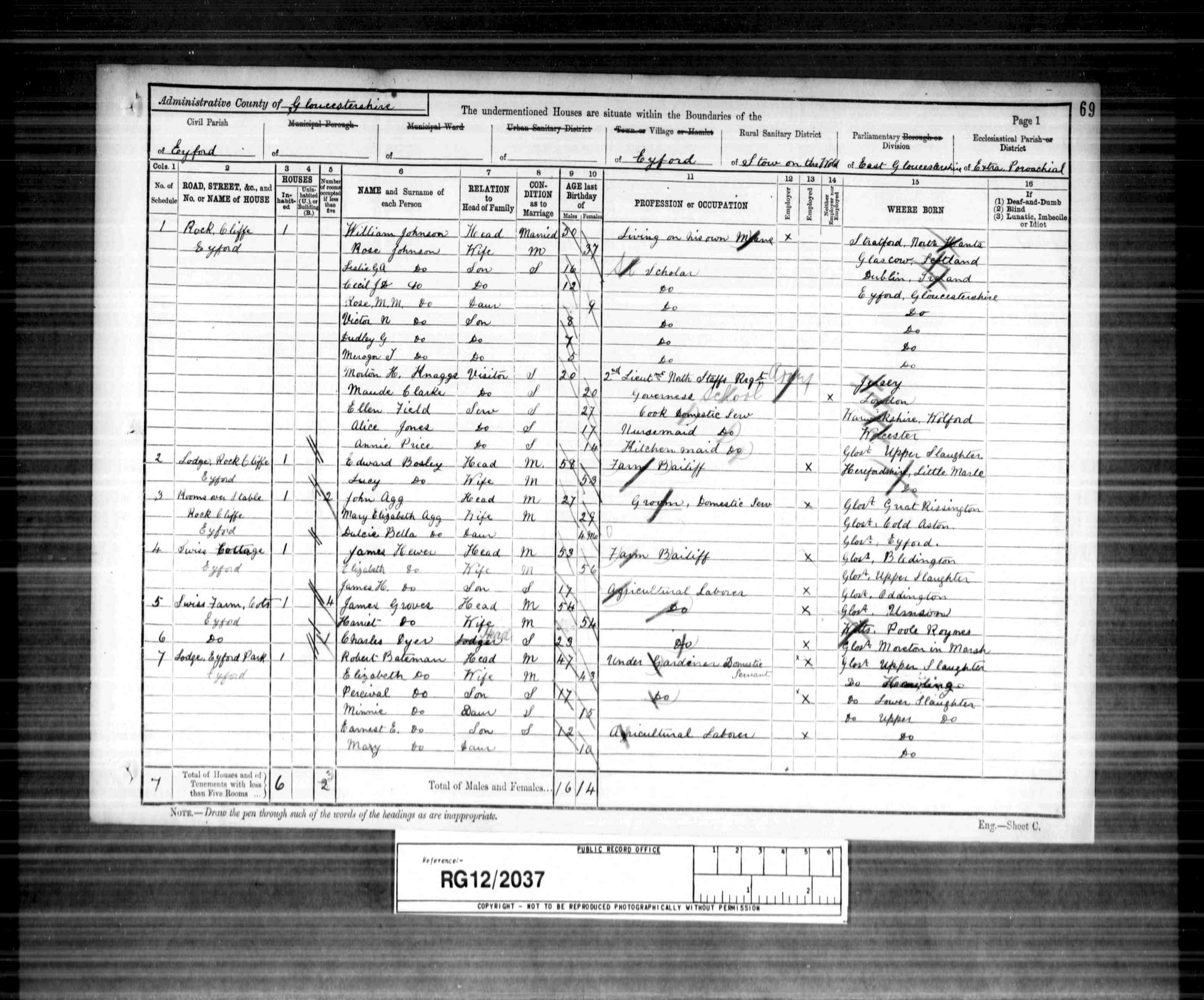

General information
- Country: United Kingdom

The United Kingdom Census 1891 was a census of the United Kingdom of Great Britain and Ireland carried out on Sunday 5 April 1891. A question was added to record the number of rooms in a household, in response to concerns about overcrowding in cities. This was also the first census to employ women census takers and the first to ask in Wales about the ability to speak the Welsh language.

The total population of England, Wales and Scotland was recorded as 33,015,701.

== See also ==
- Census in the United Kingdom
- List of United Kingdom censuses

Preceded by 1881	UK census 1891	Succeeded by 1901
