= 1831 United Kingdom census =

Census of the population of the United Kingdom

1831 United Kingdom Census
- 30 May 1831
- Map of the United Kingdom (1826)

General information
- Country: United Kingdom

Results
- Total population: 24,027,782 (▲15%)
- Most populous Cities: London (1,474,069)

The United Kingdom Census of 1831 was the fourth decennial census in the United Kingdom, that recorded the population on the night of 30 May 1831. It was second decennial census to include Ireland. Within each parish or township, it recorded:

- Number of inhabited houses.
- Number of families.
- Number of houses being built.
- Number of uninhabited houses.
- Number of families employed in agriculture.
- Number of families employed in trade, manufacturers or handicraft.
- Number of families not employed in either.
- Number of males.
- Number of females.
- Total number of persons.
- Detailed breakdown of other employment for males aged over 20.

In Ireland, the records were collected inconsistently and many enumerators created biased records believing they would be paid more. Indexes of parish records were collected along side the census.

== Results ==
The individual results were collected and compiled into index books sorted by parishes or townships; after this, only the enumeration books were kept. Nationally it was found that one third of families were employed in agriculture, just under half in trade, manufacture or commerce.

== Regional populations ==
Country	Population (1831)	Area (km²)	Density (km^{2})	Percentage of total population (%)
England and Wales	13,894,574	151,058	92	57.83%
Ireland	7,767,401	84,421	92	32.33%
Scotland	2,365,807	77,933	30	9.84%
United Kingdom	24,027,782	315,093	76	100%

== See also ==
- Census in the United Kingdom
- List of United Kingdom censuses

Preceded by 1821	UK census 1831	Succeeded by 1841
