= 1971 United Kingdom census =

Census of the population of the United Kingdom

Census 1971
- 25 April 1971

General information
- Country: United Kingdom of Great Britain and Northern Ireland
- Authority: Office of Population Censuses and Surveys
- Website: www.ons.gov.uk/census/2001censusandearlier/aquickguideto1991andearliercensuses

The United Kingdom Census 1971 was a census of the United Kingdom of Great Britain and Northern Ireland carried out on 25 April 1971. The census will be released in 2071.

A test census for this census year was conducted in 1968. According to the preliminary general results of the census, the population of the United Kingdom on 25 April 1971 was as follows:

Results
Territory	Total Population	Male	Female
England	45,879,670	22,299,460	23,580,210
Scotland	5,228,963	2,514,622	2,714,341
Wales	2,724,275	1,324,205	1,400,070
Northern Ireland	1,536,065	754,676	781,389
(Jersey) (Guernsey) Channel Islands	125,240	60,805	64,435
Isle of Man	49,743	23,007	26,736
United Kingdom (total)	55,573,956	27,006,775	28,567,181

The 1971 census was the first to ask when a foreign born resident arrived in the UK, however this was not continued again until 2011. In addition to removed census questions, it was the first to ask residents about their parents' country of birth, which was not asked again in any other census following. It was the first census additionally that allowed for the outputting of small area geography statistics in enumeration districts, and asked for specific date of birth instead of just the present age of residents to get a more precise age at the date of the census.

== See also ==
- Census in the United Kingdom
- List of United Kingdom censuses

Preceded by 1966	UK census 1971	Succeeded by 1981
