= 1981 United Kingdom census =

Census of the population of the United Kingdom

Census 1981
- 5 April 1981

General information
- Country: United Kingdom of Great Britain and Northern Ireland
- Authority: Office of Population Censuses and Surveys
- Website: www.ons.gov.uk/census/2001censusandearlier/aquickguideto1991andearliercensuses

The United Kingdom Census 1981 was a census of the United Kingdom of Great Britain and Northern Ireland carried out on 5 April 1981. The census will be released in 2081 or 2082 after 100 years.

== See also ==
- Census in the United Kingdom
- List of United Kingdom censuses

Preceded by 1971	UK census 1981	Succeeded by 1991
