= 1931 United Kingdom census =

Census of the population of the United Kingdom

Census 1931
- 26 April 1931

General information
- Country: United Kingdom

The United Kingdom Census 1931 was a census of the United Kingdom of Great Britain and Northern Ireland that was carried out on 26 April 1931. A census in Northern Ireland had been taken in April 1926, so no census was taken there in 1931. The questions asked were similar to those in 1921, with the addition of a question about everyone's usual place of residence, as opposed to where they actually were on that night.

The records for England and Wales were destroyed by fire in December 1942.

== Geographical scope ==
The census for England and Wales, the Channel Islands, and the Isle of Man was stored in London. The census returns for Scotland were stored separately in Edinburgh.

== Destruction of 1931 census for England and Wales ==
The 1931 census for England and Wales was destroyed by fire on 19 December 1942, during the Second World War, while in storage, along with a large amount of furniture, at the Office of Works in Hayes, Middlesex. W. A. Derrick of the General Register Office, who visited the scene of the aftermath, commented in a letter to the Central National Registration Office that "The fire was not occasioned by enemy action and how it achieved such dimensions in a store in which special hydrants had been fitted and said to have been in charge of a fire guard of 6 paid watchers, is a mystery which will need investigation". A report the following year mentioned a theory that the fire may have been started by a fire-watch employee's discarded cigarette; no action was taken. The entire census – schedules, enumeration books and plans – was destroyed, and it was recommended that in future census records be stored separately to prevent a similar complete loss. The 1931 census for Scotland was not affected as it was stored in Edinburgh.

There was no census taken in 1941 due to the Second World War; however, the register taken as a result of the National Registration Act 1939 captures many of the same details as the census, with the added advantage of having each subject's date of birth, and has assumed greater significance following the destruction of the 1931 census. The 1939 register was released into the public domain on a subscription basis in 2015 with some redactions, including details of those still alive being blanked out.

== See also ==
- Census in the United Kingdom
- List of United Kingdom censuses

Preceded by 1921	UK census 1931	Succeeded by 1951
