= 1841 United Kingdom census =

Census of the population of the United Kingdom

Census 1841
- 6 June 1841
- 1841 census page

General information
- Country: United Kingdom

Results
- Total population: 26,709,456 (▲11.2%)
- Most populous city: London (1,870,727)

The United Kingdom Census of 1841 recorded the occupants of every United Kingdom household on the night of Sunday 6 June 1841. The enactment of the Population Act 1840 meant a new procedure was adopted for taking the 1841 census. It was described as the "first modern census" as it was the first to record information about every member of the household, and administered as a single event, under central control, rather than being devolved to a local level. It formed the model for all subsequent UK censuses, although each went on to refine and expand the questions asked of householders.

It was important for early demographic analysis of the United Kingdom population and remains of interest to historians, demographers and genealogists, although the information about each person is quite limited compared with that available from later censuses.

The total population of the United Kingdom in 1841 was 26,709,456. The population of England, Wales and Scotland was recorded as 18,534,332, while the 1841 census of Ireland recorded its population as 8,175,124.

== Background ==
Due to the Population Act 1840, the United Kingdom Census of 1841 was conducted using a different framework from that of earlier United Kingdom censuses. The origins of the Population Act 1840 was the report of the 1830 Select Committee on the Population Bill, reprinted in 1840. The subject of much speculation during the select committee hearings and report was the accuracy of previous census returns, the first national census being held in 1801.

During 1840, a Bill titled, 'Population. A bill [as amended by the committee] for taking an account of the population of Great Britain; and of the parish-registers, and annual value of assessable property in England' progressed through Parliament. The Bill received Royal Assent as 'An Act for taking an Account of the Population of Great Britain 1840', with the short title, Population Act 1840.

== Administration of the census ==
The Population Act 1840 created the position, 'Commissioners for taking account of the population'. It also gave the Registrar General the responsibility for the census for England and Wales in addition to their responsibility for Civil Registration. The earliest censuses had been administered by the Overseers of the Poor but the Civil Registration system provided the local administration which could also take on the job of the census.

The involvement of the Registrar is cited as being important to reorganising the taking of the census. One of the intentions was to avoid omissions and double counting by taking the census at the same time across the whole country and collecting the data as quickly as possible. The Civil Registration Districts were subdivided into enumeration districts intended to be of a size where one person could collect the data from all households in a single day. For the first time, military personnel in the country aboard their ships or in barracks were included in the census return. Some 35,000 census enumerators were appointed to undertake the data collection, one enumerator per district, covering a population of about 16 million people.

Census forms were delivered to every household a few days before the day of the census. These were to be completed by the householder and collected by the enumerator on 7 June, the day after the census. The Population Act 1840 created an offence of refusing to answer a census question, or providing false information. Failure to comply with the demand to complete a census form was an offence and penalised by a fine. The enumerator would help in the completion of the form if, for example, the householder was illiterate.

The 1841 census recorded people's names, age, sex, occupation, and if they were born in the county of their residence, and if they were born anywhere other than in England and Wales. Children under 15 were to have their age recorded accurately, while those over 15 were to be rounded down to the nearest 5 years so, for example, someone aged 63 should be recorded as aged 60. However, not all enumerators followed this instruction and exact ages may have been recorded.

The completed census forms were transcribed into the local enumerators' schedule. In England, the schedule was countersigned by a Superintendent Registrar. In Scotland, the civil registration of birth marriages, and death had not started, so the schedules were countersigned by a schoolmaster, or somebody with a similar status.

The payment of the expenses for completing the census was delegated, in England, to the Justices of the Peace, who were to finance it through the poor rates, and in Scotland, to the Sheriff Deputies, or in Edinburgh or Glasgow, the Provost of the Royal Burghs.

== Abbreviations of Occupation ==
The census included the use of abbreviations to describe professions. These included:

- Ag. Lab – Agricultural labourer
- Ap. – Apprentice
- Army – Member of HM land forces of whatever rank
- Cl. – Clerk
- FS. – Female servant
- H.P. – Members of HM armed forces on half-pay
- Ind. – Independent – people living on their own means
- J. – Journeyman
- M. – Manufacturer
- m. – Maker e.g. Boot m.
- MS. – Male servant
- Navy – Member of HM naval forces of whatever rank including marines
- N.S. – Not Stated
- P. – Pensioners of HM armed forces
- Sh. – Shopman

== Regional populations ==
Country	Population (1841)	Area (km2)	Density (km^{2})	Percentage of total population (%)
England and Wales	15,914,148	151,058	105	59.6%
Ireland	8,175,124	84,421	97	30.6%
Scotland	2,620,184	77,933	34	9.8%
United Kingdom	26,709,456	315,093	85	100%

== Genealogy ==
As the first British census which aimed to record details about every citizen, the 1841 census is an important genealogical source. However, it has some limitations when compared to later censuses: exact ages are not usually given; relationships between members of the same household are not stated; and people's places of birth are simply noted as within the census county or not (or are quite frequently given as "N.K.", meaning "Not Known").

Very few census records for Ireland prior to 1901 survive due to the fire at the Irish Public Office on 30 June 1922. Some of the 1841 Census returns for Killeshandra of Cavan county, Kilcrohane of Cork county, Thurles of Tipperary county and Aghalurcher of Fermanagh county survived.

== See also ==
- 1841 census of Ireland
- Census in the United Kingdom
- List of United Kingdom censuses

Preceded by 1831	UK census 1841	Succeeded by 1851
