= 1991 United Kingdom census =

Census conducted in the United Kingdom on Sunday 21 April 1991

Census 1991
- 21 April 1991

General information
- Country: United Kingdom of Great Britain and Northern Ireland
- Authority: Office of Population Censuses and Surveys
- Website: ons.gov.uk (1991)

A nationwide census, commonly known as Census 1991, was conducted in the United Kingdom on Sunday 21 April 1991. This was the 19th UK census.

Census 1991 was organised by the Office of Population Censuses and Surveys in England and Wales, the General Register Office for Scotland and the Census Office for Northern Ireland. Detailed results by region, council area, ward and output area are available from their respective websites. The cost of the census was estimated at £140m, or around £7 per household. 117,500 enumerators were employed to assist with collection of census forms in Great Britain.

The 1991 census was the first UK census to have a question on ethnic group. In the 1991 UK census 94.65% of people reported themselves as being White British, White Irish or White Other with 5.35% of people reporting themselves as coming from other minority groups. Other new questions were on limiting long-term illness and term-time address for students. A question about central heating replaced the previously used question on outside toilets.

The census was also noted for a significant undercount of the population. Despite being compulsory, a total of 572,000 people failed to respond to both the census form and follow-up interviews, 220,000 of them being males aged 20 to 29. It has been suggested that part of the lack of response could be due to people attempting to avoid registration for the poll tax.

A total of 342 people were prosecuted for not completing their census returns.

== See also ==
- Census in the United Kingdom
- List of United Kingdom censuses
- Demographics of the United Kingdom

Preceded by 1981	UK census 1991	Succeeded by 2001
