= 1961 United Kingdom census =

Census of the population of the United Kingdom

Census 1961
- 23 April 1961

General information
- Country: United Kingdom

The United Kingdom Census 1961 was a census of the United Kingdom of Great Britain and Northern Ireland carried out on 23 April 1961. It was the first to ask about qualifications, migration status, and household tenure. It was also the first to use a computer, an IBM 705 at the Royal Army Pay Corps, Worthy Down, Winchester.

== Release ==
The census was conducted under the Census Act 1920 which prohibits disclosure. It is expected, however, that it will be released to the public in the year 2062.

The 1961 census was the first to use computers to process the results. This was the first census to ask where the household head was resident 1 year before the census. It was also the last census (since the introduction of the question in 1851) to include the question of county of birth to measure internal migration for the British born population.

== See also ==
- Census in the United Kingdom
- List of United Kingdom censuses

| Preceded by 1951 | UK census 1961 | Succeeded by 1966 |
