= 1921 United Kingdom census =

Census of the population of the United Kingdom

Census 1921
- 19 June 1921

General information
- Country: United Kingdom

The United Kingdom Census 1921 was a census of the United Kingdom of Great Britain and Ireland that was carried out on 19 June 1921. It was scheduled for 24 April but postponed for two months due to industrial unrest and no census was taken in Ireland due to the Irish War of Independence. It was the first census in the UK to ask about place of work and industry, and whether a marriage had been dissolved by divorce.

== Enumeration ==
According to the preliminary general results of the census, the population of Great Britain on 19 June 1921 was

Results for Great Britain
Territory	Population
England and Wales	37,886,699
Scotland	4,882,497
Jersey	49,701
Guernsey and others	40,519
Isle of Man	60,284
(United Kingdom of Great Britain and Ireland) Great Britain (total)	42,919,700

The census of Ireland was not taken until 1926, and the results were

Results for Ireland
Territory	Population
Northern Ireland	1,256,561
Irish Free State	2,971,992
(Kingdom of Ireland) Ireland (total)	4,228,553

In the 1911 census, the population of what was to become the Irish Free State had been counted as 3,139,688.

== Release ==
The census was conducted under the Census Act 1920, which prohibits disclosure for 100 years after the census was taken.

On 27 February 2019 Findmypast announced that it had been awarded the contract by the UK National Archives (in association with the Office for National Statistics) to digitise the 1921 census for England and Wales and publish it online. It was released on the FindMyPast website on 6 January 2022. Fees are charged for individual household entries, with an additional fee for an image of the relevant entry. FindMyPast's terms of use say:

You cannot use the Records to create your own work such as databases, articles, blogs, or books, or copy or reproduce the Records (either in whole or in part), or publish them, for a purpose other than personal use, without our prior written permission (and/ or that of the Licensor of the Records).

Media reporting on the England and Wales release described the census as giving an insight into British society in the years after the First World War. It was noted for example that 1.7 million more women were listed than men with a particularly sharp gender imbalance among 20 to 45 year olds, over 730,000 children were described as lacking fathers in comparison to 261,000 without mothers and that the number of people in hospital had increased by 35% since 1911 which was believed to be primarily due to veterans suffering from long-term injuries sustained during the conflict. Some responders had made political comments whilst filling out the census (e.g. “David Lloyd George, build houses” and “Out of Work in the Land Fit for Heroes”). Whilst others had used it for humour, such as one mother who had described her three young children's occupations as “Getting into mischief”, “Getting into more mischief” and (for the 11-month-old) “occupying feeding bottles” along with many households that included their pets.

The Scottish release of the census which took place on 30 November 2022 to the database ScotlandsPeople was similarly linked to the aftermath of the First World War and Spanish Flu pandemic. For instance, the population had seen its smallest decade-on-decade increase since the first census in 1801 with the male population seeing a much smaller increase than the female one. In the context of industrial unrest, it was noted that significant numbers of soldiers were stationed near collieries. In a more long-term demographic trend, the number of people listed as being able to speak Scottish Gaelic only or being bilingual had fallen significantly since 1911. Unlike in England and Wales, the original census forms filled in by responders were destroyed when the census was tabulated, so the kind of additional comments added by members of the public which were seen in the English and Welsh release are not available in the Scottish one.

The census results for Northern Ireland will not be released as the records have been lost, presumed destroyed at some point during World War II. Both NIRSA (Northern Ireland Statistics and Research Agency) and PRONI have acknowledged they never received the paperwork and do not know where it is. This census would have been tremendously valuable as it would be the first census of new polity of Northern Ireland. The next census returns to be released by PRONI for Northern Ireland date from 1937, and will be released around 2037 or early 2038.

== Contents ==
In addition to the questions asked for the 1911 census, the following information was recorded:

- Employment details:

- Householders' place of employment
- The industry they worked in
- The materials they worked with
- Their employer's name.

- If aged 15 or older, marital status (including if divorced)
- If aged under 15, whether both parents were alive or if either or both had died.
- Detailed questions on education

== See also ==
- Census in the United Kingdom
- List of United Kingdom censuses

Preceded by 1911	UK census 1921	Succeeded by 1931
