= Adber =

Hamlet in Dorset, England

Coordinates: 50°58′48″N 2°34′28″W

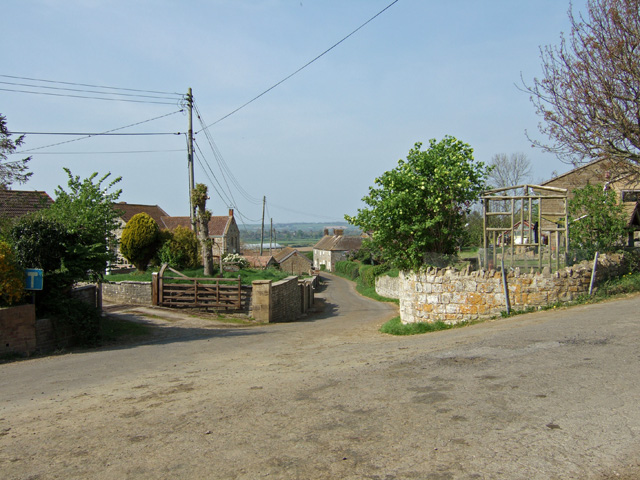
- Adber

- Location within Dorset
- OS grid reference: ST597203
- Civil parish: Trent
- Unitary authority: Dorset
- Ceremonial county: Dorset
- Region: South West
- Country: England
- Sovereign state: United Kingdom
- Post town: Sherborne
- Postcode district: DT9
- Police: Dorset
- Fire: Dorset and Wiltshire
- Ambulance: South Western
- UK Parliament: West Dorset

Adber (formerly Eatan) is a hamlet in the civil parish of Trent in Dorset, England. It is known as Ateberie in the Domesday Book.

The toponym is Old English, from Ēata and bearu ("grove"), and means "grove of a man (or the saint) named Eata".

Adber was in Somerset until 1896, when the parish of Trent was transferred to Dorset.

Adber has no church. Until the 17th century it had a chapel, but it was destroyed in the Civil War.
