= Wareham Town Hall =

Municipal building in Wareham, Dorset, England

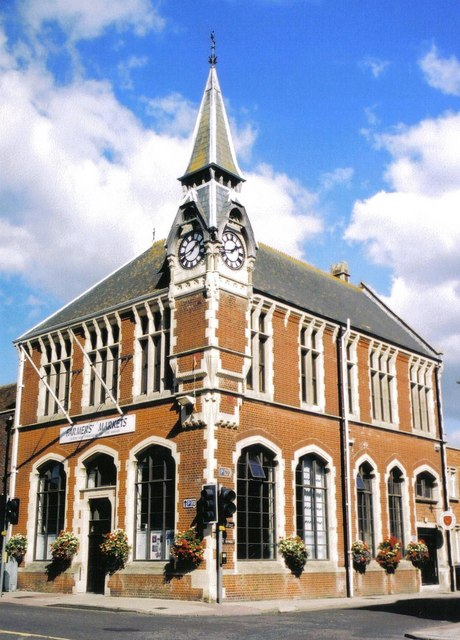
- Wareham Town Hall

- Shown in Dorset
- 50.6862°N 2.1097°W
- Location: East Street, Wareham

History
- Built: 1870

Site notes
- Architect: George Rackstraw Crickmay
- Architectural style: Gothic Revival style

Wareham Town Hall is a municipal building in East Street, Wareham, Dorset, England. The town hall, which is the meeting place of Wareham Town Council, also hosts the Wareham Town Museum.

== History ==
The town hall was built on the site of the ancient parish church of St Peter which dated back at least to the early 14th century. The church was badly damaged in a great fire which swept through the town in 1762, and the remaining structure was restored and converted for use as a municipal building in 1768. The design featured a three-stage square tower on the corner of North Street and East Street: there was a doorway with an architrave in the first stage, small windows in the second and third stages and a tall cupola above. It accommodated a school, a lock-up for petty criminals and a butcher's shop as well as a civic meeting room. By 1866, the building had become dilapidated and the mayor, Freeland Filliter, wrote to the Prince of Wales, seeking funds for a new cupola. In the event, sufficient funds were raised to rebuild the whole structure.

The current structure was designed by George Rackstraw Crickmay of Weymouth in the Gothic Revival style, built in red brick with stone dressings at a cost of £1,500 and was completed in 1870. The design involved an ornate corbelled clock tower with a spire on the corner of the two streets. On the three-bay North Street elevation, there was a doorway in the central bay, and on the five-bay East Street elevation, there was a doorway in the right hand bay. The other bays on the ground floor were fenestrated with tall windows with architraves while all the bays on the first floor were fenestrated with mullioned and transomed windows. Internally, the principal rooms were the corn exchange on the ground floor and the magistrates' rooms and the council chamber on the first floor; the Royal coat of arms of King William III was set into the south wall of the council chamber.

The borough council, which had met in the town hall, was reformed under the Municipal Corporations Act 1883. The building continued to serve as the headquarters of borough council for much of the 20th century, but ceased to be the local seat of government when the enlarged Purbeck District Council was formed at Westport House in 1974. Instead, the council chamber became the home of Wareham Town Council, while the Wareham Town Museum, which had been established in a building on St John's Hill in 1974, moved into the eastern end of the ground floor accommodation in 1984. The rooms used by the museum were refurbished with support from the Heritage Lottery Fund in 1998.
