= St Martin's Church, Wareham =

Church in Dorset, England

- St Martin's-on-the-walls, Wareham
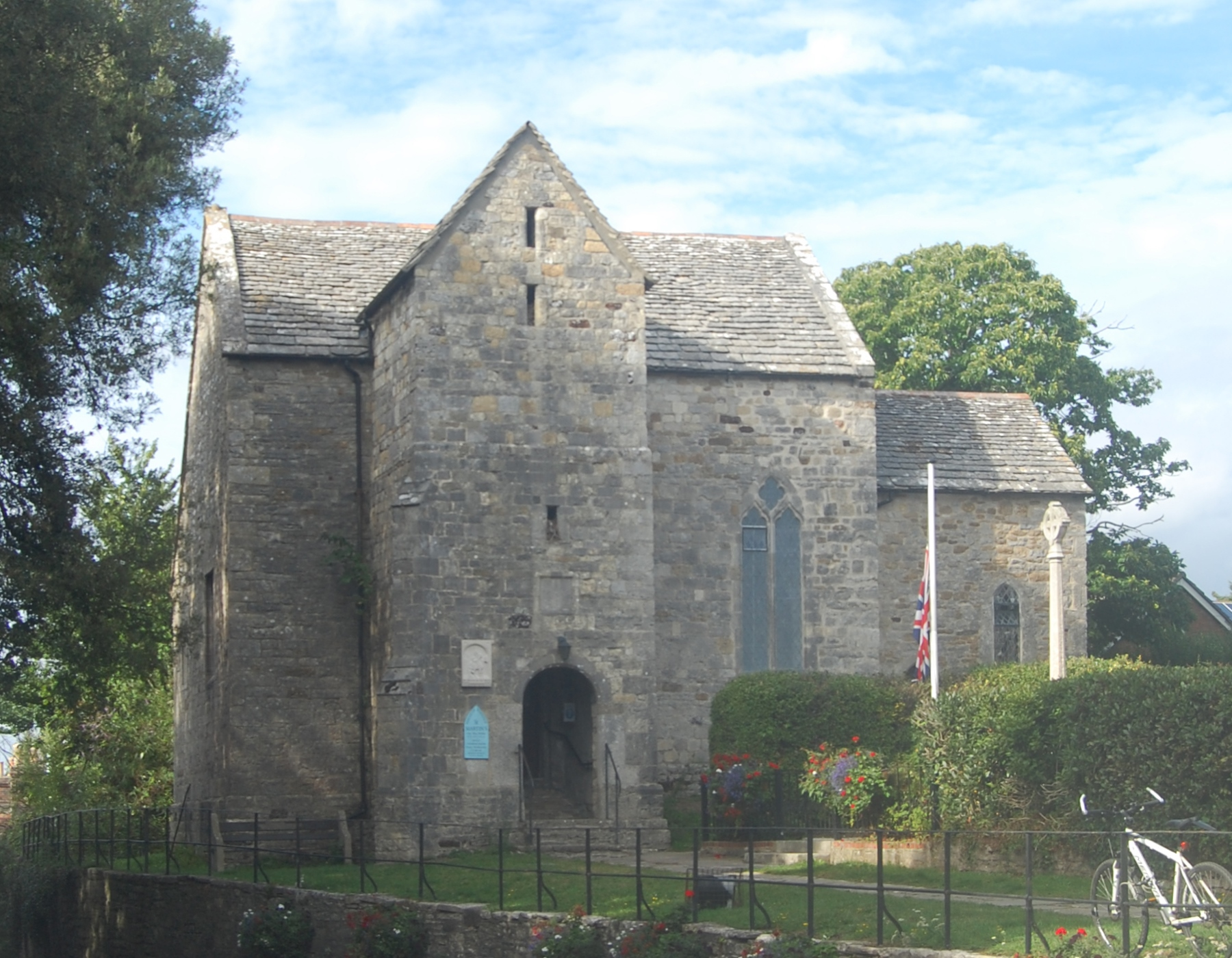
- St Martin's Church, Wareham
- 50.6888°N 2.1115°W
- Country: England
- Denomination: Church of England

History
- Dedication: St Martin

Architecture
- Heritage designation: Grade I listed
- Designated: 7 May 1952
- Style: Saxon
- Years built: circa 1030

Administration
- Diocese: Salisbury

St Martin's Church, Wareham, sometimes St Martin's-on-the-walls, is an Anglo-Saxon church in the town of Wareham in Dorset, England. It is the most complete example of an Anglo-Saxon church in Dorset. It is a Grade I listed building and a scheduled monument.

== History and features ==
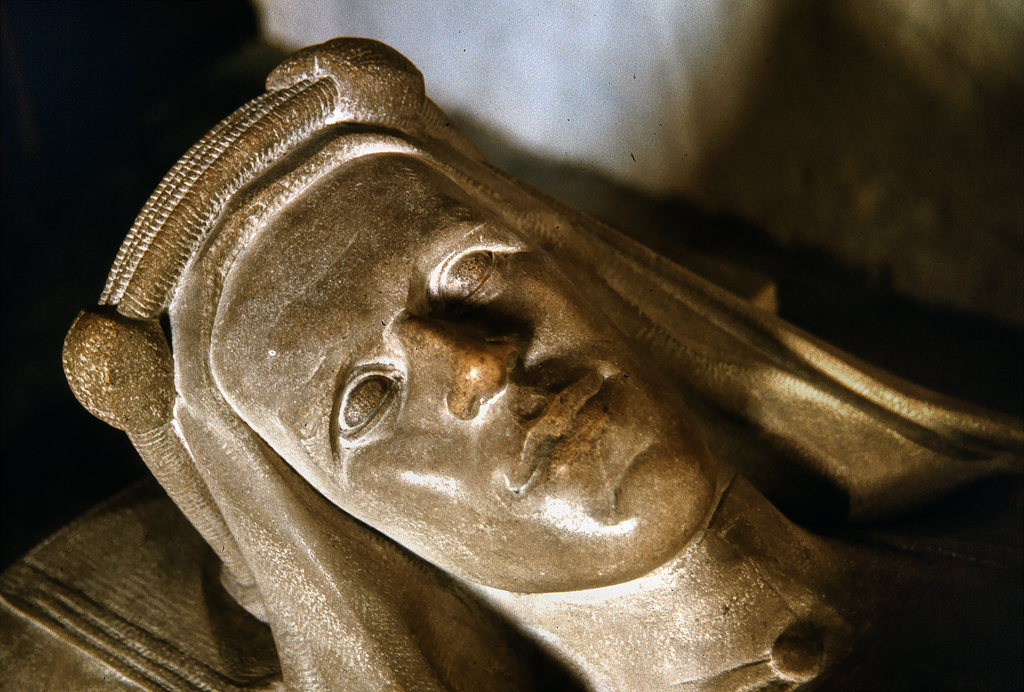
T. E. Lawrence effigy

The church is reputed to have been founded by Saint Aldhelm in the 7th century. It is thought that this earlier building was destroyed by King Canute in 1015. The present building dates from about AD 1020. Anglo-Saxon features include a tall, narrow nave and chancel, late Anglo-Saxon wall-arcading in the north west aisle and traces of a Saxon door. The building has been altered and expanded over the years but the nave and a tiny window in the north side of the chancel are original features. On the north wall of the chancel are 12th-century frescoes depicting Saint Martin on horseback, escorted by attendants, dividing his cloak and giving one half to a naked beggar.

On one of the walls a number of red stars have been painted, possibly representing plague deaths in the 17th century.

During the Great Fire of Wareham in 1762, the church was used as a temporary refuge for those who had lost their homes. Later the church fell into disuse but at the beginning of the 20th century a programme of restoration began and the church was rededicated on 23 November 1936.

In the north aisle sits a stone tomb effigy of T. E. Lawrence (Lawrence of Arabia), created by his friend Eric Kennington. Lawrence was buried at Moreton, Dorset in 1935.

The church is still in use, with a regular weekly communion on Wednesdays.
