= Trent, Dorset =

Village in England

Coordinates: 50.9652°N 2.5821°W

Trent
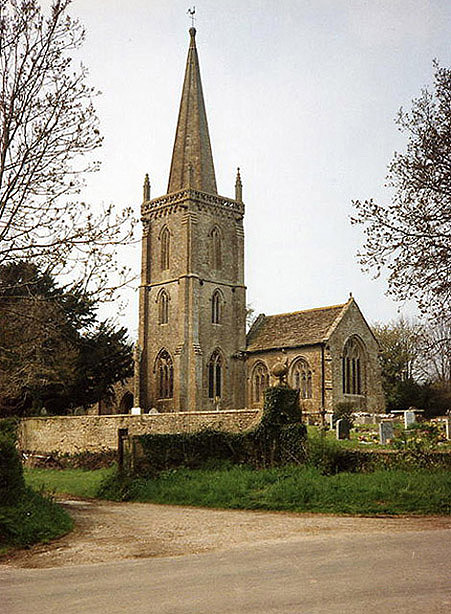
- The church of St Andrew

- Location within Dorset
- Population: 317
- OS grid reference: ST592186
- Unitary authority: Dorset
- Ceremonial county: Dorset
- Region: South West
- Country: England
- Sovereign state: United Kingdom
- Post town: Sherborne
- Postcode district: DT9
- Police: Dorset
- Fire: Dorset and Wiltshire
- Ambulance: South Western
- UK Parliament: West Dorset

Trent is a village and civil parish in northwest Dorset, England, situated in the Yeo valley 4 miles (6.4 km) northwest of Sherborne and four miles northeast of Yeovil. It was in Somerset until 1896. In the 2011 census the parish—which includes the hamlets of Adber and Hummer to the north—had a population of 317.

The parish was part of the Somerset hundred of Horethorne.

Charles II of England stayed at Trent House for several days during his escape to France in 1651.

The Trent Estate is owned by the Ernest Cook Trust, purchased by Ernest Cook in 1935 as the first of a number of English estates he purchased for their protection. The village has good architecture from the Medieval, Tudor, and later periods, with many trees in the background. The church of St Andrew is architecturally interesting and the lateral tower is topped by one of the three ancient stone spires of Dorset. The church was built in the 13th century and enlarged in the 14th and 15th centuries. Restoration and refitting was done about 1840 in a pre-Victorian way. Features of interest include the rood screen, the pulpit of continental origin, the 16th century bench ends and the old painted glass in the east window.

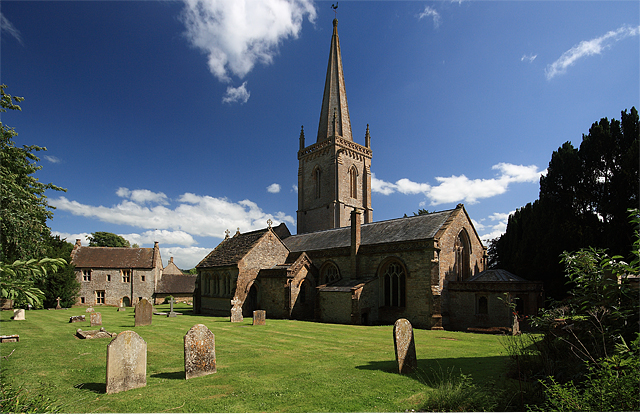
St Andrew's Parish Church and The Chantry

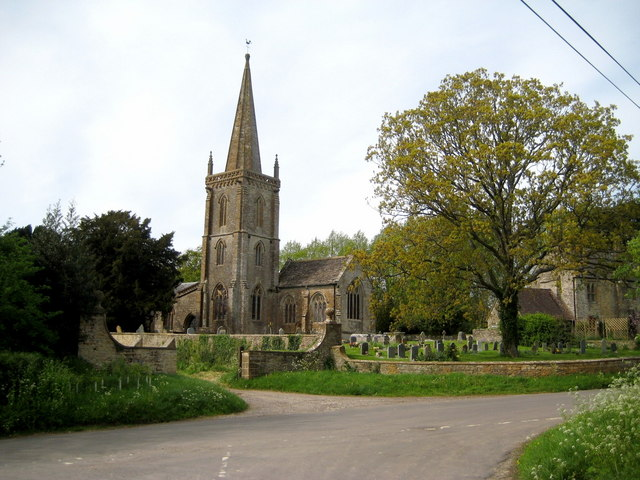
Church of St Andrew

== People ==
General Henry Rawlinson, who led the British Army at the Battle of the Somme, was born and is buried in the village.Geoffrey Fisher, former Archbishop of Canterbury, lived at Trent when he served in his retirement from episcopacy as an honorary assisting curate until his death in 1972 and is also buried at Trent. The actresses Kristin Scott Thomas and Serena Scott Thomas spent their childhoods in Trent.
