= Wareham Town Museum =

Coordinates: 50.6862°N 2.1095°W

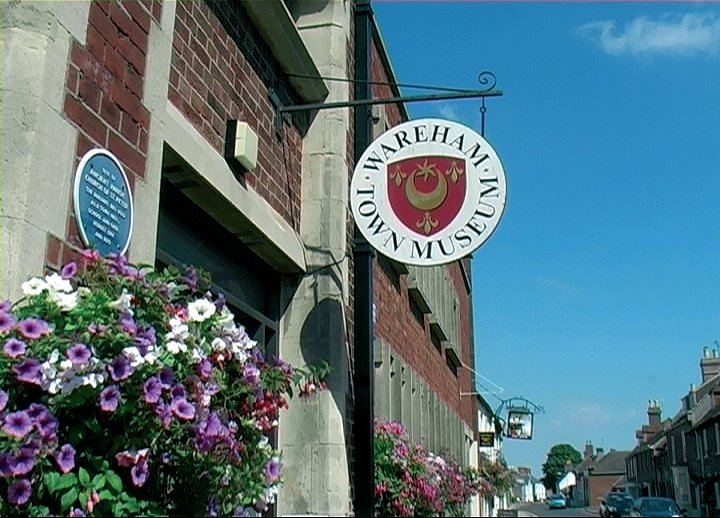
Exterior of Wareham Town Museum

Wareham Town Museum tells the story of the Wareham area of Dorset in southern England from prehistoric times to the present day, with a special exhibition on Lawrence of Arabia, who lived nearby. The museum, which is in the centre of Wareham, in Wareham Town Hall, is supported by the Wareham Town Council and is run by volunteers.

== Museum ==
The museum is based in Wareham Town Hall and focusses on the local area and the people who lived in Wareham over the centuries. It includes information about archaeology, geology and local history. It is staffed by volunteers and runs on donations.

The museum has a special section on Lawrence of Arabia, who lived close by at Clouds Hill, now maintained by National Trust. They have hosted lectures by the archaeologist, Neil Faulkner, on the topic, explaining Lawrence's role at the Hallat Ammar train ambush in 1917, showing a bullet apparently fired from a Colt pistol by Lawrence himself. The museum has produced an hour-long DVD entitled T. E. Lawrence — His Final Years in Dorset which includes a reconstruction of Lawrence's fatal motorcycle accident while riding his beloved Brough Superior near his home, Clouds Hill, in May 1935.

The museum displays some Saxon artefacts, including the Wareham Sword which is currently on loan from the Dorset Museum in Dorchester. The remains of this late 10th century sword were discovered in the mud of the River Frome in 1927 by workers constructing the new South Bridge at Wareham. It is made of iron, with an intricately decorated pommel, a guard originally decorated with thin plates of copper and silver, and a grip bearing an Old English inscription translating as "Æþe... owns me". The name "Æthe[l….]" indicates that the sword belonged to a member of the Saxon royal family, notwithstanding the Viking style of the hilt and its decoration. The Wareham Sword is the only Saxon sword found in England with a royal owner’s name on it.
