= Dorset =

County of England

- Ceremonial county
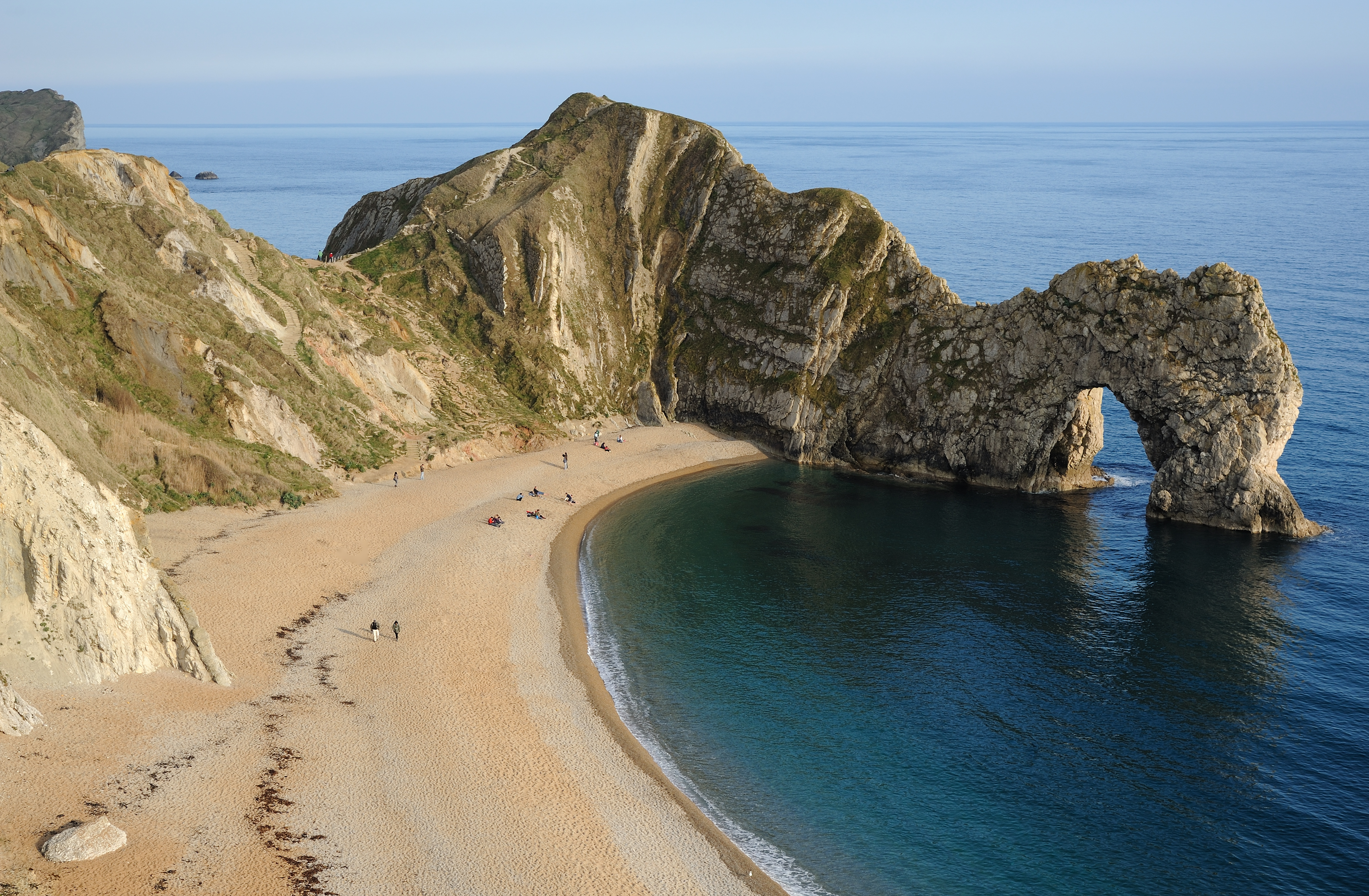
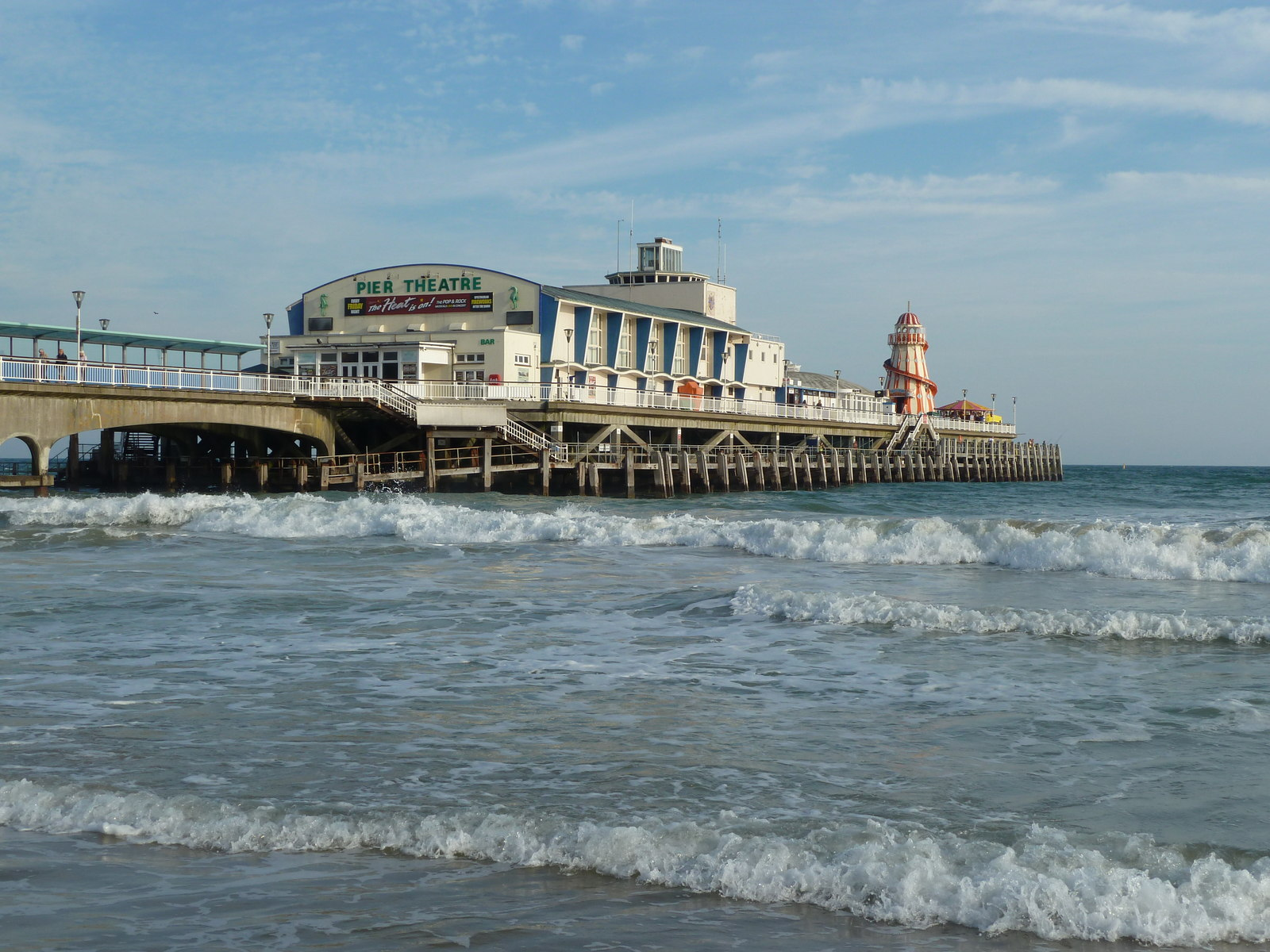
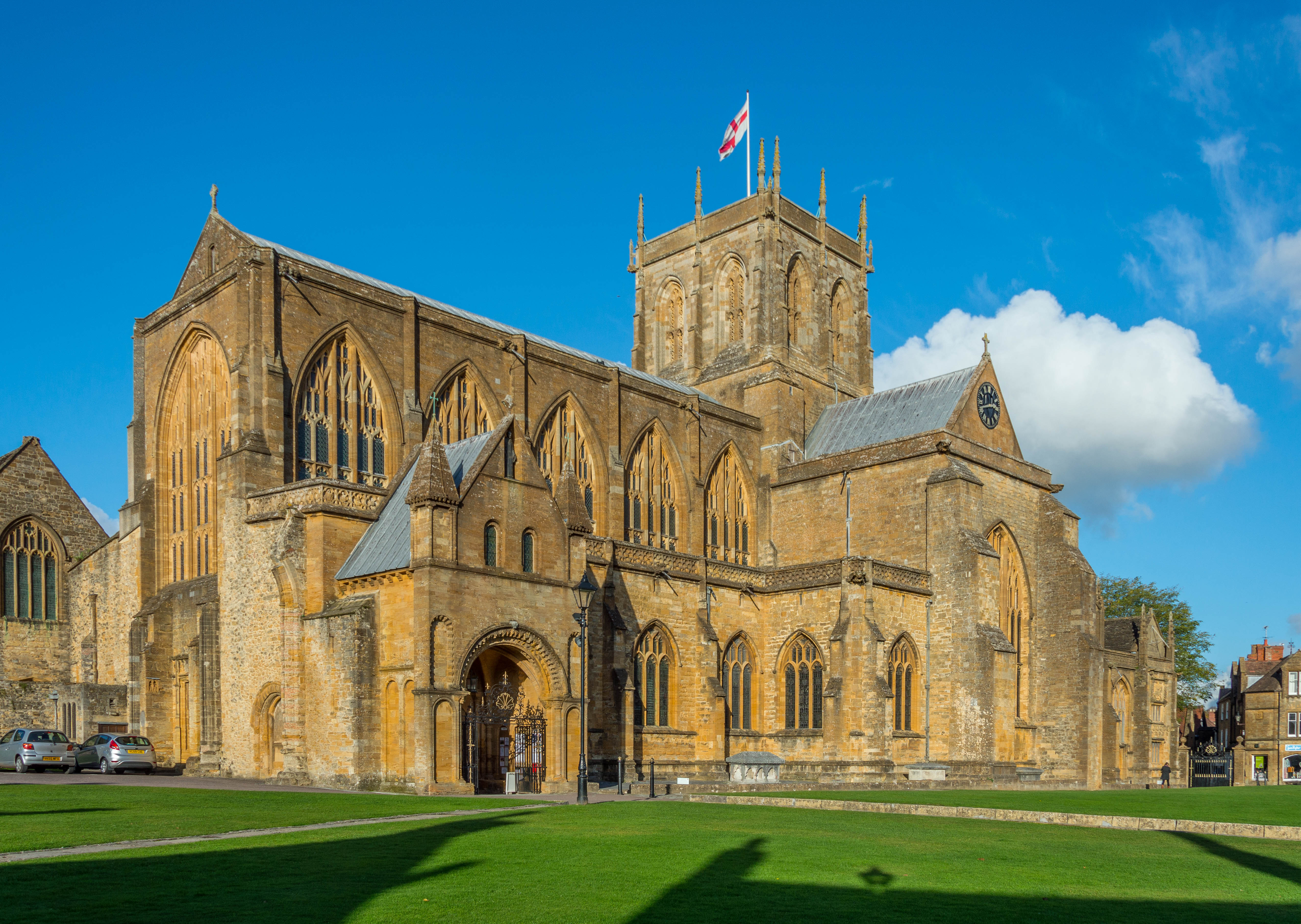
- Durdle Door on the Jurassic Coast, Bournemouth Pier, and Sherborne Abbey

- Coordinates: 50°48′N 2°18′W
- Sovereign state: United Kingdom
- Constituent country: England
- Region: South West
- Established: Ancient
- Time zone: UTC+0 (GMT)
  - Summer (DST): UTC+1 (BST)
- UK Parliament: List of MPs
- Police: Dorset Police
- Ceremonial county
- Lord Lieutenant: Michael Dooley
- High Sheriff: Helena Margaret Conibear
- Area: 2,653 km^{2} (1,024 sq mi)
  - Rank: 20th of 48
- Population (2024): 798,914
  - Rank: 32nd of 48
  - Density: 301/km^{2} (780/sq mi)
- Unitary authorities
- Councils: Bournemouth, Christchurch and Poole Council; Dorset Council
- Districts
- Districts of Dorset; Unitary
- Districts: 1. Dorset; 2. Bournemouth, Christchurch and Poole

Dorset (/ˈdɔːrsɪt/ DOR-sit; archaically: Dorsetshire /ˈdɔːrsɪt.ʃɪər, -ʃər/ DOR-sit-sheer, -shər) is a ceremonial county in South West England. It is bordered by Somerset to the north-west, Wiltshire to the north and the north-east, Hampshire to the east, the Isle of Wight across the Solent to the south-east, the English Channel to the south, and Devon to the west. The largest settlement is Bournemouth.

The county has an area of 2,653 km^{2} (1,024 sq mi) and had an estimated population of 798,914 in 2024. A conurbation on the south-east coast contains the towns of Bournemouth, Christchurch, and Poole. The remainder of the county is largely rural, and its principal towns are the seaside resort of Weymouth in the south and Dorchester in the south-centre. For local government purposes, Dorset comprises two unitary authority areas: Bournemouth, Christchurch and Poole and Dorset. The county did not historically include Bournemouth and Christchurch, which were part of Hampshire.

Dorset has a varied landscape of chalk downs, steep limestone ridges, and low-lying clay valleys. The majority of its coastline is part of the Jurassic Coast World Heritage Site due to its geological and palaeontologic significance, and features notable landforms such as Lulworth Cove, the Isle of Portland, Chesil Beach and Durdle Door. The north of the county contains part of Cranborne Chase, a chalk downland. The highest point in Dorset is Lewesdon Hill (279 m (915 ft)), in the south-west.

There is evidence of Neolithic, Celtic, and Roman settlement in Dorset, and during the Early Middle Ages the region was settled by the Saxons; the county developed in the 7th century. The first recorded Viking raid on the British Isles occurred in Dorset in 789 AD, and the Black Death entered England at Melcombe Regis in 1348. The county has seen much civil unrest: in the English Civil War an uprising of Clubmen vigilantes was crushed by Oliver Cromwell's forces in a pitched battle near Shaftesbury; the doomed Monmouth Rebellion began at Lyme Regis; and the Tolpuddle Martyrs, a group of Dorset farm labourers, were instrumental in the formation of the trade union movement. During the Second World War, Dorset was heavily involved in the preparations for the invasion of Normandy, and the large harbours of Portland and Poole were two of the main embarkation points. Agriculture was historically the major industry of Dorset, but is now in decline in favour of tourism.

== Toponymy ==
Dorset derives its name from the county town of Dorchester. The Romans established the settlement in the 1st century and named it Durnovaria, which was a Latinised version of a Common Brittonic word possibly meaning "place with fist-sized pebbles". The Saxons named the town Dornwaraceaster (the suffix -ceaster being the Old English name for a "Roman town"; cf. Exeter and Gloucester) and Dornsæte came into use as the name for the inhabitants of the area from Dorn (a reduced form of Dornwaraceaster) and the Old English word sæte (meaning "people"). The same ending can also be seen in the neighbouring Somerset. It is first mentioned in the Anglo-Saxon Chronicle in AD 845 and in the 10th century the county's archaic name, Dorseteschyre (Dorsetshire), was first recorded.

== History ==
=== Early history ===
The first human visitors to Dorset were Mesolithic hunters, from around 8000 BC. The first permanent Neolithic settlers appeared around 3000 BC and were responsible for the creation of the Dorset Cursus, a 10.5-kilometre (6.5 mi) monument for ritual or ceremonial purposes. From 2800 BC onwards Bronze Age farmers cleared Dorset's woodlands for agricultural use and Dorset's high chalk hills provided a location for numerous round barrows. During the Iron Age, the British tribe known as the Durotriges established a series of hill forts across the county—most notably Maiden Castle, which is one of the largest in Europe.

The Romans arrived in Dorset during their conquest of Britain in AD 43. Maiden Castle was captured by the Legio II Augusta under the command of Vespasian, and the Roman settlement of Durnovaria was established nearby. Bokerley Dyke, a large defensive ditch built by the county's post-Roman inhabitants near the border with modern-day Hampshire, delayed the advance of the Saxons into Dorset for almost 150 years. It appears to have been re-fortified during this period, with the former Roman Road at Ackling Dyke also being blocked by the Britons, apparently to prevent the West Saxon advance into Dorset.

However, by the end of the 7th century, Dorset had fallen under Saxon control and been incorporated into the Kingdom of Wessex. The precise details of this West Saxon conquest and how it took place are not clear, but it appears to have substantially taken place by the start of the reign of Caedwalla in 685. The Saxons established a diocese at Sherborne (later to develop into the Diocese of Salisbury) and Dorset was made a shire—an administrative district of Wessex and predecessor to the English county system—with borders that have changed little since. In 789, the first recorded Viking attack on the British Isles took place in Dorset on the Portland coast, and they continued to raid into the county for the next two centuries.

Following the Norman Conquest in 1066, feudal rule was established in Dorset and the bulk of the land was divided between the Crown and ecclesiastical institutions. The Normans consolidated their control over the area by constructing castles at Corfe, Wareham and Dorchester in the early part of the 12th century. Over the next 200 years, Dorset's population grew substantially and additional land was enclosed for farming to provide the extra food required. The wool trade, the quarrying of Purbeck Marble and the busy ports of Weymouth, Melcombe Regis, Lyme Regis and Bridport brought prosperity to the county. However, Dorset was devastated by the bubonic plague in 1348, which arrived in Melcombe Regis on a ship from Gascony. The disease, more commonly known as the Black Death, created an epidemic that spread rapidly and wiped out a third of the population of the country. Dorset came under the political influence of a number of different nobles during the Middle Ages. During the Wars of the Roses, for instance, Dorset came into the area influenced by Humphrey Stafford, earl of Devon (originally of Hooke, Dorset) whose wider influence stretched from Cornwall to Wiltshire. After 1485, one of the most influential Dorset figures was Henry VII's chamberlain Giles Daubeney.

=== Modern history ===
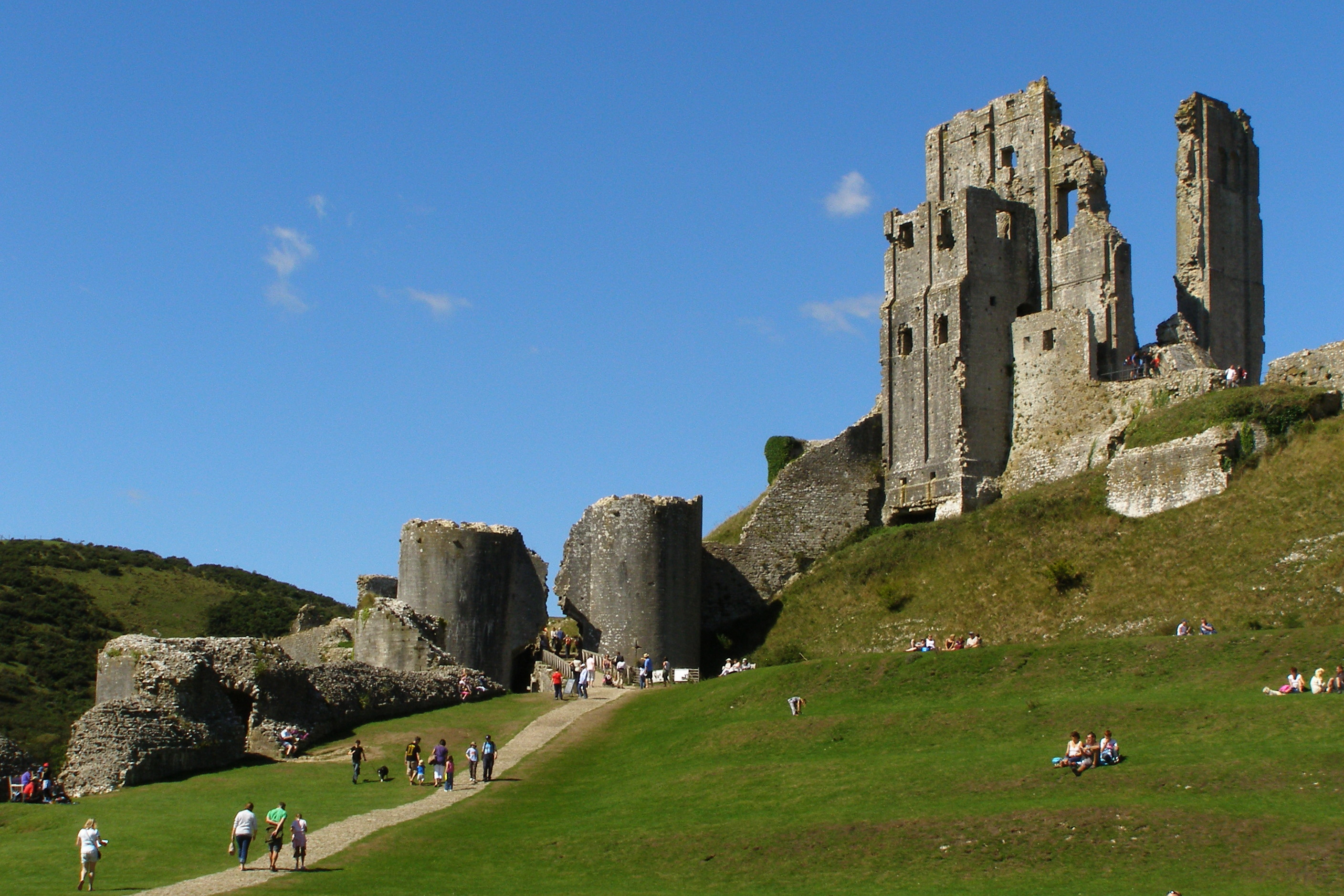
Corfe Castle, captured and destroyed by Cromwell's army in 1646

The dissolution of the monasteries (1536–1541) met little resistance in Dorset and many of the county's abbeys, including Shaftesbury, Cerne and Milton, were sold to private owners. In 1642, at the commencement of the English Civil War, the Royalists took control of the entire county apart from Poole and Lyme Regis. However, within three years their gains had been almost entirely reversed by the Parliamentarians. An uprising of Clubmen—vigilantes weary of the depredations of the war—took place in Dorset in 1645. Some 2,000 of these rebels offered battle to Lord Fairfax's Parliamentary army at Hambledon Hill but they were easily routed. Sherborne Castle was taken by Fairfax that same year and in 1646 Corfe Castle, the last remaining Royalist stronghold in Dorset, was captured after an act of betrayal: both were subsequently slighted. The Duke of Monmouth's unsuccessful attempt to overthrow James II began when he landed at Lyme Regis in 1685. A series of trials known as the Bloody Assizes took place to punish the rebels. Over a five-day period in Dorchester, Judge Jeffreys presided over 312 cases: 74 of the accused were executed, 175 were sentenced to penal transportation, and nine were publicly whipped. In 1686, at Charborough Park, a meeting took place to plot the downfall of James II of England. This meeting was effectively the start of the Glorious Revolution.

During the 18th century, much smuggling took place along the Dorset coast; its coves, caves and sandy beaches provided opportunities for gangs such as the Hawkhursts to stealthily bring smuggled goods ashore. Poole became Dorset's busiest port and established prosperous trade links with the fisheries of Newfoundland which supported cloth, rope and net manufacturing industries in the surrounding towns and villages. However, the Industrial Revolution largely bypassed Dorset which lacked coal resources and as a consequence the county remained predominantly agricultural. Farming has always been central to the economy of Dorset and the county became the birthplace of the modern trade union movement when, in 1834, six farm labourers formed a union to protest against falling wages. The labourers, who are now known as the Tolpuddle Martyrs, were subsequently arrested for administering "unlawful oaths" and sentenced to transportation but they were pardoned following massive protests by the working classes.

The Dorsetshire Regiment were the first British unit to face a gas attack during the First World War (1914–1918) and they sustained particularly heavy losses at the Battle of the Somme. In total some 4,500 Dorset servicemen died in the war and of the county's towns and villages, only one, Langton Herring, known as a Thankful Village, had no residents killed. During the Second World War (1939–1945) Dorset was heavily involved in the preparations for the invasion of Normandy: beach landing exercises were carried out at Studland and Weymouth and the village of Tyneham was requisitioned for army training. Tens of thousands of troops departed Weymouth, Portland and Poole harbours during the D-Day Normandy landings and gliders from RAF Tarrant Rushton dropped troops near Caen to begin Operation Tonga.

Dorset experienced an increase in holiday-makers following the war. First popularised as a tourist destination by George III's frequent visits to Weymouth, the county's coastline, seaside resorts and its sparsely populated rural areas attract millions of visitors each year. With farming declining across the country, tourism has edged ahead as the primary revenue-earning sector.

== Settlements ==
Some of the larger settlements of Dorset

Dorset is largely rural with many small villages, few large towns and no cities. The only major urban area is the South East Dorset conurbation, which is situated at the south-eastern end of the county and is atypical of the county as a whole. It consists of the seaside resort of Bournemouth, the historic port and borough of Poole, the towns of Christchurch and Ferndown plus many surrounding villages. Bournemouth, the most populous town in the conurbation, was established in the Georgian era when sea bathing became popular. Poole, the second largest settlement (once the largest town in the county), adjoins Bournemouth to the west and contains the suburb of Sandbanks which has some of the highest land values by area in the world.

The other two major settlements in the county are Dorchester, which has been the county town since at least 1305, and Weymouth, a major seaside resort since the 18th century. Blandford Forum, Sherborne, Gillingham, Shaftesbury and Sturminster Newton are historic market towns which serve the farms and villages of the Blackmore Vale in north Dorset. Beaminster and Bridport are situated in the west of the county; Verwood and the historic Saxon market towns of Wareham and Wimborne Minster are located to the east. Lyme Regis and Swanage are small coastal towns popular with tourists. Under construction on the western edge of Dorchester is the experimental new town of Poundbury commissioned and co-designed by Charles III when he was Prince of Wales. The suburb, which is expected to be fully completed by 2025, was designed to integrate residential and retail buildings and counter the growth of dormitory towns and car-oriented development.

== Physical geography ==
Dorset covers an area of 2,653 square kilometres (1,024 sq mi) and contains considerable variety in its underlying geology, which is partly responsible for the diversity of landscape. A large percentage (66%) of the county comprises either chalk, clay or mixed sand and gravels. The remainder is less straightforward and includes Portland and Purbeck stone, other limestones, calcareous clays and shales. Portland and Purbeck stone are of national importance as a building material and for restoring some of Britain's most famous landmarks. Almost every type of rock known from the Early Jurassic to the Eocene epochs can be found in the county.

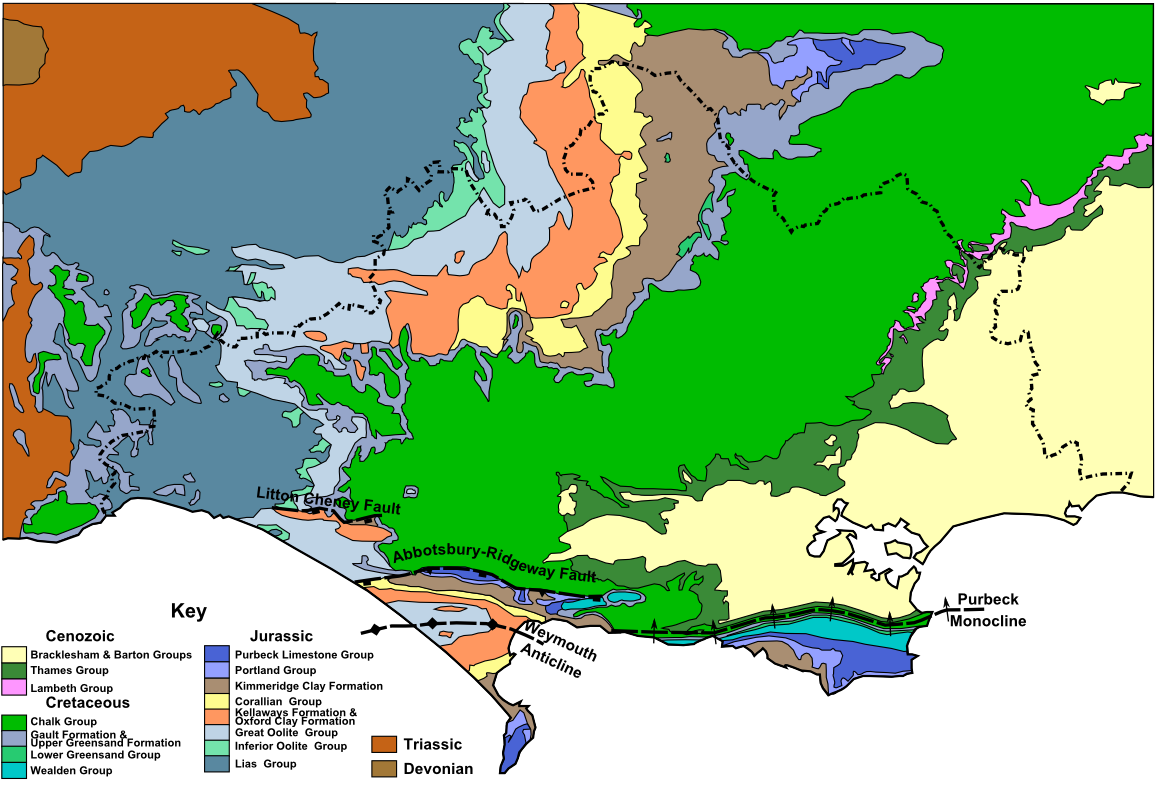
Geological map of Dorset

Dorset has a number of limestone ridges which are mostly covered in either arable fields or calcareous grassland supporting sheep. These limestone areas include a wide band of Cretaceous chalk which crosses the county as a range of hills from north-east to south-west, incorporating Cranborne Chase and the Dorset Downs, and a narrow band running from south-west to south-east, incorporating the Purbeck Hills. Between the chalk hills are large, wide vales and wide flood plains. These vales are dotted with small villages, farms and coppices, and include the Blackmore Vale (Stour valley) and the Frome valley. The Blackmore Vale is composed of older Jurassic deposits, largely clays interspersed with limestones, and has traditionally been a centre for dairy agriculture. South-east Dorset, including the lower Frome valley and around Poole and Bournemouth, comprises younger Eocene deposits, mainly sands and clays of poor agricultural quality. The soils created from these deposits support a heathland habitat which sustains all six native British reptile species. Most of the Dorset heathland has Site of Special Scientific Interest status, with three areas designated as internationally important Ramsar sites. In the far west of the county and along the coast there are frequent changes in rock strata, which appear in a less obviously sequential way compared to the landscapes of the chalk and the heath. In the west this results in a hilly landscape of diverse character that resembles that of neighbouring county Devon. Marshwood Vale, a valley of Lower Lias clay at the western tip of the county, lies to the south of the two highest points in Dorset: Lewesdon Hill at 279 metres (915 ft) and Pilsdon Pen at 277 metres (909 ft).

A former river valley flooded by rising sea levels 6,000 years ago, Poole Harbour is one of the largest natural harbours in the world. The harbour is very shallow in places and contains a number of islands, notably Brownsea Island, the birthplace of the Scouting movement and one of the few remaining sanctuaries for indigenous red squirrels in England. The harbour, and the chalk and limestone hills of the Isle of Purbeck to the south, lie atop Western Europe's largest onshore oil field. The field, operated by Perenco from Wytch Farm, has the world's oldest continuously pumping well at Kimmeridge which has been producing oil since the early 1960s.

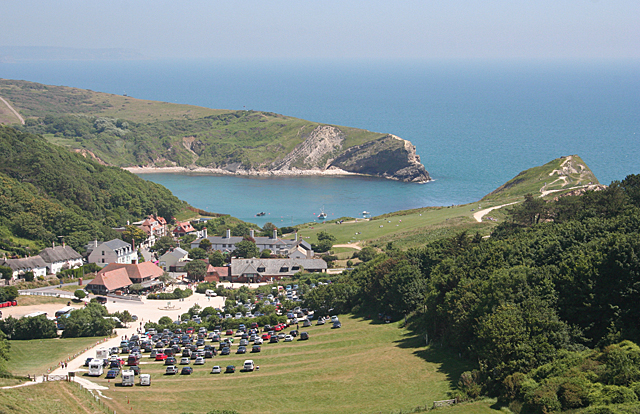
Lulworth Cove from Hambury Tout, on the Jurassic Coast

Dorset's diverse geography ensures it has an assortment of rivers, although a moderate annual rainfall coupled with rolling hills, means most are typically lowland in nature. Much of the county drains into three rivers, the Frome, Piddle and Stour which all flow to the sea in a south-easterly direction. The Frome and Piddle are chalk streams but the Stour, which rises in Wiltshire to the north, has its origins in clay soil. The River Avon, which flows mainly through Wiltshire and Hampshire, enters Dorset towards the end of its journey at Christchurch Harbour. The rivers Axe and Yeo, which principally drain the counties of Devon and Somerset respectively, have their sources in the north-west of the county. In the south-west, a number of small rivers run into the sea along the Dorset coastline; most notable of these are the Char, Brit, Bride and Wey.

Most of Dorset's coastline is part of the Jurassic Coast, a World Heritage Site, which stretches for 155 kilometres (96 mi) between Studland and Exmouth in Devon. This coast documents the entire Mesozoic era, from Triassic to Cretaceous, and is noted for its geological landforms. The Dorset section has yielded important fossils, including Jurassic trees and the first complete Ichthyosaur, discovered near Lyme Regis in 1811 by Mary Anning. The county features some notable coastal landforms, including examples of a cove (Lulworth Cove), a natural arch (Durdle Door) and chalk stacks (Old Harry Rocks). Jutting out into the English Channel at roughly the midpoint of the Dorset coastline is the Isle of Portland, a limestone island that is connected to the mainland by Chesil Beach, a 27-kilometre (17 mi) long shingle barrier beach protecting The Fleet, Britain's largest tidal lagoon.

The county has one of the highest proportions of conservation areas in England, and two Areas of Outstanding Natural Beauty (AONBs) cover 53% of the administrative county. It has two heritage coasts totalling 92 kilometres (57 mi), and Sites of Special Scientific Interest covering 199 km^{2} (77 sq mi). The South West Coast Path, a National Trail, begins at South Haven Point at the entrance to Poole Harbour. There are also substantial areas of green belt surrounding the South East Dorset conurbation, filling in the area between this and the Cranborne Chase and West Wiltshire Downs AONB.

Map of the Ceremonial County of Dorset

=== Climate ===
Weymouth, Dorset

Climate chart (precipitation, max. and min. temperature)
J	F	M	A	M	J	J	A	S	O	N	D
84 9 5	61 9 4	58 11 5	52 13 7	45 16 9	46 18 12	41 20 14	55 20 14	55 19 13	83 16 10	99 12 7	92 10 5
- █ Average max. and min. temperatures in °C
- █ Precipitation totals in mm
- Source: Met Office, 1991–2020
Imperial conversion
J	F	M	A	M	J	J	A	S	O	N	D
3.3 48 40	2.4 48 39	2.3 51 41	2.1 55 44	1.8 60 49	1.8 65 54	1.6 68 57	2.2 69 58	2.2 66 55	3.3 60 51	3.9 54 45	3.6 49 41
- █ Average max. and min. temperatures in °F
- █ Precipitation totals in inches

Dorset's climate of warm summers and mild winters is partly due to its position on Britain's south coast. The third most southerly county in the UK, Dorset is less affected by the more intense Atlantic winds than Cornwall and Devon. Dorset, along with the entire South West England, has higher winter temperatures, average 4.5 to 8.7 °C (40.1 to 47.7 °F), than the rest of the United Kingdom. However, Dorset maintains higher summer temperatures than Devon and Cornwall, with average highs of 19.1 to 22.2 °C (66.4 to 72.0 °F). Excluding hills such as the Dorset Downs, the average annual temperature of the county is 9.8 to 12 °C (49.6 to 53.6 °F).

The south coast counties of Dorset, Hampshire, West Sussex, East Sussex and Kent enjoy more sunshine than anywhere else in the United Kingdom, receiving 1,541–1,885 hours a year. Average annual rainfall varies across the county—southern and eastern coastal areas receive 700–800 mm (28–31 in) per year; the Dorset Downs receive between 1,000 and 1,250 mm (39–49 in) per year; less than much of Devon and Cornwall to the west but more than counties to the east.

Climate data for Weymouth, Wyke Regis (1991-2020 normals, extremes 1993-2015)
Month	Jan	Feb	Mar	Apr	May	Jun	Jul	Aug	Sep	Oct	Nov	Dec	Year
Record high °C (°F)	13.6 (56.5)	14.1 (57.4)	20.7 (69.3)	22.4 (72.3)	25.3 (77.5)	27.5 (81.5)	28.0 (82.4)	31.9 (89.4)	26.7 (80.1)	23.2 (73.8)	17.1 (62.8)	14.4 (57.9)	31.9 (89.4)
Mean daily maximum °C (°F)	9.0 (48.2)	8.9 (48.0)	10.6 (51.1)	12.9 (55.2)	15.7 (60.3)	18.1 (64.6)	20.0 (68.0)	20.3 (68.5)	18.7 (65.7)	15.5 (59.9)	12.2 (54.0)	9.7 (49.5)	14.3 (57.7)
Daily mean °C (°F)	6.7 (44.1)	6.5 (43.7)	7.9 (46.2)	9.8 (49.6)	12.5 (54.5)	15.1 (59.2)	17.0 (62.6)	17.4 (63.3)	15.7 (60.3)	13.0 (55.4)	9.9 (49.8)	7.4 (45.3)	11.6 (52.9)
Mean daily minimum °C (°F)	4.5 (40.1)	4.1 (39.4)	5.2 (41.4)	6.6 (43.9)	9.3 (48.7)	12.0 (53.6)	14.0 (57.2)	14.4 (57.9)	12.7 (54.9)	10.4 (50.7)	7.4 (45.3)	5.1 (41.2)	8.8 (47.8)
Record low °C (°F)	−5.6 (21.9)	−4.0 (24.8)	−2.6 (27.3)	−2.1 (28.2)	2.6 (36.7)	6.3 (43.3)	9.1 (48.4)	8.2 (46.8)	5.0 (41.0)	−0.1 (31.8)	−3.2 (26.2)	−4.9 (23.2)	−5.6 (21.9)
Average precipitation mm (inches)	84.3 (3.32)	60.5 (2.38)	58.1 (2.29)	52.4 (2.06)	44.6 (1.76)	45.9 (1.81)	40.7 (1.60)	55.4 (2.18)	54.9 (2.16)	82.7 (3.26)	98.7 (3.89)	92.2 (3.63)	770.4 (30.33)
Average precipitation days (≥ 1.0 mm)	12.9	10.8	9.0	8.5	8.2	7.2	6.7	8.3	8.0	11.9	13.2	13.1	117.5
Mean monthly sunshine hours	69.1	95.5	141.5	202.1	235.4	234.8	245.6	225.7	178.1	127.5	84.6	64.5	1,904.4
Source 1: Met Office
Source 2: Starlings Roost Weather

== Demography ==
In the 2021 census, the ceremonial county of Dorset had a usual resident population of 779,775. The ceremonial county of Dorset is divided between two unitary authorities: Bournemouth, Christchurch and Poole Council, which in the 2021 census had a usual resident population of 400,195; and Dorset Council, which had a usual resident population of 379,580. In the 2021 census, the ethnic composition of the ceremonial county of Dorset comprised: 94.1% White; 2.3% Asian; 0.7% Black; 2.0% Mixed; and 0.9% Other.

- White (94.1%): English; Welsh; Scottish; Northern Irish or British (88.0%); Irish (0.6%); Gypsy or Irish Traveller (0.1%); Roma (0.1%); and Other White (5.3%).
- Asian (2.3%): Indian (0.7%); Pakistani (0.1%); Bangladeshi (0.2%); Chinese (0.4%); and Other Asian (0.8%).
- Black (0.7%): African (0.4%); Caribbean (0.2%); and Other Black (0.1%).
- Mixed (2.0%): White and Asian (0.6%); White and Black African (0.3%); White and Black Caribbean (0.5%); and Other Mixed or Multiple ethnic groups (0.6%).
- Other (0.9%): Arab (0.2%) and Any other ethnic group (0.7%).

Sub-group totals may not sum exactly to the group total due to rounding. Data for the ceremonial county are aggregated from its constituent unitary authorities.

Ethnic groups in Dorset (ceremonial county)
Ethnic group	2001 census	2011 census	2021 census
White	98.1%	95.9%	94.1%
Asian (Note: The 2001 census figures for 'Asian' and 'Other' have been adjusted to reflect the 2011 reclassification of the Chinese ethnic group from 'Other' to 'Asian' to allow comparison across census years.)	0.7%	1.9%	2.3%
Black	0.2%	0.4%	0.7%
Mixed	0.7%	1.3%	2.0%
Other	0.3%	0.3%	0.9%

Religion in Dorset (ceremonial county) (2021 United Kingdom census)
1. Christianity (49.1%)
2. No religion (41.2%)
3. Islam (1.10%)
4. Buddhism (0.50%)
5. Hinduism (0.50%)
6. Judaism (0.30%)
7. Sikhism (0.00%)
8. Other religion (0.70%)
9. Not stated (6.70%)

In the 2021 census, the religious composition of the ceremonial county of Dorset comprised: 49.1% Christian; 41.2% no religion; 1.1% Muslim; 0.5% Buddhist; 0.5% Hindu; 0.3 Jewish; 0.0% Sikh; 0.7% Other religion; and 6.7% Not stated.

Religion in Dorset (ceremonial county)
Religion	2001 census	2011 census	2021 census
Christianity	75.6%	62.3%	49.1%
No religion	15.2%	27.4%	41.2%
Islam	0.4%	0.8%	1.1%
Buddhism	0.2%	0.4%	0.5%
Hinduism	0.1%	0.3%	0.5%
Judaism	0.4%	0.3%	0.3%
Sikhism	0.0%	0.0%	0.0%
Other religion	0.4%	0.6%	0.7%
Not stated	7.7%	7.9%	6.7%

Dorset's population has a high proportion of older people and a lower than average proportion of young people: According to 2013 mid-year estimates, (Note: 2013 figures are mid year estimates produced by the ONS. Taking the 2011 census as a starting point, each year, the previous year's population is aged by one year, births and deaths are added and removed respectively whilst those leaving the county are subtracted and those moving in are added, each according to age and gender.) 23.6% are over 65 years of age, higher than the England and Wales average of 17.4%, and 18.6% are less than 17 years old, lower than the England and Wales average of 21.3%. The working age population (females and males between 16 and 64) is lower than England and Wales average, 60% compared to 64%. Data collected between 2010 and 2012 shows that average life expectancy at birth in the county is 85.3 years for females and 81.2 years for males. This compares favourably with the averages for England and Wales of 82.9 and 79.1 years respectively.

More than 33% of the county's population possess a level 4 qualification or above, such as a Higher National Diploma, Degree or a Higher Degree; while nearly 6.3% have no qualifications at all. Almost 43.7% are employed in a professional or technical capacity (Standard Occupational Classification 2010, groups 1–3), just over 10.3% are administrators or secretaries (group 4), around 12.8% have a skilled trade (group 5), over 18% are employed at a low-level in the care, leisure, sales or customer relations sector (groups 6 and 7) and 14.8% are operatives or in elementary occupations (groups 8 and 9).

Historical population of Dorset non-metropolitan county

Year	Pop.	±% p.a.
1801	101,857	—
1811	112,930	+1.04%
1821	129,210	+1.36%
1831	143,443	+1.05%
1841	161,617	+1.20%
1851	169,699	+0.49%

Year	Pop.	±% p.a.
1861	174,255	+0.27%
1871	178,813	+0.26%
1881	183,371	+0.25%
1891	188,700	+0.29%
1901	188,263	−0.02%
1911	190,940	+0.14%

Year	Pop.	±% p.a.
1921	193,543	+0.14%
1931	198,105	+0.23%
1941	214,700	+0.81%
1951	233,206	+0.83%
1961	259,751	+1.08%
1971	292,811	+1.21%

Year	Pop.	±% p.a.
1981	321,676	+0.94%
1991	366,681	+1.32%
2001	390,986	+0.64%
2011	412,905	+0.55%

Statistics for the area that comprised the 1997–2009 non-metropolitan county (i.e. Dorset ceremonial county minus the boroughs of Bournemouth and Poole)
Source: Great Britain Historical GIS.

== Politics ==
=== Local government ===
Local government in Dorset consists of two unitary authorities (UA): Bournemouth, Christchurch and Poole (BCP) Council, which governs the major conurbation comprising the three towns; and Dorset Council which serves the more rural remainder of the county. For the BCP council, voters choose 76 councillors from 33 wards, with ten wards returning three candidates apiece and 23 wards, two. Dorset elects 82 councillors representing six three-councillor wards, 18 two-councillor wards and 28 single-councillor wards – 52 wards in total. In both authorities, elections for the entire council occur every four years.

The two authorities came into existence on 1 April 2019, when Bournemouth and Poole merged with Christchurch, one of six second-tier districts previously governed by Dorset County Council, leaving the other five districts – Weymouth and Portland, West Dorset, North Dorset, Purbeck and East Dorset – to form a second UA. Dorset County Council was first formed in 1888 by an act of government to govern the newly created administrative county of Dorset which had been based largely on the historic county borders. Dorset became a two-tier non-metropolitan county after a reorganisation of local government in 1974 and its border was extended eastwards to incorporate the former Hampshire towns of Bournemouth and Christchurch. (Note: Alterations to Dorset's boundary prior to 1974 have been comparatively minor. In 1844 Stockland was transferred to Devon in exchange for Thorncombe and Holwell was gained from Somerset. In 1896 the Somerset villages of Adber, Goathill, Poyntington, Sandford Orcas, Seaborough and Trent were added in exchange for Wambrook while Chardstock, Hawkchurch and Tytherleigh were ceded to Devon.) Following a review by the Local Government Commission for England, Bournemouth and Poole each became administratively independent single-tier unitary authorities in 1997.

=== National representation ===
For representation in Parliament Dorset is divided into eight Parliamentary constituencies—five county constituencies and three borough constituencies. At the 2017 general election, the Conservative Party was dominant, taking all eight seats. The borough constituencies of Bournemouth East, Bournemouth West and Poole were traditionally Conservative safe seats and were all represented by Conservative members of parliament until the 2024 United Kingdom general election when they were all gained by Labour. The county constituencies of North Dorset and Christchurch are also represented by Conservative MPs. Between 1997 and 2019, West Dorset was represented by Conservative MP Oliver Letwin who was the Minister of State at the Cabinet Office in David Cameron's government. The seat was won by Edward Morello in the 2024.

The marginal seat of South Dorset is represented by Lloyd Hatton, who gained the seat from Conservative representative, Richard Drax, in 2024. The Mid Dorset and North Poole constituency has been represented by the Liberal Democrat MP, Vikki Slade since 2024.

In the 2024 general election, the Conservatives held two constituencies in Dorset, while the Liberal Democrats gained two and Labour gained four.

== Economy and industry ==
Dorset's employment structure (2008)^{[A]}
Industry	Dorset^{[C]}	Poole	Bournemouth	Great Britain
Manufacturing	11.9%	15.8%	3.2%	10.2%
Construction	5.3%	4.6%	3.2%	4.8%
Services	81.5%	79%	93.1%	83.5%
Tourism-related^{[B]}	10.2%	7.7%	12%	8.2%
A. Excludes self-employed, government-supported trainees and armed forces B. Includes industries that are also part of the services industry C. Excluding Poole and Bournemouth

In 2003 the gross value added (GVA) for the non-metropolitan county was £4,673 million, with an additional £4,705 million for Poole and Bournemouth. The primary sector produced 2.03% of GVA, the secondary sector produced 22.44% and 75.53% came from the tertiary sector. The average GVA for the 16 regions of South West England was £4,693 million.

The principal industry in Dorset was once agriculture. It has not, however, been the largest employer since the mid 19th century as mechanisation substantially reduced the number of workers required. Agriculture has become less profitable and the industry has declined further. Within the administrative county between 1995 and 2003, GVA for primary industry (largely agriculture, fishing and quarrying) declined from £229 million to £188 million—7.1% to 4.0%. In 2007, 2,039 km^{2} (787 sq mi) of the county was in agricultural use, up from 1,986 km^{2} (767 sq mi) in 1989, although this was due to an increase in permanent grass, and land set aside. By contrast, in the same period, arable land decreased from 993 to 916 km^{2} (383 to 354 sq mi). Excluding fowl, sheep are the most common animal stock in the county; between 1989 and 2006 their numbers fell from 252,189 to 193,500. Cattle and pig farming has declined similarly; during the same period the number of cattle fell from 240,413 to 170,700, and pigs from 169,636 to 72,700.

In 2009 there were 2,340 armed forces personnel stationed in Dorset including the Royal Armoured Corps at Bovington, Royal Signals at Blandford and the Royal Marines at Poole. The military presence has had a mixed effect on the local economy, bringing additional employment for civilians, but on occasion having a negative impact on the tourist trade, particularly when popular areas are closed for military manoeuvres.

Other major employers in the county include: BAE Systems, Sunseeker International, J.P. Morgan, Cobham plc and Bournemouth University. Dorset's three ports, Poole, Weymouth and Portland, and the smaller harbours of Christchurch, Swanage, Lyme Regis, Wareham and West Bay generate a substantial amount of international trade and tourism. Around 230 fishing vessels that predominantly catch crab and lobster are based in Dorset's ports. When the waters around Weymouth and Portland were chosen for the sailing events in the 2012 Summer Olympic Games, the area underwent an increased investment in infrastructure and a growth in the marine leisure sector. It is expected that this will continue to have a positive effect on local businesses and tourism.

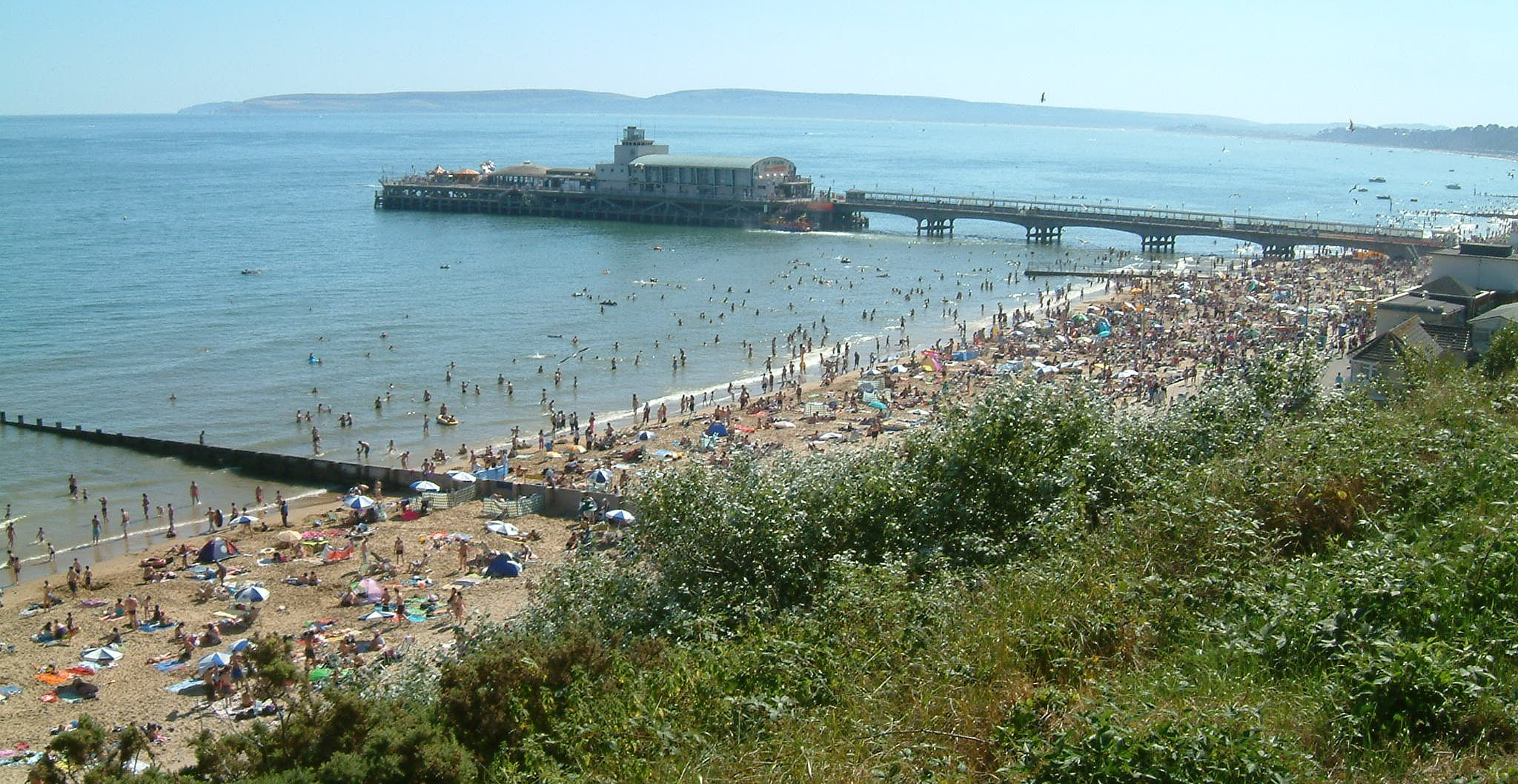
The beach near Bournemouth Pier; Dorset's coastline is a major attraction for tourists

Tourism has grown in Dorset since the late 18th century and is now the predominant industry. It is estimated that 37,500 people work in Dorset's tourism sector. Some 3.2 million British and 326,000 foreign tourists visited the county in 2008, staying a total of 15.1 million nights. In addition there were 14.6 million day visitors. The combined spending of both groups was £1,458 million. Towns received 56% of Dorset's day trippers, 27% went to the coast and 17% to the countryside. A survey carried out in 1997 concluded that the primary reason tourists were drawn to Dorset was the attractiveness of the county's coast and countryside. Numbers of domestic and foreign tourists have fluctuated in recent years due to various factors, including security and economic downturn, a trend reflected throughout the UK.

Manufacturing industry in Dorset provided 10.3% of employment in 2008. This was slightly above the average for Great Britain but below that of the South West region, which was at 10.7% for that period. The sector is the county's fourth largest employer, but a predicted decline suggests there will be 10,200 fewer jobs in manufacturing by 2026.

== Culture ==
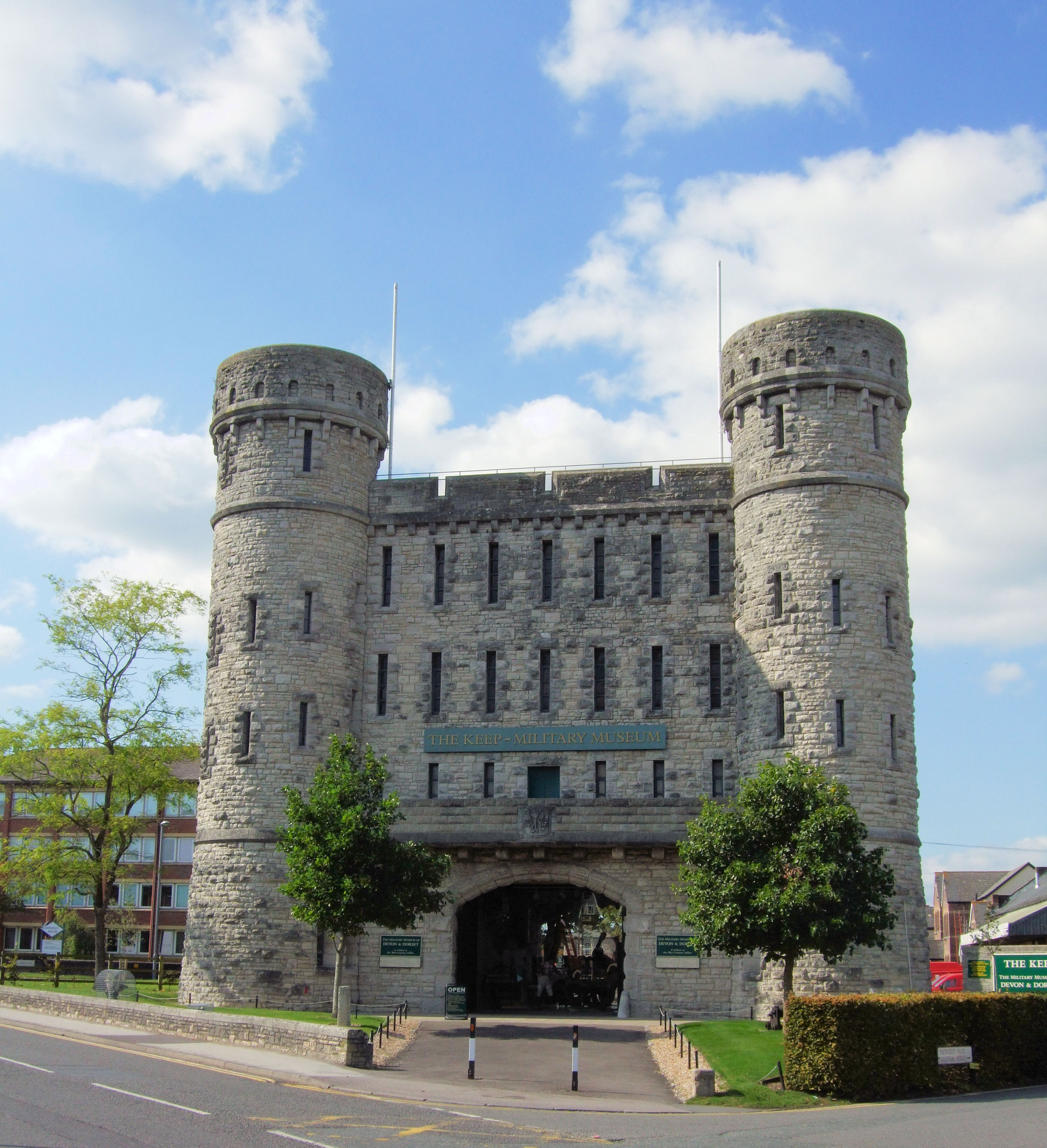
The Keep Military Museum in Dorchester

As a largely rural county, Dorset has fewer major cultural institutions than larger or more densely populated areas. Major venues for concerts and theatre include the Lighthouse arts centre in Poole; the Bournemouth International Centre, Pavilion Theatre and O2 Academy in Bournemouth; and the Pavilion theatre in Weymouth. The Bournemouth Symphony Orchestra, founded in 1893, is based in Poole.

Dorset has more than 30 general and specialist museums. The Dorset County Museum (now the Dorset Museum) in Dorchester was founded in 1846 and contains an extensive collection of exhibits covering the county's history and environment. The Tank Museum at Bovington contains more than 300 tanks and armoured vehicles from 30 nations. The museum is the largest in Dorset and its collection has been designated of national importance. Other museums which reflect the cultural heritage of the county include The Keep Military Museum in Dorchester, the Russell-Cotes Museum in Bournemouth, the Charmouth Heritage Coast Centre, Poole Museum, Portland Museum and Wareham Town Museum.

Dorset contains 190 conservation areas, more than 1,500 scheduled monuments, over 30 registered parks and gardens and 12,850 listed buildings. Grade I listed buildings include: Portland Castle, a coastal fort commissioned by Henry VIII; a castle with more than a 1,000 years of history at Corfe; a Roman ruin described by Historic England as the "only Roman town house visible in Britain"; Athelhampton, a Tudor manor house; Forde Abbey, a stately home and former Cistercian monastery; Christchurch Priory, the longest church in England; and St Edwold's church, one of the smallest.

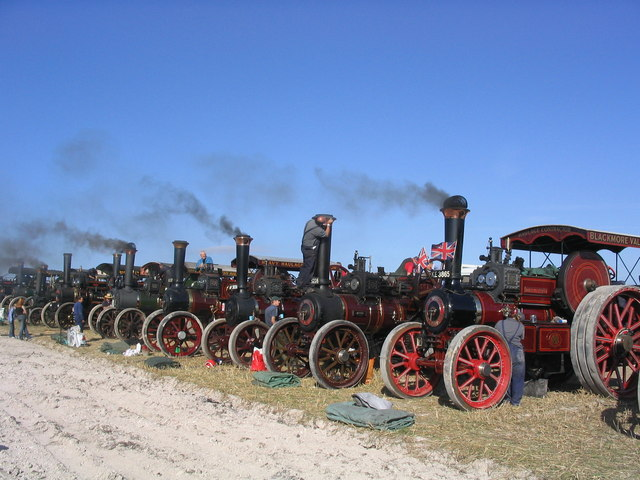
Traction engines on display at the Great Dorset Steam Fair

Dorset hosts a number of annual festivals, fairs and events including the Great Dorset Steam Fair near Blandford, one of the largest events of its kind in Europe, and the Bournemouth Air Festival, a free air show that attracted 1.3 million visitors in 2009. The Spirit of the Seas is a maritime festival held in Weymouth and Portland. Launched in 2008, the festival features sporting activities, cultural events and local entertainers. The Dorset County Show, which was first held in 1841, is a celebration of Dorset's agriculture. The two-day event exhibits local produce and livestock and attracts some 55,000 people. Inside Out Dorset is an outdoor arts festival that takes place every two years in rural and urban locations across Dorset. In addition to the smaller folk festivals held in towns such as Christchurch and Wimborne, Dorset holds several larger musical events such as Camp Bestival, End of the Road and the Larmer Tree Festival.

Dorset's only professional football club is AFC Bournemouth, which plays in the Premier League—the highest division in the English football league system. Non-League semi-professional teams in the county include Southern Premier Division teams Dorchester Town F.C., Poole Town F.C. and Weymouth F.C. Dorset County Cricket Club competes in the Minor Counties Cricket Championship and is based at Dean Park Cricket Ground in Bournemouth. Poole Stadium hosts regular greyhound racing and is the home to top-flight speedway team Poole Pirates. The county's coastline, on the English Channel, is noted for its watersports (particularly sailing, gig racing, windsurfing, power boating and kayaking) which take advantage of the sheltered waters in the bays of Weymouth and Poole, and the harbours of Poole and Portland. Dorset hosted the sailing events at the 2012 Summer Olympics and 2012 Summer Paralympics at the Weymouth and Portland National Sailing Academy. The venue was completed in May 2009 and was used by international sailing teams in preparation for the Games. In motorsport, Dorset hosts the Extreme E Jurassic X Prix at Bovington Camp.

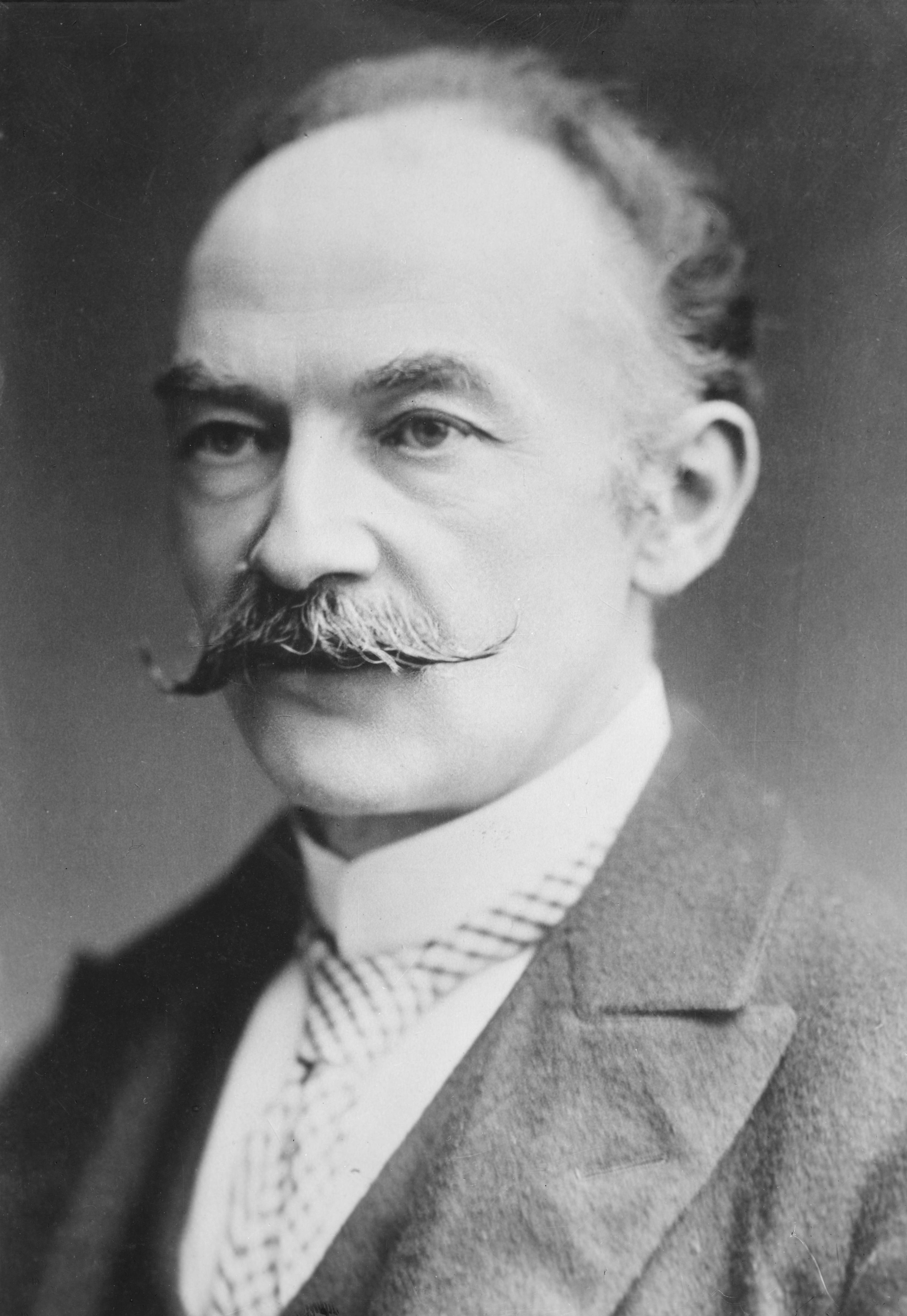
Thomas Hardy

Dorset is famed in literature for being the native county of author and poet Thomas Hardy, and many of the places he describes in his novels in the fictional Wessex are in Dorset, which he renamed South Wessex. For example, Dorchester is renamed to Casterbridge in The Mayor of Casterbridge (1886). The National Trust owns Thomas Hardy's Cottage, in Higher Bockhampton, east of Dorchester; and Max Gate, his former house in Dorchester. Several other writers have called Dorset home, including Douglas Adams, who wrote much of The Hitchhiker's Guide to the Galaxy while he lived in Stalbridge; John le Carré, author of espionage novels, born in Poole; Tom Sharpe of Wilt fame lived in Bridport; John Fowles (The French Lieutenant's Woman) lived in Lyme Regis before he died in 2005; T.F. Powys lived in Chaldon Herring for over 20 years and used it as inspiration for the fictitious village of Folly Down in his novel Mr. Weston's Good Wine; John Cowper Powys, his elder brother, also set a number of his works in Dorset, such as the novels Maiden Castle and Weymouth Sands. Children's author Enid Blyton drew inspiration for many of her works from Dorset. The 19th-century poet William Barnes was born in Bagber and wrote many poems in his native Dorset dialect. Originating from the ancient Norse and Saxon languages, the dialect was prevalent across the Blackmore Vale but has fallen into disuse.

Flag of Dorset

Dorset's flag, which is known as the Dorset Cross or St Wite's Cross, was adopted in 2008 following a public competition organised by Dorset County Council. The winning design, which features a white cross with a red border on a golden background, attracted 54% of the vote. All three colours are used in Dorset County Council's coat of arms and the red and white was used in recognition of the English flag. The golden colour represents Dorset's sandy beaches and the Dorset landmarks of Golden Cap and Gold Hill. It is also a reference to the Wessex Dragon, a symbol of the Saxon Kingdom which Dorset once belonged to, and the gold wreath featured on the badge of the Dorset Regiment.

== Transport ==
Dorset is connected to London by two main line railways. The West of England line runs through the north of the county at Gillingham and Sherborne. Running west from London Waterloo to Exeter St Davids in Devon, it provides a service for those who live in the western districts of Dorset. The South West Main Line runs through the south via Bournemouth, Poole, and Dorchester to its terminus at Weymouth. Additionally, the Heart of Wessex Line runs north from Weymouth to Bristol and Gloucester. The Swanage Railway, a heritage steam and diesel railway, runs the 10 kilometres (6 mi) between Norden and Swanage.

Dorset is one of few English counties not well served by canals, and has no motorways. The A303, A35 and A31 trunk roads run through the county. The A303, which connects the West Country to London via the M3, clips the north-west of the county. The A35 crosses the county in a west–east direction from Honiton in Devon, via Bridport, Dorchester, Poole, Bournemouth and Christchurch, to Southampton in Hampshire. The A31 connects to the A35 at Bere Regis, and passes east through Wimborne and Ferndown to Hampshire, where it later becomes the M27. Other main roads in the county include the A338, A354, A37 and A350. The A338 heads north from Bournemouth to Ringwood (Hampshire) and on to Salisbury (Wiltshire) and beyond. The A354 also connects to Salisbury after travelling north-east from Weymouth in the south of the county. The A37 travels north-west from Dorchester to Yeovil in Somerset. The A350 also leads north, from Poole through Blandford and Shaftesbury, to Warminster in Wiltshire.

A passenger seaport and an international airport are situated in the county. Brittany Ferries operates out of Poole Harbour, providing access to Guernsey as well as to Cherbourg and St Malo in France. Poole and Portland harbours are capable of taking cruise liners. Bournemouth Airport, on the edge of Hurn village 6 kilometres (4 mi) north of Bournemouth, has scheduled and charter flights.

Morebus and Damory provide a county-wide bus network with frequent services linking major towns, including Bournemouth, Poole and Wimborne, and a varied service in further rural locations. First Group operate buses in the Weymouth and Bridport area, including a regular route along the A35 from Weymouth to Axminster, which helps to compensate for the missing rail link west of Dorchester; and the Jurassic Coaster service, which runs along the county's coastline. Yellow Buses provided bus services within Bournemouth and outlying areas until they ceased operating in 2022.

== Religious sites ==
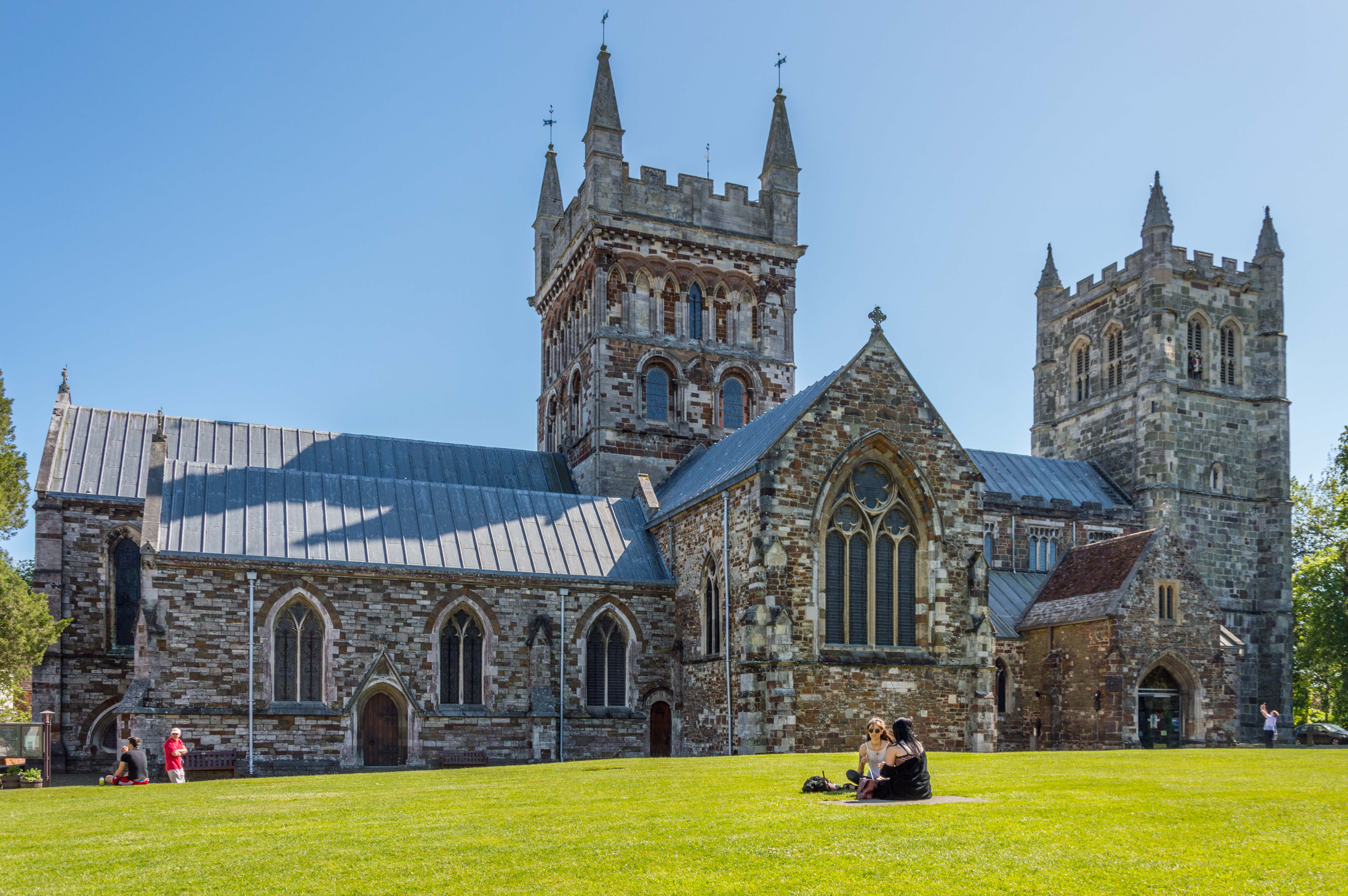
Wimborne Minster

Unlike all of its neighbouring counties, Dorset does not have a cathedral. Over 95% of the county falls within the Church of England Diocese of Salisbury. A small section to the west comes under the Diocese of Bath and Wells and to the east Christchurch and much of Bournemouth—both historically part of Hampshire—belong to the Diocese of Winchester. The Roman Catholic Diocese of Plymouth incorporates most of Dorset with the exception of Christchurch and a portion of Bournemouth which belongs to the Diocese of Portsmouth. Few purpose-built places of worship exist in Dorset for faiths other than Christianity. In 2008 a Hindu temple was constructed in Blandford Forum for the Gurkhas based at the town's military camp. Bournemouth, which contains a higher proportion of Jewish residents than the national average, has three synagogues, while an Islamic Centre and a mosque cater for Muslims.

Christianity was introduced to Dorset by the Romans. A 4th century Roman mosaic discovered near Hinton St Mary contains what is generally accepted to be an image of Christ. Christianity became firmly established in the county during the Saxon period although there are few surviving Saxon churches; the most complete is St. Martin's in Wareham which has features from the early 11th century. Mediaeval churches are more prevalent in Dorset; most are 15th century and are of a Perpendicular style. Sherborne Abbey, one of the county's largest, is noted for its broad fan vaulting added during an extensive 15th century rebuild. Founded in AD 705 by Aldhelm, the Abbey contained the chair of the Bishop of Sherborne and was granted cathedral status until 1075 when the diocese was transferred to Old Sarum. Wimborne Minster features a chained library and a 14th-century astronomical clock; Christchurch Priory is renowned for its miraculous beam which, according to legend, was installed by Christ; and the 15th century roof spanning the nave at St John the Baptist Church in Bere Regis is described by architectural historian Nikolaus Pevsner as the "finest timber roof of Dorset". Saint Wite's shrine is located in the north transept of St Candida and Holy Cross at Whitchurch Canonicorum. It is the only church in the country, besides Westminster Abbey, to have a surviving mediaeval shrine that contains the relics of a saint.

Monastic foundations were once abundant in Dorset, but all ceased to exist at the Dissolution of the monasteries. The Reformation and the political and religious turmoil that ensued largely checked the building of new churches until the turn of the 18th century. Notable examples of Early Georgian churches include the Bastard brothers' Church of St. Peter and St. Paul in Blandford Forum, and St George's Church on the Isle of Portland, which has a steeple and tower inspired by the works of Christopher Wren. From the late 18th century onwards, churches in Dorset tended towards a Gothic Revival style. A notable exception to this trend, however, is the Church of St Mary in East Lulworth—the first freestanding Roman Catholic church built in England after the Reformation. George III gave permission to erect the building on the condition that it resembled a garden mausoleum rather than a church. It was completed in 1789. Bournemouth, founded in 1810, has a wealth of 19th-century churches including St Peter's and St Stephen's. St Dunstan's (formerly St Osmund's) in Poole is one of a small number of 20th-century churches in Dorset. The final major work of Edward Schroeder Prior, it is one of the last examples of the Neo Byzantine style. The Church of St Nicholas and St Magnus in Moreton is noted for its elaborate engraved glass windows designed by Laurence Whistler. Severely damaged by a stray German bomb in 1940, the church subsequently underwent extensive renovation and Whistler had replaced every window by 1984.

== Education ==
Responsibility for state schools in Dorset is divided between two local education authorities: Dorset Council, which covers the majority of the county, and Bournemouth, Christchurch and Poole (BCP) Council. Most of the Dorset Council area operates a two-tier comprehensive system whereby pupils attend a primary school before completing their education at secondary school but Corfe Mullen, Dorchester, Ferndown and West Moors maintain a three-tier system (first, middle and high school). Bournemouth operates a two-tier system; Poole operates two and three-tier systems. BCP is one of the few local authorities in England to maintain selective education, containing four single-sex grammar schools which select pupils on the basis of an eleven-plus examination. Some of the county's schools are academies—self-governing state schools that have become independent of their local education authority and are maintained directly by the Department for Education. In 2017, the Progress 8 score for schools in the Dorset Council area was ranked below average, and 39.6% of pupils gained at least Grade 5 or above in English and maths GCSEs matching the national average of 39.6%. Poole recorded an above average Progress 8 score and 54% of pupils achieved Grade 5 or above in English and maths GCSEs. Bournemouth was ranked as average and 47.8% of pupils achieved Grade 5 or above in English and maths GCSEs.

Dorset contains a range of privately funded independent schools. Many are boarding schools which also take day pupils, such as the co-educational Canford School which is built around a 19th-century Grade I listed manor house; and Sherborne School, a boys' school founded in the 16th century.

Four of the county's five largest towns contain a further education college: Weymouth College, Kingston Maurward College in Dorchester and Bournemouth and Poole College which is one of the largest in the UK. Dorset has two higher education establishments situated in the heart of the county's south east conurbation. Bournemouth University has facilities across Bournemouth and Poole and over 17,000 students. Previously named Bournemouth Polytechnic, it was granted university status as a result of the Further and Higher Education Act 1992. The Arts University Bournemouth is situated between the border of Poole and Bournemouth. It became a higher education institute in 2001 and was given degree-awarding powers in 2008. It was granted full university status in 2012.

== See also ==
- Custos Rotulorum of Dorset – list of keepers of the rolls for Dorset
- Dorset Police and Crime Commissioner
- Dorset heraldry
