= List of schools in Dorset =

Schools in Dorset, England include state schools under the local education authorities, most of which operate a two-tier comprehensive system whereby pupils attend a primary school before completing their education at secondary school. Some of the county's schools are academies—self-governing state schools which have become independent of their local education authority and are maintained directly by the Department for Education.

Dorset also contains a range of privately funded independent schools. Many are boarding schools which also take day pupils, such as the co-educational Canford School which is built around a 19th-century Grade I listed manor house; and Sherborne School, a boys' school founded in the 16th century.

Four of the county's five largest towns contain a further education college: Weymouth College, Kingston Maurward College in Dorchester and Bournemouth and Poole College which is one of the largest in the UK. Dorset has two higher education establishments situated in the heart of the county's south east conurbation. Bournemouth University has facilities across Bournemouth and Poole and over 17,000 students.

== State-funded schools ==
=== Primary and first schools ===
- The Abbey CE Primary School, Shaftesbury
- All Saints CE Primary School, Bishops Caundle
- Archbishop Wake CE Primary School, Blandford Forum
- Atlantic Academy Portland, Isle of Portland
- Beaminster St Mary's Academy, Beaminster
- Beechcroft St Pauls CE Primary School, Weymouth
- Bere Regis Primary and Pre-School, Bere Regis
- Bincombe Valley Primary School, Littlemoor
- Blandford St Mary CE Primary School, Blandford St Mary
- Bovington Academy, Bovington Camp
- Bridport Primary School, Bridport
- Bridport St Mary's CE Primary School, Bridport
- Broadmayne First School, Broadmayne
- Broadwindsor CE Primary School, Broadwindsor
- Buckland Newton CE Primary School, Buckland Newton
- Burton Bradstock CE School, Burton Bradstock
- Cerne Abbas CE First School, Cerne Abbas
- Charmouth Primary School, Charmouth
- Cheselbourne Village School, Cheselbourne
- Chickerell Primary Academy, Chickerell
- Colehill First School, Colehill
- Conifers Primary School, Westhaven, Weymouth
- Corfe Castle CE Primary School, Corfe Castle
- Cranborne CE First School, Cranborne
- Damers First School, Poundbury
- Downlands Community School, Blandford Camp
- Dunbury CE Academy, Winterborne Whitechurch
- Durweston CE Primary School, Durweston
- Ferndown First School, Ferndown
- Frome Valley CE First School, Crossways
- Gillingham Primary School, Gillingham
- Greenford CE Primary School, Maiden Newton
- Hampreston CE First School, Hampreston
- Hayeswood First School, Colehill
- Hazelbury Bryan Primary School, Hazelbury Bryan
- Henbury View First School, Corfe Mullen
- Hillside Community First School, Verwood
- Holy Trinity CE Primary School, Weymouth
- Loders CE Primary Academy, Loders
- Lulworth and Winfrith CE Primary School, West Lulworth
- Lytchett Matravers Primary School, Lytchett Matravers
- Manor Park CE VC First School, Dorchester
- Marshwood CE Primary Academy, Marshwood
- Milborne St Andrew First School, Milborne St Andrew
- Milldown CE Academy, Blandford Forum
- Milton-On-Stour CE Primary School, Milton on Stour
- Motcombe CE Primary School, Motcombe
- Oakhurst Community First School, West Moors
- Pamphill First School, Pamphill
- Parley First School, Ferndown
- Parrett and Axe CE Primary School, Mosterton
- Piddle Valley CE First School, Piddletrenthide
- Pimperne CE Primary School, Pimperne
- Portesham CE Primary School, Portesham
- Powerstock CE Primary School, Powerstock
- The Prince of Wales School, Poundbury
- Puddletown CE First School, Puddletown
- Radipole Primary School, Weymouth
- Rushcombe First School, Corfe Mullen
- St Andrew's CE Primary School, Fontmell Magna
- St Andrew's CE Primary School, Preston
- St Andrew's CE Primary School, Yetminster
- St Augustine's RC Primary School, Weymouth
- St Catherine's RC Primary School, Bridport
- St George's CE Primary School, Langton Matravers
- St Georges CE School, Bourton
- St George's Community Primary School, Portland
- St Gregory's CE Primary School, Marnhull
- St Ives Primary School, St Ives
- St James' CE First School, Alderholt
- St James' CE First School, Gaunt's Common
- St John's CE First School, Wimborne Minster
- St John's CE Primary School, Weymouth
- St Mark's CE Primary School, Swanage
- St Mary and St Joseph's RC Primary School, Wool
- St Mary the Virgin CE Primary School, Gillingham
- St Mary's CE First School, Charminster
- St Mary's CE First School, West Moors
- St Mary's CE Primary School, Bradford Abbas
- St Mary's CE Primary Academy, Thorncombe
- St Mary's RC First School, Dorchester
- St Mary's RC Primary School, Marnhull
- St Mary's RC Primary School, Swanage
- St Michael's CE Primary School, Lyme Regis
- St Nicholas & St Laurence CE Primary School, Broadwey
- St Nicholas CE Primary School, Child Okeford
- Salway Ash CE Primary School, Salway Ash
- Sandford St Martin's CE First School, Sandford
- Shaftesbury CE Primary School, Shaftesbury
- Sherborne Abbey CE Primary School, Sherborne
- Sherborne Primary School, Sherborne
- Shillingstone CE Primary School, Shillingstone
- Sixpenney Handley First School, Sixpenny Handley
- Southill Primary School, Weymouth
- Spetisbury CE Primary School, Spetisbury
- Stalbridge CE Primary School, Stalbridge
- Sticklands CE Primary School, Evershot
- Stoborough CE VA School, Stoborough
- Stower Provost Community School, Stour Provost
- Sturminster Marshall First School, Sturminster Marshall
- Swanage Primary School, Swanage
- Symondsbury CE Primary School, Symondsbury
- Thorner's CE School, Litton Cheney
- Thornford CE Primary School, Thornford
- Three Legged Cross First School, Three Legged Cross
- Trent Young's CE Primary School, Trent
- Trinity CE First School, Verwood
- Upton Infant School, Upton
- Upton Junior School, Upton
- Verwood CE First School, Verwood
- Wareham St Mary CE Primary School, Wareham
- William Barnes Primary School, Sturminster
- Wimborne First School, Wimborne
- Wimborne St Giles CE First School, Wimborne St Giles
- Winterbourne Valley CE First School, Winterbourne Abbas
- Witchampton CE First School, Witchampton
- Wool CE Primary School, Wool
- Wyke Primary School, Gillingham
- Wyke Regis CE Junior School, Wyke Regis
- Wyke Regis Infant School and Nursery, Wyke Regis

=== Middle schools ===
- Allenbourn Middle School, Wimborne Minster
- Cranborne Middle School, Cranborne
- Dorchester Middle School, Dorchester
- Emmanuel Church of England Middle School, Verwood
- Ferndown Middle School, Ferndown
- Lockyer's Middle School, Corfe Mullen
- St Mary's Church of England Middle School, Puddletown
- St Michael's Church of England Middle School, Colehill
- St Osmund's Church of England Middle School, Dorchester
- West Moors Middle School, West Moors

=== Secondary and upper schools ===
- All Saints Church of England Academy, Wyke Regis
- Atlantic Academy Portland, Isle of Portland
- Beaminster School, Beaminster
- The Blandford School, Blandford Forum
- Budmouth Academy, Chickerell
- Dorset Studio School, Dorchester
- Ferndown Upper School, Ferndown
- Gillingham School, Gillingham
- The Gryphon School, Sherborne
- Lytchett Minster School, Lytchett Minster
- The Purbeck School, Wareham
- Queen Elizabeth's School, Pamphill
- Shaftesbury School, Shaftesbury
- The Sir John Colfox Academy, Bridport
- Sturminster Newton High School, Sturminster Newton
- The Swanage School, Swanage
- The Thomas Hardye School, Dorchester
- Wey Valley Academy, Weymouth
- The Woodroffe School, Lyme Regis

=== Special and alternative schools ===
- Beaucroft Foundation School, Colehill
- The Compass, Weymouth
- Dorchester Learning Centre, Winterborne Monkton
- The Forum Centre, Blandford Forum
- Harbour School Dorset, Bovington Camp
- Harbour Vale School, Sherborne
- Mountjoy School, Beaminster
- Westfield Arts College, Preston
- Wyvern Academy, Weymouth
- Yewstock School, Sturminster Newton

=== Further education ===
- Kingston Maurward College, Dorchester
- Weymouth College, Weymouth

== Independent schools ==
=== Primary and preparatory schools ===
- Castle Court School, Corfe Mullen
- Dumpton School, Wimborne Minster
- Hanford School, Child Okeford
- Knighton House School, Durweston
- Port Regis School, Motcombe
- Sherborne Preparatory School, Sherborne
- Sunninghill Preparatory School, Dorchester
- Thornlow Preparatory School, Weymouth
- Yarrells Preparatory School, Upton

=== Senior and all-through schools ===
- Bryanston School, Bryanston
- Clayesmore School, Iwerne Minster
- Leweston School, Sherborne
- Milton Abbey School, Milton Abbas
- Ringwood Waldorf School, Ashley
- Sherborne School, Sherborne
- Sherborne School for Girls, Sherborne

=== Special and alternative schools ===
- Arbour House School, Weymouth
- The Beeches School, Cranborne
- The Forum School, Shillingstone
- Graduately-Developing-Futures, Lytchett Matravers
- The Luccombe Hub, Milton Abbas
- Sheiling School, Ashley Heath

== See also ==
- List of English and Welsh endowed schools (19th century)#Dorset
