= Sturminster Newton (disambiguation) =

Sturminster Newton is a town in Dorset, England.

Sturminster Newton may also refer to the following things associated with it:

- Sturminster Newton High School
- Sturminster Newton (ward), the electoral division based on the town
- Sturminster Newton Hundred, the ancient administrative area based on the town
- Sturminster Newton railway station
- Sturminster Newton United F.C.
