= Okeford Fitzpaine =

Village and civil parish in Dorset, England

Coordinates: 50.8981°N 2.2768°W

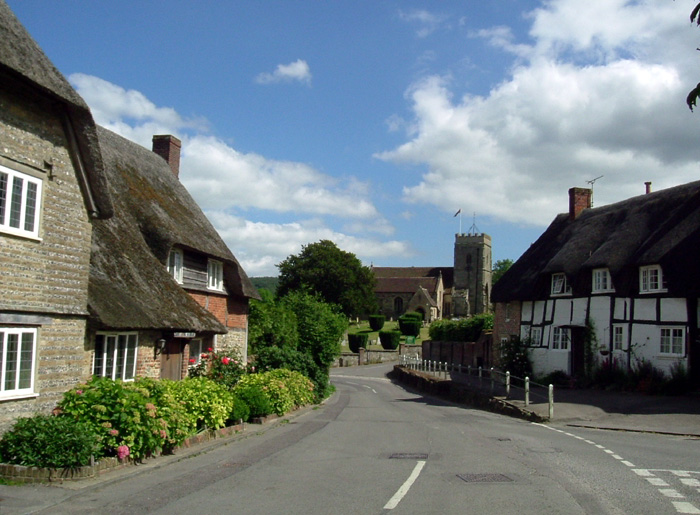
- Looking towards the parish church

- Location within Dorset
- Population: 1,000 (2021)
- OS grid reference: ST806110
- Unitary authority: Dorset
- Ceremonial county: Dorset
- Region: South West
- Country: England
- Sovereign state: United Kingdom
- Post town: Blandford Forum
- Postcode district: DT11
- Police: Dorset
- Fire: Dorset and Wiltshire
- Ambulance: South Western
- UK Parliament: North Dorset

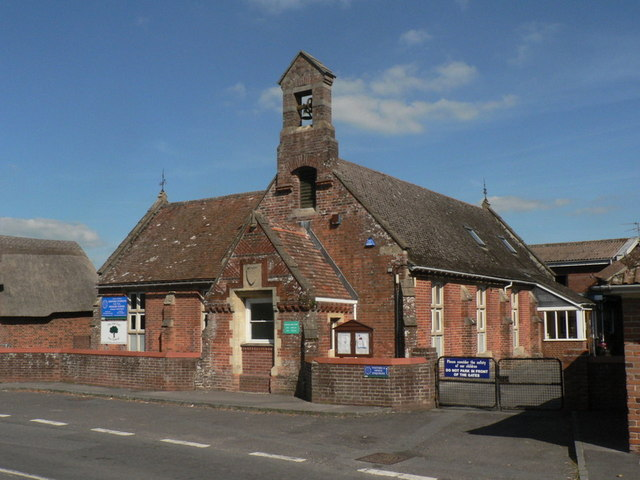
Village primary school

Okeford Fitzpaine /ˈoʊkfərd fɪtsˈpeɪn/ is a village and civil parish in the English county of Dorset, situated in the Blackmore Vale three miles (five kilometres) south of the town of Sturminster Newton. It is sited on a thin strip of greensand under the scarp face of the Dorset Downs. The parish includes the village of Belchalwell to the west and most of the hamlet of Fiddleford to the north, and at the 2021 census had a population of 1,000 people in 447 households.

== History ==
Prehistoric remains within the parish include three cross dykes and five round barrows on the chalk hills south of the village, and an Iron Age hillfort on Banbury Hill, towards Sturminster Newton. Banbury covers about 3 acres (1.2 hectares) and is of univallate (single rampart) construction, though its defences have been reduced by cultivation.

In 1086 in the Domesday Book Okeford Fitzpaine was recorded as Adford; it had 40 households, 16 ploughlands, 21 acres (8.5 hectares) of meadow and one mill. It was in Sturminster Newton Hundred and the tenant-in-chief was Glastonbury Abbey. Since then it has been known as "Aukford Alured" and "Ockford Phippin", the latter echoing the modern colloquial "Fippenny Ockford" and its shorthand, "Ockford".

The present parish of Okeford Fitzpaine includes several areas that used to be within other parishes: Banbury Common (formerly in Child Okeford parish), the centre of the old parish of Belchalwell (plus four of its five separated parts), and part of Fiddleford (east of the Darknoll Brook). Until 1966 almost the entire village was owned by the Pitt-Rivers family, so it has no manor house, and comprised mostly tenant farmers. The village was sold off at auction by his mistress Stella Lonsdale following the death in 1966 of George Pitt-Rivers, who specified that the estate not be sold as such, but that each property be sold individually, so that existing tenants might buy their leased farms.

== Governance ==
At the lower tier of local government, Okeford Fitzpaine is a civil parish with a parish council. The first meeting of the parish council took place on 1 January 1895.

Okeford Fitzpaine falls within the unitary authority area of Dorset. For elections to Dorset Council, it is part of Blackmore Vale electoral ward. Historically, the parish was part of Sturminster rural district from 1894 until 1974, and then North Dorset district until Dorset became a unitary district in the 2019 local government changes.

In the United Kingdom national parliament, Okeford Fitzpaine is in the North Dorset parliamentary constituency which is represented by Simon Hoare of the Conservative party.

== Demographics ==
Census population of Okeford Fitzpaine parish
Census	Population	Female	Male	Households	Source
1921	652				
1931	580				
1951	625				
1961	619				
1971	580				
1981	630				
1991	640				
2001	979	481	498	376	
2011	913	464	449	380	
2021	1,000	517	483	447	

== Education ==
There is a small Church of England voluntary aided primary school. The school was virtually destroyed by fire during World War II, and many village records were lost. There is also a pre-school.

== Notable buildings ==
Within the parish are 61 structures that are listed by Historic England for their historic or architectural interest. Two of these – the Parish Church of St Andrew and the Church of St Aldhelm – have grade II* status, with all other listed structures being grade II. Among these are a barn off High Street; a green-painted K6 telephone kiosk by the post office; 50 metres (160 feet) of raised pavement in Shillingstone Lane; a table tomb in St Andrew's churchyard; and another in St Aldhelm's churchyard.

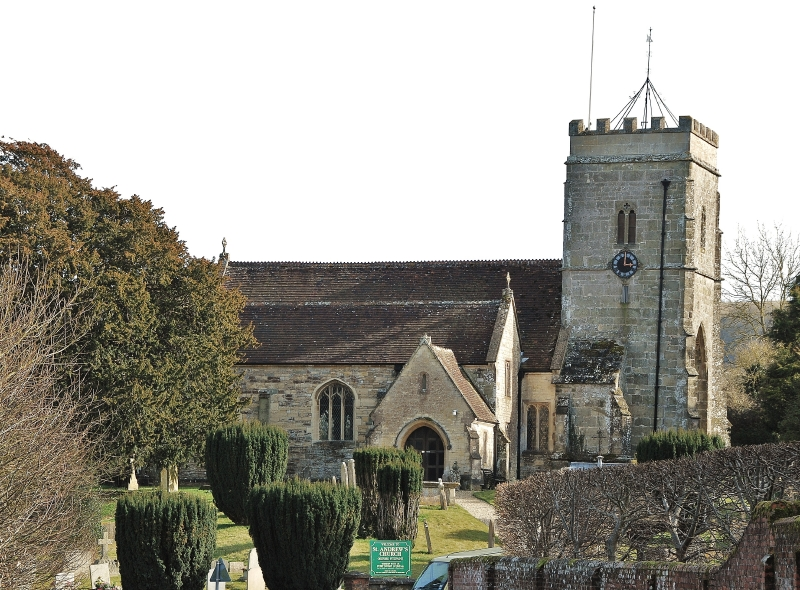
Parish Church of St Andrew

The Parish Church of St Andrew is built from greensand and Marnhull limestone and has a 14th-century tower arch and west window, a mid-15th-century west tower, and a 19th-century chancel. The aisles and nave are also 19th century, though they incorporate some 15th-century elements. The pulpit is 15th century, albeit much restored.

The Church of St Aldhelm, formerly the parish church of Belchalwell, is in the southwestern part of the parish. The nave has late-12th-century origins, though only part of the south wall remains from this date. The south doorway is well preserved, dating to about 1190, and is ornamented with chevron and dog-tooth patterning. The north aisle, chancel, south tower and south porch are 15th-century additions, though at the end of the 19th century the east wall of the chancel and all the north aisle were largely rebuilt, as were the west walls of the nave and south porch.

The Old Rectory has a main block that was probably built in the mid 18th century by the Rev Duke Butler; it has a symmetrical five-bay east front comprising rendered walls above ashlar and rubble plinths. An earlier brick-walled kitchen wing to the northwest has a large fireplace with a chamfered bressummer.

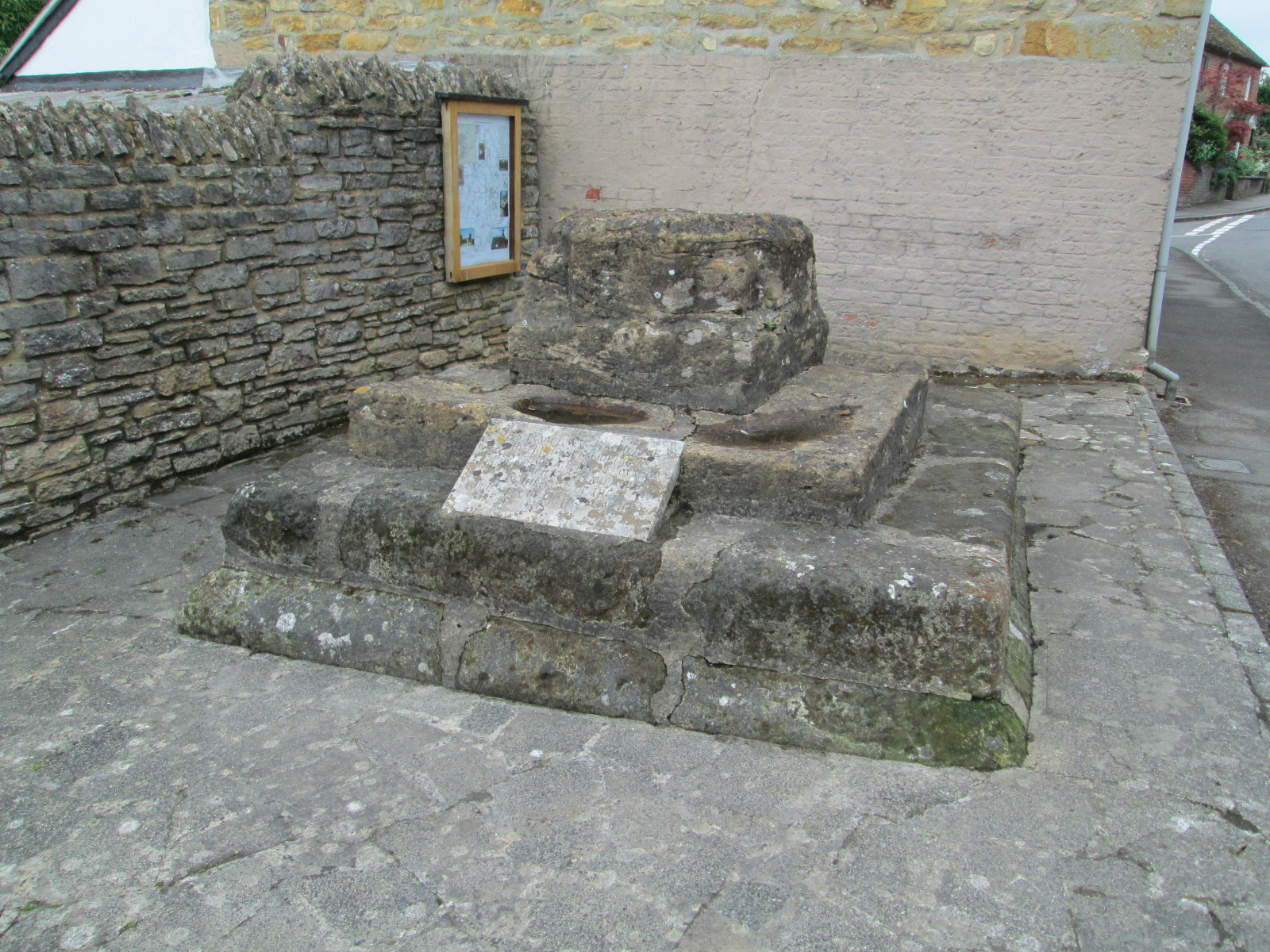
The market cross

There is what remains of a Cross of ashlar, that comprises two square steps under a chamfered plinth, on which stands an octagonal cross-base, chamfered on top, with broach stops occupying the corners of the square. The tenon of the cross-shaft still lodges in a square mortice at the centre of the octagon, but the rest has gone.

== Community facilities ==
Okeford Fitzpaine has a village hall, which can cater for conferences of up to 140 people and parties of up to 200; it has full facilities for people with disabilities. The village also has The Royal Oak public house and a village post office and shop, "The Okeford Stores".

== People ==
In 2015 the village had 333 houses, with 33 more under construction on land once occupied by Phillips's Hillview Dairy. Plans are being formulated for perhaps another 100, some on the land occupied by the defunct chicken farm, some on land occupied by the defunct Wessex Homes mobile home factory, and some on Pleydell's Farm in the middle of the village.

TV presenter Jack Hargreaves, known for having devised and presented How!, Out of Town and Old Country, lived at Belchalwell.
