= Girdlers Coppice =

Nature reserve in Dorset, UK

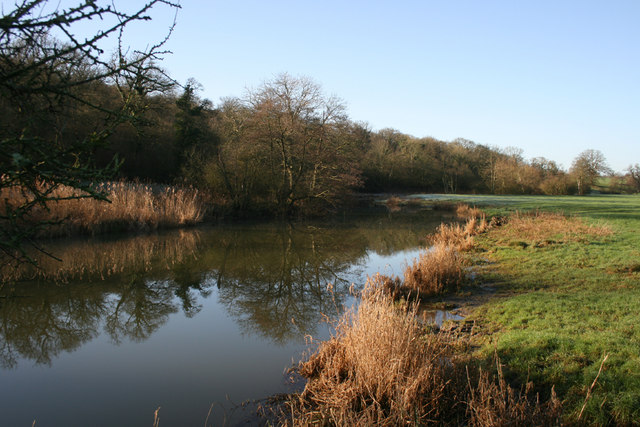
- The River Stour next to the reserve

- Location within Dorset
- Location: near Sturminster Newton
- OS grid: ST 799 134
- Coordinates: 50°55′11″N 2°17′14″W
- Area: 7 hectares (17 acres)
- Operator: Dorset Wildlife Trust
- Designation: Site of Special Scientific Interest
- Website: www.dorsetwildlifetrust.org.uk/nature-reserves/girdlers-coppice

Girdlers Coppice is a nature reserve of the Dorset Wildlife Trust, near Sturminster Newton, in Dorset, England. It is an ancient woodland, adjacent to the larger Piddles Wood to the south (across the A357) and bordered by the River Stour to the north.

It is included with Piddles Wood as an area designated a Site of Special Scientific Interest. Access is across fields from the car park for Fiddleford Manor.

== Description ==
Much of the woodland is oak, with hazel coppice; other deciduous trees include aspen and wild service tree. The wood slopes down to a strip of flood meadow by the River Stour, where in summer there are dragonflies and damselflies among the sedges, burdocks and teasels.

Flowers in the wood include bluebell, wood anemone, dog violet, greater stitchwort and moschatel. There is a system of rotational coppicing, which creates open areas, encouraging a diversity of wild flowers. Butterflies such as silver-washed fritillary, white admiral and purple hairstreak may be seen in the open areas.

Birds to be seen in the wood include residents such as woodpecker, marsh tit, nuthatch and treecreeper, and spring migrants willow warbler and spotted flycatcher.
