= Beacon Hill, Dorset =

Hill in Dorset, England

Beacon Hill
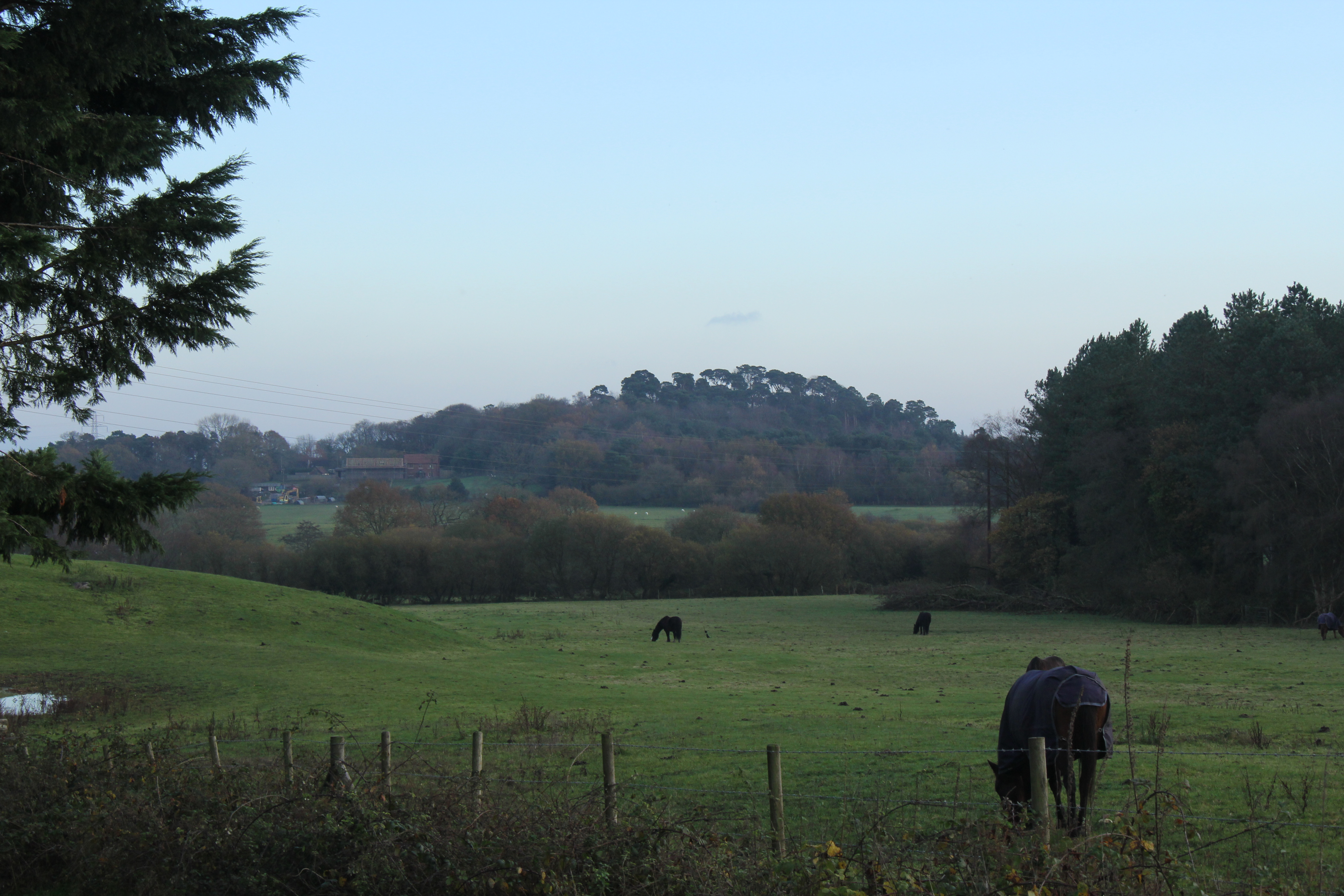
- Beacon Hill from the public footpath on Stoney Down to the NNW

Highest point
- Elevation: 84 m (276 ft)
- Coordinates: 50.752°N 2.039°W

Geography
- Location: Dorset, England
- OS grid: SY975947
- Topo map: OS Explorer OL15E

Beacon Hill is one of the highest viewpoints in the hinterland of Poole Harbour, Dorset. Its tree-covered summit reaches 84 metres (276 ft) above sea level and there is a public footpath running roughly north to south over the top. Historically it was one of a series of beacons used to warn of the advancing Spanish Armada. The earlier name for the hill was Lytchett Beacon.

== Geography ==
The hill is the highest point of Lytchett Heath which is part of the Dorset Heaths within the Poole Basin. To the northeast are old clay pits, now a landfill site operated by SITA UK. Beyond it, the land rises again to the summit of Upton Heath (92 metres (302 ft)), about 1 km away, where there is a trig point and nearby public car park. To the north-northwest, beyond the farmland, is the low, forested ridge of Stoney Down lying between the villages of Lytchett Matravers and Corfe Mullen

== History ==
The hill has had a key role in the defence of Dorset since at least the 14th century. It was formerly known as Lechiot Beacon and Lychett Beacon after the village of Lytchett Minster to the southwest. As the name suggests, it was the site of a beacon that would be lit in case of attack. In 1588, the beacon was lit to give warning of the approach of the Spanish Armada. During the Napoleonic Wars the beacon on Lytchett Heath was again manned in case of an attack by the French.

There were three old thatched cottages with cob walls on Lytchett Beacon which have survived to the present day and a track leads from them to the site of the old beacon. Today the track is a public footpath.

The old clay pits northeast of Beacon Hill were used to extract white china clay for export. They are now being used as a landfill site. The Dorset Museum has exhibits from these pits.

== Present day ==
On the hill itself is Beacon Hill Farm as well as a caravan and camping site, the Beacon Hill Touring Park. The Dorset Wildlife Trust Urban Wildlife Centre is in Beacon Hill Lane on the northern side of the hill.

== Literature ==
- Judd, Stanley and Kim Parker, An Account of the Role of Lytchett Beacon in Dorset’s Defences.
