= Castle Court =

Castle Court may refer to:

- CastleCourt, Belfast, Northern Ireland, a shopping centre
- Castle Court School, Dorset, England
