= St Andrew's Church, Okeford Fitzpaine =

Church of St Andrew
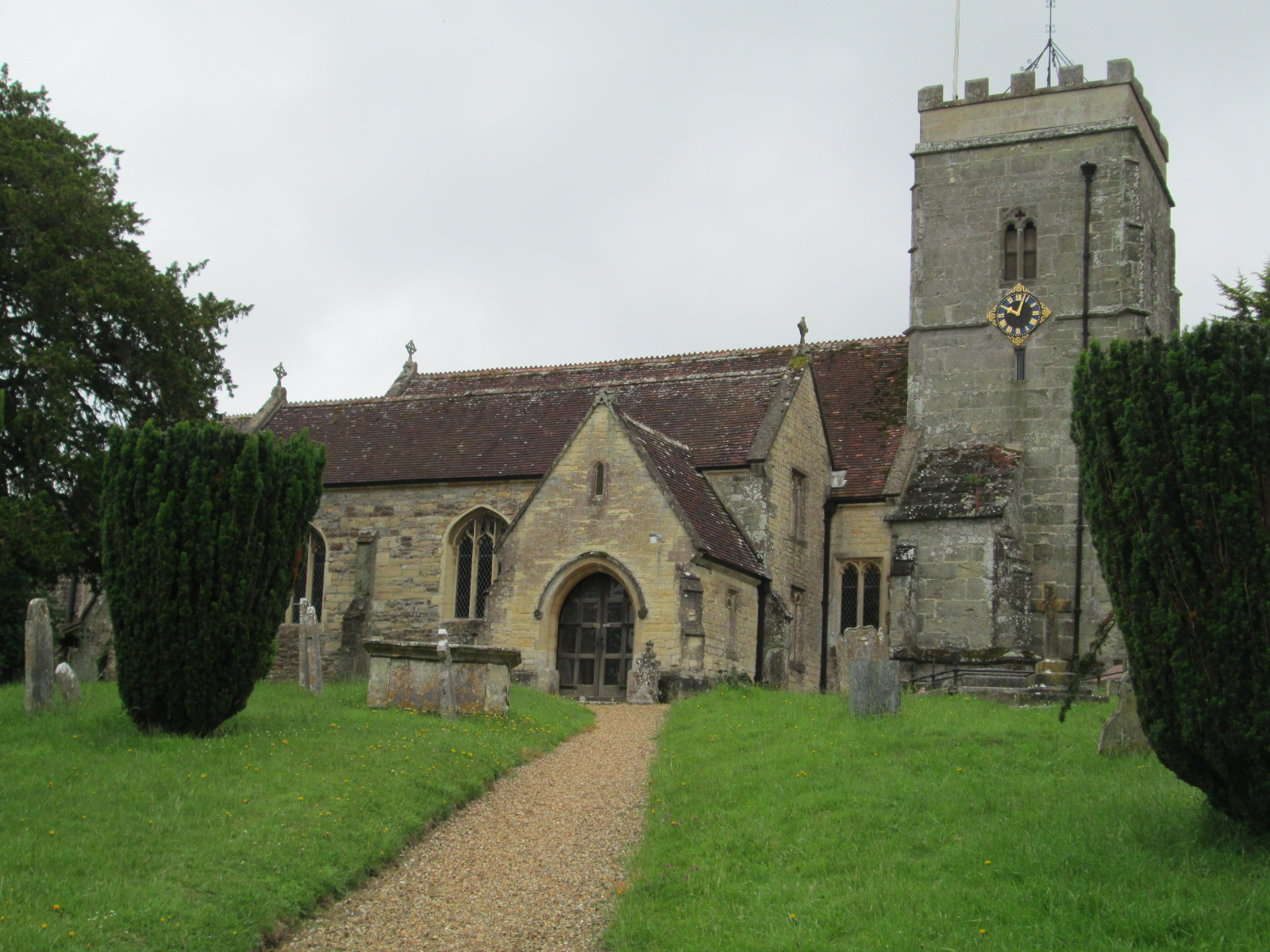
- View from the north-west
- Church of St Andrew
- 50°53′47.4″N 2°16′31.26″W
- OS grid reference: ST 80732 10816
- Location: Okeford Fitzpaine, Dorset
- Country: England
- Denomination: Church of England
- Website: okefordbenefice.org/parishes/okeford-fitzpaine

Architecture
- Heritage designation: Grade II*
- Designated: 4 September 1960

Administration
- Diocese: Diocese of Salisbury

St Andrew's Church is an Anglican church in the village of Okeford Fitzpaine, Dorset, and in the Diocese of Salisbury. It is in the Okeford Benefice, a group of four parishes in the Blackmore Vale. The church, with 14th-century origins and mostly rebuilt in the 19th century, is a Grade II* listed building.

== History and description ==
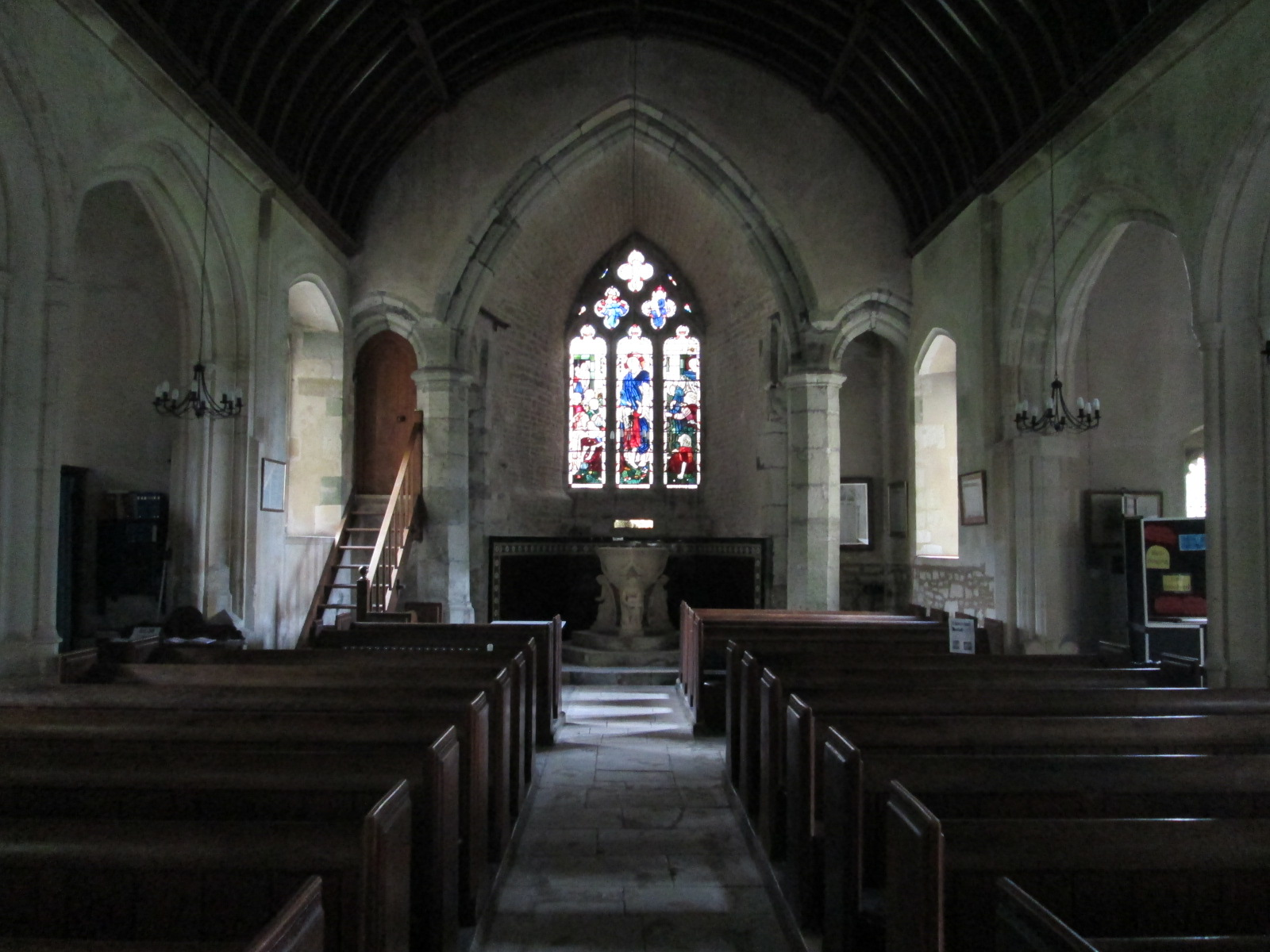
The interior in 2019, looking towards the tower arch, west window and font

The earliest mention of the church, during the time when Robert FitzPayne was lord of the manor, is from Simon of Gaunt, Bishop of Salisbury 1297–1317, who ordered the rector of this and neighbouring parishes to have their churches ready for consecration during the week following St James Day 1302.

The church is built of Greensand and Marnhull limestone. There is a west tower, a nave, north and south aisles, and chancel with north vestry adjoining. The tower, and parts of the nave and aisles, survive from the 15th-century church.

The lower part of the tower arch, including the two octagonal columns, and recessed west window date from the 14th century; this unusual feature is incorporated in the 15th-century tower.

The stone pulpit is of the 15th century. It was converted into a font in 1772 by the then incumbent, Rev. Duke Butler, and a carved oak pulpit was installed in its place. The chancel was also rebuilt in his time.

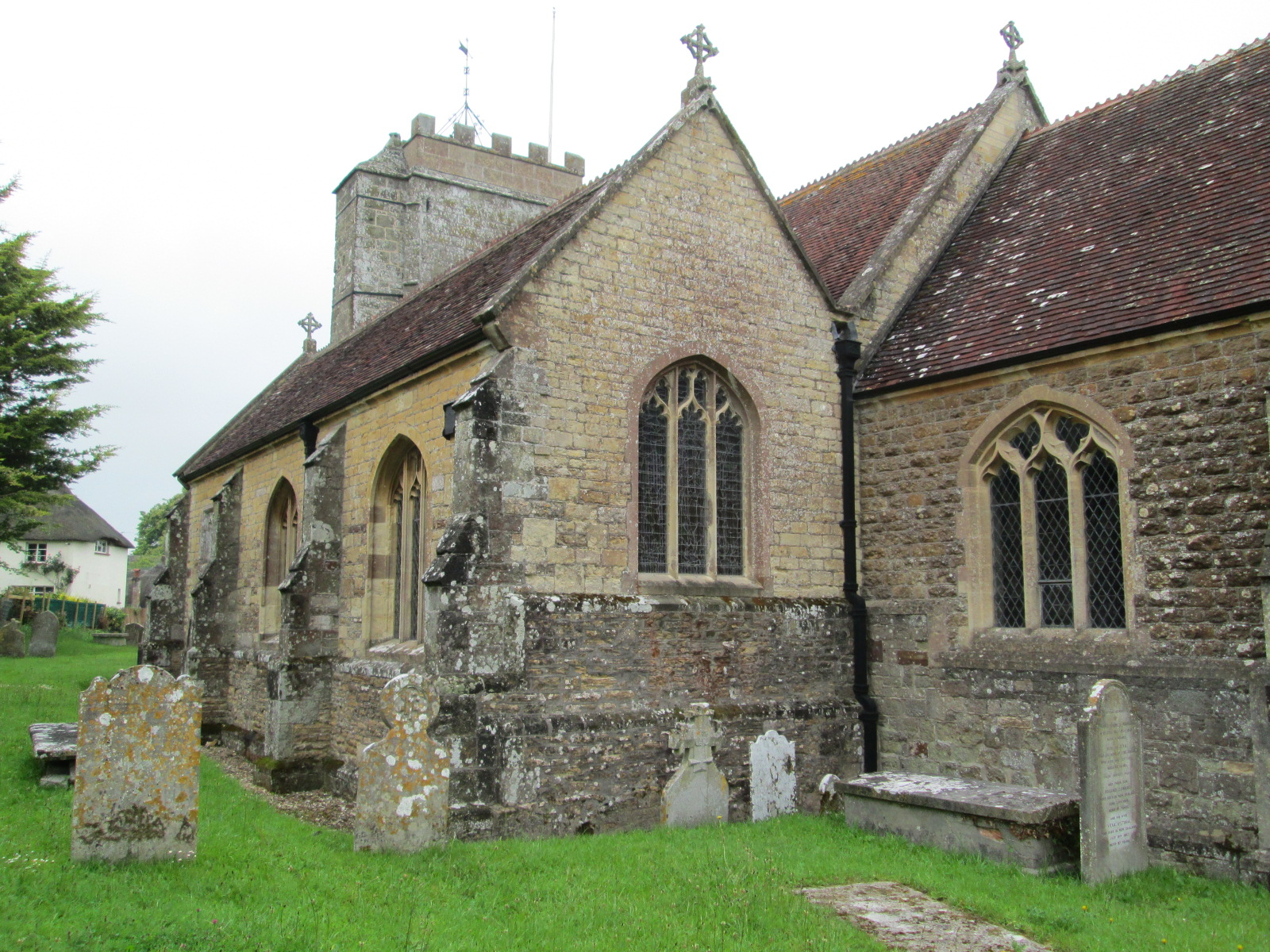
The south aisle and churchyard

There was rebuilding in 1865 of the chancel, north vestry and chancel arch. The musicians' gallery under the tower was removed. The north aisle was extensively restored, re-using old material. The lower part of the north wall is of the 15th century, and the 15th-century windows here were much restored. The south aisle is probably on the original foundations, and original material was re-used. The north porch has a gabled roof and moulded arch bearing the date 1866; the 15th-century north doorway was restored.

The stone pulpit was returned to its original use in 1865, and much restored, with figures added in the niches. The font of Purbeck marble, dating from this time, shows the font supported on carved angels.

Since 2019 the church has been re-ordered with the removal of the nave pews.
