= Banbury Hill =

Iron Age hillfort in Dorset, England

Banbury Hillfort
- Location within Dorset
- 50°54′23″N 2°18′01″W
- Type: Hillfort
- Periods: Iron Age
- Location: Near Sturminster Newton, Dorset
- OS grid reference: ST 790 119

Site notes
- Area: 1.2 hectares (3.0 acres)

Scheduled monument
- Designated: 14 July 1933
- Reference no.: 1018873

Banbury Hillfort, or Banbury Hill Camp, is an Iron Age hillfort, about 1.25 miles (2.0 km) south of Sturminster Newton and 1 mile (1.6 km) north-west of the village of Okeford Fitzpaine in Dorset, England.

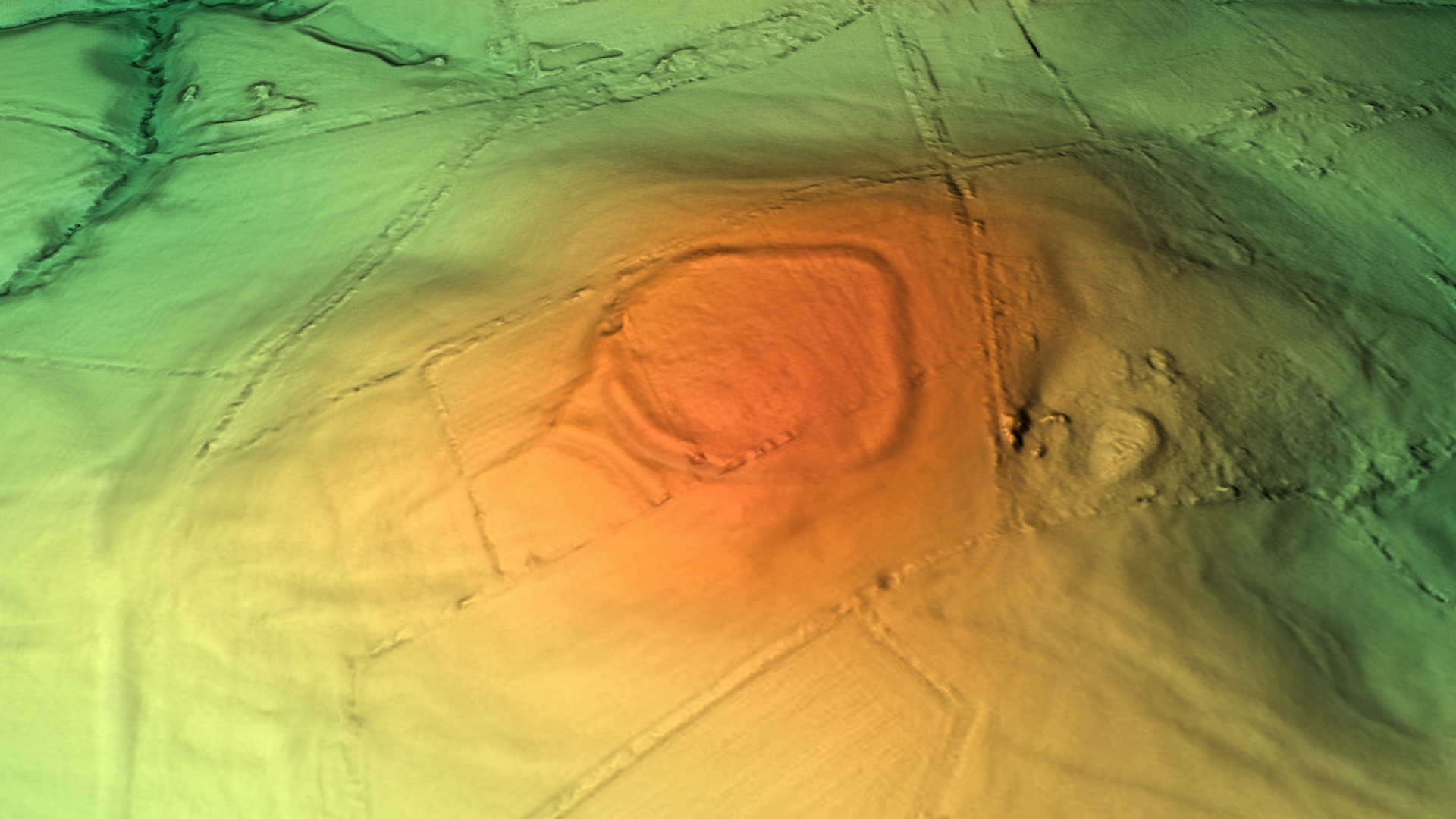
3D view of the digital terrain model

It is a scheduled monument.

== Description ==
The fort is on a low hill: a single bank encloses a roughly circular area of about 1.2 hectares (3.0 acres). The site has been affected in the past by ploughing. Where best preserved, the rampart is 15 metres (49 ft) wide and 0.5 metres (1.6 ft) above the interior, with an external ditch, visible in places, of width 8 metres (26 ft) and depth 1.5 metres (4.9 ft).

There is an original entrance on the west side, protected by an external bank 15 metres (49 ft) wide and 1 metre (3.3 ft) high, with traces of an external ditch. This bank, branching out from the north west part of the rampart, runs south-west and then curves towards the fort, so that there is a passage into the fort from the south, at one point down to about 2 metres (6.6 ft) wide.

There are no traces of remains in the interior.

The rampart (ascertained as a result of excavation in 1986 of a trench for a water pipe) has been found to be of local limestone, with some fragments of flint and chert.

== See also ==
- Hillforts in Britain
