= Fiddleford =

Village in Dorset, United Kingdom

Coordinates: 50.9124°N 2.2828°W

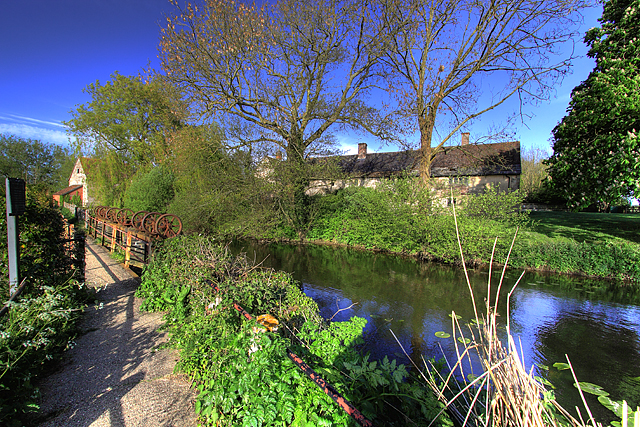
Fiddleford, the Mill and Manor House

Fiddleford is a hamlet in the county of Dorset in southern England. Fiddleford is situated between Sturminster Newton and Okeford Fitzpaine in the north of the county. It was founded by an English nobleman named Fitela (Fitela's Ford), and the aforementioned ford is over the River Stour.

The origin of the place-name is from Old English Fitela and ford meaning (homestead or farm) of a man called Fitela; the place-name appears as Fitelford in 1244.

Fiddleford has approximately 25 houses, a manor house by the river (Fiddleford Manor), a public house (the Fiddleford Inn), and a large mushroom farm.

Southwest of Fiddleford is Piddles Wood.

Every second month residents of Fiddleford produce the 'Fiddleford Flyer', a local magazine.
