= Sturminster Newton Castle =

- Location within Dorset
- 50°55′14″N 2°18′31″W
- Location: Sturminster Newton, Dorset
- OS grid reference: ST 784 135

Scheduled monument
- Designated: 30 April 1935
- Reference no.: 1002719

Listed Building – Grade II*
- Designated: 4 October 1960
- Reference no.: 1324461

Sturminster Newton Castle is a site consisting of the remains of a medieval manor house within an Iron Age hillfort, near Sturminster Newton in Dorset, England. The ruins are privately owned.

== Description ==
The manor house is thought to date from the 14th century. The southern end of the building survives as a two-storey ruin with no roof; it is probably the service range of the house, with a room above that is perhaps a solar. It is built of rubble with ashlar dressings. Architectural details can be seen, such as a fireplace in the supposed solar, and arched doorways. South-west of the ruin there is level ground, perhaps the site of the garden of the manor house.

The medieval ruins are within the earthwork remains of an Iron Age promontory fort. The fort, area about 1 hectare (2.5 acres), is on a steep-sided triangular spur of corallian limestone next to the River Stour to the north, and with a deep combe to the east and south. There is a curved rampart, up to 3 metres (9.8 ft) high and 12 metres (39 ft) wide, with an outer bank up to 6 metres (20 ft) deep and 18 metres (59 ft) wide. It separates the triangular spur from land to the west.

== History ==
The manor house is that of the manor of Newton; it was given to Glastonbury Abbey by King Edmund Ironside in 1016. The manor of Sturminster, north of the river, had been given to the Abbey by King Edgar the Peaceful in 968. The manor house was rebuilt in the 14th century, as recorded by the Abbot of Glastonbury, Walter de Monyton (1342–1375). The manor was retained by the Abbey until the Dissolution of the Monasteries in 1539.

By 1562, only the manor house and surrounding lands formed the Newton Estate. In subsequent documents it was referred to as an "impropriate rectory" or "impropriate parsonage", being an ecclesiastical property owned by a layman. The manor house was occupied until 1834, but was a ruin by the late 19th century.
