= St Mary's Church, Sturminster Newton =

Church in Dorset, England

St Mary's Church
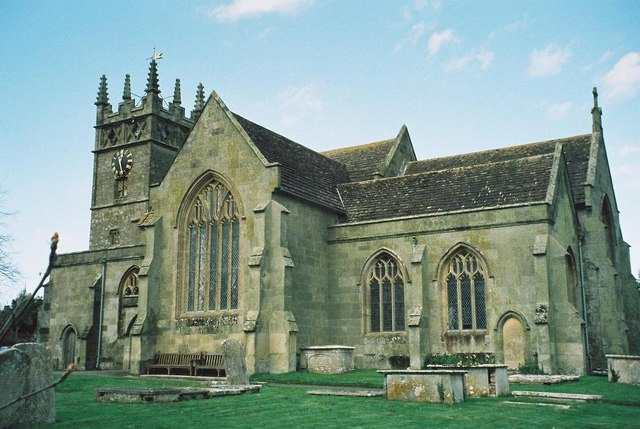
- St Mary's Church
- 50.9244°N 2.3030°W
- Location: Sturminster Newton
- Country: England
- Denomination: Church of England
- Website: stmaryssturminsternewton.org.uk

History
- Status: Active
- Dedication: St Mary

Architecture
- Functional status: Parish church
- Heritage designation: Grade I listed
- Designated: 04 October 1960

Administration
- Diocese: Salisbury

St Mary's Church is a Church of England Parish Church in Sturminster Newton, Dorset. The present church dates from a rebuild in 1486 by the abbots of Glastonbury. The church was heavily modified in the 19th century, but the carved wagon roof remains.

The church is designated as Grade I by Historic England.

The church is notable for having stained glass windows by Mary Lowndes and Harry Clarke.
