= Shaftesbury School =

Coordinates: 51°0′7″N 2°11′19″W

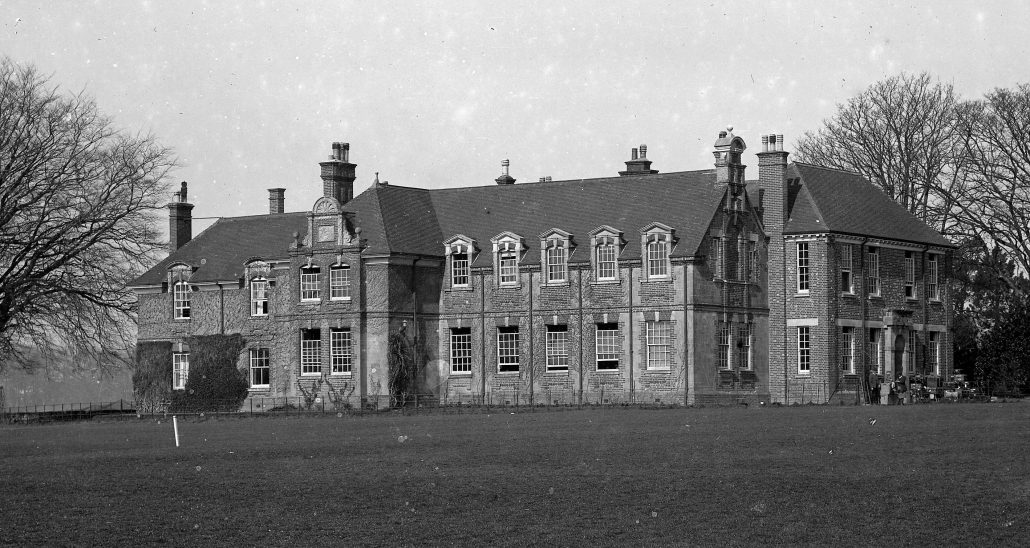
- in 1915 (Shaftesbury Boys Grammar School was built in 1878)

Location
- Salisbury Road; Shaftesbury, Dorset, SP7 8ER; England

Information
- Type: Academy
- Motto: Aspiration, Action, Achievement
- Religious affiliation: Church of England
- Established: 1718; 308 years ago
- Department for Education URN: 140898 Tables
- Ofsted: Reports
- Headteacher: Donna London-Hill
- Gender: Coeducational
- Age: 11 to 18
- Enrolment: 960 as of February 2021
- Capacity: 1283
- Houses: Duncliffe, Gold, Hambledon, Melbury
- Colours: Green; Blue; Red; Yellow
- Website: www.shaftesburyschool.co.uk

Shaftesbury School is a coeducational secondary day school located in Shaftesbury in the English county of Dorset. It is a descendant of the former Shaftesbury High School for Girls and Shaftesbury Grammar School. Previously a voluntary controlled Church of England school administered by the Diocese of Salisbury and Dorset County Council, the school converted to academy status under the Diocese of Salisbury in June 2014.

== History ==
The origins of the school date back to 1718 when the original Blue Coat School was founded in Shaftesbury, and the school offered boarding from 1898 until 2023. Before its closure, it was one of only thirty-nine state boarding schools in England. The Blue Coat School became the boys' grammar school in 1872.

In the July of 2025, teachers at the school went on strike over restructuring plans due to financial mismanagement from their parent academy trust SAST, and the sacking of a senior member of staff.

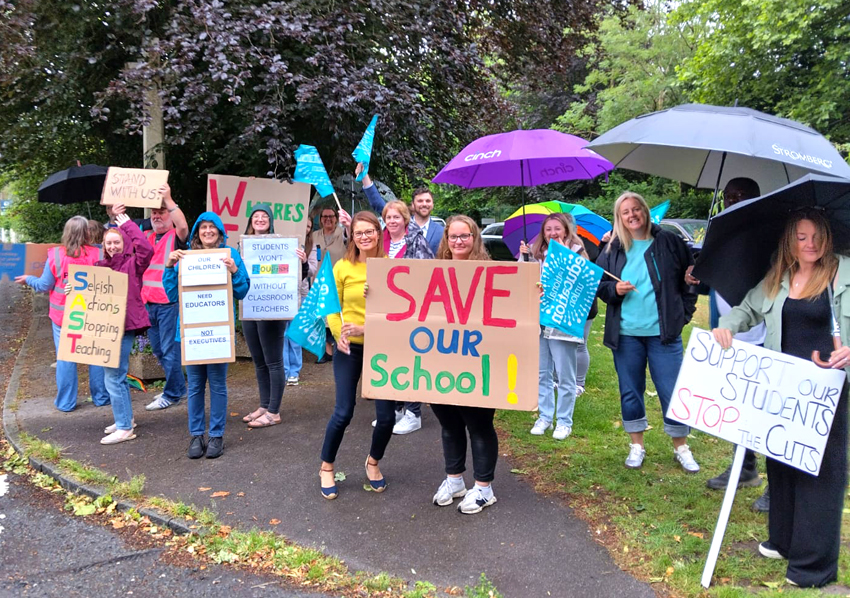
Teachers from Shaftesbury School in the picket line during industrial action in 2025

== Curriculum ==
Shaftesbury School offers GCSEs, and BTECs as programmes of study for pupils. Shaftesbury School's sixth form provision has links to Sturminster Newton High School in Sturminster Newton, and students in the sixth form have the option to study from a range of A Levels and further BTECs on two sites.

== Alumni ==
Annie Stainer (1965-2025) became a performance artist who created work in several countries.

== See also ==
- List of English and Welsh endowed schools (19th century)
