= Stoney Down =

Hill in Dorset, England

Coordinates: 50.767°N 2.046°W

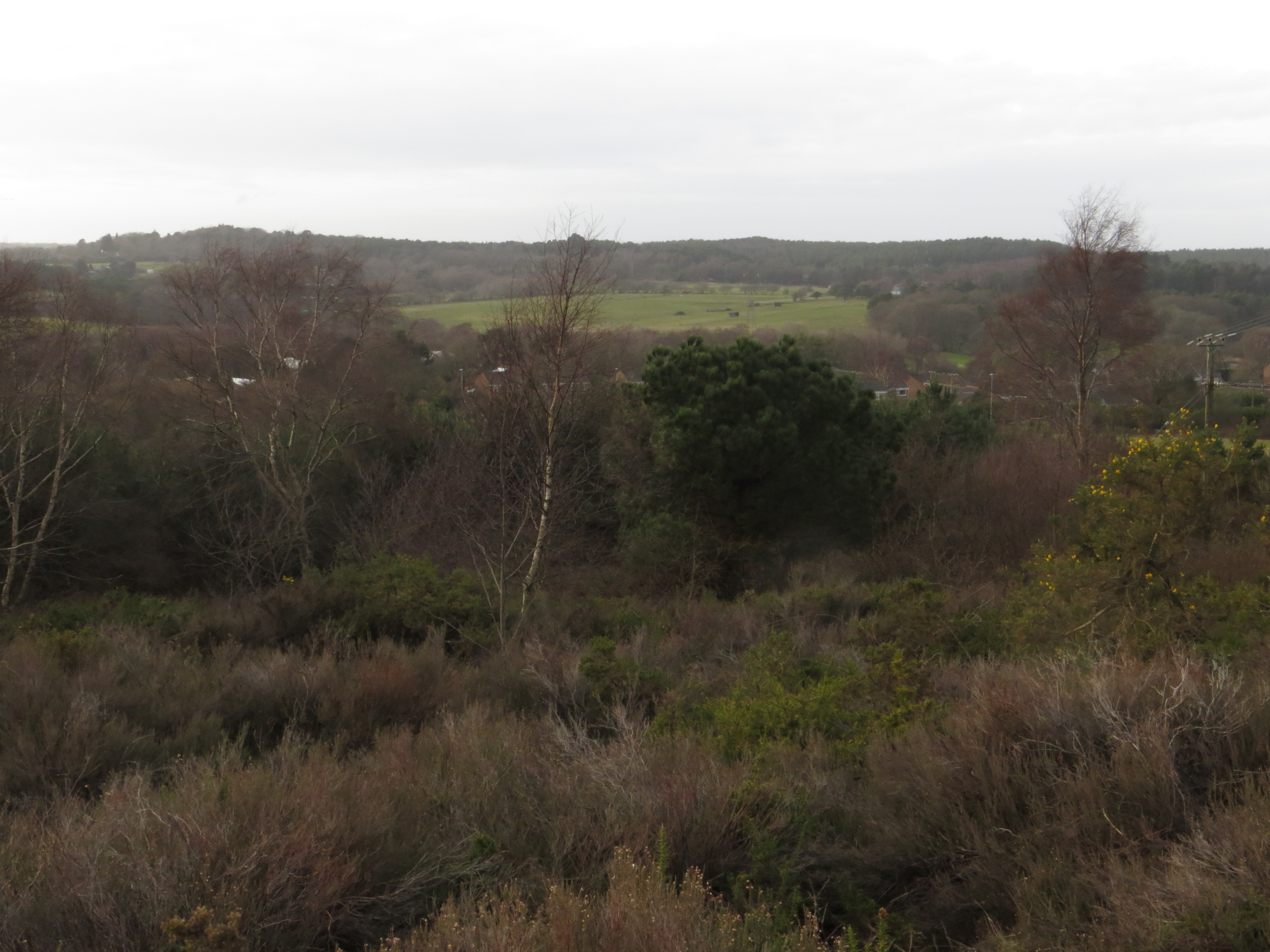
The wooded ridgeline of Stoney Down seen from Upton Heath

Stoney Down or Stony Down is both a hill and an area of forested countryside in the county of Dorset, England, that has been designated an "Area of Great Landscape Value" (AGLV) in the East Dorset Local Plan. The forest is known as the Stoney Down Plantation or Stony Down Plantation. It covers an area of 51.13 hectares (126.3 acres). The area is popular with riders and walkers.

== Geography ==
=== Location ===
Stoney Down is part of the Corfe Mullen AGLV, which covers an area of just under 3 square miles. The plantation lies 2 kilometres (1.2 mi) west of Corfe Mullen's village centre and 2.5 kilometres (1.6 mi) east-northeast of Lytchett Matravers. To the north, across Crumpet's Valley, is the Henbury Plantation with its sand and gravel pits that reaches a high point in Notting Hill (89 m). To the northeast are the grounds of Castle Court School around Knoll Clump. To the east is Corfe Mullen, to the southeast are Poor Common and Beacon Hill. Away to the south and southwest across Elder Moor are the Purbeck Hills.

=== Topography ===
Its highest elevation is the hill of Stoney Down which is 83 metres (272 ft) high. The main high points on the Stoney Down ridge are (from southwest to northeast) Barrow Hill (75 m), Forest Hill (82 m), Stoney Down (83 m) and Allen Hill (80 m). The Stoney Down Plantation covers much of the area, extending from Rushall Lane to Brickyard Lane.

=== Character ===
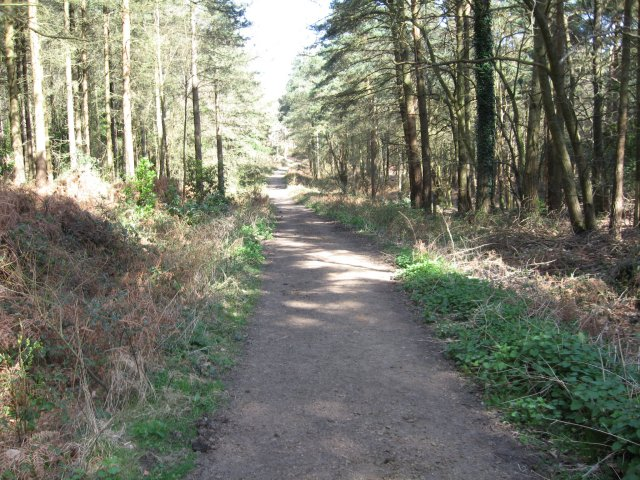
Stoney Down Plantation

Much of the woodland is mixed, but there are also significant stands of pine, Douglas fir and larch. Within the wood are scattered examples of huge, ancient oak as well as copses of sweet chestnut. The courses of two power lines across the plantation form major firebreaks of open, irregular, sandy terrain.

== Development ==
In July 2015, the plantation was purchased by Paradise Farms which is proposing to establish a holiday park with nine yurts on the site. It has also applied to stop public use of the plantation for leisure pursuits, although acknowledging the public bridleway will have to be kept open. The proposals have met with opposition from local residents.
