= Piddles Wood =

Woodland in Dorset, England

- Puttekwurth; Putteleswurthe; Hanging Ground
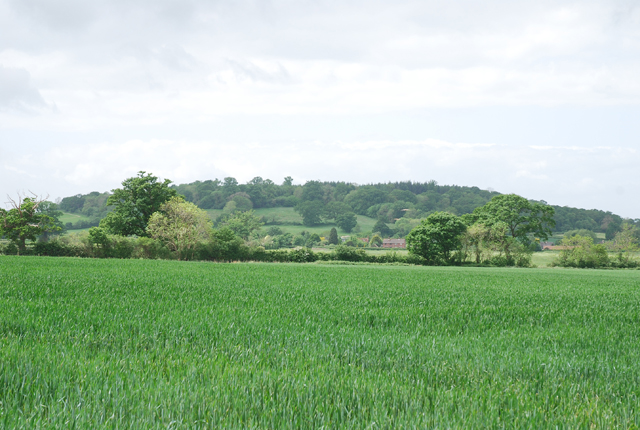
- A view towards Fiddleford and Piddles Wood
- Interactive map of Piddles Wood
- Type: Woodland
- Location: Dorset, England
- Nearest town: Sturminster Newton
- Coordinates: 50.915695°N 2.291861°W
- Area: 62.2 hectares (154 acres)
- Status: SSSI

Piddles Wood is a small area of woodland south of the River Stour, Dorset, and a Site of Special Scientific Interest (SSSI). The site was notified as an SSSI in 1985. The nearest settlement is the town of Sturminster Newton. The local planning authority is Dorset Council, but part of the site is managed by the Dorset Naturalists' Trust.

Piddles Wood was first documented in the 13th century as Puttekwurth and Putteleswurthe. A "wurth" is an enclosure, and "Pyttel" was an Old English surname, so the name could mean "Pyttel's enclosure". However, another etymology is possible as "puttoc" is an Old English word for a kite, with "pyttel" or "piddle" also being used. It is also known as "Hanging Ground".

The area of the site is 62.2 hectares (154 acres). Woodlands in North Dorset are scarce, and Piddles Wood is one of only a handful of such sites. Due to the heavy neutral and lighter acid soil types—caused by the underlying Kimmeridge Clay and Plateau Gravels—the site has a varying woodland flora, containing broadleaved, mixed and yew lowland. However, it is dominated by oak and coppiced hazel—for which reason the site was listed as an SSSI—and its flora and fauna is typical of oak woodland in Dorset. Piddles Wood has an abundance of ground flora, including woodruff (Galium odoratum), sanicle (Sanicula europaea), early purple orchid (Orchis mascula), wood spurge (Euphorbia amygdaloides) and orpine (Sedum telephium). The site is also very rich for insect fauna, and among the butterflies found on the site are the white admiral (Limenitis camilla), wood white (Leptidea sinapis) and silver-washed fritillary (Argynnis paphia); it was previously home to the pearl-bordered fritillary (Boloria euphrosyne), although this is now believed to be extinct in Dorset. Adjacent to the edge of the site is an extensive poultry farm, containing approximately 100,000 birds.

== See also ==
- List of SSSIs in Dorset
