= Corfe Mullen (ward) =

Electoral ward in Dorset, England

- ward Dorset Council
- Local government in England: Dorset
- Population: 10,248
- Electorate: 8,020
- Major settlements: Corfe Mullen

Current ward
- Created: 2019
- Councillor: Duncan Sowry-House (Liberal Democrats)
- Councillor: Scott Florek (Liberal Democrats)
- Number of councillors: 2

Corfe Mullen is an electoral ward in Dorset. Since 2019, the ward has elected two councillors to Dorset Council.

== Geography ==
The Corfe Mullen ward is based on the village of Corfe Mullen.

== Councillors ==
Election	Councillors	
2019	Paul Ronald Harrison (Conservative)	Mike Barron (Liberal Democrats) (joined Conservatives in 2021).
2024	Duncan Sowry-House (Liberal Democrats)	Scott Florek (Liberal Democrats)

== Elections ==
=== 2019 Dorset Council election ===
2019 Dorset Council election: Corfe Mullen (2 seats)
Party	Candidate	Votes	%	±%
Liberal Democrats	Mike Barron	1,388	47.7	
Conservative	Paul Ronald Harrison	1,292	44.4	
Liberal Democrats	Duncan Anthony Sowry-House	1,138	39.1	
Conservative	Sarah Jayne Burns	1,093	37.6	
Green	Tracie Stevens	374	12.9	
Labour	David Peden	222	7.6	
Majority				
Turnout		2,909	37.07	
Liberal Democrats win (new seat)				
Conservative win (new seat)				

=== 2024 Dorset Council election ===
2024 Dorset Council election: Corfe Mullen (2 seats)
Party	Candidate	Votes	%	±%
Liberal Democrats	Duncan Sowry-House	1,249	53.7	+14.6
Liberal Democrats	Scott Florek	1,145	49.3	+1.6
Conservative	Mike Barron*	641	27.6	−20.1
Conservative	Penny Barron	597	25.7	−18.7
Independent	Lee Charles Hardy	457	19.7	New
Labour	Graham Paul Hillman	197	8.5	+0.9
Turnout		2,324	29.03	
Liberal Democrats hold		Swing		
Liberal Democrats gain from Conservative		Swing		

== See also ==
- List of electoral wards in Dorset
