= Atlantic Academy Portland =

Location
- Maritime House, Southwell Park; Isle of Portland, Dorset, DT5 2NA; England; 50°31′45″N 2°27′05″W

Information
- Type: Academy
- Motto: ‘100% Every day. No Shortcuts’ ‘Excellence is a habit’
- Trust: Aspirations Academies Trust UID:2187
- Department for Education URN: 145119 Tables
- Ofsted: Reports
- Gender: Coeducational
- Age: 4 to 16
- Enrolment: 811 as of November 2018
- Capacity: ≈1020
- Website: www.atlantic-aspirations.org

Atlantic Academy Portland, formerly known as the Isle of Portland Aldridge Community Academy, is a coeducational all-through school for children aged 4 to 16. The school is located on one site on the Isle of Portland in the English county of Dorset.

== History ==
The Isle of Portland Aldridge Community Academy was formed in September 2012 from the merger of Brackenbury Infant School, Grove Infant School, Southwell County Primary School, Underhill Community Junior School and Royal Manor Arts College. As an academy, the school was originally sponsored by The Aldridge Foundation and Dorset County Council.

A new campus, Osprey Quay Campus, opened in 2014. It was followed by the opening of the main campus site, Maritime House, in September 2016. In September 2016, Aldridge Education multi-academy trust took over the responsibility for all Aldridge Schools from the Aldridge Foundation. In October it was announced that the Academy would not be joining the multi-academy trust and that Aldridge were standing down as sponsor. Dorset County Council remains a sponsor.

In November 2016, the school was inspected by Ofsted and declared inadequate. IPACA became Atlantic Academy Portland in September 2017, managed by Aspirations Academies Trust.

== Academics ==
Aspirations Academies Trust is a multi-academy trust supporting 16 academies in Dorset, Banbury and Feltham in West London. The school they inherited was 'inadequate'; they aimed to create an academy where the students believed in themselves and were actively engaged in their own learning and saw a connection between the learning tasks and their ambitions for the future. They needed to create a challenging curriculum and disruption free learning. It is an ‘all through’ Academy, with all years housed within the same school building.

An early change was to reduce the schools capacity, the PAN or school number in jargon, from 1580 to 1220, to have year groups of 60 in Primary and 120 in Secondary, where previously it was 60 and 150. This reduces overcrowding while allowing all pupils to be on a single site.

=== Curriculum ===
As an all-through school, with students from reception class to upper sixth- there needs to be a unified teaching approach in all key stages, from Key Stage R to Key Stage 5. The Aspirations Academies Trust is developing a common curricular approach the will be used in each of its academies, albeit reflecting the local community and the particular needs of its students, It will contain :

- The Early Years curriculum requirements,
- The National Curriculum in Key Stages 1, 2, 3 and 4.
- ‘No Limits: Education for success in the 21st century’ -a trust wide KS2 and KS3 teaching scheme
- The EBacc academic programme at KS4
- The trust CEIL programme at Post 16

=== Current subjects ===
Learning in Key Stage Two is linked to a central topic, such as an Energy and Sustainability or ‘The Middle East’. The topic mapping has been specially designed to support the needs of the pupils.

At Key Stage 3, year 8 and 9 students study English, Maths, Science, French, Music, Art, Drama, RE, Geography, History, Design Technology; Computer Science and Business Enterprise and PE. In Year 7 the students study the new No Limits Curriculum: which will include English, Maths, Science, French, Music, Art, Drama, Geography, History, Design Technology and PE.

At Key Stage 4 students study a mixture of GCSEs and BTECs. All pupils study English, English Literature, Maths, and Science. They are allowed four options, two of which must be EBacc subjects, and two chosen from Art, business Studies, Drama, Music, Food, Product Design and Philosophy. The Ebacc subjects are History, Geography, French and Computer Science.
