= Fiddleford Manor =

Medieval manor house in Dorset, England

Coordinates: 50.9213°N 2.2845°W

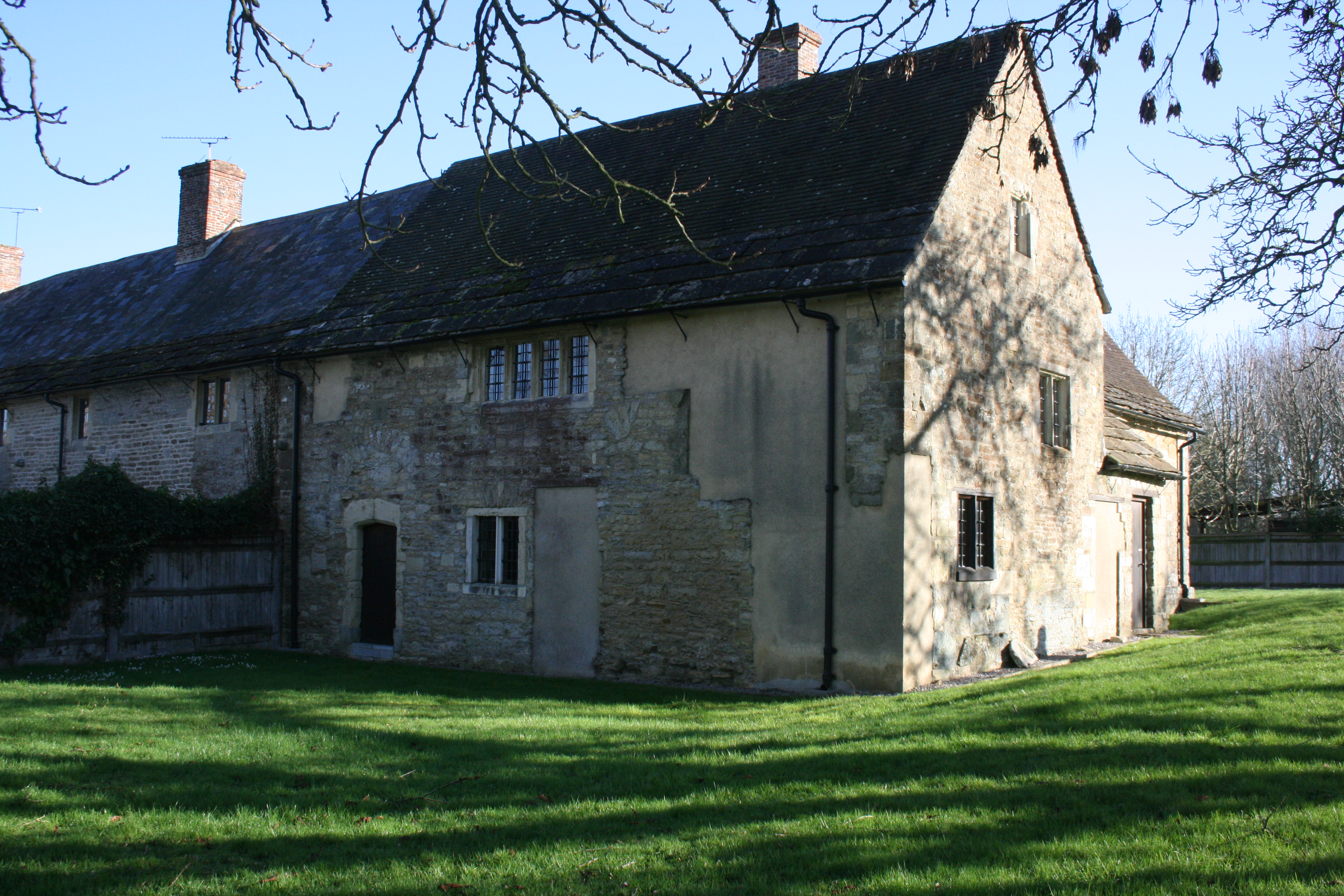
Fiddleford Manor.

Fiddleford Manor (also known as Fiddleford Mill) is a medieval manor house located near Sturminster Newton, Dorset. It is thought to have been originally built around 1370 for William Latimer, the sheriff of Somerset and Dorset, after the manor passed to him in 1355. The house is now owned by English Heritage and open for the public to visit throughout the year; however, there is an adjoining building to the north that continues to serve as a private residence and is not open to the public.

The present day site—set in a T-shape—comprises a two-storey solar and half of the hall to the east of that, both with open timber roofs; the foundations of the west range and an extension of the hall are now visible only as earthworks. The house is unusual among its class of building in retaining many of its original features; this despite having undergone many alterations during its 600-year history. It has been described as having "perhaps the most spectacular manor house interior in Dorset." In the sixteenth century the solar wing was extended to the north and the hall remodeled by architect Thomas White and his wife Anne; the house remained in the White family until at least the time of Charles I. After the Restoration, it was bought by Sir Thomas Freke and retained by his descendants, the Pitt-Rivers family; they reduced the length of the hall by 2 metres (6.6 ft), it having previously extended almost to the River Stour, and added a new fireplace and ceiling. By 1956, however, the 18th-century building had been demolished and the original, 14th-century part was derelict; by 1962, only the northern wing remained habitable, and the original section passed into state ownership. The house underwent restoration during the 1970s by the Department for the Environment—now the Department for Environment, Food and Rural Affairs (DEFRA).
