= Sturminster Newton High School =

Location
- Bath Road; Sturminster Newton, Dorset, DT10 1DT; England
- 50.93412°N 2.30364°W

Information
- Type: Academy
- Local authority: Dorset
- Trust: Sherborne Area Schools' Trust
- Department for Education URN: 149657 Tables
- Ofsted: Reports
- Head Teacher: Michael Motterham
- Gender: Coeducational
- Age: 11 to 18
- Enrolment: 600 as of May 2023
- Capacity: 900
- Houses: Hardy; Barnes; Thornhill; Raleigh
- Colour: Blue
- Website: www.mysnhs.net

Sturminster Newton High School is a coeducational secondary school and sixth form located in Sturminster Newton in the English county of Dorset.

== History ==
The school was assessed as "good" overall, and "outstanding" in behaviour and safety of pupils, at its last full Ofsted inspection in June 2015. This was confirmed by a short inspection in 2018.

On March 16, 2016 a double-decker bus transporting students into school caught fire. It continued until it was in the school car park where all students were able to disembark safely.

A local tradesman working on a boiler in the school was suddenly killed on 19 July 2016. An investigation was launched and the exact cause of his death remains unknown.

In October 2016, Joseph Davidson, former head of geography at Sturminster Newton High School, was sentenced to 40 months in prison for three offences of sexual activity with a child under the age of 16. The victim was a student at the school.

Previously a community school administered by Dorset County Council, in June 2023 Sturminster Newton High School converted to academy status. The school is now sponsored by the Sherborne Area Schools' Trust.

== Admissions ==
Admissions to the school usually come from nearby primary schools, including Hazelbury Bryan School, Okeford Fitzpaine CE VA Primary School, Shillingstone CE VA Primary School, Stalbridge CE Primary School, St Nicholas CE VA Primary School, William Barnes Primary School and Yewstock School.

== Academics ==
Sturminster Newton High School offers GCSEs, BTECs and the CiDA as programmes of study for pupils. Sturminster Newton High School's sixth form provision is offered in conjunction with Shaftesbury School in Shaftesbury, and students in the sixth form have the option to study from a range of A-levels and further BTECs.
