= Corfe Mullen =

Village and civil parish in Dorset, England

- Village and civil parish
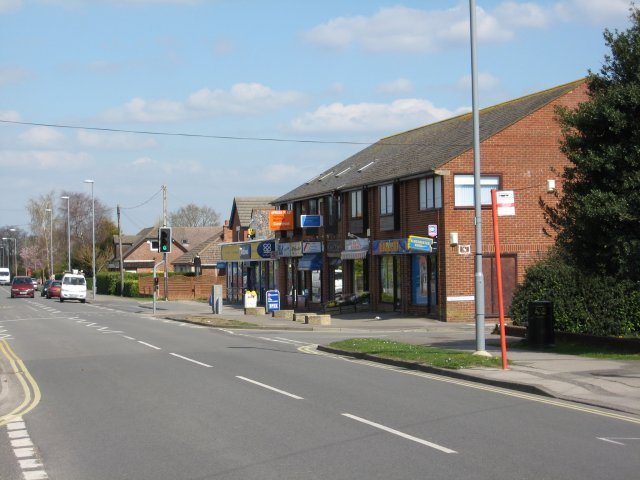
- Wareham Road, Corfe Mullen
- Interactive map showing Corfe Mullen parish boundary
- Sovereign state: United Kingdom
- Constituent country: England
- Region: South West England
- Ceremonial county: Dorset
- Historic county: Dorset
- Unitary authority: Dorset Council

Government
  - Type: Civil parish
  - Body: Corfe Mullen Town Council
  - MP: Vikki Slade (LD)

Area
  - Total: 12.28 km^{2} (4.74 sq mi)

Population (2021 census)
  - Total: 10,374
- Time zone: UTC+0 (Greenwich Mean Time)
- Postcode: BH21
- Post town: Wimborne
- Area code: 01202
- ISO 3166-2: GB-DOR (Dorset)
- ONS code: 19UD (ONS); E04003365 (GSS)
- OS grid reference: SY9891897148
- Website: Town Council

Corfe Mullen /ˌkɔːrf ˈmʌlən/ is a village and civil parish in Dorset, England, on the north-western urban fringe of the South East Dorset conurbation. The parish had a population of 10,374 at the 2021 census. It is served by six churches, four pubs, five schools, a library, various shops and local businesses, a village hall, and many community and sports organisations.

The name Corfe Mullen is derived from corf (the Old English for a cutting or pass) and molin (the Old French for a mill). The mill referred to is the old water mill on the River Stour, mentioned in the Domesday Book of 1086, where the village originally stood.

Despite the proximity of the urban area, Corfe Mullen is surrounded by the South West Hampshire/South East Dorset Green Belt. It lies within the Dorset Heaths.

== History ==
=== Early nomadic tribes and settlers ===
The first evidence of people living in the area consists mainly of a number of flint axeheads that have been found within the village and which date from the Palaeolithic and Mesolithic (Old and Middle Stone Ages). Around 3000 BC, the first real settlers came, cleared the forests and began to farm, although even they were largely nomadic. Later settlers, during the Bronze Age, built burial mounds or barrows, examples of which may be found to the east of the village at Barrow Hill and at Naked Cross at the southern end of the village. These forms of occupation continued into the Iron Age; evidence of pottery manufactured around the 1st century BC may be found at East End. Just prior to the coming of the Romans, in around 50 BC, the area was inhabited by the Belgae.

=== Romans ===
The Roman Second Legion under Vespasian arrived in the Corfe Mullen area during the fifth decade of the 1st century AD and built a 40-acre (16 ha) fortress just to the north of the village at Lake Farm, Ashington. The location of this fortress was important; the River Stour provided a defensive barrier to the north and the site is only 3 miles (4.8 km) from the Iron Age hillfort at Badbury Rings. Lake cut this important tribal centre off from the settlements at Dudsbury and Hengistbury Head.

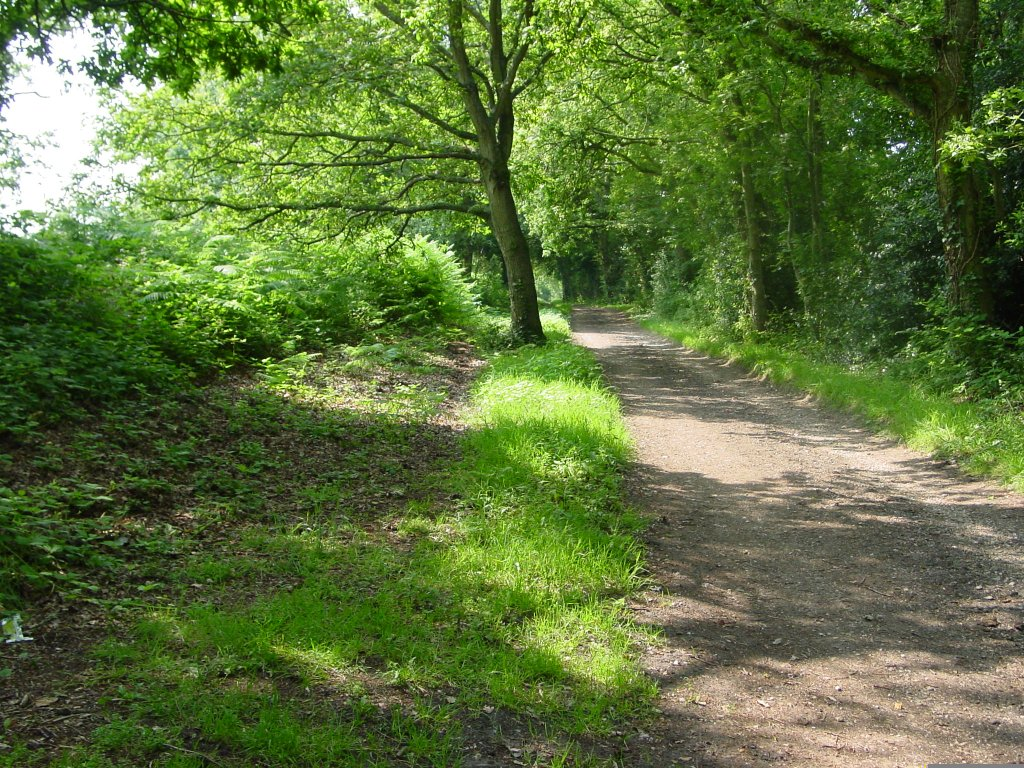
The Roman road (the overgrown bank on the left) east of the village

To subjugate the local tribes and keep themselves supplied and in communication with other Roman centres, the Legion built several roads that run through or close to the area. Probably the most important of these, and the only one visible today, is the road that connected the deep water anchorage at Morionio (now Hamworthy) and Lake (now Ashington), and continues northwards to Badbury and Hod Hill. This road forms the eastern boundary of the village. Traces of two other roads have also been found, both of which are underneath or follow the course of modern roads; one of these linked Lake with Dorchester, and is roughly aligned with the A31, the other ran through the spine of the village and followed the present road to Wareham.

Although the Roman occupation of Britain lasted nearly 400 years, the military presence at Corfe Mullen was very short lived, lasting only until the 1st century's seventh decade. However the Roman influence continued in agriculture and industry even after they had left and the Celtic-speaking people that descended from the original tribes took over the area again.

=== Saxons ===
The Saxons probably settled in the area around the 7th century. Christianity arrived before 700 AD and open-air services are believed to have been held on the same site as the present-day old village church. During the centuries leading up to the millennium, division of land into hundreds, and tithe took place and Manorial courts dealt with disputes. The name of Corf came into usage during this period and was located in the hundred of Cogdean, with the court being held at Cogdean Elms in the north of the present village.

A number of other land holdings dating from this period have been found around the village, the most notable being at Mountain Clump and the Knoll, where the remains of cottages may be seen.

=== Norman period and Middle Ages ===
After the Norman Conquest, Corf's entry in the Domesday Book shows that it appears to have been a single manor under 'Robert, son of Gerold', but was previously held by two Saxon lords: Waga and Egelric. At some time during the next two or three centuries, the village reverted to two manors: probably Corf Molin and Corf Hubert. The latter manor was almost certainly named after a former lord, Hubert de la Vielle. By 1469 the two manors were combined into one again, although the two names were still preserved at that time. It was probably another century before the present-day name came about. This merger was probably driven by the general depopulation of the country that occurred in the Middle Ages due to migration to the towns and the Black Death.

A third part of the village came to be known as Corfe Mullen St Nicholas. The origin of this appears to date back to a land acquisition by St Nicholas Hospital (a Salisbury charity) in 1279. The present-day areas of Lambs Green, East End and Brog Street were still called this until the early part of the 20th century.

Construction of the original parish church, then called St Nicholas but now St Hubert's, was commenced during the 13th century, with the tower being added a little later.

=== Elizabethan to Georgian period ===
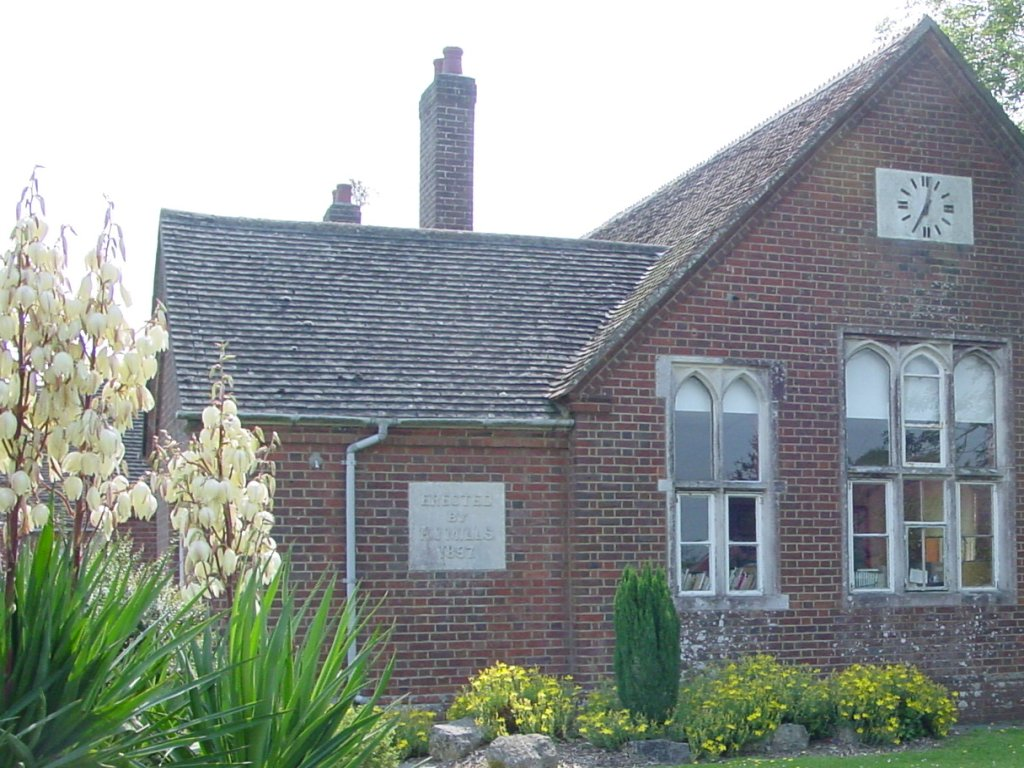
Lockyer's Middle School was Lockyer's Charity School (formed in 1706)

After the major changes seen after the Normans, a period of stability came to the village for about 300 years. From Elizabethan to Georgian times prosperity increased, with a number of wealthy families being the major landowners. None of these families built their homes within the parish boundaries, although the Phelipps family took over an Elizabethan manor house (the Court House) near the church and lived there for many years. Other architectural legacies of this period are some notable farm houses, a few cottages and the original building that housed Lockyer's Charity School, formed in 1706 by Richard Lockyer. This building is still used by the present-day Lockyer's Middle School.

During the latter half of the 18th century, a toll road was constructed by private enterprise; Higher Blandford Road and Mill Street were part of a new route between Poole and Blandford which resulted in the people of Corfe Mullen having access to the major markets of these two towns.

=== Victorian era ===
During the reign of Queen Victoria, more toll roads were constructed, including an extension to Mill Street which provided a new route from Bere Regis to Wimborne. The railways arrived by the late 19th century, with tracks first appearing within walking distance of the village at Wimborne and later with a route that went through the village, though it was well into the 20th century before Corfe Mullen Halt station was provided.

=== 20th century ===
In the 20th century development accelerated. Development between the wars occurred along Higher Blandford Road and Wareham Road, with the populated area gradually extending up the hill, away from the original riverside centre at Mill Street and the older cottages at Brog Street, Lambs Green and East End.

African American troops came to stay in Corfe Mullen in around 1942, taking over big houses such as Glendon and The Towers. These included soldiers from the 1317th Engineer General Services Regiment who came to build the Tarrant Rushton aerodrome for the use of Douglas C-47 Skytrain “Dakota” transport aircraft and gliders, in preparation for D-Day.

The village was known at the time as 'Little Harlem'.

In the 1950s and 1960s major new housing estates were built around Phelipps Road and Hilltop Road, and in the last forty years of the century, new housing was built on most of the area between Broadstone and the eastern boundary of the village.

During the early part of the century, the village became known for its violet and lavender cultivation, which was centred around Violet Farm and Lavender Lodge (previously Corfe Lodge). Following a decline in trade, Violet Farm was demolished in the 1960s – along with a 300-year-old tithe barn – to make way for new bungalows.

=== 21st century ===
During the first decade of the 21st century, proposals were made by the South West Regional Assembly to build 700 new homes on green belt land on the edge of the village. These plans were opposed by a majority of villagers. The developments were shelved and East Dorset District Council later published more modest plans to build on the sites of the middle school or recreation ground. The adoption of any of these sites would require relocation of the school or recreational facilities. A public consultation period ended in January 2011, and the results are awaited. The Regional Spatial Strategies were later revoked by the government, leaving the responsibility for the location of any additional dwellings in the area to be determined by Dorset County Council

In October 2022, local campaigners lost a six-year-long battle to register the Stony Down Plantation woodlands as a village green, after the landowners erected a fence restricting villagers' right to roam in 2015. Dorset Council rejected the application, after fewer than the expected 200 verified submissions were submitted.

In October 2023, Dorset Police launched a criminal investigation into the felling of a mature woodland , without applying for planning permission, by a developer which were suspected of being a habitat for bats, owls and woodpeckers. Dorset Police confirmed 24 hours later that they had closed the investigation following "insufficient evidence" that a wildlife crime had taken place and no further action was taken. Vikki Slade MP raised the issue in Parliament, calling for "bringing forward legislation to auto protect trees above a particular size or age in their planning reforms, so developers do not get away with environmental vandalism.”

== Government and politics ==
Corfe Mullen Village Hall in 2012

There are two tiers of local government covering Corfe Mullen, at civil parish and unitary authority level: Corfe Mullen Town Council, and Dorset Council. The town council is meets at the Village Hall at Towers Way. On 10 December 2019, the Corfe Mullen Parish Council resolved to adopt Town Council status, citing potential financial benefits, with the positions of chairman and vice-chairman becoming entitled to be Mayor and Deputy Mayor, respectively. Duncan Sowry-House became the inaugural Mayor of Corfe Mullen.

=== Administrative history ===
Until 2019, Corfe Mullen came under the lower-tier authority of East Dorset District Council, with county-level services provided by Dorset County Council. Both councils were set abolished following local government reorganisation, replaced with Dorset Council, a unitary authority, created from the merger of the existing non-metropolitan districts of Weymouth and Portland, West Dorset, North Dorset, Purbeck and East Dorset. The authority came into being on 1 April 2019.

On Dorset Council, Corfe Mullen is represented by an eponymous electoral ward with two councillors; currently Duncan Sowry-House (Liberal Democrats) and Scott Florek (Liberal Democrats), since the 2024 local elections.

=== Parliamentary representation ===
Corfe Mullen is represented by Mid Dorset and North Poole in the House of Commons. The seat was created in 1997 from parts of the seats of North Dorset (Corfe Mullen Central, Corfe Mullen North, Corfe Mullen South, Lytchett Matravers, and Lytchett Minster wards), Poole (Broadstone, Canford Heath, Canford Magna, and Creekmoor wards), South Dorset (Bere Regis, St Martin, and Wareham wards), and Bournemouth West (Alderney ward), and has been held by Vikki Slade since the 2024 general election. Corfe Mullen was part of the South West England constituency for elections to the European Parliament.

== Facilities ==
Corfe Mullen is a dormitory settlement for people working in the nearby towns and cities of Wimborne, Poole, Bournemouth, Ferndown, Verwood and Southampton. It is one of the biggest villages in England. The countryside around the village is split between agriculture and heathland, with woodland to be found fringing most areas, the largest of which is Stoney Down Plantation to the west. The existence of many bridleways criss-crossing the area around the village encourages horse riding, and there are a number of stables nearby. The village also has a large recreation ground with facilities for outdoor sports, including football, cricket and tennis. This is run by the Corfe Mullen Sports Association, which is made up of volunteers from various sports clubs around Corfe Mullen. There are new allotments on Broadmoor Road that have been in use since 1 November 2019, replacing the old allotments near Lockyer's School which are being built on.

St Hubert's, the 13th century parish church, is a grade II* listed building.

Corfe Mullen is served by Corfe Hills School, a state secondary school, and Castle Court School, a private school for 3- to 13-year-olds, alongside three state primary schools.

=== Nature park ===
In June 2016, Corfe Barrows Nature Park was opened. The nature park comprises eight natural areas, two of which lie wholly or partially within Corfe Mullen: the Happy Bottom Nature Reserve and Cogdean Elms. The remaining areas lie just over the municipal boundary within the Borough of Poole, but are easily accessible from the village.

== Demographics ==
As of 2024, the Corfe Mullen electoral ward (which is currently coterminous with the civil parish) had an estimated population of 10,686, with an area of 12.27 km^{2}. The ethnic makeup of the ward was 95.3% white British and 4.7% black and minority ethnic population. The religious composition of the village was 47.7% Christian, 45.0% No Religion, 0.4% Muslim, 0.2% Buddhist, 0.1% Hindu, 0.1% Jewish, and 0.5% belonged to another religion.

Census population of Corfe Mullen parish
Census	Population	Female	Male	Households	Source
1921	952				
1931	1,304				
1951	2,041				
1961	3,235				
1971	4,590				
1981	8,330				
1991	9,570				
2001	10,147	5,223	4,924	4,058	
2011	10,133	5,177	4,956	4,078	
2021	10,374	5,252	5,122	4,296	

== Notable residents ==
- Tim Berners-Lee and his wife Jane, in the late 1970s, when working at Plessey.
- Isaac Gulliver, the famous smuggler lived in Highe House in East End.
- William Joyce, better known as 'Lord Haw-Haw', once lived in the Court House.
- Anjana Khatwa, English earth scientist, currently lives there.
- Gladys Mitchell, the detective writer and creator of Mrs Bradley, lived in the village at the end of her life.
- Hugh Miles, British filmmaker who specialises in wildlife films is based there.
