= Lytchett Matravers =

Village and civil parish in Dorset, England

Coordinates: 50.7582°N 2.0791°W

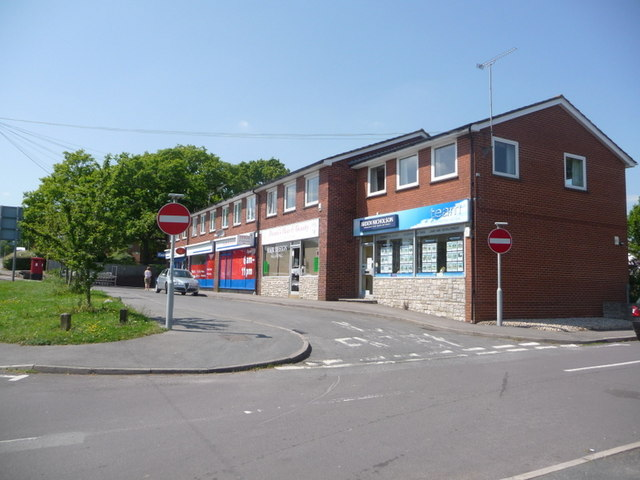
- Shops on High Street

- Location within Dorset
- Population: 3,424 (parish, 2011 Census)
- OS grid reference: SY946952
- Civil parish: Lytchett Matravers
- Unitary authority: Dorset
- Ceremonial county: Dorset
- Region: South West
- Country: England
- Sovereign state: United Kingdom
- Post town: Poole
- Postcode district: BH16
- Dialling code: 01202
- Police: Dorset
- Fire: Dorset and Wiltshire
- Ambulance: South Western
- UK Parliament: Mid Dorset and North Poole
- Website: Lytchett Matravers Parish Council

Lytchett Matravers (/ˈlɪtʃɪt məˈtrævərz/) is a large village and civil parish in Dorset, England. The 2011 census recorded the parish as having 1,439 households and a population of 3,424.

== Etymology ==
The name of Lytchett Matravers is first attested in the Domesday Book of 1086 as Lichet. This name comes from the Brittonic words that survive in modern Welsh as llwyd ("grey") and coed ("wood"). The name is first attested with addition of Matravers in 1280, in forms such as Lichet Mautravers. This was used to distinguish the settlement from Lytchett Minster and arose because, following the Norman Conquest, William I granted the manor to Hugh Maltravers, attested as the owner of the estate in the Domesday book. (Prior to the Conquest, a Danish lord called Tholf held the manor.)

An alternative derivation of the name Lytchett is from the word lynchet or linchet, which is an earth terrace found on the side of a hill. Lynchets are a feature of ancient field systems of the British Isles. Such terraces were visible in Garden Wood above the Church and Manor in the 1970's.

== History ==
Following the Norman Conquest, the Maltravers family held the village for about 300 years, until the Black Death reduced the population in the second half of the 14th century. The surviving villagers deserted the original village, sited around the church and manor house, and resettled further up the hill.

The remaining female heir to the title "in abeyance", Eleanor Maltravers, inherited the title on the death of her sister, Joan, in or after 1376. She married John FitzAlan, 1st Baron Arundel on 17 February 1359.

The estate was later bought from the Arundels by the Trenchard family, who demolished the former manor house and built a new one that incorporated, amongst other facilities, a ballroom and a tower. When the Trenchard family foundered in 1829, the manor passed to the Dillon family who added the name Trenchard to their own. However, the newly titled Dillon-Trenchards chose not to occupy the newer manor house. The Dillon-Trenchards left Lytchett Matravers in the latter part of the 20th century.In 2005 mr R G Horlock took on the Lordship of Lytchett being one of the only surviving relatives of sir John maltravers.

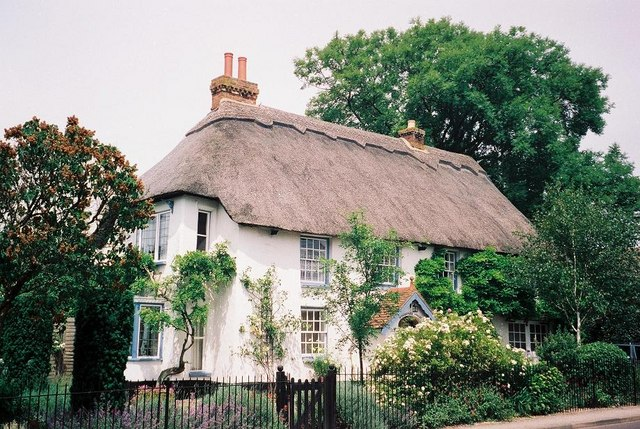
Prospect House, an early 19th-century cottage on Wareham Road

Lytchett Matravers has developed over the 20th century from a settlement of mostly scattered cottages with large curtilages to a village with a moderately high housing density. In the 1920s and 1930s there was some ribbon development on the main access road. This continued into the 1950s with the addition of small scale infill housing behind. Since the 1970s development has mainly been through housing estates. In the 1960s and early 1970s many of the original cob and thatch cottages were either demolished or greatly altered, but there are still 13 thatched cottages in the village, some of which retain their original curtilage. Recently some modern developments have included a smattering of thatched houses in an acknowledgement of the local vernacular architecture.

== Governance ==
There is a Lytchett Matravers and Upton electoral ward for Dorset Council. It is larger than the parish, extending westward towards Bulbury. The 2011 Census recorded the ward's population as 3,747.

== Geography ==
The village is on higher ground in a landscape of small valleys, open fields and woods about 5 miles (8 km) northwest of Poole and a similar distance north of Wareham. The elevation gives views from many parts of the village to Poole Harbour and the Purbeck hills. The village is in the Green Belt of the South East Dorset conurbation. To the northeast are the plantations of Henbury and Stoney Down and to the south the woods of Lytchett Heath.

The village is on what until 150 years ago was the main road between Poole and Dorchester. There is some through traffic through the village between the main A350 and A35.

== Religion ==
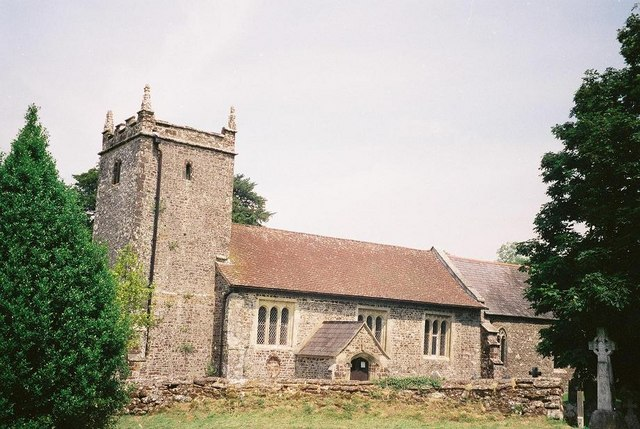
St Mary the Virgin parish church

The parish church of St Mary the Virgin is 1/4 mile (400 m) northwest of the modern village, on the former site of the village deserted in the 14th century. The church's west tower is 13th-century, the chancel is 14th-century and the rest of the church was rebuilt in about 1500. It is a Grade I listed building. The west tower has six bells, the oldest of which was cast in about 1400.

Near the middle of the village is a Methodist church, which is a member of Poole Bay Methodist Circuit.

== Amenities ==
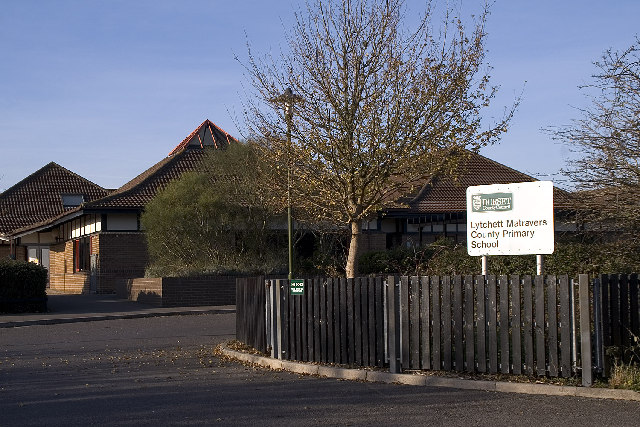
Lytchett Matravers Primary School, built in 1992

Lytchett Matravers has two pubs: the Chequers Inn and the Rose and Crown.

The village Primary School is situated in a large modern building on the Wareham Road, having moved from its former home near the central crossroad. The village school dates from around 1837 when about 30 children attended a National Society School built near to the higher crossroads. In 1875 education for all children became compulsory and the Board School was built on land on the opposite corner of the crossroads. Children were taught there for 115 years before the present school for over 400 pupils was built and opened in 1992. Secondary education is provided by Lytchett Minster Secondary School.

The Village Hall was built in 1972, to replace the ailing Victory Hall and has magnificent views over Poole Harbour. The hall is a central meeting place for all kinds of village activities including many sports and keep-fit classes.

The Lytchett Martavers Parish Council also maintain a small office there.

The Lytchett Matravers Youth Hall and Cadet Hall are situated between 72e & 74 High Street. The Youth Hall originated in the 1950s and has undergone extensive regeneration with the benefit of a grant from the Dorst Council and the UK Shared Prosperity Fund/Rural England Prosperity Fund in 2024. The Youth Club now runs every Tuesday evening with many other youth and community activities throughout the week, including a Warm Welcome cafe on a Wednesday. The Cadets also run sessions every Monday and Thursday

The Sports Pavilion and Scout Hut sit centrally off the High Street between the lower and upper car parks and overlook the large, tree lined recreation ground. The Rec features a central football area, plus the Rocket Park children's play area and a Skate Park and dog-exercise area. The Sports Pavilion is home to the Lytchett Matravers Football Club who run soccer clubs for minis and youth in the village. The Scout Hut is home to Beavers, Cubs and Scouts, and is available to hire for community activities.

The Lion Hall and old British Legion buildings were demolished to make way for new housing estates

== Economy ==
A small number of businesses run in or from the village. Most of those of working age however, commute elsewhere in Dorset for their work, chiefly to Poole and Bournemouth.

== Sport and recreation ==
There is a cricket club in the village. For children there are Beavers, Cubs, Brownies, Scouts, Guides, an Army Cadet Force Detachment and a Youth Parish Council.

Lytchett Matravers Detachment (The Rifles), Dorset Army Cadet Force, is located opposite the Chequers Inn. The current centre was opened in September 1995, and is to this day home to a successful ACF unit.

The monthly Parish Magazine includes articles on the activities of 12 clubs and societies in the village.

For many years, the village has held a traditional carnival in June.

== Twinning ==
The village is twinned with the French village of Les Pieux, 13 miles (21 km) from Cherbourg.
