= Castle Court School =

Location
- Knoll Lane; Corfe Mullen, Dorset, BH21 3RF; England; 50.7742°N 2.0322°W

Information
- Type: Preparatory school
- Motto: Dominus Dat Sapientiam
- Religious affiliation: Interdenominational
- Established: 1948
- Founders: Donald and Mary Scott
- Department for Education URN: 113931 Tables
- Headmaster: Katie Johnson
- Gender: Coeducational
- Age: 2 to 13
- Enrolment: 325 as of 2018
- Website: http://www.castlecourt.com/

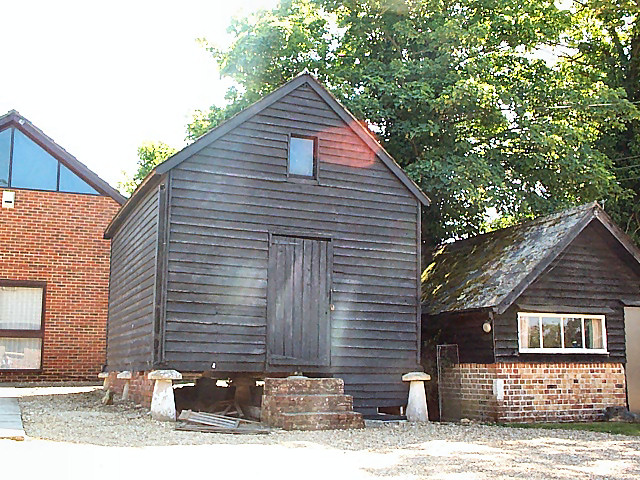
Preserved barn in the grounds of the school—note the staddle stones at each corner

Castle Court School is a co-educational, preparatory school located near the village of Corfe Mullen in the county of Dorset, England.

== Location ==
Castle Court School is located in 35 acres of grounds in rural countryside and centred on a small hill called Knoll Clump. It is about a mile northwest of the centre of Corfe Mullen, 4 miles north-northwest of Poole, 8 miles northwest of Bournemouth and 9 miles southeast of Blandford Forum. Much of the surrounding country is farmland, but the forest plantations of Henbury and Stoney Down are about a mile to the west and southwest of the school.

== History ==
Castle Court School was founded in 1948 by teacher, Donald Scott, and his wife, Mary, initially as a local boys, preparatory, day school. It was originally based at Castle Hill in the Parkstone quarter of Poole.

In 1968, having outgrown its first home, the school moved ten miles away to a large house, Knoll Cottage, with a 35-acre estate, at Corfe Mullen. The house was built in the 1780s for a member of the Coventry family.

In the 1970s the school began admitting girls for the first time. It added a pre-prep department in the 80s and now has a nursery. By 2009, the school had around 300 pupils of whom about 60% were boys.

== Ethos ==
The school was founded by the Scotts "to provide a first-class Christian education". Today, strong Christian principles still underpin all it does, although it welcomes pupils of all faiths. A very high priority is placed on pastoral care and also on principles such as sensitivity, thoughtfulness and consideration for others.

== Curriculum ==
The school teaches to the National Curriculum, with the pupils taking national tests like SATs. From Year 6 (ages 10+) upwards, Castle Court prepares the pupils for Common Entrance, which they take in Year 8. CE is only compulsory to those pupils who are planning to go to an Independent secondary school.

== Head teachers ==
- Donald Scott, 1948–1978
- Mary Scott, 1978–1989
- Richard Nicholl, 1989–2010
- Richard Stevenson, 2010–2018
- Luke Gollings 2018–2023
- Andy Pilkington 2023–2024
- Katie Johnson 2024–current
