= Marnhull =

Village and civil parish in Dorset, England

Coordinates: 50.9675°N 2.3119°W

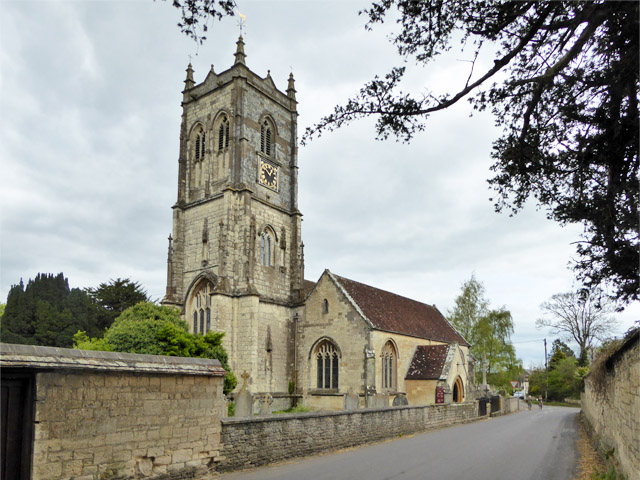
- Parish church of St Gregory

- Location within Dorset
- Population: 2,035 (2021 census)
- OS grid reference: ST782188
- Civil parish: Marnhull
- Unitary authority: Dorset
- Ceremonial county: Dorset
- Region: South West
- Country: England
- Sovereign state: United Kingdom
- Post town: Sturminster Newton
- Postcode district: DT10
- Police: Dorset
- Fire: Dorset and Wiltshire
- Ambulance: South Western
- UK Parliament: North Dorset

Marnhull (/ˈmɑːrnəl/ MAR-nəl) is a village and civil parish in Dorset, southern England. It lies in the Blackmore Vale, three miles (five kilometres) north of Sturminster Newton and 18 miles (29 km) north of Dorchester. Marnhull is sited on a low ridge of Corallian limestone above the valley of the River Stour, which forms the northern and western boundaries of the parish. In the 2021 census the parish had a population of 2,035.

Marnhull consists of several conjoined hamlets, connected by a network of minor roads. The village presents a mix of architectural styles, with post-war developments existing alongside properties dating back to Tudor times and earlier. It has three churches (Anglican, Roman Catholic and Methodist), two primary schools, two public houses, a GP surgery, a village hall and a recreation ground, as well as various small shops and services. The parish church of St Gregory has a 15th-century tower which is a landmark and has been described as "the finest in the Vale."

== History ==
Saxon charters show that Marnhull existed as a village in the 10th century, although the village's site has seen human occupation as early as the Iron Age, and a Roman settlement was established at Ashley Wood in the east of the parish. The Domesday Book of 1086 does not mention Marnhull by name, though the constituent settlements of Walton Elm, Burton and Kentleworth were probably recorded under the entry for Sturminster Newton as the eight hides of land owned by Waleran, Roger and Chetel. The eastern part of Marnhull parish used to be a separate parish, named Thorton, until the 16th century. Until 1763 Marnhull was the site of an annual bull-baiting event, taking place every 3 May. The event was stopped as a response to the violence and bloodshed it engendered, not just in Marnhull but also in surrounding villages.

== Governance ==
Marnhull is in the constituency of North Dorset, currently represented in the UK parliament by the Conservative Simon Hoare.

Marnhull is part of the Stalbridge and Marnhull ward which elects 1 member to Dorset Council.

== Geography ==
Marnhull civil parish covers about 3,800 acres (1,500 hectares) at an elevation of about 50 to 90 metres (160 to 300 feet). The western boundary of the parish is formed by the River Stour and the eastern by the Key Brook, a tributary of the Stour. The central part of the parish is drained by Chivrick's Brook, a tributary of the Key Brook. These watercourses all drain north to south. From west to east the geology of the parish comprises a thin strip of Oxford clay around the Stour, a long ridge of Corallian sand and limestone between the Stour and Chivrick's Brook, then lower-lying Kimmeridge clay between Chivrick's Brook and the eastern boundary. Marnhull village is sited on the ridge of Corallian beds, which form the highest part of the parish and are the source of the building stone extensively used throughout it.

== Culture ==
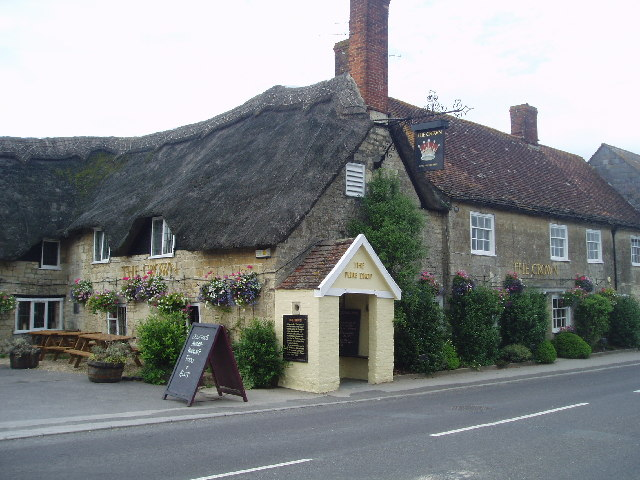
The Crown Inn, Marnhull

Thomas Hardy described Marnhull as 'Marlott' in his novel Tess of the d'Urbervilles. The Crown Inn is described by Hardy as 'The Pure Drop Inn', and The Blackmore Vale Inn is described as 'Rollivers' - a disreputable and illegal drinking house, where secret ale drinking groups gathered upstairs. The television adaptation of the book was filmed in the village.

== Demographics ==
Census population of Marnhull parish
| Census | Population | Households |
|---|---|---|
| 2001 | 1,951 | 884 |
| 2011 | 1,998 | 805 |
| 2021 | 2,035 | 945 |

== Notable residents ==
- Catherine Parr the last of Henry VIII's wives was given the original manor of Nash Court in 1544. From her it passed to Edward VI and then to Elizabeth I after which it passed through the families of several noblemen and eminent civilians.
- Giles Hussey was born here and lived at Nash House before studying art in Italy.
- William Gosling (footballer) was living at Lovells Court, Marnhull, at the 1911 Census.
- Sir Peter Harding, GCB, (born 2 December 1933) is a retired Royal Air Force Chief of the Air Staff, and Chief of Defence Staff.
