= Sturminster Newton =

Town in Dorset, England

Coordinates: 50.9261°N 2.3051°W

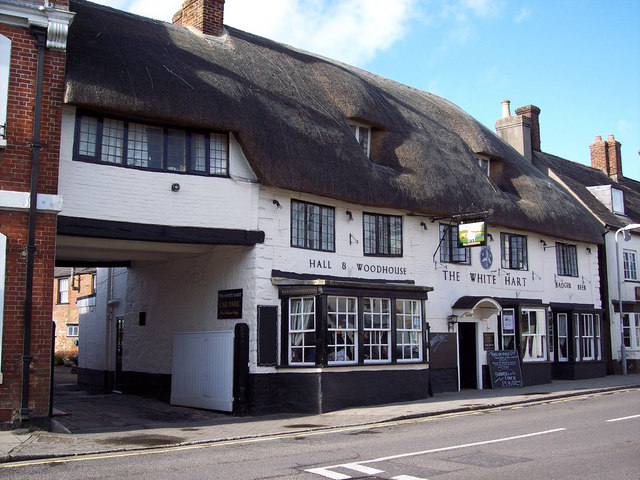
- The White Hart, Market Cross

- Coat of arms of Sturminster Newton Town Council

- Location within Dorset
- Population: 4,292 (2011)
- OS grid reference: ST786140
- Unitary authority: Dorset
- Ceremonial county: Dorset
- Region: South West
- Country: England
- Sovereign state: United Kingdom
- Post town: STURMINSTER NEWTON
- Postcode district: DT10
- Dialling code: 01258
- Police: Dorset
- Fire: Dorset and Wiltshire
- Ambulance: South Western
- UK Parliament: North Dorset
- Website: https://sturminster-newton.org.uk/

Sturminster Newton is a town and civil parish situated on the River Stour in the north of Dorset, England. The town is at the centre of the Blackmore Vale, a large dairy agriculture region around which the town's economy is built, and is known as 'the heart of the Blackmore vale'.

The town has shops, a primary and secondary school – Sturminster Newton High School – and a school and college catering for children with special educational needs. A market is held in the town on Mondays. One of the largest cattle markets in England used to be held here, but it was closed in 1998.

The town is noted for its connections with the authors Thomas Hardy and William Barnes, and as part of the historic West Country Carnival circuit.

== History ==
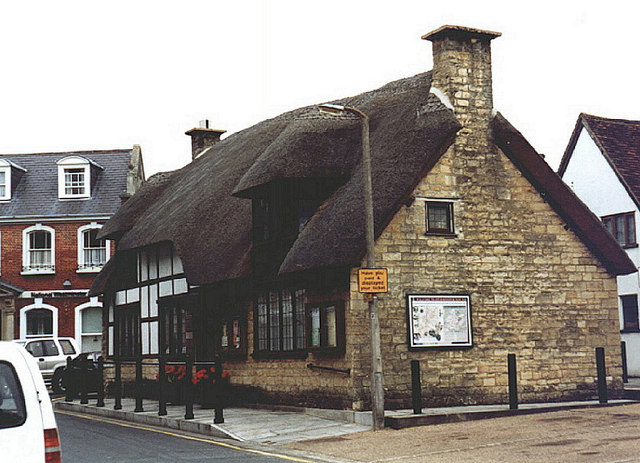
Sturminster Newton Museum in the Old Market Cross House

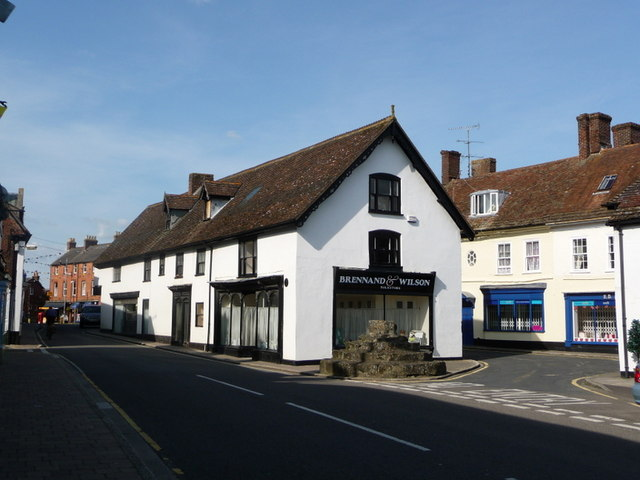
The town centre, showing the remains of the 15th-century market cross.

Sturminster Newton was recorded in an Anglo-Saxon charter in 968 as Nywetone at Stoure, and in the Domesday Book of 1086 as Newentone. Newton refers to a new farm or estate, and Sturminster to a church (minster) on the Stour. Originally the two parts of the name referred to the settlements on the north and south of the river, but were combined to distinguish the town from Sturminster Marshall and other Newtons. The history of the town and surrounding area has been researched by the Sturminster Newton Heritage Trust, which runs the Sturminster Newton Museum in the Old Market Cross House in the centre of town. The Museum is open to visitors on some days every week.

Hidden on the hill above the bridge over the river are the ruins of Sturminster Newton Castle, a manor house rather than a defensive building. The 14th-century building stands on a crescent shaped mound which could be the site of an Iron Age hillfort. The town and castle were part of Sturminster Newton hundred.

Sturminster Newton is situated at a historic fording point on the River Stour. The ford was replaced in the 16th century with a six-arch stone bridge, and a quarter-kilometre embankment crossing the flood plain. The bridge was widened from 12 to 18 feet (3.7 to 5.5 metres) in 1820. A 19th-century plaque affixed to the bridge states that anyone damaging the bridge would be transported to Australia as a felon.

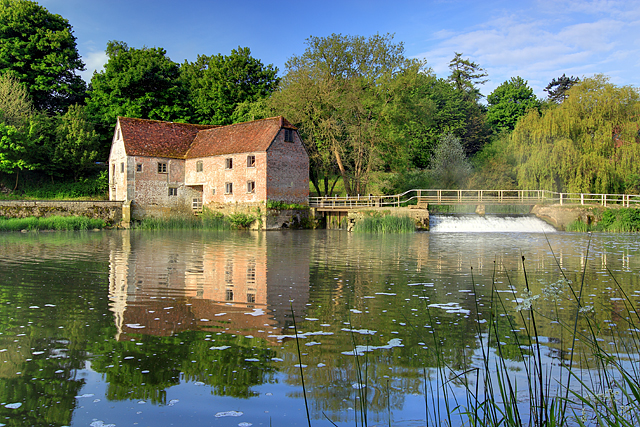
Sturminster Newton Mill

The Sturminster Newton Heritage Trust runs the Sturminster Newton Mill on the south bank of the river and which has existed since at least 1016. The mill was restored in 1980 and is now a working museum watermill which is open to visitors on some days every week between the end of March and the end of September. The mill resumed commercial production of flour in 2020.

The town centre is built in a mixture of styles, including 17th- and 18th-century thatched cottages, Georgian stone buildings, and 19th-century brick buildings. Set back from the main road is the market square and parish church of St Mary, which was rebuilt in 1486 by the abbots of Glastonbury Abbey. The church was heavily modified in the 19th century, but the carved wagon roof remains.

Sturminster Newton railway station was served by the Somerset and Dorset Railway, which ran through the town from 1863 until it was dismantled in 1966 as part of the Beeching Axe. The railway goods yard gave milk trains access to the private sidings of the local creamery. Started in 1913 by local farmers to produce cheddar cheese and pasteurised milk, it was taken over by the Milk Marketing Board in 1937. Milk trains ceased in 1966 on closure of the line, with the creamery remaining in operation until 2000 under successor Dairy Crest. The station and goods yard were demolished in the mid-1970s.

The town is set in the vale on which Thomas Hardy based his fictional Vale of the little dairies (in his novel Tess of the d'Urbervilles) and Sturminster had the largest cattle market in Europe, which stood close to the town centre until it was closed and demolished in 1997.

== Governance ==
Sturminster Newton electoral ward elects one member to Dorset Council. The town also has a town council of 11 members.

In the UK parliament, Sturminster is in the North Dorset parliamentary constituency which is currently represented by Simon Hoare of the Conservative party.

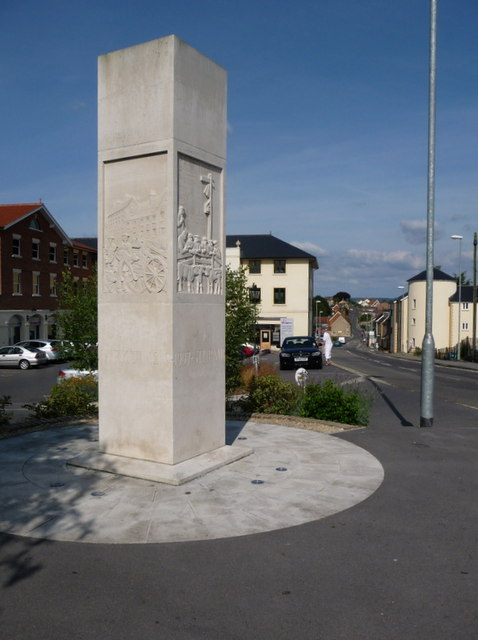
Sculpted column commemorating the former cattle market that was first established in 1219

== Geography ==
Sturminster Newton civil parish covers about 4,550 acres (1,840 hectares) at an elevation of 45 to 119 metres (148 to 390 feet), with the highest ground being in the southeast. The parish includes the small settlements of Bagber, Broad Oak and Puxey.

The town is situated on a meander of the River Stour. The larger part of the town (Sturminster) lies on a low limestone ridge to the north side of the river, and includes most shops and services, whilst to the south is the smaller Newton, separated by a wide flood plain.

The geology of the parish comprises Oxford clay in the northwest, Corallian limestone and sands in the northeast, centre and southwest, and Kimmeridge clay in the southeast.

To the southeast of the town are Girdlers Coppice and Piddles Wood, areas of mature woodland that are designated as sites of special scientific interest.

== Demography ==
Census data is for Sturminster Newton civil parish.

Census population of Sturminster Newton parish
Census	Population	Female	Male	Households	Source
1921	1,619				
1931	1,708				
1951	1,799				
1961	1,958				
1971	2,110				
1981	2,240				
1991	2,490				
2001	3,105	1,632	1,473	1,412	
2011	4,292	2,183	2,109	1,910	
2021	4,408	2,256	2,152	1,988	

== Religion and culture ==
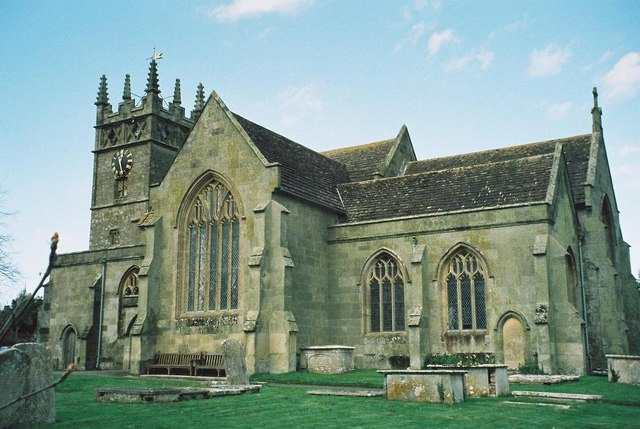
Parish church of St Mary

St Mary's Church is a Church of England parish church, dating from a rebuild in 1486 by the abbots of Glastonbury. The church was heavily modified in the 19th century, but the carved wagon roof remains. It is designated as a grade I listed building by Historic England.

Sturminster Newton is the home of the annual UK Boogie Woogie Festival, which in 2009 saw an appearance from veteran boogie woogie star Little Willie Littlefield.

The Exchange, a community arts and conference centre, on Old Market Hill, was built on the site of the old cattle market. It was officially opened by Julian Fellowes in December 2007 and provides a venue for music concerts, drama and other events.

The Dorset Bach Cantata Club is based in Sturminster Newton. Sturminster Newton United F.C., founded in 1871, play in the Dorset Premier Football League.

== Media ==
Local news and television programmes are provided by BBC West and ITV West Country. Television signals are received from the Mendip TV transmitter, BBC South and ITV Meridian can also be received from the Rowridge TV transmitter.

Local radio stations are BBC Radio Solent, Greatest Hits Radio South (formerly Vale FM), and Abbey104, a community based radio station that broadcast from its studio in Sherborne.

The Dorset Echo is the local newspaper that serves the town.

== Twin towns ==
Sturminster Newton is twinned with Montebourg in Normandy, France.

== Notable people ==
- William Barnes (1801–1886)
- Bryan "Badger" Goss (born 1940), Motocross rider
- Thomas Hardy (1840–1928) and his wife Emma lived in the town from 1876 to 1878, and he wrote his 1878 The Return of the Native during this time.
- Keith Kyle (1925–2007), writer, broadcaster and historian, was born in the town
- Eden Paul (1865–1944), physician, translator, communist activist, was born in the town
- Mark Price, Baron Price (born 1961), UK Minister of Trade and Investment and former managing director of Waitrose, lives in the town.
