= John Bastard =

John Bastard may refer to:

- John Bastard (c. 1688–1770), architect, one of the Bastard brothers
- John Pollexfen Bastard (1756–1816), MP for Devonshire
- John Bastard (naval officer) (c. 1787–1835), Royal Navy officer, MP for Dartmouth
- John Bastard (cricketer) (1817–1848), British cricketer

== See also ==
- John I Doukas of Thessaly (died 1289), also known as John the Bastard
- Bastard (surname), including a list of people with the surname
- Bastard (disambiguation)
