= Bastard =

Bastard or The Bastard may refer to:

== Parentage ==
- Illegitimate child, a child born to unmarried parents, in traditional Western family law
  - Bastard, an archaic term used in English and Welsh bastardy laws, reformed in 1926

== People ==
- "The Bastard", a character in Shakespeare's play King John
- "The Bastard", ring name for Pac (wrestler) (born Benjamin Satterley, 1986)
- Bastard (surname), including a list of people with that name
- List of people known as the Bastard

== Film and television ==
- Bastard (1940 film), a Swedish-Norwegian film
- The Bastard (1954 film), a 1954 Argentine film directed by Lucas Demare
- The Bastard (1963 film), by Seijun Suzuki
- The Bastard (1978 film), based on the John Jakes novel
- Bastard (1997 film), a Polish-German-French film
- Bastard, a 2010 short film directed by Kirsten Dunst
- The Bastard (2023 film), a Danish-language film by Nikolaj Arcel
- The Bastard (miniseries), a 1978 made-for-television adaptation of the John Jakes novel
- I bastardi (The Bastards), the original Italian title of the 1968 film released in English as The Cats

== Music ==
=== Albums ===
- Bastard (Colin Newman album), 1997
- Bastard (Stahlmann album) or the title song, 2017
- Bastard (Tyler, the Creator album) or the title song, 2009
- Bastard, by Bunii, 2025
- Bastard, by Kat, 1992
- Bastard, by Subway to Sally, 2007
- The Bastard (album), by Hammers of Misfortune, 2001
- The Bastard, by BZN, 1971

=== Songs ===
- "Bastard", by Ben Folds from Songs for Silverman, 2005
- "Bastard", by David Byrne from Lead Us Not into Temptation, 2003
- "Bastard", by Devin Townsend from Ocean Machine: Biomech, 1997
- "Bastard", by Dope from American Apathy, 2005
- "Bastard", by Dysrhythmia from Pretest, 2003
- "Bastard", by Glaive from All Dogs Go to Heaven, 2021
- "Bastard", by Ian Hunter from You're Never Alone with a Schizophrenic, 1979
- "Bastard", by Mötley Crüe from Shout at the Devil, 1983
- "Bastard", by Oomph! from Unrein, 1998
- "Bastard", by Soulfly from Enslaved, 2012
- "Bastard (Satan's Kid)", by Lil Wayne from Funeral, 2020
- "The Bastard", by Pet Lamb from Sweaty Handshake, 1995
- "The Bastard", by the Tragically Hip from Music @ Work, 2000

== Publications ==
- The Bastard, a 1929 novel by Erskine Caldwell
- Bastard!!, a manga by Kazushi Hagiwara (since 1988)
- The Bastard (novel), 1974, by John Jakes
- "Bâtard" ("Bastard" or "Mongrel"), a 1902 short story by Jack London
- Der momzer (The Bastard), a Yiddish play by Jacob Mikhailovich Gordin
- La Bâtarde, memoir by Violette Leduc

== Fonts ==
- Bastard (typeface), a blackletter typeface
- Bastarda or bastard, a Gothic script

== Other uses ==
- Bastard Township, Ontario, Canada
- Bastard, a classification of the teeth of a metalworking file
- Bastard, a second-rate wine, distinguished from sack
- The Bastard, the horse that won the 1930 Yorkshire Cup

== See also ==
- Bastard of Winterfell, alias name of Jon Snow (character), in Game of Thrones
- Bastardia, a genus of flowering plants
- Bastardisation (disambiguation)
- Bastardo (disambiguation)
- Bastards (disambiguation)
- Bastardy (film), a 2008 Australian documentary film
- Bastardy (play), 1972, by Australian playwright John Romeril
- Baster, a descendant of liaisons between the Cape Colony Dutch and indigenous Africans
- Fat Bastard, Austin Powers character
- Vyvyan Basterd, a character in 80s British comedy series The Young Ones
- Alan and Sara B'Stard, characters in the 1987 TV series The New Statesman
- Bastardstown, a coastal town in County Wexford, Ireland
