= French toast =

Dish of fried bread and eggs

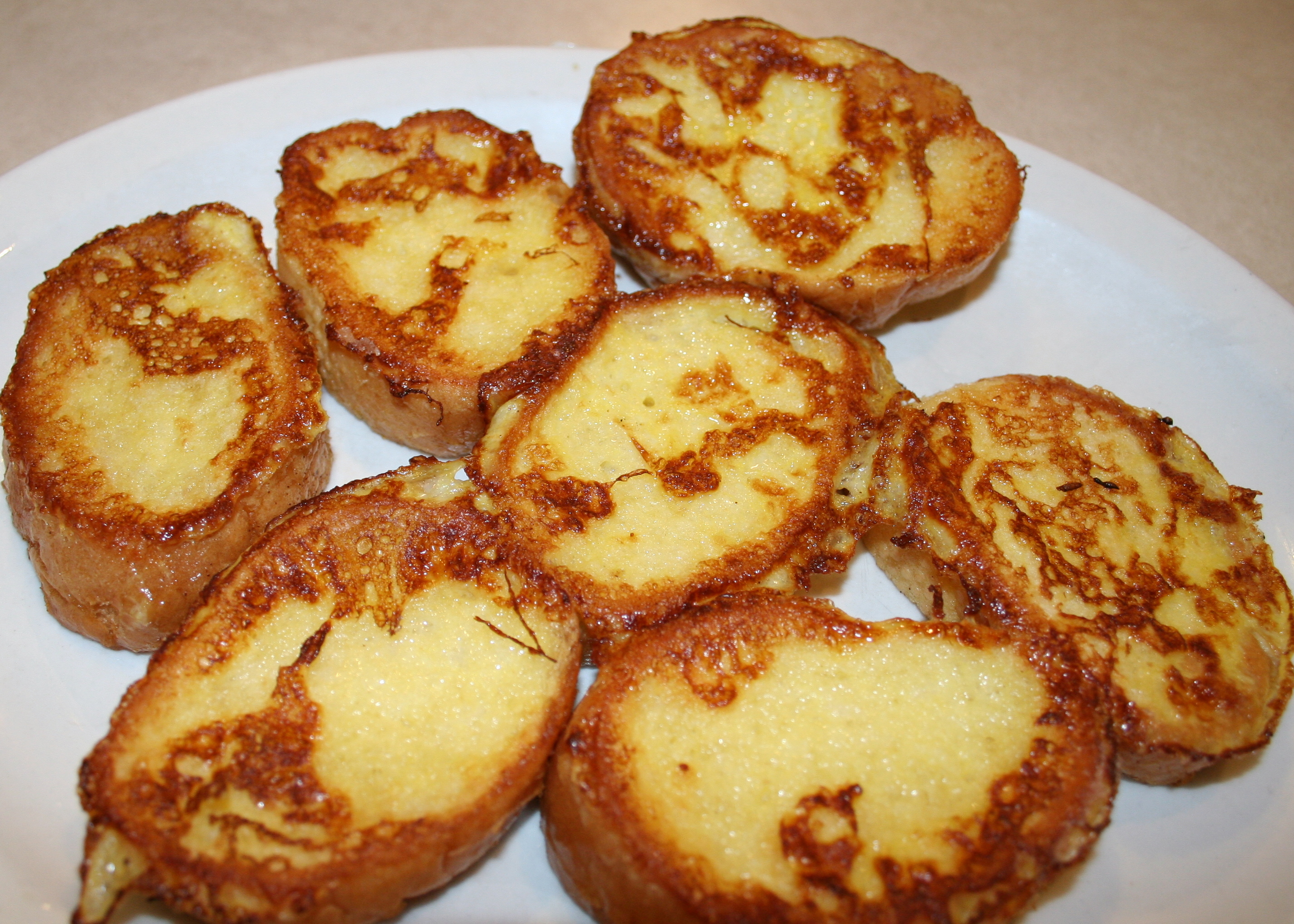
- French toast served at a restaurant
- Serving temperature: Hot, with toppings
- Main ingredients: Bread, eggs
- Ingredients generally used: Milk or cream, herbs, spices, sauces, syrups
- Variations: Sweet

French toast is a dish of sliced bread soaked in beaten eggs and often milk or cream, then pan-fried. Alternative names and variants include eggy bread, Bombay toast, gypsy toast, and poor knights (of Windsor).

When French toast is served as a sweet dish, sugar, vanilla, and cinnamon are also commonly added before pan-frying, and then it may be topped with sugar (often powdered sugar), butter, fruit, or syrup. When it is a savoury dish, it is generally fried with a pinch of salt or pepper, and it can then be served with a sauce such as ketchup or mayonnaise.

== Names ==
This dish occurs in various forms and under different names in many places, but this article calls it "French toast" for convenience.

=== French ===
The usual French name is pain perdu (French: [pɛ̃ pɛʁdy]) 'lost bread', reflecting its use of stale or otherwise "lost" bread. It may also be called pain doré 'golden bread' in Canada.

=== German ===
An Austrian and Bavarian term is Pofesen because the shape of the dish is reminiscent of medieval knights' shields from the city of Pavia.

=== Hungarian ===
In Hungarian, it is commonly called bundáskenyér (lit. 'furry bread').

=== Finnish ===
In Finland it is commonly called köyhät ritarit.

=== Dutch ===
In the Netherlands and Flanders, Belgium, it is called wentelteefjes, first used in 1623, from wentel ("turn") + teefjes, diminutive plural of teef ("pastry"). A common, but unlikely belief is that teef means bitch (female dog) here. It is also popularly believed to be a bastardization of wentel-'t-even(tjes) ("turn it for a (little) bit"). In Flanders, it is also known as verloren brood, a translation of the French pain perdu ("lost bread"), or gewonnen brood ("reclaimed bread").

== History ==
The Apicius, a 1st-century CE Ancient Roman cookbook, includes a recipe under Aliter Dulcia 'another sweet dish' which some authors consider "not very different" from modern French toast; others say "this isn't real French toast because it has no egg in it". The Latin text does not include eggs, but some translations include egg as an editorial interpolation. The recipe (Grocock 7.11.3) cooks milk-soaked bread chunks and pours honey over them. A different recipe called Aliter Dulcia (7.11.4) does include eggs but not bread and gives a sort of custard, not French toast.

In Le Viandier, a cookbook written around 1300, the French chef Guillaume Taillevent presented a recipe for tostées dorées involving eggs and sugar.

A 14th-century German recipe uses the name Arme Ritter 'poor knights', a name also used in English and the Nordic languages.

In the 15th century, there are English recipes for pain perdu and culinary expert Martino da Como also offers a recipe.

In Spain, one of the first recipes was published in 1611 by Francisco Martínez Motiño.

Hannah Woolley included a recipe in her 1670s cookbook The Queen-Like Closet. She did not call it "French."

== Preparation ==
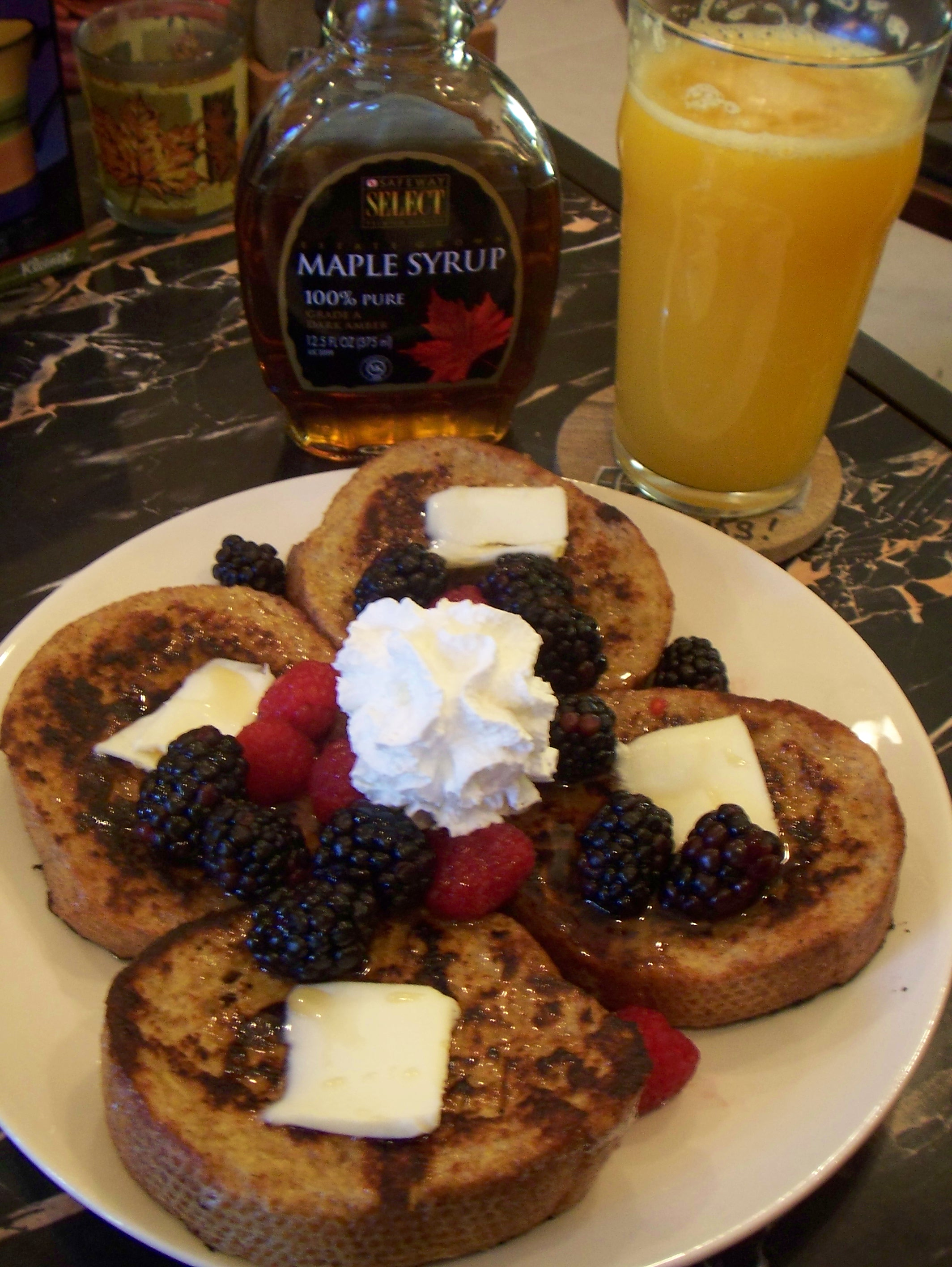
French toast topped with fruit, butter and cream, served with maple syrup

Slices of bread are soaked or dipped in a mixture of beaten eggs, often whisked with milk or cream. Sugar, cinnamon, nutmeg, and vanilla may be added to the mixture. The bread is then fried in butter or olive oil until browned and cooked through. Day-old bread is often used, both for its thrift and because it will soak up more egg mixture without falling apart.

The cooked slices may be served with sugar or sweet toppings such as caramel, ice cream, jam, honey, fruit, or maple syrup.

=== Variations ===
There are many variations. The dipping mixture might not include eggs and the bread may be soaked in wine, rosewater, or orange juice, either before or after cooking.

== International versions ==
=== Asia ===
In Armenia, beeshee or bishi (Armenian: Բիշի) is a thin and crispy breakfast food. It is typically topped with sugar, simple syrup, or honey. In Georgia, kikliko (Georgian: ყიყლიყო, romanized: q'iq'liq'o) is a popular savoury dish served at brunch or breakfast dish. It may include cheese.

In India, Bombay toast or sweet French bread is sold on the streets of Mumbai by hawkers and vendors. French toast in India is usually an unsweetened dish with no milk in the batter. The egg-soaked bread is fried and may be flavoured with salt, fried onions, green chilis, cilantro leaves, and other savory ingredients. It is often served with tomato ketchup (often chili-spiced ketchup).

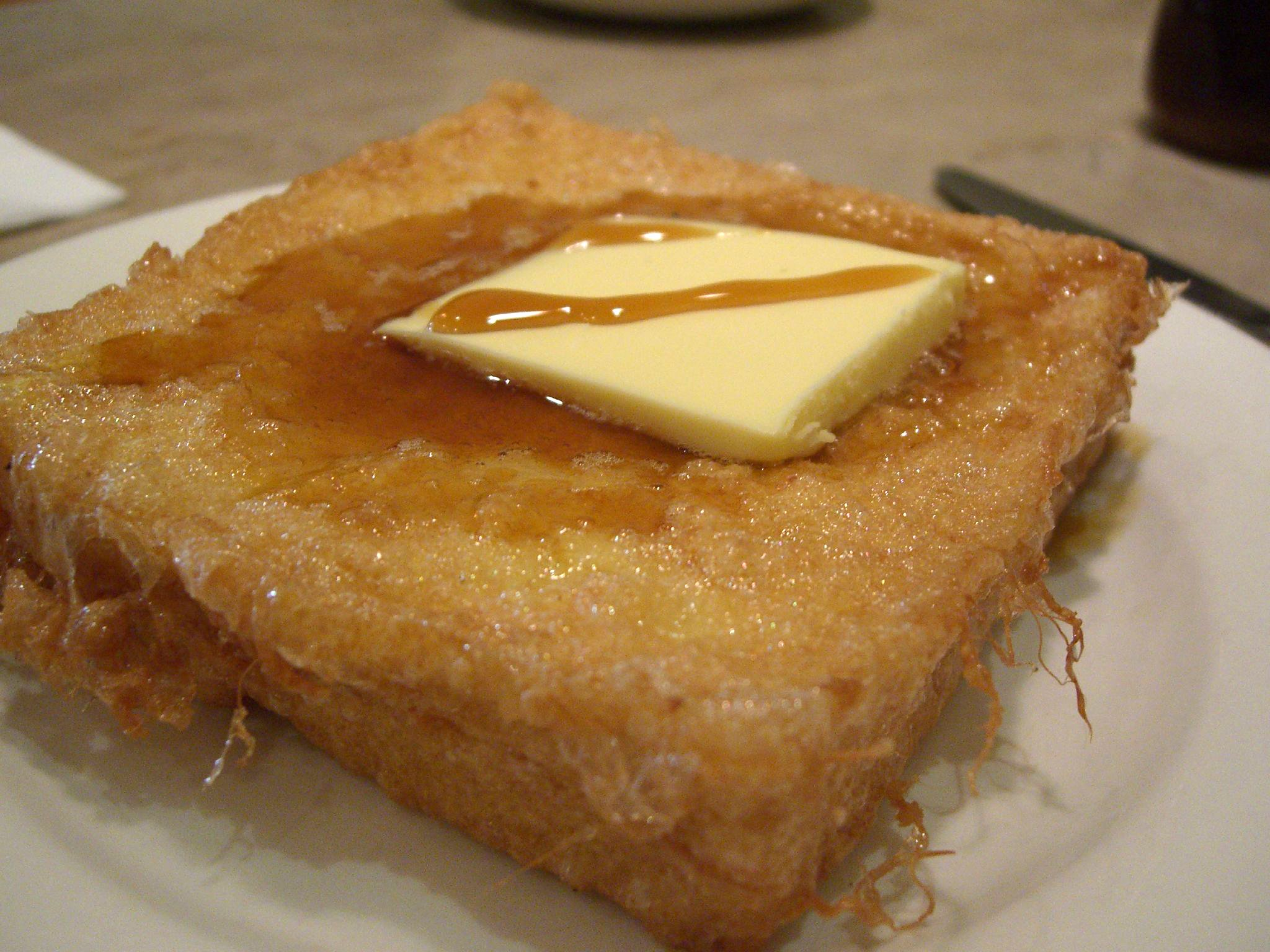
Hong Kong-style French toast

Hong Kong–style French toast (Chinese: 西多士; Cantonese Yale: sāidōsí; lit. 'western toast') is two slices of bread filled with peanut butter or fruit jam, dipped in beaten egg, then fried. It is served with butter and topped with condensed milk, golden syrup or honey. It is a typical offering in cha chaan teng (Hong Kong–style diners or teahouses). Other fillings are meat floss, kaya jam, ham, or beef satay.Through the years, cha chaan tengs and tea stalls have developed more elaborate variations of Hong Kong–style French toast. Modern versions may use Nutella, custard, taro and black sesame as toppings, as well as fillings such as red bean paste, Ovaltine and pork floss, and salted-egg "Golden Lava".

French toast is a familiar menu item in the hawker centres of Singapore, where it is often part of a breakfast set with soft-boiled eggs or coconut jam (kaya).

=== Europe ===
==== Western ====
In France, pain perdu ('lost bread') has a wide range of regional variations. In Germany, Arme Ritter ('poor knights') or Pofesen were known since at least the 14th century (mentioned in Deutsches Wörterbuch (The German Dictionary) by the Brothers Grimm). In the UK and Ireland, it is also known as eggy bread or occasionally Gypsy toast, a name that dates back to the 14th and 15th centuries. It was also called pamperdy or poor knight's pudding. Eggy bread can be served as a sweet or savoury dish, and is often served with bacon when savoury. The other names refer to the sweet version. A commercial product known as French toast is sold in packets in supermarkets but this typically contains no egg and is more similar to Melba toast.

Torrija is a similar recipe traditionally prepared in Spain for Lent and Holy Week. It is usually made by soaking stale bread in milk or wine with honey and spices. It is dipped in beaten egg and fried with olive oil. This technique breaks down the fibres of the bread and results in a pastry with a crisp outside and smooth inside. It is often sprinkled with cinnamon as a final touch. Torrijas or torrejas were first mentioned by the Spanish composer, poet and playwright Juan del Encina (1468–1533) in his Cancionero, published in 1496. "Anda acá pastor" has the following verse:

En cantares nuevos
gocen sus orejas,
miel y muchos huevos
para hacer torrejas,
aunque sin dolor
parió al Redentor.

Translation:

In new songs
enjoy your ears,
honey and many eggs
to make torrejas,
although without pain
gave birth to the Redeemer.

In the Netherlands, French toast is called wentelteefjes, verloren brood ('lost bread'), or gewonnen brood ('reclaimed bread'). It is a sweet breakfast dish that can also be eaten as an afternoon treat or evening dessert. The Dutch version of this dish often uses sugar with cinnamon instead of plain sugar. Wentelteefjes are often associated with childhood, where a grandmother provides her grandchildren with a sweet breakfast on special occasions.

==== Northern ====
In Denmark, arme riddere ('poor knights') is a sweet breakfast dish that can also be eaten as an afternoon treat or evening dessert. The Danish version of this dish uses sugar with cinnamon instead of plain sugar. In Finland, köyhät ritarit ('poor knights') is a dessert made by frying slices of wheat bread soaked in milk. Sometimes, a dried bun (pulla) is also used instead of wheat bread. An egg can also be mixed into milk and if desired, a little sugar and wheat flour can be added. The slices are dipped on both sides in the milk mixture before frying. Usually poor knights are eaten warm with jam and whipped cream. In some lunch restaurants, a dessert made of bun slices is called rich knights. This is to emphasise the difference from the poor knights made of French bread or other light bread. The name rich knights comes from the whipped cream crown. The poor knights have no whipped cream. In Norway, the dish is called arme riddere ('poor knights'). Once only a dessert dish, it is now eaten for brunch or breakfast, most commonly spiced with cinnamon and cardamom.

==== Central and East ====
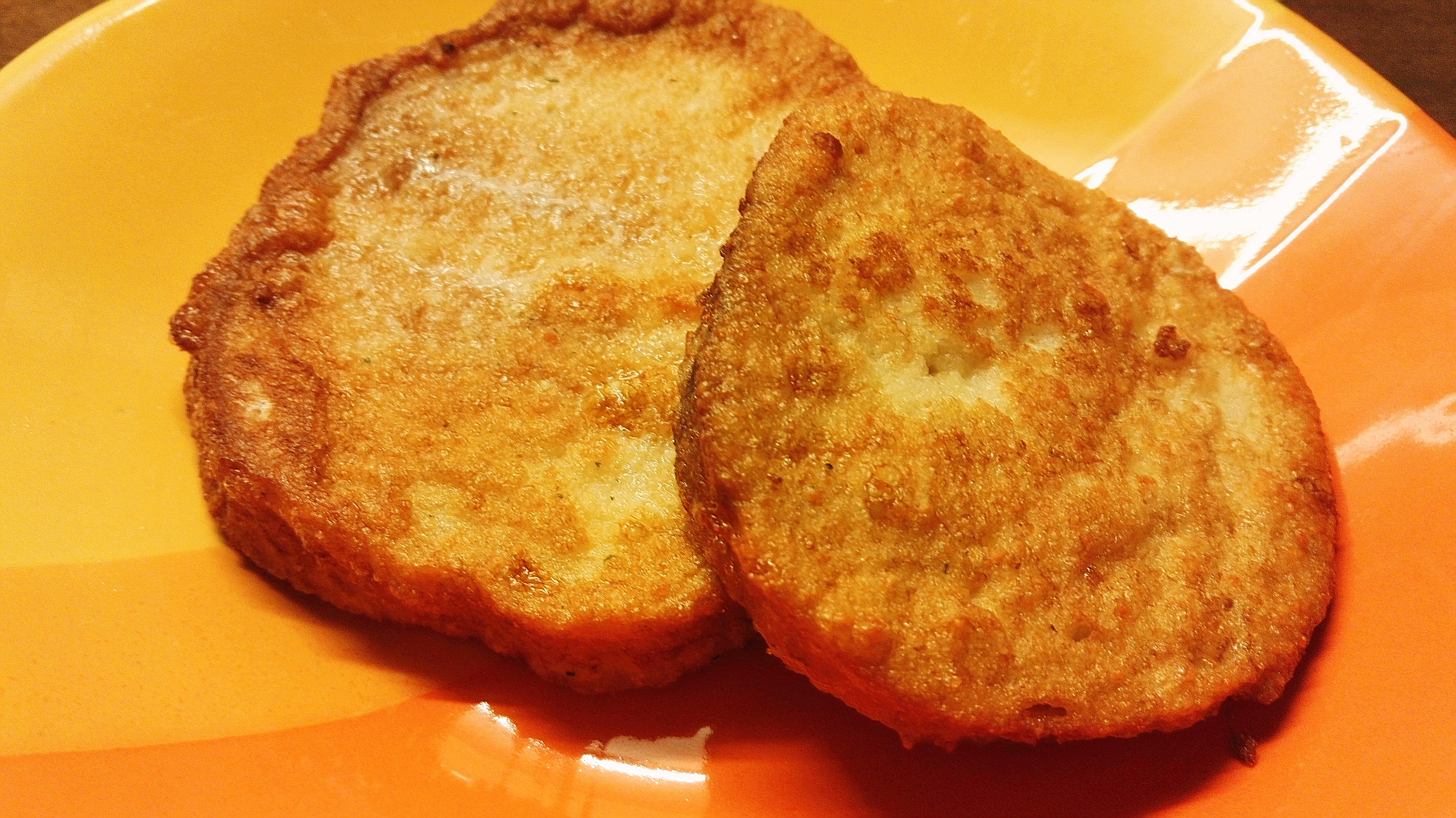
Bundás kenyér from Hungary

In Southern Slavic countries, such as Bulgaria, Bosnia and Herzegovina, Slovenia, Croatia, and Serbia, it is called prženice, pohane šnite, pohani kruh, moče, or ribanjke. It is eaten sweet or savory and paired with ajvar, jam, cheese, prosciutto, or sausage. In Romania, it is known as frigănele and almost always served as a savoury dish without milk, although milk can be requested at most dinners. In Slovakia, French toast is called chlieb vo vajci ("bread in egg") and is often prepared in a salted version. It is a popular breakfast food eaten with a cup of tea. Same goes for Poland, where it is called chleb w jajku (also "bread in egg").

In Greece, it is known as Avgofetes (Greek: Αυγόφετες) or Avgopsomo (Greek: Αυγόψωμο). This dish is a breakfast staple that involves dipping bread in a mixture used for preparing scrambled eggs and frying it. It can be enjoyed in either a savory or sweet flavour profile, with a range of toppings and accompaniments, such as feta and honey. In Hungary, French toast is called bundáskenyér ("furry bread") and is often eaten with garlic, cheese, and sausage or ham. It is a popular breakfast item, generally eaten with a cup of tea.

=== Americas ===
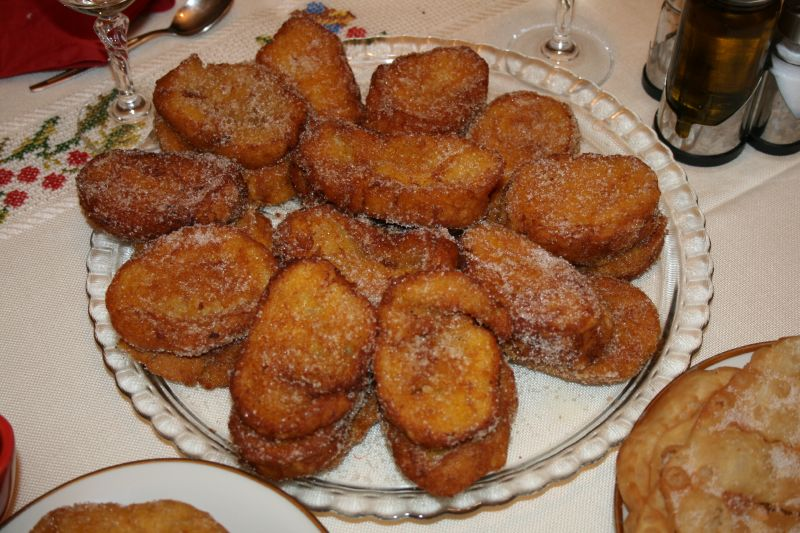
Portuguese rabanadas, traditionally served at Christmas

In both Portugal and Brazil, rabanadas are a traditional Christmas dessert. Many recipes often use Tinto or Port wine.

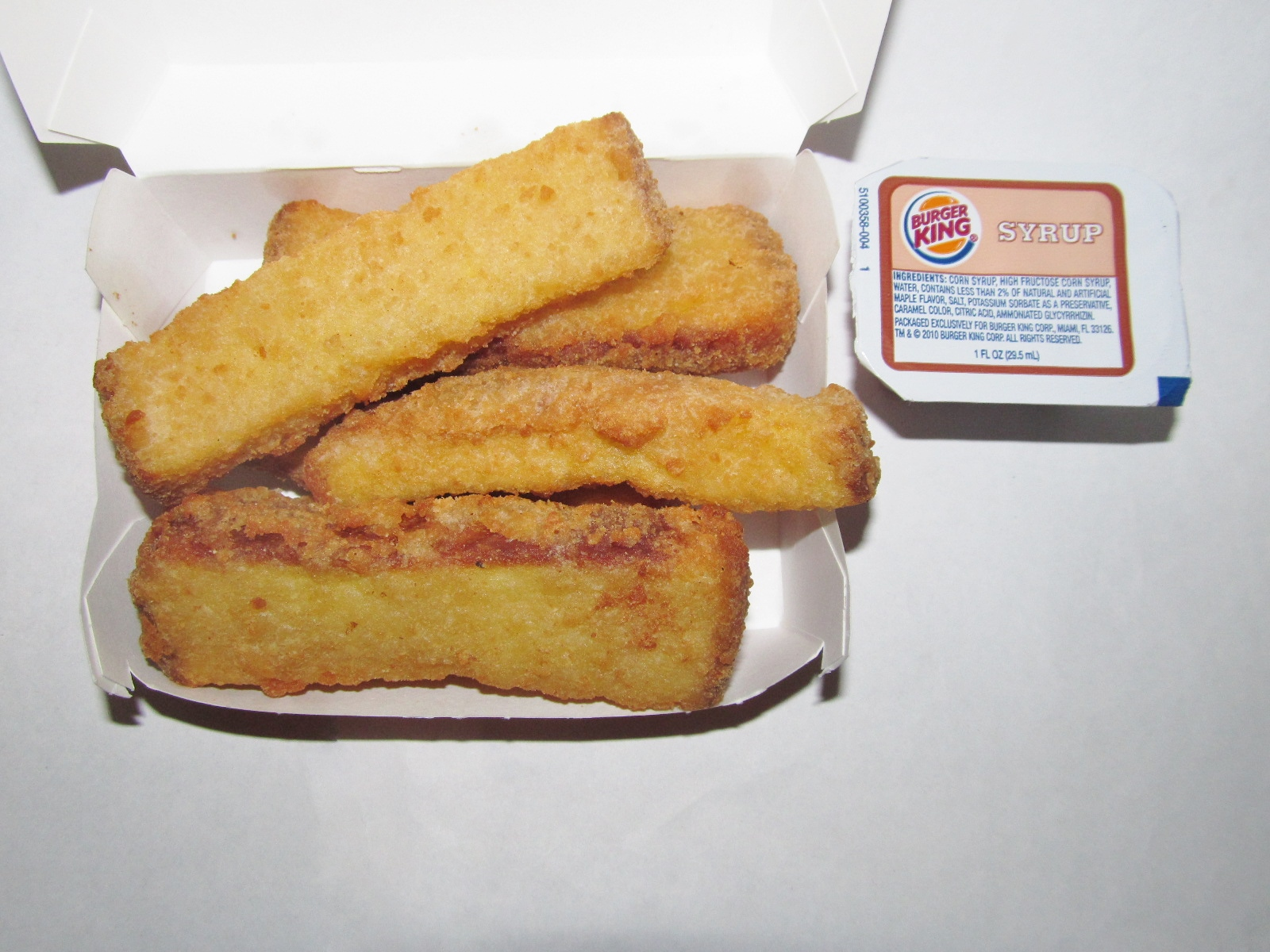
Fast food french toast sticks with syrup.

The dish is commonly eaten in the United States with butter, powdered sugar, and maple syrup. Other toppings include jam, whipped cream, and fruit. Ingredients may include challah bread. French toast was popularly served in railroad dining cars of the early and mid-20th century. The Santa Fe was especially known for its French toast, and some railroads provided recipes for these and other dining car offerings to the public as a promotional feature.

In New Orleans Louisiana Creole cuisine, French toast is known as pain perdu and is most commonly served as a breakfast dish. The recipe calls for New Orleans–style French bread; the batter is an egg-based custard that may include spirits. Common toppings include cane syrup, strongly-flavoured honey, or fruit syrups; a dusting of powdered sugar is also traditional.

== See also ==
- Egg coated bread
- Egg in the basket
- List of bread dishes
- List of breakfast foods
- List of brunch foods
- List of egg dishes
- Monte Cristo sandwich
- Milk toast
