= All Time Low (disambiguation) =

All Time Low is an American pop punk band.

All Time Low may also refer to:

- "All Time Low" (The Wanted song), a 2010 song by The Wanted
- "All Time Low" (Jon Bellion song), a 2016 song by Jon Bellion
- "All Time Low", a song by Gary Moore from the 1992 album After Hours
- "All Time Low", a song by Pet Lamb from the 1995 album Sweaty Handshake
- "All Time Low", a song by Widespread Panic from the 1999 album 'Til the Medicine Takes
- "All Time Low", a song by Less Than Jake from the 2008 album GNV FLA
- "All Time Low", a song by Nine Inch Nails from the 2013 album Hesitation Marks
- "All Time Low", a song by Bo Burnham from the 2021 special Bo Burnham: Inside
- "All Time Lows", a song by hellogoodbye from the 2006 album Zombies! Aliens! Vampires! Dinosaurs!
