= List of people known as the Bastard =

The Bastard is an epithet which may refer to:

- Anthony, bastard of Burgundy (1421–1504), half-brother of Charles the Bold
- Antonio I the Bastard, Antonio I Acciaioli (died 1435), illegitimate son of Nerio I of Athens
- Basil Lekapenos (c. 925 – c. 985), known as Basil the Parakoimomenos or Basil the Nothos (both "Basil the Bastard"), Greek illegitimate child of Romanos I Lekapenos
- Bastard of Arran, Sir James Hamilton of Finnart (1495–1540), Scottish nobleman and architect
- Bastard of Fauconberg, Thomas Neville (1429–1471), Lancastrian leader in the Wars of the Roses
- Bastard of Orleans, Jean de Dunois (1402–1468), illegitimate son of Louis d'Orléans
- The Bastard of Roussillon, illegitimate son of Catalan Nuño Sánchez
- The Bastard of Vaurus, defended the French town in the siege of Meaux in 1422
- Corneille, bastard of Burgundy (1420–1452), illegitimate son of Philip the Good
- Geoffrey, the Bastard, Geoffrey, Archbishop of York (c. 1152–1212), illegitimate son of Henry II, King of England
- Harry the Bastard, from the British 1980s television series Young Ones
- Henry the Bastard, Henry II of Castile (1334–1379), illegitimate child of King Alfonso XI of Castile
- James II (the Bastard) of Cyprus (1439–1473), illegitimate son of John II of Cyprus
- Jean de Lescun, the Bastard of Armagnac (died 1473), French ally of King Louis XI of France
- João the Bastard, John I of Portugal (1357–1433), King of Portugal and the Algarve, 1385–1433
- John the Bastard (disambiguation), several people
- Lionel, Bastard of Vendôme, captured Joan of Arc at the siege of Compiègne in 1430
- Lo Bord del rei d'Arago (literally "The Bastard of the King of Aragon"), unknown composer in Occitan
- Philip the Bastard or Philip Faulconbridge, a character in Shakespeare's play King John
- Raymond the Bastard, from an episode of the 2004 British Max and Paddy's Road to Nowhere
- Robert the Bastard, Robert, 1st Earl of Gloucester (before 1100–1147), illegitimate son of King Henry I of England
- William the Bastard, William the Conqueror, King of England (1028–1087)
- Ywain the Bastard, a Knight of the Round Table in later Arthurian legend

== See also ==
- Bastard (surname)
- "The Bastard", a character in Shakespeare's play King John
- "The Bastard", ring name for Pac (wrestler) (born Benjamin Satterley, 1986)
- Robert Bruce, Lord of Liddesdale, (died 1332), illegitimate son of King Robert I of Scotland
- Thomas of Galloway (bastard) (c. 1175–1234), illegitimate son of Alan of Galloway
