= Bastard (surname) =

Bastard is a surname. Notable people with the surname include:

- Bastard brothers John (c. 1668–1770) and William (c. 1689–1766), British surveyor-architects and civic dignitaries
- Benjamin Bastard (died 1772), British architect
- Charles Bastard (1863–1941), South Australian swimming instructor and baths lessee
- Ebbo Bastard (1910–1949), South African international rugby union player
- E. W. Bastard (1862–1901), Oxford University and Somerset cricketer
- Edmund Bastard (politician) (1758–1816), British Tory politician
- Edmund Pollexfen Bastard (1784–1838), British Tory politician
- Élisée Bastard (1871–1929), French anarchist
- Gérald Bastard (born 1950), French physicist
- John Bastard (Royal Navy officer) (c. 1787 – 1835), Royal Navy officer and politician
- John Bastard (cricketer) (1817–1848), Cambridge University and Marylebone Cricket Club cricketer
- John Pollexfen Bastard (1756–1816), British Tory politician
- Segar Bastard (1854–1921), English international footballer and referee
- Thomas Bastard (1565/6–1618), English epigrammatist
- Thomas Bastard (swimming) (died 1883), father of Charles Bastard
- Pownoll Bastard Pellew, 2nd Viscount Exmouth (1786–1833), English peer and sailor

== See also ==
- Bastardstown, County Wexford, Ireland—presumably named after a medieval landholder
