= Bastards =

Bastards or The Bastards may refer to:

== Film ==
- Bastards (2006 film), a 2006 Russian film
- The Bastards (film), 2007 Romanian film
- Bastards (2013 film), a 2013 French film by Claire Denis
- Father Figures, a 2017 American comedy film originally called Bastards

== Music ==
- Lars Frederiksen and the Bastards, a 2000s American street punk band

=== Albums ===
- Bastards (Björk album), 2012
- Bastards (Cerebral Fix album) or the title song, 1991
- Bastards (Motörhead album), 1993
- The Bastards (album), a 2020 album by Palaye Royale
- Bastards (Saigon Kick album), 1999

=== Songs ===
- "Bastards", by the Bloody Hawaiians from The Threegos, 1994
- "Bastards", by Defeater from Letters Home, 2013
- "Bastards", by the Golden Dogs from Everything in 3 Parts, 2004
- "Bastards", by Kesha from Rainbow, 2017
- "Bastards", by Machine Head from Catharsis, 2018
- "Bastards", by the Real McKenzies from Clash of the Tartans, 1998
- "Bastards", by Shut Up and Dance, mixed by Nicolette, from DJ-Kicks: Nicolette, 1997

== Other uses ==
- Bastard brothers, 18th century British surveyor-architects and civic dignitaries

== See also ==
- Bastard (disambiguation)
- ¡Bastardos!, the eighth studio album by rock band Blues Traveler, 2005
