= Pump House, Blandford Forum =

The Pump House, Blandford Forum
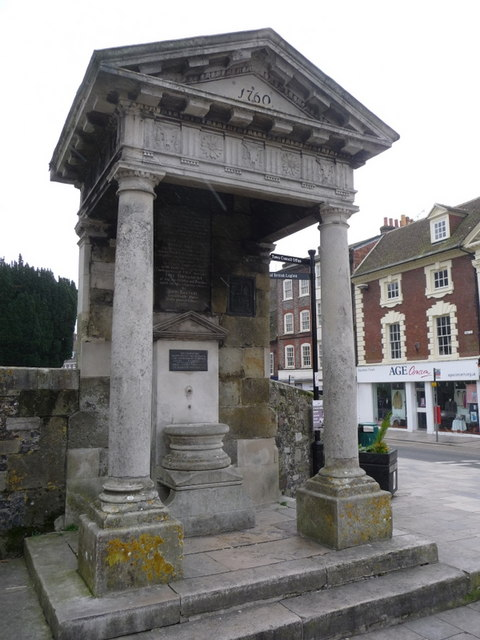
- "'In REMEMBRANCE of God's dreadful Visitation by FIRE which broke out the 4th June 1731, and in few Hours reduced almost this whole Town to Ashes"

- Location within Dorset
- 50.8561°N 2.1642°W
- Type: Fountain
- Location: Blandford Forum, Dorset

History
- Built: 1760

Site notes
- Architect: John Bastard
- Architectural style: Neoclassical

Listed Building – Grade I
- Official name: Pump House
- Designated: 27 October 1950
- Reference no.: 1324829

The Pump House, Blandford Forum, Dorset, England, is an 18th-century water source erected in 1760 in commemoration of a fire which almost destroyed the town in 1731. It was designed and paid for by John Bastard who, with his brother William, worked as builders and architects and were largely responsible for the town's reconstruction. The Pump House is a Grade I listed structure.

== History ==
On 4 June 171, a fire destroyed almost the entirety of the town of Blandford Forum. Around 15 people were killed and over 90% of the town's buildings razed. Rebuilding of the town was led by the Bastard brothers, John and William, who worked as builders and architects in the town. John Bastard designed and paid for the monument which was erected in 1760. (Note: The cost of the monument was £66 and 5 pence.) It was sited above a spring, to provide a water source in the event of a further fire. This was converted to a drinking fountain in 1899.

== Description ==
The Pump House is constructed of Portland stone. Historic England describe the design as in the Bastards' "later and more severely classical style". Nikolaus Pevsner, in his Dorset volume of the Buildings of England series, considered it a "detailed tabernacle with Doric columns". It contains a number of inscriptions, the main one reading [see box];

In REMEMBRANCE of God's dreadful Visitation by FIRE which broke out the 4th June 1731, and in few Hours reduced, not only the CHURCH, and almost this whole Town to Ashes wherein 14 Inhabitants perished, but also, two adjacent Villages. And, In grateful Acknowledgement of the DIVINE MERCY, that has raised this Town, like the PHAENIX from it's Ashes, to it's present beautiful and flourishing State, And to prevent by a timely Supply of Water, (with God's Blessing) the fatal Consequences of FIRE hereafter THIS MONUMENT of that dire Disaster and Provision against the like, is humbly erected by JOHN BASTARD, a considerable Sharer in the general Calamity. 1760

— Memorial inscription

The Pump House is a Grade I listed building.

== Gallery ==
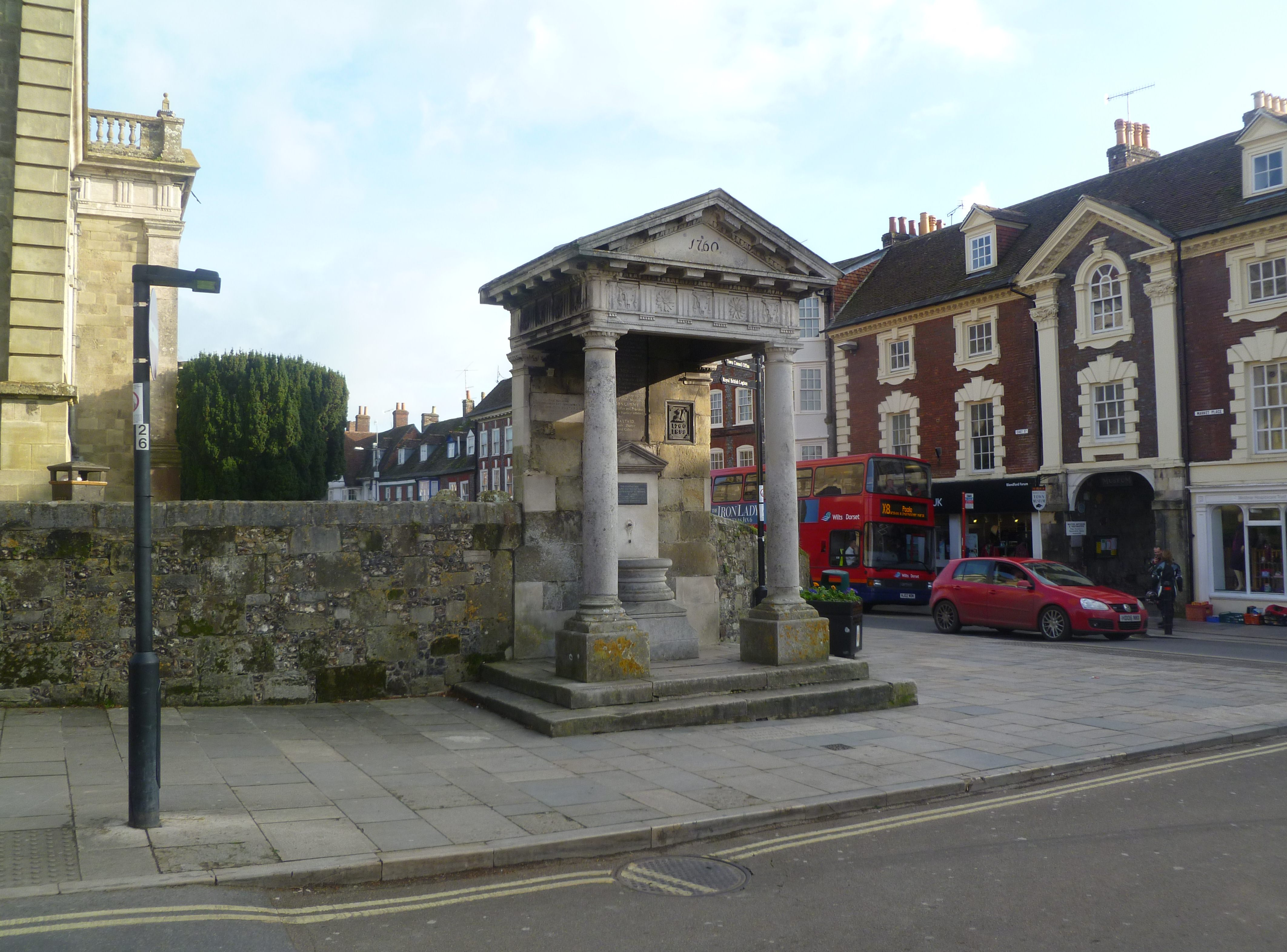
The Pump House in its urban setting

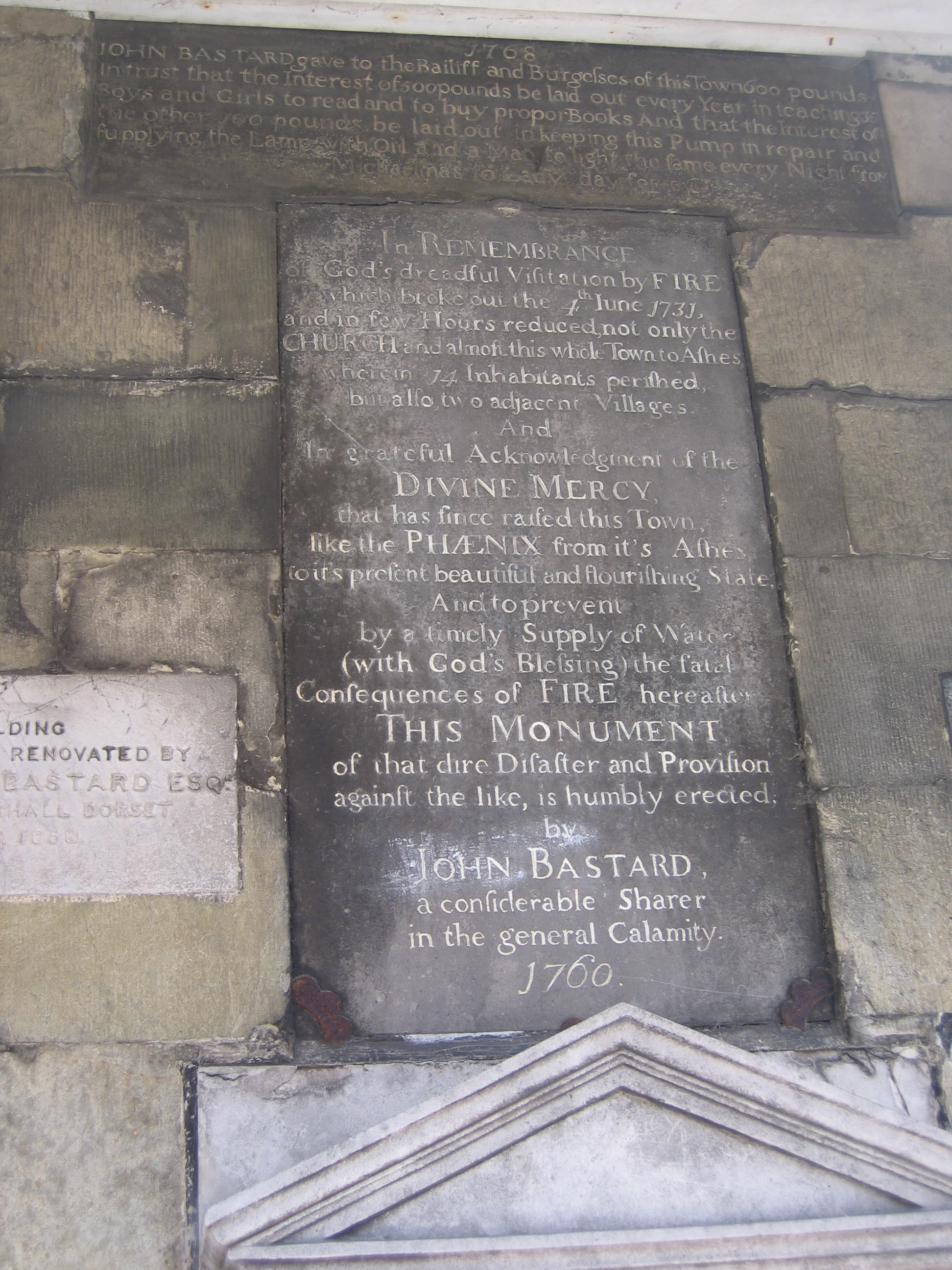
The main inscription

== Sources ==
- Pevsner, Nikolaus; Newman, John (1972). Dorset. The Buildings of England. Harmondsworth, Middlesex: Penguin Books. ISBN 978-0-140-71044-1. OCLC 1243791335.
- Cox, Benjamin G. (1993). The Great Fire of Blandford Forum 1731. Blandford Forum: Blandford Museum.
