= Sherborne House, Dorset =

Sherborne House
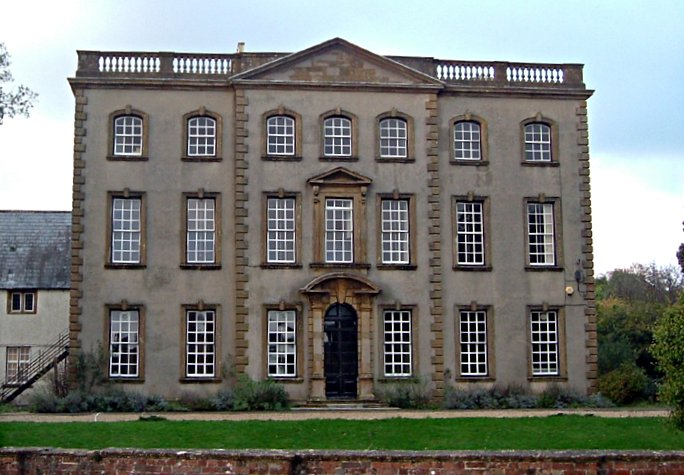
- Sherborne House

General information
- Classification: Grade I listed building
- Location: Newland, Sherborne, Dorset, England
- Coordinates: 50.9506°N 2.5151°W
- Year(s) built: c.1720
- Owner: Sherborne House Trust

Technical details
- Material: Stone rubble and brick
- Floor count: 3

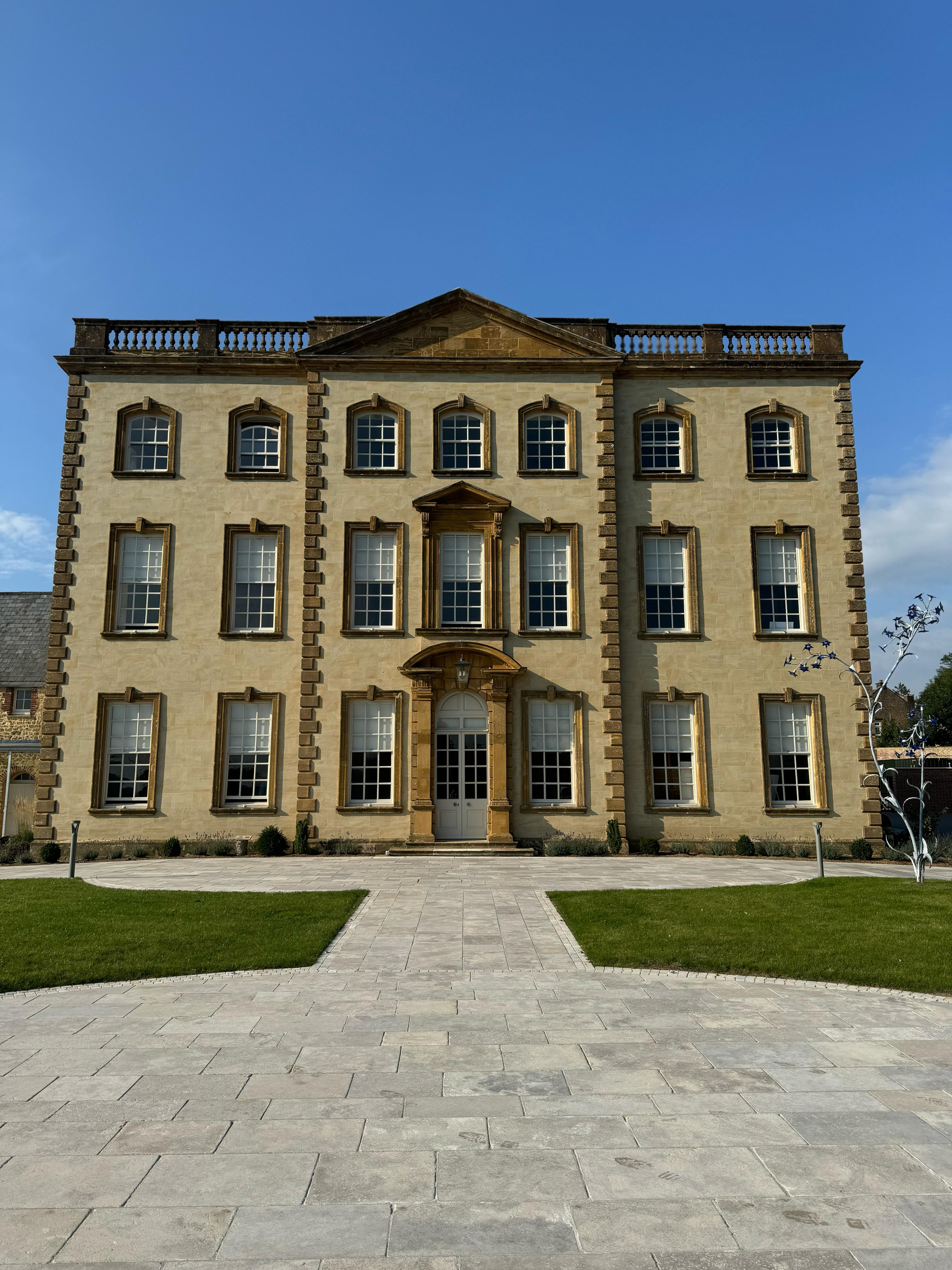
The newly restored frontage of Sherborne House, 2025

Sherborne House is a Grade I listed building in Newland, Sherborne, Dorset, England.

== History ==
Sherborne House was built c.1720 for Henry Seymour Portman as a halfway house between his properties in Somerset (Orchard Portman) and Dorset (Bryanston). John Hutchins in his 'History of Dorset' reported that the house was designed by 'Mr Bastard of Sherborne' (Benjamin Bastard), but given the date of its building, it was more likely that the Bastard company of Blandford Forum only provided the internal joinery. Michael Hill in the Dorset edition of The Buildings of England suggests that Sir James Thornhill may have been the architect. The House, which incorporates an earlier 16th century north wing, is three storeys high and seven bays wide and rendered in stone rubble and brick with a slate roof. The staircase features a mural painted a year or two after the completion of the house by Sir James Thornhill, which depicts the Greek mythological characters Meleager, Atalanta and the hunt for the Calydonian Boar.

Following the death in 1728 of Henry Seymour Portman, Sherborne House was purchased by Francis Seymour, MP, and from 1799 it was owned by the Toogood family. On 25 July 1816, Sherborne House was purchased by Edward Digby, 2nd Earl Digby for £2,000. From 1824 until 1849, the house was occupied under lease by the banker Samuel Pretor. In 1850, the house was leased by the recently retired actor manager William Charles Macready, whose friend the Plymouth architect George Wightwick adapted the house for the family. In 1854, Macready's friend Charles Dickens visited Sherborne and gave a reading from A Christmas Carol in aid of the Sherborne Literary and Scientific Institution, of which Macready was president. Macready left Sherborne in 1861 and the lease of Sherborne House was taken over by Robert Willmott, a silk throwster. Subsequent tenants were Major Andrew Cathcart Bogle VC of the 23rd Foot, General Sir Julius Richard Glyn KCB, Colonel Grant, Major D.S. Browne, and Colonel C. Kindersley Porcher.

At the suggestion of school governor Littleton Charles Powys, in 1930 the Education Committee of Dorset County Council approved Lord Digby's School for Girls taking over the lease of Sherborne House. Lord Digby's School moved in to Sherborne House on 9 November 1931 and the School was formally opened on 18 February 1932 by Miss Lynda Grier, principal of Lady Margaret Hall, Oxford. In 1962, a film for HTV was made of John Betjeman's visit to Sherborne and Lord Digby's School, entitled 'John Betjeman in the West County'. Lord Digby's School moved out of Sherborne House in 1992.

== Recent events ==
In 2004, Sherborne House featured in the second series of the BBC TV series Restoration. The council was also unsuccessful in obtaining a £3 million National Lottery grant that would have helped to repair the roof. By June 2006, Sherborne House was shrouded in scaffolding and the Thornhill-designed mural was beginning to show signs of water damage. Sherborne House was put up for sale the following year.

In 2011, plans were announced to turn Sherborne House into a tourist attraction with an arts centre and restaurant.

In 2012, International Fine Art Conservation Studios carried out restoration work on the Thornhill mural, which featured in the BBC TV series Restoring England’s Heritage (2013).

In 2018, Sherborne House was purchased under the Sherborne House Trust, with the aim of 'restoring, preserving and maintaining Sherborne House, Sherborne, Dorset, including the Thornhill Mural, promoting and advancing the education of the public in the arts, including (a) promoting and providing facilities for participation in the arts, and (b) fostering and promoting the improvement and development of artistic knowledge, understanding and appreciation of the arts'.

In May 2024, after a meticulous restoration programme, Sherborne House opened its doors as The Sherborne; home to the nationally significant Thornhill Mural (painted by Sir James Thornhill, the renowned artist behind the dome at St Paul’s Cathedral), and a landmark new destination for the arts. Beyond the canvas and sculptures, it offers versatile spaces for events, private hire, and flexible working, a restaurant and bar championing a locally sourced British menu, and a carefully curated shop showcasing artisanal creators and makers.

Freely open to all, The Sherborne ensures accessibility and inclusivity for all ages and backgrounds as an integral part of the local community.The Sherborne House Trust is an independent charitable trust (1179440). It relies on a dedicated team of volunteers, and all proceeds from the generous support of individuals, membership, hospitality, retail, and events support the arts programme and continued preservation of the historic house, gardens and Thornhill Mural.
