= Egg-coated bread =

Fried food

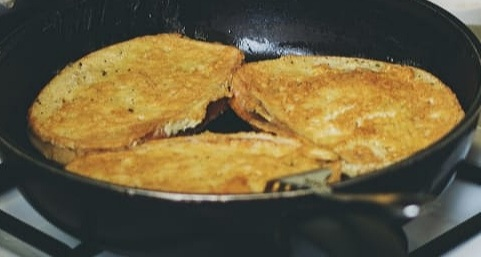
Egg-coated bread in frying pan

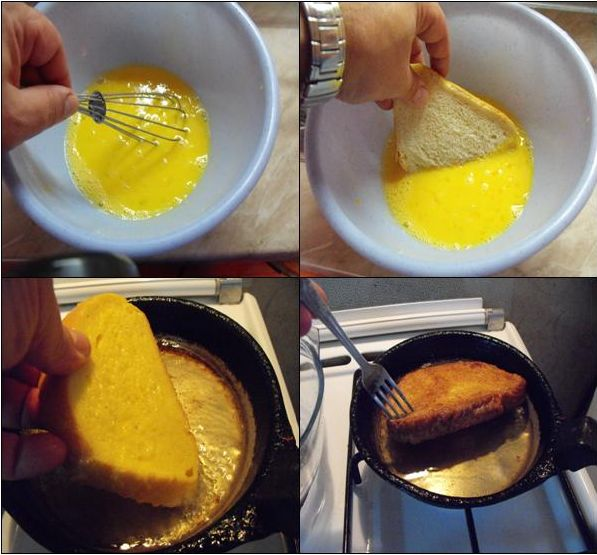
Egg-coated bread recipe

Egg-coated bread, bread in egg, eggy bread or French toast (Slovak: chlieb vo vajíčku or chlieb vo vajci, Czech: chléb s vejcem; dialectally chleba vo vajci or bundáš, Poland: jajochlebki) is a salty version of French toast. It is a simple breakfast or supper fried salty dish popular in the Czech Republic and Slovakia.

== See also ==
- French toast
