= Pet Lamb =

Irish band

- Origin: Dublin, Ireland
- Years active: 1991–2000
- Labels: Blunt, Roadrunner
- Past members: Brian Mooney; Dylan Philips; Kevin Talbot; James Lillis; David Lacey
- Website: www.facebook.com/PetLamb/

Pet Lamb were a Dublin-based rock band formed in 1991. They released two albums before splitting in 2000.

== History ==
The band's initial line-up was Brian Mooney (vocals, guitar), Dylan Philips (vocals, guitar), Kevin Talbot (bass guitar), and James Lillis (drums). Irish independent record label Blunt Records released two EP's, Paranoid From The Neck Down (1993) and Spent (1994). Influenced by The Jesus Lizard and Butthole Surfers, they played support slots for Therapy?, Nomeansno, Babes In Toyland.

In February 1994 they recorded their first Peel session for BBC Radio. This brought interest from Roadrunner Records, who signed them, releasing the single "Black Mask" in late 1994, before combining the tracks from the Blunt EPs for the Sweaty Handshake LP. The album, released in January 1995, got a 9/12 rating from Hot Press.

They released the single "Where Did Your Plans Go?" in April 1995, described by Melody Maker as "noisy nonsense". In July they recorded their second Peel session. In November that year they recorded their first studio album for Roadrunner with producer Martin Bisi in New York City, called High Anxiety. Although artwork for the album, and for its lead single, "Holes", was drafted, neither were ultimately released as the band were dropped by the label in mid 1996.

In 1996 drummer James Lillis left the band and was replaced by multi instrumentalist David Lacey. In summer 1997 they recorded their final album Tenderness, released on Blunt Records in April 1998.

The band split up in 2000.

The lost album High Anxiety was released on Spotify in 2014.

== Members ==
- Brian Mooney – vocals, guitar (1991–2000)
- Dylan Philips – vocals, guitar (1991–2000)
- Kevin Talbot – bass guitar (1991–2000)
- James Lillis – drums (1991–1996)
- Dave Lacey – drums, vocals (1996–2000)

== Discography ==
=== Studio albums ===
- High Anxiety (2014), Spotify (recorded in 1995)
- Tenderness (1998), Blunt

=== Compilations ===
- Sweaty Handshake (1995), Roadrunner

=== EPs ===
- Paranoid From The Neck Down (1993), Blunt
- Spent (1994), Blunt

=== Singles ===
- "Black Mask" (1994), Roadrunner
- "Where Did Your Plans Go?" (1995), Roadrunner

=== Compilation appearances ===
- "Son of John Doe" : Volume Twelve (1994) CD & LP
- "Don't Phase Me" : Zip Up Your Boots for the Showbands (1996) CD
- "Baby, I Love You" : Hot Shots (1998) CD given away with Hot Press magazine
- "Song About Salt" : Three Degrees of Separation (1998) CD given away with Hot Press magazine
- "Six String Goal (remixed by Decal)" : There's Gonna Be Some Rockin' (1999) Cassette given away at AC/DC tribute night at The Funnel, Dublin, on 17 March 1999
- "Walk All Over You (live)" : It Was One of Those Nights... (1999) Cdr recorded live at The Funnel, Dublin, on 17 March 1999
