= Bastardo =

Bastardo is a proper noun for at least two referents, each of them probably cognate with the common noun bastardo, meaning bastard in several Romance languages. It may also refer to:

== Entertainment ==
- Bastardo (film), a 2013 Tunisian film
- "Bastardo", a single released by Charlotte Hatherley
- ¡Bastardos!, an album by Blues Traveler

== Places ==
- Bastardo (Giano dell'Umbria), an Italian town in Perugia province, Umbria
- Fonte do Bastardo, a Portuguese parish of Praia da Vitória, Azores

== Surname ==
- Angel Bastardo (born 2002), Venezuelan professional baseball player
- Antonio Bastardo (born 1985), Dominican baseball player
- José Luis Salcedo Bastardo (1926–2005), Venezuelan historian and diplomat
- Marlon Bastardo (born 1990), Venezuelan footballer

== Other ==
- Bastardo (grape), a Portuguese variety of red grape
- Bastardo, a variant of the burpee (exercise) which adds a pushup
