= Benjamin Bastard =

British architect

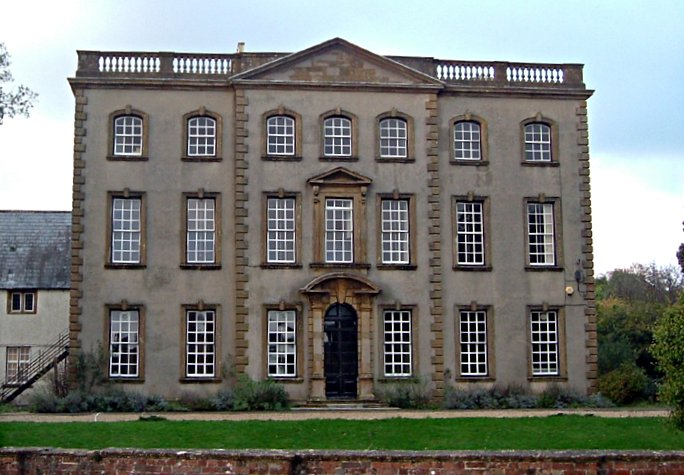
Sherborne House, designed by Benjamin Bastard c. 1720

Benjamin Bastard was a British architect during the first half of the 18th century working in the Dorset area of England. A member of a notable family of west country architect-surveyors and masons, he was related to the Bastard brothers who rebuilt Blandford Forum following its great fire of 1731.

Bastard was responsible for the Palladian Sherborne House, at Sherborne in Dorset built in the 1720s. The accomplished design of this mansion like the works of the Bastard brothers shows late Baroque influences such as those found in the works of Wren and Hawksmoor. In style and design it could be compared to Winslow Hall attributed to Sir Christopher Wren or Chicheley Hall like Winslow Hall also in Buckinghamshire. Sherborne House has a three bayed centre projecting from two symmetrical flanking wings each of two bays. The tall slim windows are typical of the English Baroque period which immediately predated the Palladian period. The Baroque style is further emphasised by the broken segmental pediment and architrave of the main entrance. However, the facade, with its central pediment and the balustrade concealing the roof line are devoid of ornament in the Palladian tradition. The only relief from the severity of the facade coming from the quoining at each corner.

In 1743 Bastard was commissioned to design a hospital for the reception of the poor, later known as the Dorchester parish workhouse. This building has been much altered but the original block can still be discerned as Palladian, albeit in a very severe and chaste form as would have been thought fitting for such an institution at the time.

There is a wall monument with a pediment to Benjamin and Thomas Bastard, dated 1772, on the external face of the north wall of the parish church of St Mary Magdalene, Castleton, Sherborne in Dorset. The inscription has weathered away. Inside the nave, on the north wall of the north aisle is a monument to Elizabeth Bastard (née Prankerd), wife of Benjamin Bastard, 1732–3, and their son Benjamin. This is a marble wall monument with side-scrolls, pediment, urn and cherub's head.
