= Bastardstown =

Townland in County Wexford, Ireland

Bastardstown Baile Bhastaird
- Townland
- Interactive map of Bastardstown
- Location in Ireland
- Coordinates: 52°11′21″N 6°32′34″W
- Country: Ireland
- Province: Leinster
- County: County Wexford
- Civil parish: Kilmore

Area
  - Total: 0.7491 km^{2} (0.2892 sq mi)
- Time zone: UTC+0 (WET)
  - Summer (DST): UTC-1 (IST (WEST))

Bastardstown (Irish: Baile Bhastaird) is a townland and neighbourhood in the civil parish of Kilmore, County Wexford, Ireland. Bastardstown townland had a population of 36 people as of the 2011 census. The place is often noted for its vulgar name, and several news outlets consider it to be one of Ireland's most vulgar place names.

The name Bastardstown dates back to the 1530s, originating from residents Richard Caine and William Seyntloo. "Bastard" was probably a nickname for the land's owner. Like the rest of the barony of Bargy, it was invaded in the Anglo-Norman invasion of Ireland and heavily settled by Anglo- and Cambro-Norman colonists. In 2008, journalist Tom Galvin visited the townland for his column in the Evening Herald. He thought the only reason to go there is to say that you did.

== Name ==
The name "Bastardstown" for the place is first recorded in the 1530s, in records of the Dublin Castle administration relating to residents named Richard Caine and William Seyntloo. (Note: The original documents were destroyed in the Four Courts explosion but had been calendared in the 19th century.) "Bastard" was probably the nickname of someone who owned the land after the Norman invasion of Ireland led the barony of Bargy, in which Bastardstown is located, to be heavily settled by Anglo- and Cambro-Norman colonists. Many Bargy townlands bear the surname of medieval proprietors. A bastard was a person of illegitimate birth and the surname Bastard developed in medieval times from several founders' personal nicknames. The Irish name is a direct translation of the English—Baile Bhastaird, "town[land] of [person named] Bastard". (Note: The Irish for "bastard" in sense "illegitimate person" is not Bastard but rather [leanbh] tabhartha or [páiste] suirí.)

The word bastard in later centuries became a vulgar general term of abuse. The place is often noted for its vulgar name. The Irish Mirror, BelfastLive, Irish Star, TheJournal.ie, Irish Parcels and DublinLive consider Bastardstown to be one of Ireland's most vulgar place names, with Irish Parcels making a road trip map of Ireland's most obscene place names with Bastardstown included, and BelfastLive and Irish Mirror putting Bastardstown on the top of their most obscene Irish place names lists.

== Demographics and tourism ==
In 2008, journalist Tom Galvin visited the townland for his column in the Evening Herald. He wrote that "the only purpose of a visit to Bastardstown is to say you were there". The only confirmation that he was in the townland was a notice on a wall of an application for planning permission. (Note: Townlands are minor units whose names and boundaries are rarely marked on public signage, but often form part of a property's postal address.)

Population of Bastardstown at censuses
Year	1841	1851	1861	1871	1881	1891	1901	1911	1926	(Note: Data for some censuses was never published at townland level.)	2011	2016
Population	179	164	130	121	115	84	76	75	63	—N/a	36	42
References												

== Bastardstown Beach ==
The townland is coastal and has a beach named Bastardstown Beach or Seaview.

Artist Orla Barry exhibited a set of 1997–1999 photographs of Bastardstown Beach under the title "Findlings". This evokes Findling, a German word which can mean either a glacial erratic, such as are found on the beach, or a foundling, a type of abandoned child recalling the "bastard" of the beach's name.

Like many other beaches in County Wexford, Bastardstown Beach is heavily affected by coastal erosion, with The Irish Times writer Ronan McGreevy considering it to have the worst coastal erosion in County Wexford. In June 2024, the Irish Government gave €668,921 to Wexford County Council to add another layer of large boulders to protect the road and houses near the coast.

== See also ==
- Place names considered unusual
