= Bastardisation =

Bastardisation or bastardization may refer to:

- Corruption (linguistics), the idea that language change constitutes a degradation in the quality
- Hazing, activities involving harassment, abuse or humiliation used as a way of initiating a person into a group
- Hybridisation (biology), mixing two animals or plants of different breeds, varieties, species or genera

== See also ==
- Bastard (disambiguation)
