= John the Bastard =

John the Bastard may refer to:

- John the Bastard (film), 1967 Italian spaghetti Western
- John I Doukas of Thessaly (c. 1240–1289), ruler of Thessaly in c. 1268–1289
- John I of Portugal (1357–1433), king of Portugal in 1385–1433
