= Gérald Bastard =

French physicist

- Scientific career
- Thesis: Observation des effets de non-centrosymétrie et des niveaux accepteurs dans Hg Te par l'étude de la magnéto-absorption (1974)

Gérald Bastard (born 3 April 1950 in Paris) is a highly cited French physicist known for his work on semiconductor heterostructures. As of 2011, he is a research director at the Department of Physics of the École Normale Supérieure in Paris.

== Education ==
Bastard completed his Ph.D. in 1974 at Université Paris Diderot, titled Observation des effets de non-centrosymétrie et des niveaux accepteurs dans Hg Te par l'étude de la magnéto-absorption.

== Awards ==
In 2000, Bastard and Emilio E. Mendez won the International Symposium on Compound Semiconductors Quantum Device Award "for pioneering work on electric-field induced optic effects in quantum wells and superlattices (quantum-confined Stark effect and Wannier–Stark localization)".

== Books ==
- Bastard, Gerald (1991). Wave Mechanics Applied to Semiconductor Heterostructures. Wiley-Interscience. ISBN 978-0-470-21708-5.
