= Sweaty Handshake =

Compilation album by Pet Lamb
- Released: 27 January 1995
- Recorded: November 1992 (tracks 1,2,4,5,11), September 1993 (tracks 6,7,9,10, 12), 1994 (tracks 3,8), at Sonic Studios, Dublin, Ireland
- Genre: Rock
- Label: Roadrunner
- Producer: Albert Cowan

Pet Lamb chronology
Spent (1994)	Sweaty Handshake (1995)	High Anxiety (1996)

Sweaty Handshake was the debut compilation album by Irish rock band Pet Lamb. It was released 27 January 1995 through Roadrunner Records.

It is a compilation of two EPs released through Dublin based indie label Blunt Records – Paranoid from the Neck Down released 1 March 1993, and Spent released 5 January 1994. Two additional tracks recorded in 1994, 'All Time Low' and 'I Got Played', as well as additional instrumental segues at the end of tracks 6 and 12, are only available on this release.

'Drop It' from the Paranoid from the Neck Down EP, and all tracks from the Spent EP, were remixed for this album. The spoken sample at the end of 'Never Rest Again' fades out on this release.

The album was released on LP, CD and Cassette. Initial copies of the LP included a 7" featuring 'The Cleaver' and 'Bangkok', an Alex Chilton cover.

== Track listing ==
1. "Never Rest Again"
2. "Asshole Agony Aunt"
3. "All Time Low"
4. "Little Meaner"
5. "Where Did Your Plan Go"
6. "Black Mask"
7. "Insult to Injury"
8. "I Got Played"
9. "Fun with Maggots"
10. "Suck the Grain"
11. "Drop It"
12. "The Bastard"

== Paranoid from the Neck Down EP ==
1. "Little Meaner"
2. "Where Did Your Plans Go"
3. "Asshole Agony Aunt"
4. "Never Rest Again"
5. "Drop It"

== Spent EP ==
1. "Insult to Injury"
2. "Fun with Maggots"
3. "Suck the Grain"
4. "Black Mask"
5. "The Bastard"

== Singles ==
- "Black Mask" was released November 1994 on CD and 10", with "Get Your Socks Off" and "Cinders".
- "Where Did Your Plans Go" was released 18 April 1995 on CD and 10", with "Bully Lover" and "Mutt Stamina".

== Personnel ==
- Brian Mooney – Vocals, Guitar
- Dylan Philips – Vocals, Guitar
- Kevin Talbot – Bass Guitar
- James Lillis – Drums
