= John Bastard (cricketer) =

English cricketer and clergyman

John Horatio (Horace) Bastard (16 December 1817 – July 1848) was a Cambridge University cricketer who played in six first-class matches between 1838 and 1840. He was born and died in Newcastle upon Tyne.

He was educated at Winchester College and Trinity College, Cambridge. As well as playing for Cambridge, he also played two first-class games for the Marylebone Cricket Club against Oxford University and against his alma mater. Bastard never scored highly, making 0, 11, 0, 5, 9, 11, 0, 0* and 5 in his first-class innings. Although the bowling records of the matches in which he played are not complete, he is not recorded to have bowled at first-class level, and certainly did not take a wicket. He did, however, hold three catches.

In later life, Bastard became a clergyman, serving as a Navy Chaplain.
