= Bastard brothers =

British surveyor-architects

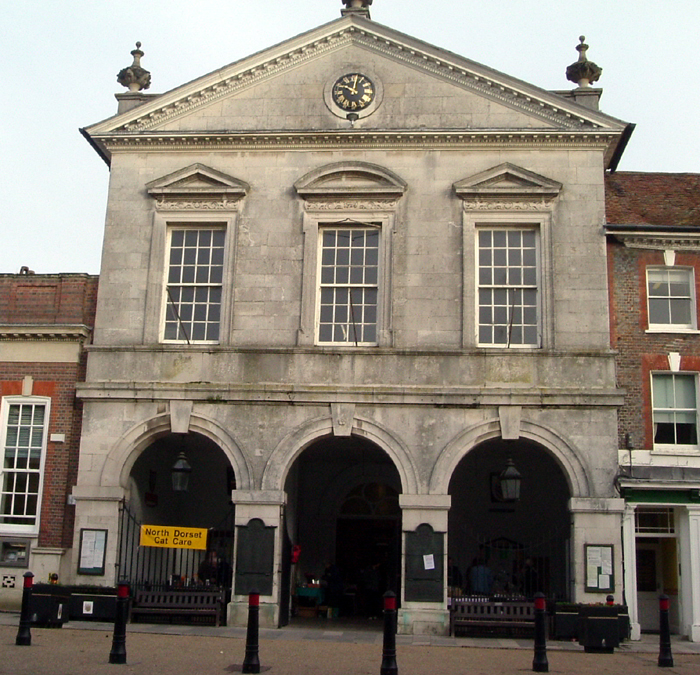
The Town Hall, Blandford Forum

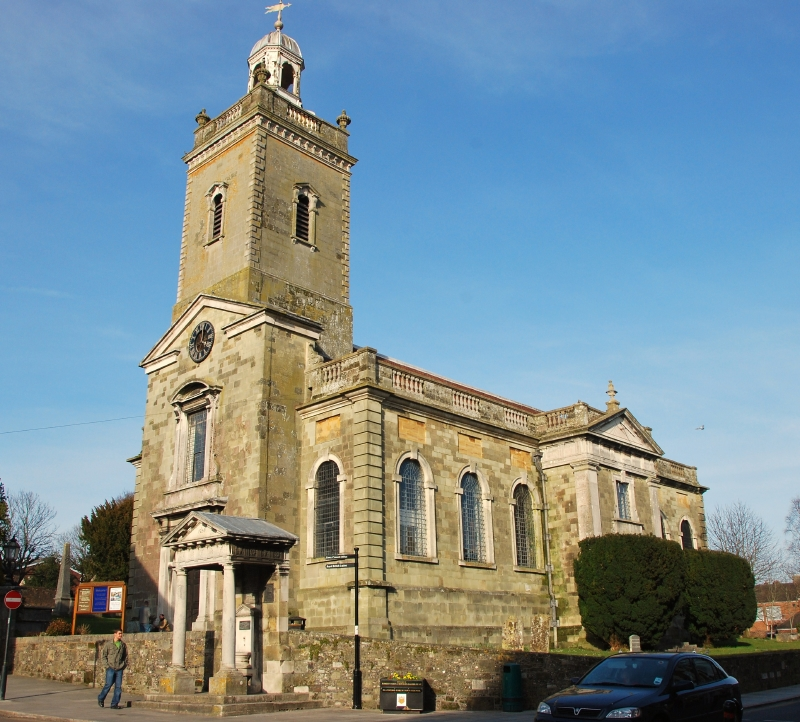
Blandford Forum, Church of St. Peter and St. Paul

John (ca 1688–1770) and William Bastard (ca 1689–1766) were British surveyor-architects, and civic dignitaries of the town of Blandford Forum in Dorset. John and William generally worked together and are known as the "Bastard brothers". They were builders, furniture makers, ecclesiastical carvers and experts at plasterwork, but are most notable for their rebuilding work at Blandford Forum following a large fire of 1731, and for work in the neighbourhood that Colvin describes as "mostly designed in a vernacular baroque style of considerable merit though of no great sophistication.". Their work was chiefly inspired by the buildings of Wren, Archer and Gibbs. Thus the Bastards' architecture was retrospective and did not follow the ideals of the more austere Palladianism which by the 1730s was highly popular in England.

The brothers, the sons of Thomas Bastard (died 1720), a joiner and architect, the founder of a family firm of provincial architects in the area. However little remains today of the works of the brothers' ancestors, chiefly as the result of the 1731 fire and a previous fire in the town in 1713.

== Rebuilding of Blandford ==
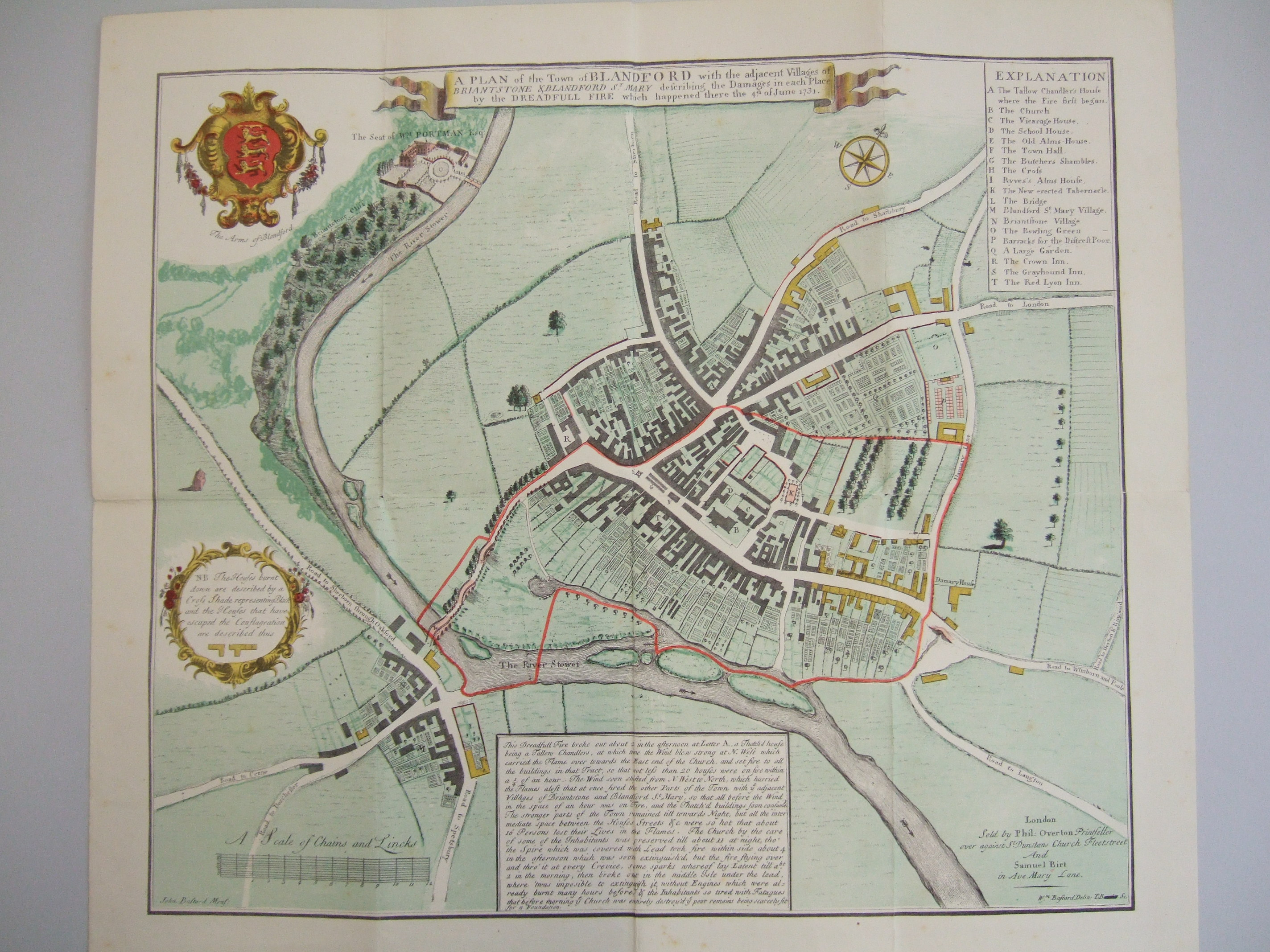
Plan showing the devastation of the fire of 1731. The areas shaded black are destroyed houses; those that survived are shaded yellow

A fire on 4 June 1731 destroyed the greater part of Blandford. John Bastard worked as a fire assessor before and after this fire, and a book survives in Dorset History Centre in which he detailed assessments from fires at Sturminster Newton Castle (1730), Affpuddle (1741), Beaminster (1741), Puddletown (1753) and Wareham (1762). The inventory for the fire at Blandford shows the losses of everyone in the town including the Corporation of the Borough of Blandford and the church. Bastard and Co. were the largest private losers.

The Blandford fire, which swept away the heart of a town that had evolved in a haphazard way from the medieval period, presented an opportunity for more regular redevelopment in the classical styles. However, with the exception of a widening the original market square, the fashionable Baroque style of town planning was ignored and the town was rebuilt on its former medieval street plan.

=== Town Hall ===
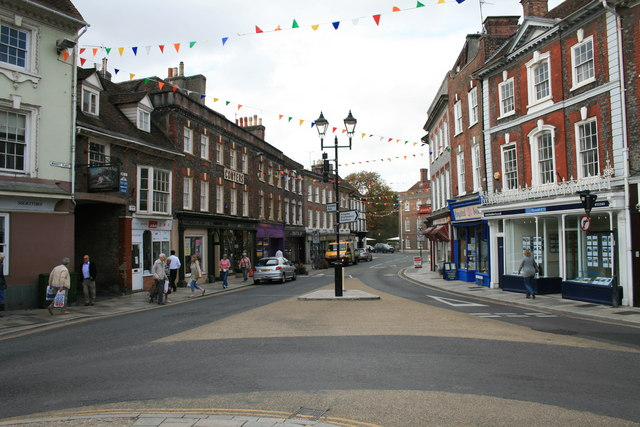
West Street, Blandford Forum

The first building to be completed in Blandford was the grandiose Blandford Forum Town Hall, finished in 1734. Constructed, like much of their work, in the local Portland stone, the building is architecturally of interest because of its idiosyncrasies of style. While at first glance appearing to be a typical example of the Palladian style popular at the time, this is not truly the case. The ground floor is an open arcade of three segmented arches more typical of Renaissance Dutch and English market halls. The upper floor however, is in the highest Palladian tradition, as exemplified by Inigo Jones in his Banqueting House at Whitehall, the windows alternating with segmental and pointed pediments. The whole of the facade is surmounted by a uniting pediment, with a circular window at its centre. The design of the facade seems incomplete, as though flanking wings are missing. The provincial design of the building is again emphasised by the placement of three covered urns on the pediment redolent of the Baroque style which by the 1730s had already passed from its brief period of high fashion in England. The pediment appears heavy and lacks support from the pilasters which more urbane architects would have placed at either end of the facade.

The Town Hall, designed to provide a central feature to a row of houses, is typical of the work of the Bastard brothers, from which they were to make their fortune. They became entrepreneurs and local politicians. Other works by the Bastards in the town include the Church of St. Peter and St. Paul, built between 1733 and 1739; the market place around the town hall, designed in the classical style but not uniform; the Greyhound Inn (1734–35; now a bank), which was their own property; a terrace of almshouses; and many large private houses with classical facades, notably Spetisbury and Coupar House.

=== Church of St Peter and St Paul ===
The parish church of St Peter and St Paul was built between 1732 and 1739 and is a classical building with a cupola on top of the tower. Outside of London, it is one of the few Georgian churches in the country. The design by John Bastard originally specified that the tower would have a steeple, but lack of money resulted in the wooden cupola instead, a decision that disgusted Bastard, who stated that "it will not keep the wett nor the weather out". Sir Frederick Treves was not a fan of the church's appearance, describing it in his 1906 Highways & Byways in Dorset as "ugly, and only tolerable from a distance". The interior remains relatively unaffected by Victorian interference and retains its font, pulpit, box pews and mayoral seat.

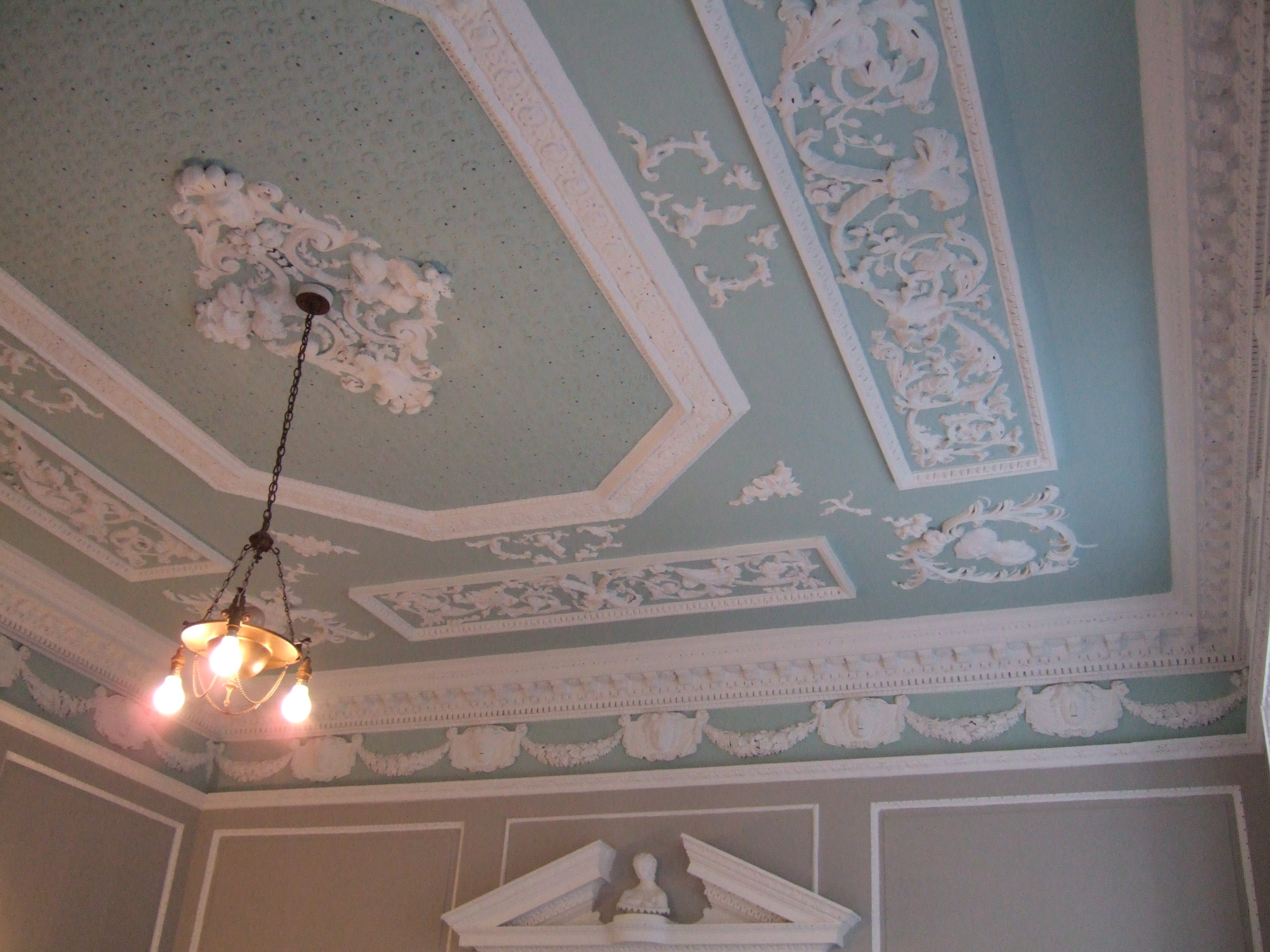
Ornate plasterwork on the ceiling of the Bastards' Study

The rebuilding of the town was officially completed in 1760–a feat commemorated by a memorial in the form of a portico to the church, known as the Fire Monument. Pevsner describes this memorial as a "detailed tabernacle with Doric columns". This was designed and paid for by John Bastard, who had it engraved, somewhat immodestly, with the inscription "in grateful Acknowledgement of the Divine Mercy, that has raised this Town, like a phoenix from its ashes, to its present beautiful and flourishing State." However, the monument also has a more practical use, built above a piped spring: should a fire break out again it would supply a head of water for the attachment of fire hoses. The monument was converted into a drinking fountain in 1899.

=== The Bastards' House ===
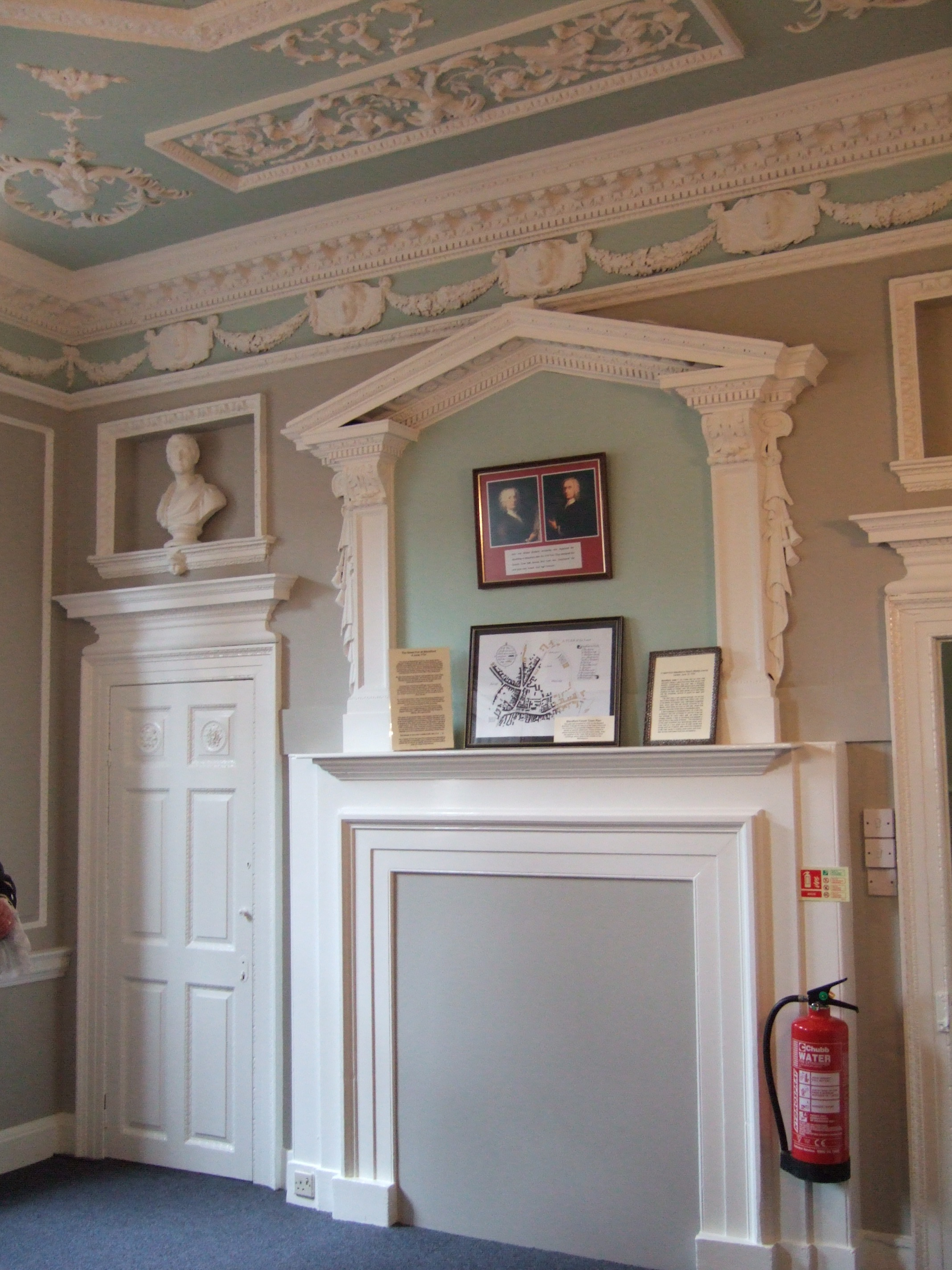
The Study in the Bastards' House.

At the time of the 1731 fire the bachelor brothers John and William occupied a house in Blandford Forum that belonged to the Trustees of the William Williams charity. The Bastards had extensive workshops and premises at the rear of this building. After the fire they rebuilt the house at their own expense in exchange for the grant of a long lease of the premises from the Williams charity. The room known as the Bastards' Study or the Mezzanine Room was ornately decorated, unlike the rest of the house, and served as a showroom for their skills in plasterwork, woodwork and interior decoration. The pediment of the overmantel is Palladian while the pediment of the door opposite is Baroque, this occurrence, coupled with the squat appearance of the composition, would not have occurred in the work of a major architect of the time, but was the Bastard's way of showcasing their versatility.

This room is open to visit as it is now the vintage room of a charity shop.

== Other works ==
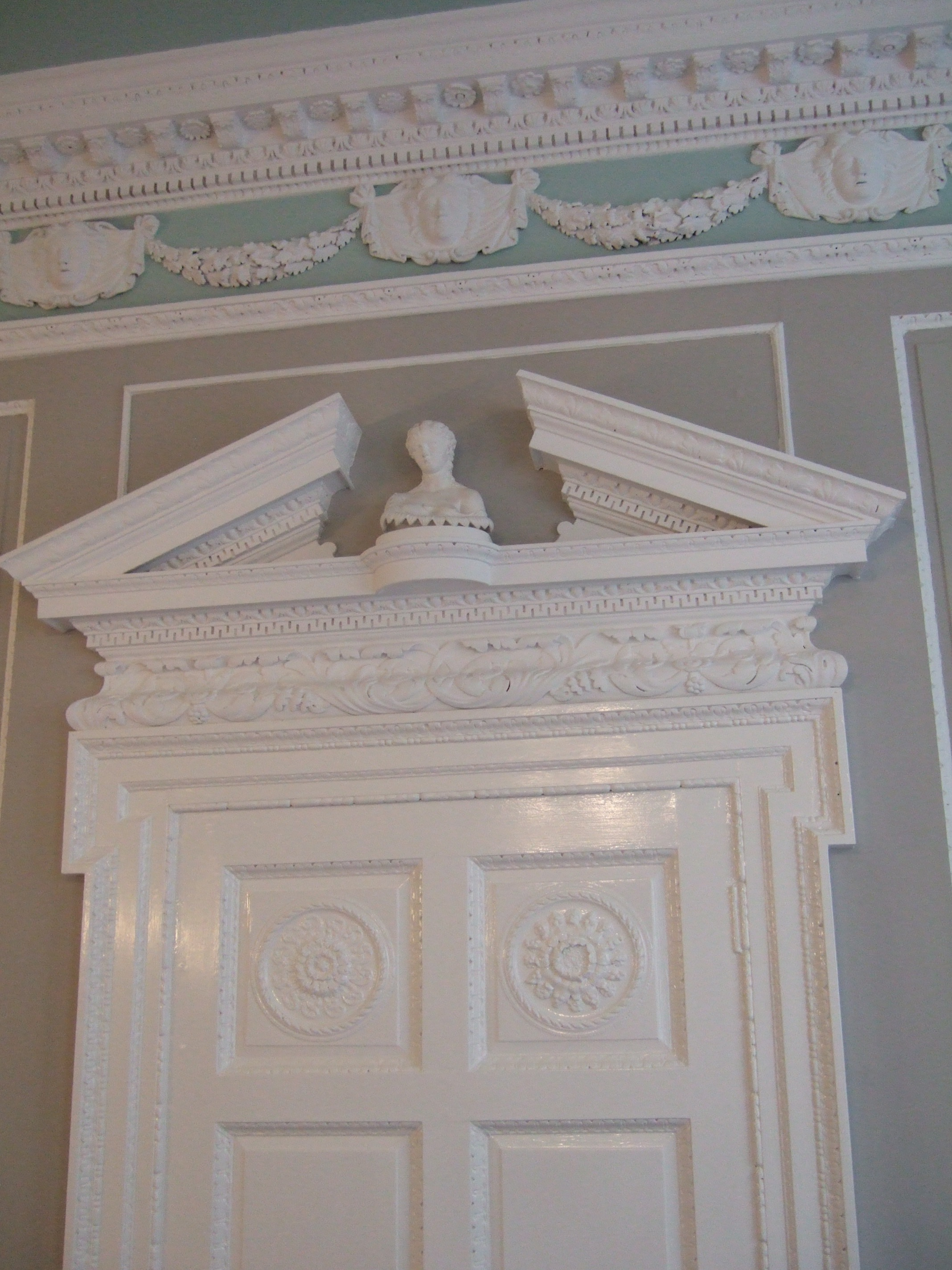
A door casement in the Study of the Bastards' House. The broken pediment is a motif of the Baroque period. The door panels contain different motifs demonstrating available styles

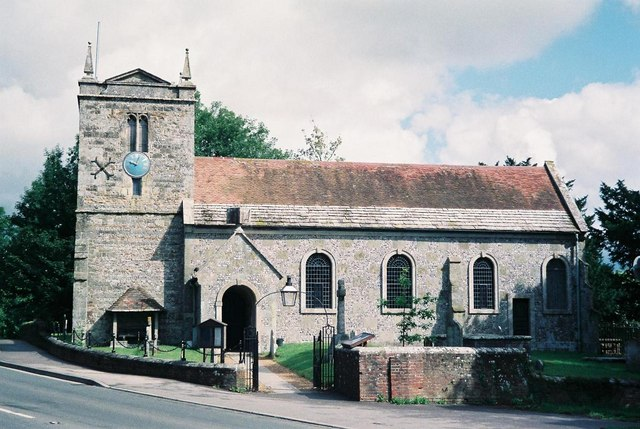
Charlton Marshall, parish church of St. Mary

The Bastard brothers' work in the no longer fashionable Baroque seems to have been through preference rather than ignorance. When working on formal civic buildings they invariably attempted to design in the more modern Palladian style, Blandford's town hall exemplifies this. However, when given the freedom of choice over design then they appear to follow the more flowing and curvaceous Baroque. John Bastard's own house, and the "Red Lion" public house both in Blandford are both in the Baroque style, with broken pediments and capitals inspired by those of Borromini rather than those of Palladio. The lack of accurate record keeping at the time has necessitated in many cases attribution to the brothers rather than complete credit.

Outside Blandford, the Bastards were responsible for joiner's and carver's work in Hazlegrove House, Somerset and at Lulworth Castle, Dorset (destroyed by fire in 1929). John Bastard was employed, with the master-mason Francis Cartwright, to rebuild Crichel House, Dorset, for Sir William Napier.

The church of St. Mary at Charlton Marshall is attributed the brothers. The church which was built in 1713 has a distinctive tower topped by four obelisk pinnacles. Charlton Marshall was the home of the Horlock-Bastard family, where they had been country gentlemen since the time of the brother' s grandfather Thomas Bastard. Thus the interior of the church contains memorials to members of the Bastard family, including a sculpture dedicated Thomas Bastard who died in 1791 which depicts a putto standing by an urn. The early 18th century nave of the Church of St Mary at Almer in Dorset is attributed to them as Stepleton House at Iwerne Stepleton, and the church of St. Giles in Wimborne St Giles was rebuilt by the brothers in 1732.

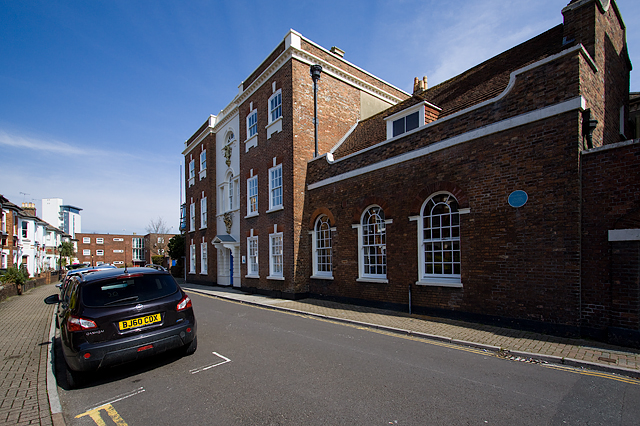
Sir Peter Thompson House in Poole, with crowded fenestration.

In Poole, a Grade I listed mansion house built in 1746 for the wealthy 18th century merchant Sir Peter Thompson, is attributed to John Bastard. This three storied brick and stuccoed house designed on an "H" plan is designed in a confused Palladian style, the fenestration making the facade crowded. It is now used as offices by private businesses.

John Bastard rebuilt Crichel House for Sir William Napier after a fire in 1742, and the brothers' nephews and heirs, Thomas, Benjamin and James, collaborated to enlarge the shell of Crichel House in 1771–73; the new interiors were designed by James Wyatt.

There is a wall monument with a pediment to Benjamin and Thomas Bastard, dated 1772, on the external face of the north wall of the parish church of St Mary Magdalene, Castleton, Sherborne in Dorset. The inscription has weathered away. Inside the nave, on the north wall of the north aisle is a monument to Elizabeth Bastard (née Prankerd), wife of Benjamin Bastard, 1732–3, and their son Benjamin. This is a marble wall monument with side-scrolls, pediment, urn and cherub's head.

Other members of the Bastard family were masons in Dorset and as far afield as London and the Dashwood mausoleum at West Wycombe. There are no records of any member of the Bastard family practising as architects after the first quarter of the 19th century

== Evaluation ==
Although the brothers' work is in a provincial style, critics have evaluated it positively. Pevsner describes the Bastards' works at Blandford as providing "One of the most satisfying Georgian ensembles anywhere in England". Such architectural naivety as can be found in some of the Bastards' works is visible in small country towns the length and breadth of Britain and exemplifies the spread of evolving architectural genres from the cities. Their work is typical of the architecture which gives character and distinction and an idiosyncratic charm to many of Britain's provincial areas.
